= 2009 UEFA European Under-17 Championship qualifying round =

Football tournament qualification stage

2009 UEFA European Under-17 Football Championship (qualifying round) is the first round of qualifications for the Final Tournament of UEFA U-17 Championship 2009. The qualifying round was played between September 15 and October 28, 2008. The 52 teams were divided into 13 groups of four teams, with each group being contested as a mini-tournament, hosted by one of the group's teams. After all matches have been played, the 13 group winners and 13 group runners-up will advance to the Elite round. If two or more teams are tied in points, a tie-break will apply according to the following criteria:

1. Higher number of points obtained in the group matches played among the teams in question;
2. Superior goal difference resulting from the group matches played among the teams in question;
3. Higher number of goals scored in the group matches played among the teams in question;
4. If, after having applied criteria 1. to 3., two teams still have an equal ranking, criteria 1. to 3. will be reapplied to determine the ranking of the two teams. If this procedure does not lead to a decision, criteria 5. and 6. will apply.
5. Results of all group matches:
  1. Superior goal difference.
  2. Higher number of goals scored.
6. Drawing of lots.

Alongside the 26 winner and runner-up teams, the two best third-placed teams also qualify. These are determined after considering only their results against their group's top two teams, and applying the following criteria in this order:

1. Higher number of points obtained in these matches;
2. Superior goal difference from these matches;
3. Higher number of goals scored in these matches;
4. Fair-play conduct of the teams in all group matches in the qualifying round;
5. Drawing of lots.

The host team of each group's mini-tournament are indicated in italics in the tables below.

== Group stage ==
=== Group 1 ===
Team	Pld	W	D	L	GF	GA	GD	Pts
Austria	3	3	0	0	14	0	14	9
Belgium	3	2	0	1	7	4	3	6
Northern Ireland	3	1	0	2	1	3	−2	3
Liechtenstein	3	0	0	3	2	17	−15	0

September 18, 2008
16:00 CET

Northern Ireland	1–0	Liechtenstein
Duffy 73' (pen.)	Report

Sportpark Eschen-Mauren, Eschen
Referee: Ignasi Villamayor Rozados (Andorra)

September 18, 2008
18:00 CET

Belgium	0–2	Austria
	Report	Knasmüllner 9'; Alaba 26'

Rheinpark Stadion, Vaduz
Referee: Libor Kovařík (Czech Republic)

September 20, 2008
16:00 CET

Northern Ireland	0–1	Austria
	Report	Knasmüllner 13'

Sportpark Eschen-Mauren, Eschen
Referee: Genadij Sidenco (Moldova)

September 18, 2008
18:00 CET

Liechtenstein	2–5	Belgium
Wieser 20', 44'	Report	Luckermans 16'; Lambreghts 32', 42', 45'; Vermijl 66'

Rheinpark Stadion, Vaduz
Referee: AIgnasi Villamayor Rozados (Andorra)

September 23, 2008
18:00 CET

Belgium	2–0	Northern Ireland
Lambreghts 41'; Maes 77'	Report

Sportpark Eschen-Mauren, Eschen
Referee: Genadij Sidenco (Moldova)

September 23, 2008
18:00 CET

Austria	11–0	Liechtenstein
Prosenik 19', 42', 49', 58'; Aschauer 37', 40', 51'; Offenbacher 64'; Kerschbaumer 67'; Grafl 68', 77'	Report

Rheinpark Stadion, Vaduz
Referee: Libor Kovařík (Czech Republic)

=== Group 2 ===
Team	Pld	W	D	L	GF	GA	GD	Pts
Denmark	3	3	0	0	10	2	8	9
Romania	3	2	0	1	7	4	3	6
Israel	3	1	0	2	5	7	−2	3
Lithuania	3	0	0	3	2	11	−9	0

September 21, 2008
16:00 CET

Romania	0–3	Denmark
	Report	Jensen 17'; Boilesen 23' (pen.); Eriksen 61'

Municipal, Rishon Le-Zion
Referee: Radek Příhoda (Czech Republic)

September 21, 2008
16:00 CET

Israel	3–1	Lithuania
Degu 55'; Adwi 66'; Shafhsa 74'	Report	Juozapaitis 62'

Ness Ziona Stadium, Ness Ziona
Referee: Lasha Silagava (Georgia (country))

September 23, 2008
16:00 CET

Romania	5–0	Lithuania
Walleth 16', 54'; Andrei 32', 79'; Benzar 77'	Report

Municipal, Rishon Le-Zion
Referee: Hüseyin Göçek (Turkey)

September 23, 2008
16:00 CET

Denmark	4–1	Israel
Gundelach 34'; Norouzi 39'; Jensen 62'; Larsen 64'	Report	Polak 80+2'

Ness Ziona Stadium, Ness Ziona
Referee: Lasha Silagava (Georgia (country))

September 26, 2008
15:00 CET

Israel	1–2	Romania
Lagrisi 78' (pen.)	Report	Andrei 18'; Benzar 39'

Ness Ziona Stadium, Ness Ziona
Referee: Radek Příhoda (Czech Republic)

September 26, 2008
15:00 CET

Lithuania	1–3	Denmark
Juozapaitis 35'	Report	Ditmer Hvilsom 67', 80+2'; Eriksen 69'

Municipal, Rishon Le-Zion
Referee: Hüseyin Göçek (Turkey)

=== Group 3 ===
Team	Pld	W	D	L	GF	GA	GD	Pts
Czech Republic	3	2	1	0	5	3	2	7
Hungary	3	1	2	0	3	2	1	5
Georgia	3	1	1	1	5	5	0	4
Bosnia and Herzegovina	3	0	0	3	1	4	−3	0

September 22, 2008
15:00 CET

Czech Republic	2–1	Bosnia and Herzegovina
Mikula 2'; Kadlec 16'	Report	Grahovac 44'

Stadion Bük, Bük
Referee: Tero Nieminen (Finland)

September 22, 2008
17:30 CET

Hungary	2–2	Georgia
Angyal 52', 66'	Report	Sheqiladze 15', 53'

Stadion Rohonci Út, Szombathely
Referee: Libor Kovařík (Czech Republic)

September 24, 2008
15:00 CET

Czech Republic	3–2	Georgia
Mikula 42'; Dvořák 64'; Vydra 80'	Report	Sheqiladze 9'; Chanturia 62'

Stadion Bük, Bük
Referee: Angel Angelov (Bulgaria)

September 24, 2008
17:30 CET

Bosnia and Herzegovina	0–1	Hungary
	Report	Ponczok 80+2'

Stadion Rohonci Út, Szombathely
Referee: Dumitru Aurelian Bogaciu (Romania)

September 27, 2008
17:30 CET

Hungary	0–0	Czech Republic
	Report

Stadion Rohonci Út, Szombathely
Referee: Tero Nieminen (Finland)

September 27, 2008
17:30 CET

Georgia	1–0	Bosnia and Herzegovina
Dzalamidze 16'	Report

Stadion Bük, Bük
Referee: Dumitru Aurelian Bogaciu (Romania)

=== Group 4 ===
Team	Pld	W	D	L	GF	GA	GD	Pts
Portugal	3	3	0	0	10	3	7	9
Wales	3	1	0	2	6	7	−1	3
Kazakhstan	3	1	0	2	3	4	−1	3
Faroe Islands	3	1	0	2	4	9	−5	3

September 15, 2008
17:00 CET

Wales	4–1	Faroe Islands
Dawkin 37'; Chamberlain 59'; Bodin 65', 69'	Report	Samson 43'

Centro Desportivo CF Fão, Fão
Referee: Richard Liesveld (Netherlands)

September 15, 2008
17:00 CET

Portugal	2–0	Kazakhstan
Carvalho 25'; Pinto 75'	Report

Estádio Municipal da Coutada, Arcos de Valdevez
Referee: Anastassios Kakos (Greece)

September 17, 2008
17:00 CET

Wales	0–2	Kazakhstan
	Report	Ayaganov 34'; Yevgeniy 75' (pen.)

Estádio Dr. José Matos Stadium, Viana do Castelo
Referee: Pavle Radovanović (Montenegro)

September 17, 2008
17:00 CET

Faroe Islands	1–4	Portugal
Petersen 72' (pen.)	Report	Carvalho 19'; Pinto 25'; Marques 49'; Luís Gustavo 66'

Estádio Cidade de Barcelos, Barcelos
Referee: Richard Liesveld (Netherlands)

September 20, 2008
17:00 CET

Portugal	4–2	Wales
Amorim 26'; Seródio 29'; Barros 61'; Beirão 69'	Report	Ribeiro 31' (o.g.); Chamberlain 80+2'

Estádio Dr. José Matos, Viana do Castelo
Referee: Anastassios Kakos (Greece)

September 20, 2008
17:00 CET

Kazakhstan	1–2	Faroe Islands
Arutyunyan 80+2'	Report	Sørensen 19'; Nolsoe 79'

Centro Desportivo CF Fão, Fão
Referee: Pavle Radovanović (Montenegro)

=== Group 5 ===
Team	Pld	W	D	L	GF	GA	GD	Pts
Greece	3	2	1	0	5	0	5	7
Luxembourg	3	1	2	0	4	2	2	5
Republic of Ireland	3	1	1	1	6	3	3	4
Andorra	3	0	0	3	2	12	−10	0

September 26, 2008
19:00 CET

Greece	4–0	Andorra
Karelis 2', 66'; Stamogiannos 79'; Pereira 80+2' (o.g.)	Report

Schieren Stadion, Schieren
Referee: Dragomir Stanković (Serbia)

September 26, 2008
19:00 CET

Republic of Ireland	1–1	Luxembourg
Rafter 19'	Report	Laterza 78'

Young Boys Diekirch Stadion, Diekirch
Referee: Hubert Siejewicz (Poland)

September 28, 2008
17:00 CET

Greece	0–0	Luxembourg
	Report

Stade rue Henri Dunant, Luxembourg City
Referee: Hubert Siejewicz (Poland)

September 28, 2008
19:00 CET

Andorra	1–5	Republic of Ireland
Llanes 42'	Report	Hendrick 37', 58', 64' (pen.); Joyce 62'; Connolly 72'

Young Boys Diekirch Stadion, Diekirch
Referee: Gediminas Mazeika (Lithuania)

October 1, 2008
19:00 CET

Republic of Ireland	0–1	Greece
	Report	Tachmazidis 4'

Stade rue Henri Dunant, Luxembourg City
Referee: Gediminas Mazeika (Lithuania)

October 1, 2008
19:00 CET

Luxembourg	3–1	Andorra
Correia 20', 35'; Deville 51'	Report	Pereira 49'

Schieren Stadion, Schieren
Referee: Hubert Siejewicz (Poland)

=== Group 6 ===
Team	Pld	W	D	L	GF	GA	GD	Pts
Croatia	3	3	0	0	6	1	5	9
Serbia	3	2	0	1	8	2	6	6
Sweden	3	1	0	2	4	4	0	3
Moldova	3	0	0	3	1	12	−11	0

October 20, 2008
15:00 CET

Croatia	1–0	Sweden
Mlinar 49'	Report

Veli Jože, Poreč
Referee: Sandor Szabo (Hungary)

October 20, 2008
15:00 CET

Serbia	5–0	Moldova
Lukić 3'; Trujić 30'; Šušnjar 34', 53'; Vučinić 63'	Report

Lako, Novigrad
Referee: Arman Amirkhanyan (Armenia)

October 22, 2008
15:00 CET

Croatia	3–0	Moldova
Livaja 7'; Jakoli 24'; Plum 44'	Report

Gradski, Umag
Referee: Arman Amirkhanyan (Armenia)

October 22, 2008
15:00 CET

Sweden	0–2	Serbia
	Report	Šušnjar 30'; Lindberg 80+2' (o.g.)

Veli Jože, Poreč
Referee: Alan Black (Northern Ireland)

October 25, 2008
15:00 CET

Serbia	1–2	Croatia
Đuričić 50'	Report	Plum 76'; Mišić 79'

Lako, Novigrad
Referee: Sandor Szabo (Hungary)

October 25, 2008
15:00 CET

Moldova	1–4	Sweden
Curos 47'	Report	Bärkroth 5'; Frick 23'; Maripuu 29'; Nilsson 75'

Gradski, Umag
Referee: Alan Black (Northern Ireland)

=== Group 7 ===
Team	Pld	W	D	L	GF	GA	GD	Pts
Norway	3	1	2	0	4	0	4	5
Switzerland	3	1	2	0	2	1	1	5
Ukraine	3	1	1	1	2	5	−3	4
Iceland	3	0	1	2	2	4	−2	1

September 24, 2008
18:00 CET

Switzerland	2–1	Iceland
Santabarbara 24'; Gonçalves 35'	Report	Kričkić 53'

Akranesvöllur, Akranes
Referee: Mihaly Fabian (Hungary)

September 24, 2008
18:00 CET

Ukraine	0–4	Norway
	Report	Bakenga 31'; Hopen 45'; Ordets 59' (o.g.); Røed 69'

Grindavíkurvöllur, Grindavík
Referee: Andrejs Sipailo (Latvia)

September 26, 2008
16:00 CET

Switzerland	0–0	Norway
	Report

Fjölnisvöllur, Reykjavík
Referee: Mihaly Fabian (Hungary)

September 26, 2008
18:00 CET

Iceland	1–2	Ukraine
Elisson 15'	Report	Guðjonsson 21' (o.g.); Noiok 64'

KR-völlur, Reykjavík
Referee: Matej Jug (Slovenia)

September 29, 2008
18:00 CET

Ukraine	0–0	Switzerland
	Report

Grindavíkurvöllur, Grindavík
Referee: Andrejs Sipailo (Latvia)

September 29, 2008
18:00 CET

Norway	0–0	Iceland
	Report

Vodafonevöllrinn, Reykjavík
Referee: Matej Jug (Slovenia)

=== Group 8 ===
Team	Pld	W	D	L	GF	GA	GD	Pts
Poland	3	3	0	0	4	0	4	9
Azerbaijan	3	1	1	1	5	5	0	4
Bulgaria	3	1	0	2	3	5	−2	3
Montenegro	3	0	1	2	3	5	−2	1

September 22, 2008
12:00 CET

Poland	1–0	Montenegro
Jonczyk 54'	Report

Public stadium, Toruń
Referee: Leontios Trattou (Cyprus)

September 22, 2008
16:00 CET

Azerbaijan	3–1	Bulgaria
Kurbanov 42', 62'; Abdullayev 59'	Report	Goranov 80'

GKS Olimpia, Grudziądz
Referee: Lars Christoffersen (Denmark)

September 24, 2008
15:00 CET

Azerbaijan	2–2	Montenegro
Guliyev 14'; Kurbanov 62'	Report	Karadžić 19'; Gardašević 25'

Urban Stadium, Szubin
Referee: Pavel Olsiak (Slovakia)

September 24, 2008
18:00 CET

Bulgaria	0–1	Poland
	Report	Efir 16'

GKS Olimpia, Grudziądz
Referee: Leontios Trattou (Cyprus)

September 27, 2008
11:30 CET

Poland	2–0	Azerbaijan
Krzak 23'; Jonczyk 75'	Report

Urban Stadium, Szubin
Referee: Lars Christoffersen (Denmark)

September 27, 2008
11:30 CET

Montenegro	1–2	Bulgaria
Karadžić 47'	Report	Blagov 2' (pen.); Kapitanov 41'

Public stadium, Toruń
Referee: Pavel Olsiak (Slovakia)

=== Group 9 ===
Team	Pld	W	D	L	GF	GA	GD	Pts
Netherlands	3	2	1	0	8	2	6	7
Italy	3	2	0	1	6	6	0	6
Latvia	3	1	0	2	3	6	−3	3
Cyprus	3	0	1	2	0	3	−3	1

October 23, 2008
11:00 CET

Italy	3–1	Latvia
Libertazzi 30'; De Vitis 69'; El Shaarawy 78'	Report	Blagijs 63'

Comunale, Aci Sant'Antonio
Attendance: 1000
Referee: Dimitar Meckarovski (North Macedonia)

October 23, 2008
14:00 CET

Netherlands	0–0	Cyprus
	Report

Comunale, Trecastagni
Attendance: 200
Referee: Vejlgaard (Denmark)

October 25, 2008
11:00 CET

Netherlands	3–0	Latvia
Janga 2'; Özyakup 6' (pen.); Isoufi 20'	Report

Comunale, Aci Santo Antonio
Attendance: 500
Referee: Vejlgaard (Denmark)

October 25, 2008
14:00 CET

Cyprus	0–1	Italy
	Report	Dell'Agnello 62'

Comunale, Trecastagni
Attendance: 500
Referee: Carlos Xistra (Portugal)

October 28, 2008
11:00 CET

Italy	2–5	Netherlands
Fossati 78'; Libertazzi 80+3'	Report	Özyakup 15' (pen.); Isoufi 58', 65'; Velder 61'; Janssen 77'

Comunale, Pedara
Attendance: 600
Referee: Carlos Xistra (Portugal)

October 28, 2008
11:00 CET

Latvia	2–0	Cyprus
Karašausks 42', 59'	Report

Centro Pol. Commerciale, Zafferana
Attendance: 100
Referee: Dimitar Meckarovski (North Macedonia)

=== Group 10 ===
Team	Pld	W	D	L	GF	GA	GD	Pts
Finland	3	3	0	0	8	2	6	9
Belarus	3	1	1	1	8	2	6	4
Macedonia	3	0	2	1	4	5	−1	2
Albania	3	0	1	2	3	14	−11	1

September 23, 2008
15:00 CET

Finland	4–0	Albania
Ahonen 31', 46'; Böling 36', 55'	Report

Hyvinkää Sportspark, Hyvinkaa
Referee: Pol van Boekel (Netherlands)

September 23, 2008
15:00 CET

Belarus	0–0	Macedonia
	Report

Riihimäki, Riihimäki
Referee: Petur Reinert (Faroe Islands)

September 25, 2008
15:00 CET

Finland	2–1	Macedonia
Laitinen 14' (pen.); Böling 74'	Report	Micevski 22'

Hyvinkää Sportspark, Hyvinkaa
Referee: Petur Reinert (Faroe Islands)

September 25, 2008
15:00 CET

Albania	0–7	Belarus
	Report	Shatalau 26'; Buloychyk 28', 36'; Makarau 43'; Kruk 46'; Yakhno 48'; Aliseiko 62'

Riihimäki, Riihimäki
Referee: Stanislav Todorov (Bulgaria)

September 28, 2008
13:00 CET

Belarus	1–2	Finland
Pukhov 11'	Report	Böling 8'; Mombilo 42'

Riihimäki, Riihimäki
Referee: Stanislav Todorov (Bulgaria)

September 28, 2008
13:00 CET

Macedonia	3–3	Albania
Ristovski 66'; Zhuta 75'; Ibragimovski 75'	Report	Kuči 10' (pen.); Hasani 15'; Shitini 26'

Hyvinkää Sportspark, Hyvinkaa
Referee: Pol van Boekel (Netherlands)

=== Group 11 ===
Team	Pld	W	D	L	GF	GA	GD	Pts
France	3	2	1	0	7	3	4	7
Scotland	3	2	0	1	8	4	4	6
Slovakia	3	1	1	1	5	4	1	4
San Marino	3	0	0	3	0	9	−9	0

September 26, 2008
16:30 CET

Scotland	3–0	San Marino
Jack 37'; Dick 39'; Keatings 45+1'	Report

Stade du Hameau, Pau
Referee: Fariz Yusifov (Azerbaijan)

September 26, 2008
19:30 CET

France	1–1	Slovakia
Abeid 3'	Report	Svarka 45'

Stade du Hameau, Pau
Referee: Ninoslav Spasić (Serbia)

September 28, 2008
16:00 CET

France	3–0	San Marino
Saadi 33', 57'; Nlundulu 56'	Report

Saint Pée, Oloron-Sainte-Marie
Referee: Fariz Yusifov (Azerbaijan)

September 28, 2008
18:00 CET

Slovakia	1–3	Scotland
Lalkovič 77'	Report	Jack 7'; Dick 11', 67'

Saint Pée, Oloron-Sainte-Marie
Referee: Dimitrios Kalopoulos (Greece)

October 1, 2008
17:00 CET

Scotland	2–3	France
Dick 36'; McRobbie 61' (pen.)	Report	Souquet 38'; Ngbakoto 79'; Coeff 80+2'

Stade du Hameau, Pau
Referee: Dimitrios Kalopoulos (Greece)

October 1, 2008
17:00 CET

San Marino	0–3	Slovakia
	Report	Horváth 31'; Lalkovič 57'; Daňo 69'

Municipal de Bordes, Bordes
Referee: Ninoslav Spasić (Serbia)

=== Group 12 ===
Team	Pld	W	D	L	GF	GA	GD	Pts
Turkey	3	2	1	0	9	6	3	7
Slovenia	3	2	0	1	5	4	1	6
Russia	3	1	1	1	5	4	1	4
Malta	3	0	0	3	0	5	−5	0

September 25, 2008
15:00 CET

Turkey	4–3	Slovenia
Çağıran 5'; Demir 40+1', 76'; Arslan 60'	Report	Medvěd 25'; Vučkić 69', 78'

Akhtyrka, Akhtyrka
Referee: David McKeon (Republic of Ireland)

September 25, 2008
15:00 CET

Russia	2–0	Malta
Ivannikov 27'; Kuzmichyov 57'	Report

Giant, Krymsk
Referee: Jan Jílek (Czech Republic)

September 27, 2008
15:00 CET

Turkey	2–0	Malta
Demir 56', 77'	Report

Giant, Krymsk
Referee: Sergey Gorokhovodatskiy (Kazakhstan)

September 27, 2008
15:00 CET

Slovenia	1–0	Russia
Vučkić 18'	Report

Centralnyi, Novorossyisk
Referee: Jan Jílek (Czech Republic)

September 30, 2008
15:00 CET

Russia	3–3	Turkey
Nurov 18'; Yemelyanov 73'; Kuzmichyov 80+3'	Report	Demir 20', 54'; Gülle 44'

Centralnyi, Novorossyisk
Referee: David McKeon (Republic of Ireland)

September 30, 2008
15:00 CET

Malta	0–1	Slovenia
	Report	Ljubijankić 65'

Akhtyrka, Akhtyrka
Referee: Sergey Gorokhovodatskiy (Kazakhstan)

=== Group 13 ===
Team	Pld	W	D	L	GF	GA	GD	Pts
Spain	3	2	1	0	9	1	8	7
England	3	1	2	0	8	1	7	5
Estonia	3	1	0	2	1	13	−12	3
Armenia	3	0	1	2	0	3	−3	1

October 22, 2008
17:00 CET

Spain	6–0	Estonia
Borja 2'; Sarabia 7'; Álex 9'; Isco 15', 29'; Amat 22'	Report

Campos Los Quartos, La Orotava
Referee: Jérôme Efong Nzolo (Belgium)

October 22, 2008
19:30 CET

England	0–0	Armenia
	Report

Campos Los Quartos, La Orotava
Referee: Marco Borg (Malta)

October 24, 2008
18:00 CET

England	7–0	Estonia
Parkes 18'; Baxter 35'; Shelvey 48'; Freeman 50'; Tamm 62' (o.g.); Knott 63'; Tunnicliffe 90+1'	Report

Campos Los Quartos, La Orotava
Referee: Victor Shvetsov (Ukraine)

October 24, 2008
20:30 CET

Armenia	0–2	Spain
	Report	Sarabia 47'; Borja 57'

Campos Los Quartos, La Orotava
Referee: Marco Borg (Malta)

October 27, 2008
20:30 CET

Spain	1–1	England
Fryers 79' (o.g.)	Report	Blázquez 11' (o.g.)

Campos Los Quartos, La Orotava
Referee: Jérôme Efong Nzolo (Belgium)

October 27, 2008
20:30 CET

Estonia	1–0	Armenia
Anier 33'	Report

Olimpico de la Longuera, Los Realejos
Referee: Victor Shvetsov (Ukraine)

=== Third-placed teams ===
Kazakhstan and Georgia advanced for the elite round as the two best third-placed teams.

Team	Grp	W	D	L	GF	GA	GD	Pts
Kazakhstan	4	1	0	1	2	2	0	3
Georgia	3	0	1	1	4	5	−1	1
Russia	12	0	1	1	3	4	−1	1
Republic of Ireland	5	0	1	1	1	2	−1	1
Macedonia	10	0	1	1	1	2	−1	1
Slovakia	11	0	1	1	2	4	−2	1
Ukraine	7	0	1	1	0	4	−4	1
Bulgaria	8	0	0	2	1	4	−3	0
Northern Ireland	1	0	0	2	0	3	−3	0
Sweden	6	0	0	2	0	3	−3	0
Israel	2	0	0	2	2	6	−4	0
Latvia	9	0	0	2	1	6	−5	0
Estonia	13	0	0	2	0	13	−13	0
