= 2009 UEFA European Under-17 Championship elite round =

Football tournament qualification stage

UEFA U-17 Championship 2009 (Elite Round) is the second round of qualifications for the final tournament of UEFA U-17 Championship 2009. The winners of each group join hosts Germany at the final tournament.

The Elite round has been played during March 1–31, 2009. The 28 teams advancing from the qualifying round have been distributed into seven groups of four teams, with each group being contested in the same format as in the previous round. The seven group-winning teams will qualify for the final tournament in Germany.

The draw was conducted on December 4, 2008, at UEFA's headquarters, in Nyon, Switzerland. Each team was previously allocated to one of four drawing pots, according to their qualifying round results. The seven sides with the best record were present in Pot A, and so forth until Pot D, which contained the seven teams with the weakest record. During the draw, each group was filled with one team from every pot, meaning that no team from the same pot could be drawn together. In the same way, teams having faced in the previous round could not be drawn together.

Pot A	Pot B	Pot C	Pot D
Austria; Denmark; Portugal; Finland; Croatia; Poland; Spain	Netherlands; Greece; France; Turkey; Czech Republic; Serbia; Scotland	Romania; Belgium; Slovenia; Italy; England; Norway; Luxembourg	Hungary; Switzerland; Belarus; Azerbaijan; Georgia; Wales; Kazakhstan

The hosts of the seven one-venue mini-tournament groups are indicated below in italics.

== Group 1 ==
Team	Pld	W	D	L	GF	GA	GD	Pts
Switzerland	3	2	1	0	8	1	7	7
Poland	3	2	0	1	4	2	2	6
Greece	3	1	1	1	4	3	1	4
Slovenia	3	0	0	3	0	10	−10	0

26 March 2009
14:00 CET

Greece	1–1	Switzerland
Karelis 40'	Report	50' Seferovic

Komotini Stadium, Komotini, Greece
Referee: Jérôme Efong Nzolo (Belgium)

26 March 2009
16:00 CET

Poland	2–0	Slovenia
Jonczyk 17', 57' (pen.)	Report

Skoda Xanthi Arena, Xanthi, Greece
Referee: Ovidiu Alin Hategan (Romania)

28 March 2009
14:00 CET

Poland	0–1	Switzerland
	Report	71' Seferovic

Komotini Stadium, Komotini, Greece
Referee: Ovidiu Alin Hategan (Romania)

28 March 2009
14:00 CET

Slovenia	0–2	Greece
	Report	15' (pen.), 19' (pen.) Potouridis

Skoda Xanthi Arena, Xanthi, Greece
Referee: Arman Amirkhanyan (Armenia)

31 March 2009
15:00 CET

Greece	1–2	Poland
Vlahos 8'	Report	35', 66' (pen.) Jonczyk

Komotini Stadium, Komotini, Greece
Referee: Jérôme Efong Nzolo (Belgium)

31 March 2009
15:00 CET

Switzerland	6–0	Slovenia
Seferovic 16'; Santabarbara 46'; Ben Khalifa 49', 54', 64'; Nimeley 73' (pen.)	Report

Skoda Xanthi Arena, Xanthi, Greece
Referee: Arman Amirkhanyan (Armenia)

== Group 2 ==
Team	Pld	W	D	L	GF	GA	GD	Pts
Spain	3	2	1	0	5	3	2	7
Belgium	3	1	2	0	9	4	5	5
Czech Republic	3	1	1	1	5	3	2	4
Kazakhstan	3	0	0	3	1	10	−9	0

12 March 2009
17:45 CET

Spain	2–2	Belgium
Sarabia 2'; Borja 45' (pen.)	Report	50' Vervaet; 80+3' Sahin

Estadio Municipal de Foietes, Benidorm
Referee: Hüseyin Göçek (Turkey)

12 March 2009
17:45 CET

Czech Republic	3–0	Kazakhstan
Kadlec 2', 15'; Polom 38'	Report

Camilo Cano, La Nucía
Referee: Leontios Trattou (Cyprus)

14 March 2009
17:45 CET

Spain	2–1	Kazakhstan
Borja 21', 68'	Report	6' Satvaldiyev

Camilo Cano, La Nucía
Referee: Matej Jug (Slovenia)

14 March 2009
17:45 CET

Belgium	2–2	Czech Republic
Krch 27' (o.g.); M'Poku 80+2'	Report	49', 56' Kadlec

Estadio Municipal de Foietes, Benidorm
Referee: Leontios Trattou (Cyprus)

17 March 2009
17:45 CET

Czech Republic	0–1	Spain
	Report	2' Sarabia

Estadio Municipal de Foietes, Benidorm
Referee: Hüseyin Göçek (Turkey)

17 March 2009
17:45 CET

Kazakhstan	0–5	Belgium
	Report	24', 64' Vervaet; 30' Lambreghts; 34' Debock; 51' M'Poku

Camilo Cano, La Nucía
Referee: Matej Jug (Slovenia)

== Group 3 ==
Team	Pld	W	D	L	GF	GA	GD	Pts
Netherlands	3	3	0	0	8	0	+8	9
Croatia	3	2	0	1	5	3	+2	6
Azerbaijan	3	0	1	2	0	4	−4	1
Luxembourg	3	0	1	2	0	6	−6	1

19 March 2009
19:00 CET

Croatia	2–0	Luxembourg
Sousa 67' (o.g.); Jakoliš 80+2'	Report

Stade Communal, Mondercange
Referee: Stephan Studer (Switzerland)

19 March 2009
19:00 CET

Netherlands	1–0	Azerbaijan
Velder 25'	Report

Stadium John Grün, Mondorf-les-Bains
Referee: Vadims Direktorenko (Latvia)

21 March 2009
16:00 CET

Croatia	3–0	Azerbaijan
Jankulica 23'; Komorski 40+1'; Plum 64'	Report

Stade Municipal, Pétange
Referee: Vladimir Vnuk (Slovakia)

21 March 2009
16:00 CET

Luxembourg	0–4	Netherlands
	Report	34', 64' Castaignos; 51' Isoufi; 79' Janga

Stadium John Grün, Mondorf-les-Bains
Referee: Vadims Direktorenko (Latvia)

24 March 2009
19:00 CET

Netherlands	3–0	Croatia
Isoufi 33'; Özyakup 76' (pen.); Castaignos 77'	Report

Stade Communal, Mondercange
Referee: Stephan Studer (Switzerland)

24 March 2009
19:00 CET

Azerbaijan	0–0	Luxembourg
	Report

Stade Municipal, Pétange
Referee: Vladimir Vnuk (Slovakia)

== Group 4 ==
Team	Pld	W	D	L	GF	GA	GD	Pts
France	3	2	1	0	5	1	4	7
Norway	3	1	1	1	2	5	−3	4
Belarus	3	1	0	2	2	5	−3	3
Denmark	3	1	0	2	5	3	2	3

24 March 2009
14:30 CET

Denmark	4–0	Norway
Ditmer Hvilsom 10', 31', 51'; Falk Jensen 64'	Report

Stade Mora, Soustons
Referee: Paweł Gil (Poland)

24 March 2009
14:30 CET

France	3–0	Belarus
Kruk 52' (o.g.); Situ 71'; Ngbakoto 77' (pen.)	Report

Stade Jean André Maye, Tarnos
Referee: Euan Norris (Scotland)

26 March 2009
17:00 CET

Denmark	1–2	Belarus
Jensen 34'	Report	13' Legchilin; 21' Buloychik

Stade Mora, Soustons
Referee: Damir Batinic (Croatia)

26 March 2009
19:00 CET

Norway	1–1	France
Bakenga 16'	Report	50' (pen.) Coeff

Stade André Darriguade, Dax
Referee: Euan Norris (Scotland)

29 March 2009
15:00 CET

France	1–0	Denmark
Souquet 40'	Report

Stade André Darriguade, Dax
Referee: Damir Batinic (Croatia)

29 March 2009
15:00 CET

Belarus	0–1	Norway
	Report	27' Wemberg

Stade Jean André Maye, Tarnos
Referee: Paweł Gil (Poland)

== Group 5 ==
Team	Pld	W	D	L	GF	GA	GD	Pts
Italy	3	3	0	0	6	2	+4	9
Austria	3	2	0	1	6	2	+4	6
Georgia	3	1	0	2	1	4	−3	3
Scotland	3	0	0	3	1	6	−5	0

20 March 2009
16:30 CET

Scotland	0–1	Georgia
	Report	80+3' (pen.) Sheqiladze

Stadion Bad Waltersdorf, Bad Waltersdorf
Referee: Clayton Pisani (Malta)

20 March 2009
19:30 CET

Austria	1–2	Italy
Alaba 22'	Report	4' Beretta; 14' Libertazzi

Stadion Stegersbach, Stegersbach
Referee: Milorad Mažić (Serbia)

22 March 2009
15:00 CET

Italy	3–1	Scotland
Sini 6', 70'; Beretta 51'	Report	49' Wright

Stadion Stegersbach, Stegersbach
Referee: Mattias Gestranius (Finland)

22 March 2009
18:00 CET

Austria	3–0	Georgia
Knasmüllner 35' (pen.); Djuricin 58'; Alaba 68'	Report

Stadion Bad Waltersdorf, Bad Waltersdorf
Referee: Clayton Pisani (Malta)

25 March 2009
19:30 CET

Scotland	0–2	Austria
	Report	9', 45' Đuričin

Stadion Stegersbach, Stegersbach
Referee: Milorad Mažić (Serbia)

25 March 2009
19:30 CET

Georgia	0–1	Italy
	Report	22' Beretta

Stadion Bad Waltersdorf, Bad Waltersdorf
Referee: Mattias Gestranius (Finland)

== Group 6 ==
Team	Pld	W	D	L	GF	GA	GD	Pts
Turkey	3	1	2	0	4	2	2	5
Wales	3	1	1	1	5	5	0	4
Romania	3	1	1	1	2	4	−2	4
Finland	3	1	0	2	4	4	0	3

26 March 2009
13:00 CET

Finland	1–2	Romania
Lehtonen 30'	Report	58' Amet; 64' Bus

Burhanettin Kocamaz, Tarsus
Referee: Nikola Dabanović (Montenegro)

26 March 2009
13:00 CET

Turkey	2–2	Wales
Sarı 35'; Töre 57'	Report	33' Bodin; 47' Chamberlain

Adana 5 Ocak Stadium, Adana
Referee: Tamás Bognar (Hungary)

28 March 2009
13:00 CET

Finland	3–0	Wales
Lehtonen 20', 25'; Alho 47'	Report

Burhanettin Kocamaz, Tarsus
Referee: Nikola Dabanović (Montenegro)

28 March 2009
13:00 CET

Romania	0–0	Turkey
	Report

Adana 5 Ocak Stadium, Adana
Referee: Gerhard Grobelnik (Austria)

31 March 2009
13:00 CET

Turkey	2–0	Finland
Sarı 6'; Töre 61'	Report

Adana 5 Ocak Stadium, Adana
Referee: Gerhard Grobelnik (Austria)

31 March 2009
13:00 CET

Wales	3–0	Romania
Lucas 26'; Walsh 37'; Dawkin 45'	Report

Burhanettin Kocamaz, Tarsus
Referee: Tamás Bognar (Hungary)

== Group 7 ==
Team	Pld	W	D	L	GF	GA	GD	Pts
England	3	3	0	0	5	1	+4	9
Serbia	3	2	0	1	5	4	+1	6
Portugal	3	1	0	2	3	4	−1	3
Hungary	3	0	0	3	0	4	−4	0

25 March 2009
14:30 CET

Portugal	0–1	England
	Report	59' Freeman

Stadion Bük, Bük
Referee: Georgios Daloukas (Greece)

25 March 2009
18:00 CET

Serbia	1–0	Hungary
Petković 40'	Report

Stadion Rohonci Út, Szombathely
Referee: Tom Harald Hagen (Norway)

27 March 2009
14:30 CET

Portugal	1–0	Hungary
Barros 49'	Report

Stadion Rohonci Út, Szombathely
Referee: Georgios Daloukas (Greece)

27 March 2009
18:00 CET

England	2–1	Serbia
Freeman 40'; Afobe 78'	Report	50' Simović

Stadion Bük, Bük
Referee: Aleksander Gauzer (Kazakhstan)

30 March 2009
17:30 CET

Serbia	3–2	Portugal
Trujić 9'; Brašanac 58'; Lukić 61'	Report	48' Viana; 55' Luís Gustavo

Stadion Bük, Bük
Referee: Aleksander Gauzer (Kazakhstan)

30 March 2009
17:30 CET

Hungary	0–2	England
	Report	57' Walcott; 60' Afobe

Stadion Rohonci Út, Szombathely
Referee: Tom Harald Hagen (Norway)
