= 2022–23 Fatih Karagümrük S.K. season =

Fatih Karagümrük S.K.
2022–23 season
- Owner: Süleyman Hurma
- President: Süleyman Hurma
- Head coach: Andrea Pirlo (until 24 May); Alparslan Erdem (from 25 may)
- Stadium: Atatürk Olympic Stadium
- Süper Lig: 7th
- Turkish Cup: Round of 16
- Top goalscorer: League: Mbaye Diagne (23 each); All: Mbaye Diagne (25 goals)
Home colours	Away colours	Third colours

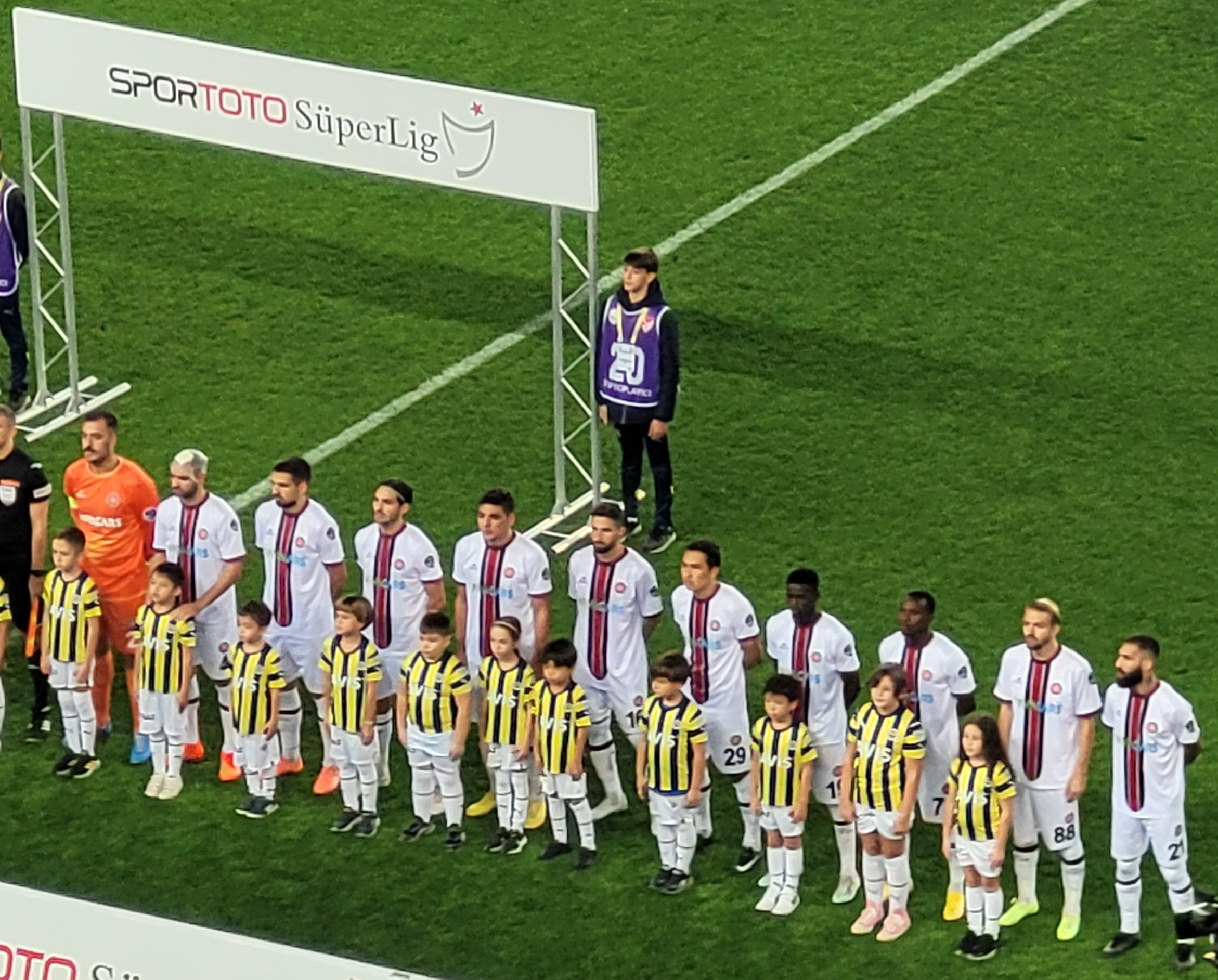
9 October 2022 Fatih Karagümrük at before Fenerbahçe away match ceremony

The 2022–23 season was the 97th season in the existence of Fatih Karagümrük S.K. and the club's third consecutive season in the top flight of Turkish football. In addition to the domestic league, Fatih Karagümrük S.K. participated in this season's edition of the Turkish Cup. The season covers the period from 1 July 2022 to 30 June 2023.

== Players ==
=== First-team squad ===
As of 2 September 2022

No.	Pos.	Nation	Player
1	GK	TUR	Batuhan Şen (on loan from Galatasaray)
2	GK	ITA	Emiliano Viviano
3	DF	TUR	Emir Tintiş
4	DF	ITA	Davide Biraschi (on loan from Genoa)
5	DF	KOS	Ibrahim Drešević
8	MF	ITA	Matteo Ricci (on loan from Frosinone)
9	FW	SEN	Mbaye Diagne
11	MF	TUR	Kerim Frei
13	MF	TUR	Colin Kazim-Richards
14	MF	TUR	Efe Tatlı
16	FW	ITA	Fabio Borini
18	MF	TUR	Levent Mercan
19	FW	GAM	Ebrima Colley (on loan from Atalanta)
21	MF	SWE	Jimmy Durmaz

No.	Pos.	Nation	Player
22	MF	TUR	Samed Onur
23	GK	TUR	Cem Kablan
24	MF	NGA	Lawrence Nicholas
25	MF	TUR	Fatih Kurnaz
27	MF	RUS	Magomed Ozdoyev
29	MF	UZB	Otabek Shukurov
37	DF	TUR	Efecan Mizrakci
45	DF	SLE	Steven Caulker
54	DF	TUR	Salih Dursun
77	MF	BEL	Adnan Ugur
86	DF	TUR	Burak Bekaroğlu
88	DF	TUR	Caner Erkin
90	FW	TUR	Berke Demircan
99	DF	ITA	Rayyan Baniya

== Pre-season and friendlies ==
Win Draw Loss Fixtures

== Competitions ==
=== Overall record ===
Competition	First match	Last match	Starting round	Final position	Record							
Competition	First match	Last match	Starting round	Final position	Pld	W	D	L	GF	GA	GD	Win %
Süper Lig	7 August 2022	6 June 2023	Matchday 1	7th	36	13	12	11	75	63	+12	36.11
Turkish Cup	10 November 2022	18 January 2023	Fourth round	Round of 16	3	2	1	0	8	3	+5	66.67
Total					39	15	13	11	83	66	+17	38.46

Source: Competitions

=== Süper Lig ===
==== League table ====
Pos	Team	Pld	W	D	L	GF	GA	GD	Pts
5	İstanbul Başakşehir	36	18	8	10	54	37	+17	62
6	Trabzonspor	36	17	6	13	64	54	+10	57
7	Fatih Karagümrük	36	13	12	11	75	63	+12	51
8	Konyaspor	36	12	15	9	49	41	+8	51
9	Kayserispor	36	15	5	16	55	61	−6	47 (Note: Reduction of 3 points by decision of the Turkish Federation.)

Source: Süper Lig
Rules for classification: 1) Points; 2) Head-to-head points; 3) Head-to-head goal difference; 4) Head-to-head goals scored; 5) Goal difference; 6) Goals scored; 7) Play-off.

==== Results summary ====
Overall								Home						Away					
Pld	W	D	L	GF	GA	GD	Pts	W	D	L	GF	GA	GD	W	D	L	GF	GA	GD
36	13	12	11	75	63	+12	51	7	5	6	40	31	+9	6	7	5	35	32	+3

Source: Spor Toto Süper Lig

==== Results by round ====
Round	1	2	3	4	5	6	7	8	9	10	11	12	13	14	15	16	17	18	19	20	21	22	23	24	25	26	27	28	29	30	31	32	33	34	35	36	37	38
Ground	H		A	H	A	H	A	H	A	H	A	H	A	H	A	H	A	H	A	A		H	A	H	A	H	A	H	A	H	A	H	A	H	A	H	A	H
Result	L	B	L	W	D	D	D	L	L	W	W	L	L	D	L	W	W	D	D	D	B	D	W	W	D	D	W	L	W	W	D	L	W	L	L	W	D	W
Position	17	17	17	13	14	14	13	14	18	13	12	13	13	15	17	13	10	10	10	10	10	11	9	8	9	9	9	9	9	8	9	9	9	9	9	8	8	7

Source: Spor Toto Süper Lig
A = Away; H = Home; B = Bye; W = Win; D = Draw; L = Loss

==== Matches ====
The league schedule was released on 4 July.

7 August 2022 1	Fatih Karagümrük	2–4	Alanyaspor	Istanbul
19:15 TRT (UTC+3)	Shukurov (yellow card) 36'; Borini (yellow card) 54' (goal) 56'; Biraschi 72'	Report	Bayır (yellow card) 15'; Eduardo 19', 70'; Bekiroğlu 28'; Candeias (yellow card) 45+3'; Bingöl (yellow card) 76'; Yardımcı 90+3'	Stadium: Atatürk Olympic Stadium; Attendance: 421; Referee: Zorbay Küçük

2	Bye

21 August 2022 3	Beşiktaş	4–1	Fatih Karagümrük	Istanbul
21:45 TRT (UTC+3)	Weghorst 17'; N'Koudou 34'; Muleka (yellow card) 40' (goal) 50'; Vardar (yellow card) 42'; Uçan (yellow card) 67'; Rosier 90'	Report	Ozdoyev (yellow card) 7'; Diagne (yellow card) 43' (goal) 53'; Erkin (yellow card) 90+2'	Stadium: Vodafone Park; Attendance: 33,444; Referee: Arda Kardeşler

27 August 2022 4	Fatih Karagümrük	4–1	Ankaragücü	Istanbul
19:15 TRT (UTC+3)	Dursun 2'; Borini 9', 48'; Diagne 83' (pen.); Musa (yellow card) 90+2'	Report	Pêpê (yellow card) 45+6'; Baniya 53' (o.g.); Ceylan (yellow card) 61'; Osmanoğlu (yellow card) 82'; Shukurov (yellow card) 90+3'	Stadium: Atatürk Olympic Stadium; Attendance: 917; Referee: Çağdaş Altay

3 September 2022 5	Sivasspor	0–0	Fatih Karagümrük	Sivas
19:15 TRT (UTC+3)	Çiftçi (yellow card) 12' (yellow card) 88' (red card)	Report	Dursun (yellow card) 44'; Borini (yellow card) 45+1'	Stadium: New Sivas 4 Eylül Stadium; Attendance: 3,089; Referee: Yasin Kol

10 September 2022 6	Fatih Karagümrük	1–1	Giresunspor	Istanbul
20:00 TRT (UTC+3)	Colley (yellow card) 25'; Dursun (yellow card) 62'; Ozdoyev (yellow card) 74'; Diagne 90+2'	Report	Campuzano (yellow card) 29'; Mejía (yellow card) 33'; Bajić (penalty missed) 75' 75'; Uludağ (yellow card) 90+6'	Stadium: Atatürk Olympic Stadium; Attendance: 850; Referee: Erkan Özdamar

18 September 2022 7	İstanbul Başakşehir	0–0	Fatih Karagümrük	Istanbul
17:00 TRT (UTC+3)	Tekdemir (red card) 90+3'	Report	Ozdoyev (yellow card) 56'; Shukurov (yellow card) 66' (yellow card) 90+5' (red card)	Stadium: Fatih Terim Stadium; Attendance: 2,350; Referee: Bahattin Şimşek

3 October 2022 8	Fatih Karagümrük	1–2	İstanbulspor	Istanbul
20:00 TRT (UTC+3)	Diagne 37' (yellow card) 89'; Viviano (yellow card) 84'	Report	Gültekin (yellow card) 45+3'; Rroca 69' (yellow card) 89'; Topalli 74'	Stadium: Atatürk Olympic Stadium; Attendance: 353; Referee: Ali Şansalan

9 October 2022 9	Fenerbahçe	5–4	Fatih Karagümrük	Istanbul
20:00 TRT (UTC+3)	Crespo 9', (yellow card) 55'; Valencia 28', 62' (pen.), 73' (pen.); Batshuayi 90+5'	Report	Borini 16', 66' (pen.), (yellow card) 79'; Kouassi 24'; Dursun (yellow card) 27'; Shukurov (yellow card) 58'; Nicholas (yellow card) 71'; Kapacak 83'	Stadium: Şükrü Saracoğlu Stadium; Attendance: 39,537; Referee: Atilla Karaoğlan

15 October 2022 10	Fatih Karagümrük	3–0	Hatayspor	Istanbul
14:30 TRT (UTC+3)	Durmaz (yellow card) 11'; Caulker 36'; Nicholas (yellow card) 38'; Borini 45+3'; Biraschi (yellow card) 81'; Diagne 90+8' (pen.)	Report	Öksüz (yellow card) 21'; Ergün (yellow card) 81'	Stadium: Necmi Kadıoğlu Stadium; Attendance: 1,042; Referee: Volkan Bayarslan

22 October 2022 11	Ümraniyespor	1–3	Fatih Karagümrük	Istanbul
14:30 TRT (UTC+3)	Nayir 3'	Report	Biraschi 8'; Ozdoyev (yellow card) 12'; Nicholas (yellow card) 27'; Diagne 55'; Erkin (yellow card) 76'; Borini 90'	Stadium: Ümraniye Municipality City Stadium; Attendance: 1,532; Referee: Mert Güzenge

28 October 2022 12	Fatih Karagümrük	0–2	Galatasaray	Istanbul
20:00 TRT (UTC+3)	Ugur (red card) 33'; Borini (yellow card) 42'; Durmaz (yellow card) 77'	Report	Taşdemir 60'; Bayram (yellow card) 78'; Mata 85'	Stadium: Atatürk Olympic Stadium; Attendance: 8,579; Referee: Bahattin Şimşek

6 November 2022 13	Antalyaspor	4–2	Fatih Karagümrük	Antalya
17:00 TRT (UTC+3)	Wright 35'; Vural 41', 84'; Sarı 45+2'; Aydoğdu (yellow card) 90+5'	Report	Colley 4'; Diagne 19'; Viviano (yellow card) 30'; Shukurov (yellow card) 50'; Ozdoyev (yellow card) 55'	Stadium: Antalya Stadium; Attendance: 8,798; Referee: Abdulkadir Bitigen

13 November 2022 14	Fatih Karagümrük	3–3	Gaziantep	Istanbul
14:30 TRT (UTC+3)	Baniya 32', 52'; Dursun (yellow card) 63'; Kouassi 69'	Report	Ersoy 13' (yellow card) 46'; Figueiredo 20'; Jevtović (yellow card) 25'; Merkel (yellow card) 62' (goal) 65'	Stadium: Atatürk Olympic Stadium; Attendance: 144; Referee: Mustafa Kürşad Filiz

25 December 2022 15	Adana Demirspor	2–1	Fatih Karagümrük	Adana
13:30 TRT (UTC+3)	Akbaba 11', 43'; Stambouli (yellow card) 37'; Gulbrandsen (yellow card) 71'; Sarı (yellow card) 90+3'	Report	Borini 19'; Colley (yellow card) 37'; Kouassi (yellow card) 90+6'	Stadium: New Adana Stadium; Attendance: 9,648; Referee: Erkan Özdamar

28 December 2022 16	Fatih Karagümrük	4–1	Trabzonspor	Istanbul
20:00 TRT (UTC+3)	Ozdoyev 6', (yellow card) 62'; Borini 34'; Colley (yellow card) 43' (yellow-red card) 56'; Ricci 67'; Diagne (yellow card) 77'; Kouassi 87'	Report	Bartra 20', (red card) 45+3'; Yazıcı (yellow card) 90+7'	Stadium: Atatürk Olympic Stadium; Attendance: 4,071; Referee: Ümit Öztürk

4 January 2023 17	Kayserispor	2–4	Fatih Karagümrük	Kayseri
17:00 TRT (UTC+3)	Mensah 57' (pen.) (yellow card) 90+4'; Parlak 72'	Report	Mercan 1'; Diagne 12', 63'; Shukurov 47' (yellow card) 52'; Şen (yellow card) 90+6'; Kazim-Richards (yellow card) 90+6'	Stadium: Kadir Has Stadium; Attendance: 2,682; Referee: Suat Arslanboğa

8 January 2023 18	Fatih Karagümrük	3–3	Konyaspor	Istanbul
13:30 TRT (UTC+3)	Ozdoyev 7'; Shukurov (yellow card) 8'; Borini (yellow card) 27'; Diagne 33' (yellow card) 49'; Baniya (yellow card) 46'; Frei 88'; Biraschi (yellow card) 90+4'	Report	Ülgün (yellow card) 45+3'; Diouf 65', 72', 90+5'	Stadium: Atatürk Olympic Stadium; Attendance: 772; Referee: Kadir Sağlam

15 January 2023 19	Kasımpaşa	2–2	Fatih Karagümrük	Istanbul
16:00 TRT (UTC+3)	Hadergjonaj 30' (pen.); Tırpan (yellow card) 60'; Graovac (yellow card) 65'; Bahoken (yellow card) 90' (goal) 90+10'	Report	Drešević 51'; Borini 62'; Colley (yellow card) 77'; Uğur (yellow card) 90+4'	Stadium: Recep Tayyip Erdoğan Stadium; Attendance: 2,887; Referee: Çağdaş Altay

22 January 2023 20	Alanyaspor	2–2	Fatih Karagümrük	Antalya
16:00 TRT (UTC+3)	Güneş 6'; Cavaleiro 83'; Balkovec (yellow card) 90+5'	Report	Borini 59', 79'; Kapacak (yellow card) 90+3'	Stadium: Kırbıyık Holding Stadium; Attendance: 2,827; Referee: Burak Pakkan

21	Bye

31 January 2023 22	Fatih Karagümrük	1–1	Beşiktaş	Istanbul
20:00 TRT (UTC+3)	Ozdoyev 49'; Biraschi (yellow card) 63'	Report	Tosun 33'; Fernandes (yellow card) 90+7'	Stadium: Atatürk Olympic Stadium; Referee: Ali Şansalan

4 February 2023 23	Ankaragücü	0–2	Fatih Karagümrük	Ankara
13:30 TRT (UTC+3)	Pedrinho (penalty missed) 31'	Report	Diagne 45+1'; Borini 64' (pen.); Bertolacci (yellow card) 74'	Stadium: Eryaman Stadium; Referee: Arda Kardeşler

4 March 2023 24	Fatih Karagümrük	4–3	Sivasspor	Istanbul
13:30 TRT (UTC+3)	Borini (yellow card) 34'; Diagne 45+4', 53', 80'; Ozdoyev 69'; Bertolacci (yellow card) 73'; Ricci (yellow card) 88'	Report	Caicedo 27'; Goutas (yellow card) 40'; James 90+1', 90+6'	Stadium: Atatürk Olympic Stadium; Referee: Ümit Öztürk

10 March 2023 25	Giresunspor	2–2	Fatih Karagümrük	Giresun
20:00 TRT (UTC+3)	Bajić 20' (pen.); Sainz 39'; Bilazer (yellow card) 45+2'; Genç (yellow card) 65'	Report	Mercan 45'; Baniya (yellow card) 53'; Borini 57'; Ricci (yellow card) 79'	Stadium: Çotanak Sports Complex; Referee: Kadir Sağlam

19 March 2023 26	Fatih Karagümrük	2–2	İstanbul Başakşehir	Istanbul
16:00 TRT (UTC+3)	Baniya (yellow card) 9'; Borini 45+4'; Shukurov (yellow card) 74'; Diagne 90+2'	Report	Duarte (yellow card) 8'; Aleksić 42'; Gürler 90+1'	Stadium: Atatürk Olympic Stadium; Referee: Tugay Kaan Numanoğlu

3 April 2023 27	İstanbulspor	0–1	Fatih Karagümrük	Istanbul
20:30 TRT (UTC+3)	Gültekin (yellow card) 30'; Losha (yellow card) 50'; Lokilo (yellow card) 58'; Eze (yellow card) 75'; Yaşar (yellow card) 80'	Report	Diagne 27'; Ricci (yellow card) 44'; Biraschi (yellow card) 90+1' (yellow-red card) 90+4'	Stadium: Necmi Kadıoğlu Stadium; Referee: Atilla Karaoğlan

10 April 2023 28	Fatih Karagümrük	1–2	Fenerbahçe	Istanbul
20:30 TRT (UTC+3)	Ozdoyev 24'; Ricci (yellow card) 50'	Report	Kadıoğlu (yellow card) 42'; Zajc 51'; Szalai 78'	Stadium: Atatürk Olympic Stadium; Referee: Abdulkadir Bitigen

29	Hatayspor	0–3 (w/o)	Fatih Karagümrük	Hatay
		Report		Stadium: New Hatay Stadium
Note: Hatayspor withdrew from the league due to the 2023 Turkey–Syria earthquake and Fatih Karagümrük, therefore, were awarded a 3–0 win.

18 April 2023 30	Fatih Karagümrük	4–2	Ümraniyespor	Istanbul
20:30 TRT (UTC+3)	Shukurov (yellow card) 34'; Diagne (yellow card) 40', (goal) 75'; Lobzhanidze 45+1'; Borini 45+6' (pen.), 52' (pen.); Drešević (yellow card) 83'; Kapacak (yellow card) 90+5'; Viviano (yellow card) 90+9'	Report	Nayir 36' (pen.); Glumac (yellow card) 45+5'; Kayode (yellow card) 45+8', (goal) 62'	Stadium: Atatürk Olympic Stadium; Referee: Ali Şansalan

23 April 2023 31	Galatasaray	3–3	Fatih Karagümrük	Istanbul
19:00 TRT (UTC+3)	Aktürkoğlu 3'; Oliveira 45' (pen.); Icardi (penalty missed) 67'; Boey 80'	Report	Diagne 18'; Borini 26', 30'; Nicholas (yellow card) 48'; Mercan (yellow card) 85'; Drešević (yellow card) 90+6'	Stadium: Nef Stadium; Referee: Volkan Bayarslan

29 April 2023 32	Fatih Karagümrük	0–1	Antalyaspor	Istanbul
16:00 TRT (UTC+3)	Bertolacci (yellow card) 59'	Report	Sinik 21'	Stadium: Atatürk Olympic Stadium; Referee: Halil Umut Meler

33	Gaziantep	0–3 (w/o)	Fatih Karagümrük	Gaziantep
		Report		Stadium: Gaziantep Stadium
Note: Gaziantep withdrew from the league due to the 2023 Turkey–Syria earthquake and Fatih Karagümrük, therefore, will be awarded a 3–0 win.

17 May 2023 34	Fatih Karagümrük	2–3	Adana Demirspor	Istanbul
20:00 TRT (UTC+3)	Shukurov (yellow card) 21'; Baniya (yellow card) 34'; Özbir 44' (o.g.); Drešević (yellow card) 65'; Diagne 80'; Ozdoyev (yellow card) 90+5'	Report	Inler (yellow card) 1'; C. Ndiaye 51'; Sari (yellow card) 61'; Onyekuru 76'; Drešević 84' (o.g.)	Stadium: Atatürk Olympic Stadium; Referee: Kadir Sağlam

22 May 2023 35	Trabzonspor	4–1	Fatih Karagümrük	Trabzon
20:00 TRT (UTC+3)	Bartra 8'; Şen 20' (o.g.); Trézéguet 35', 51'; Asan (yellow card) 87'	Report	Diagne 14'	Stadium: Şenol Güneş Sports Complex; Referee: Turgot Doman

30 May 2023 36	Fatih Karagümrük	2–0	Kayserispor	Istanbul
20:00 TRT (UTC+3)	Frei 16', 28'; Bertolacci (yellow card) 57'; Drešević (yellow card) 77'	Report	Ackah (red card) 8'; Cardoso (yellow card) 82'; Mensah (yellow card) 87'	Stadium: Atatürk Olympic Stadium; Referee: Murat Erdoğan

3 June 2023 37	Konyaspor	1–1	Fatih Karagümrük	Konya
16:00 TRT (UTC+3)	Moreno 40'; Pozuelo (yellow card) 42'; Calvo (yellow card) 43'; Ülgün (yellow card) 78'	Report	Diagne 45+4'; Rodrigues (yellow card) 45'	Stadium: Konya Metropolitan Municipality Stadium; Referee: Yasin Kol

6 June 2023 38	Fatih Karagümrük	3–0	Kasımpaşa	Istanbul
17:00 TRT (UTC+3)	Lobzhanidze 13'; Bertolacci (yellow card) 34'; Diagne 67', 82', (yellow card) 82'; Feghouli (yellow card) 72'	Report	Özcan (yellow card) 47'	Stadium: Atatürk Olympic Stadium; Referee: Burak Şeker

=== Turkish Cup ===
10 November 2022 Fourth round	Fatih Karagümrük	3–1	Kırşehir Futbol Spor Kulübü	Istanbul
19:00 TRT (UTC+3)	Diagne 32'; Dursun 73'; Borini 88' (pen.)	Report	Yorulmaz 57' (pen.)	Stadium: Esenler Stadium

21 December 2022 Fifth round	Fatih Karagümrük	3–0	Uşak Spor	Istanbul
15:00 TRT (UTC+3)	Kouassi 14'; Colley 71'; Richards 84'	Report		Stadium: Esenler Stadium

18 January 2023 Round of 16	Fatih Karagümrük	2–2 (a.e.t.) (3–5 p)	Başakşehir	Istanbul
14:30 TRT (UTC+3)	Diagne 68'; Frei 115'	Report	Mercan 71' (o.g.); Türüç 120+1' (pen.)	Stadium: Necmi Kadıoğlu Stadium
	Penalties
	Richards (penalty scored); Dresevic (penalty scored); Biraschi (penalty missed); Shukurov (penalty scored)		(penalty scored) Türüç; (penalty scored) Lima; (penalty scored) Özcan; (penalty scored) Ndayishimiye; (penalty scored) Caiçara
