= Aleksandar Simović =

Aleksandar Simović may refer to:

- Aleksandar Simović (conspirator), co-conspirator in the assassination of Zoran Đinđić
- Aleksandar Simović (footballer), Serbian footballer
