= Jonczyk =

Jonczyk or Jończyk is a Polish surname. Notable people with this surname include:

- Michał Jonczyk (born 1992), Polish footballer
- Renata Janik née Jończyk (born 1965), Polish politician
