= Đorđe Šušnjar =

Serbian footballer

Personal information
- Full name: Đorđe Šušnjar
- Date of birth: 18 February 1992 (age 34)
- Place of birth: Ruma, SFR Yugoslavia
- Height: 1.85 m (6 ft 1 in)
- Position: Striker

Team information
- Current team: Loznica
- Number: 14

Youth career
- 2003–2005: Ajax Novi Sad
- 2005–2009: Vojvodina

Senior career*
Years	Team	Apps	(Gls)
2009–2013	Vojvodina	9	(0)
2010–2012	→ Donji Srem (loan)	40	(15)
2012–2013	→ Sutjeska Nikšić (loan)	32	(19)
2013–2015	Jagodina	53	(13)
2015–2017	Lugano	8	(1)
2016	→ Chiasso (loan)	10	(1)
2017	Riga	6	(1)
2018	Torpedo Minsk	8	(0)
2018–2020	Mačva Šabac	54	(2)
2021	Samambaia		
2022	Sloboda Užice	19	(9)
2023	Železničar Pančevo	28	(5)
2024–2025	Mladost Novi Sad	53	(11)
2025–	Loznica	19	(1)

International career
2008	Serbia U17	3	(3)
- * Club domestic league appearances and goals as of 14 May 2026

Đorđe Šušnjar (Serbian Cyrillic: Ђорђе Шушњар; born 18 February 1992) is a Serbian footballer who plays as a forward for Loznica.

== Club career ==
Born in Ruma, he started his youth career in a local club called FK Ajaks from Novi Sad where he played between 2003 and 2005. In 2005, he joined the youth team of FK Vojvodina. Šušnjar made his debut for FK Vojvodina against FK Javor, on 5 December 2009, at the age of 17. He was loaned to FK Donji Srem for the 2010–11 season. After the Pećinci based club earned promotion to the Serbian First League, Šušnjar extended his loan for the 2011–12 season. Halfway through the season, he returned from Donji Srem, and was then loaned to Montenegrin club Sutjeska Nikšić, where he spent the rest of 2011–12 season, establishing himself as one of the key players in team's successful attempt to avoid relegation.

== International career ==
In 2008, Šušnjar has represented Serbian under-17 team during the qualifying round for the 2009 UEFA U-17 Championship. He played three matches, scoring a brace against Moldova and one goal against Sweden.

In August 2012 he accepted a call from the Montenegrin U-21 team to play in the 2012 Valeriy Lobanovsky international tournament, but did not made any appearance in the tournament.
