= HNK Mitnica Vukovar =

Croatian football club

HNK Mitnica
- Full name: Hrvatski nogometni klub Mitnica
- Founded: 2008
- Ground: Stadium HNK Mitnica
- President: Antun Karaula
- League: 2. ŽNL Vukovarsko-srijemska
- Website: http://www.hnk-mitnica.hr
Home colours	Away colours

HNK Mitnica is a football club from Vukovar.

== History ==
HNK Mitnica is founded March 2008, it was founded by Croatian disabled homeland war veterans and Croatian war veterans from area of Vukovar's city district Mitnica.

Club is involved in 2. ŽNL Vukovarsko-srijemska since season 2014/15.
