= Giacomo Beretta =

Italian professional footballer

Personal information
- Date of birth: 14 March 1992 (age 34)
- Place of birth: Varese, Italy
- Height: 1.85 m (6 ft 1 in)
- Position: Centre forward

Team information
- Current team: Gubbio
- Number: 81

Youth career
- AlbinoLeffe
- 2009–2010: AC Milan

Senior career*
Years	Team	Apps	(Gls)
2010–2017	AC Milan	1	(0)
2011–2012	→ Ascoli (loan)	14	(1)
2012	→ Juve Stabia (loan)	8	(0)
2012–2013	→ Pavia (loan)	29	(10)
2013–2014	→ Lecce (loan)	25	(4)
2014–2016	→ Pro Vercelli (loan)	58	(8)
2016–2017	→ Entella (loan)	8	(0)
2017	→ Carpi (loan)	15	(1)
2017–2018	Foggia	28	(7)
2018–2020	Ascoli	29	(3)
2020–2021	Padova	0	(0)
2021–2023	Cittadella	58	(10)
2023–2024	Foggia	15	(2)
2024	→ Lecco (loan)	2	(0)
2024–2025	Pro Patria	28	(8)
2025–2026	Cosenza	25	(4)
2026–	Gubbio	0	(0)

International career
2009–2010	Italy U17	15	(10)
2010–2011	Italy U19	7	(1)
2011–2014	Italy U20	16	(7)
- * Club domestic league appearances and goals as of 1 May 2026

Giacomo Beretta (born 14 March 1992) is an Italian professional footballer who plays as a forward for Serie C Group B club Gubbio.

== Club career ==
=== Early years ===
Beretta joined AC Milan in the summer of 2009, in a co-ownership deal with his former club AlbinoLeffe for €900,000. He spent the season playing for Milan's under-20 side, who won the Coppa Italia Primavera 25 years after the team's last success in the competition, although he missed several games throughout the year due to injury.

=== AC Milan (2010–11) ===
At the beginning of the 2010–11 season, Beretta's playing rights were fully purchased by AC Milan for a fee of €1M. However, half of them were subsequently sold for €4M to Genoa in a new co-ownership deal on 23 August, with Milan keeping the actual use of the player for the season thanks to a loan deal. The then 18-year-old forward kept playing for the under-20 team, but also made his official first team debut on 1 May 2011, in a Serie A game against Bologna.

=== Ascoli and Juve Stabia (2011–12) ===
For the 2011–12 season, Beretta's co-ownership between Milan and Genoa was renewed, but he was loaned out to Serie B side Ascoli. Beretta made up a total of 15 appearances (13 in the league and two in 2011–12 Coppa Italia) and one goal, before moving to Juve Stabia during the January transfer window.

=== Pavia (2012–13) ===
For the 2012–13 season Beretta was loaned out to Prima Divisione club Pavia.

=== Lecce (2013–14) ===
At the start of the 2013–14 campaign, Milan bought back Beretta for €2 million. However, he was loaned out to Lega Pro Prima Divisione club Lecce.

=== Pro Vercelli (2014–2016) ===
For the 2014–15 season he was loaned out again, this time to Pro Vercelli. The deal was renewed for one more season in July 2015.

=== Virtus Entella (2016–17) ===
On 24 August 2016 Beretta joined Virtus Entella in another loan.

=== Foggia ===
On 26 July 2017, Serie B Foggia signed Beretta from Milan in a definitive deal on a two-year player contract.

=== Return to Ascoli ===
On 21 July 2018, he returned to Ascoli, signing a 3-year contract. On 2 October 2020, his contract was terminated by mutual consent.

=== Padova ===
On 22 October 2020 he signed with Serie C side Padova.

=== Cittadella ===
On 1 February 2021 he moved to Serie B club Cittadella.

=== Return to Foggia ===
On 13 January 2023, Beretta signed a 2.5-year contract with Foggia. On 18 January 2024, he was loaned to Serie B club Lecco, with an option to buy. On 22 July 2024, his contract with Foggia was terminated by mutual consent.

== International career ==
Beretta won 15 caps and scored 10 goals for Italy U-17 in 2009. He scored 3 goals in all 3 matches of 2009 UEFA European Under-17 Football Championship elite qualification. In the final tournament, he scored once in 4 appearances. He was also part of the squad that took part in the 2009 FIFA U-17 World Cup, making 4 appearances and scoring a goal in the tournament (against the United States).

Beretta went on to be capped for Italy U-19, winning 7 caps and scoring one goal between 2010 and 2011, as well as featuring in 15 games for the U-20 side from 2010 to 2014.

== Honours ==
=== Milan ===
Serie A: 1

2010–11
