= Pedrinho (footballer, born 1992) =

Portuguese footballer

Personal information
- Full name: Pedro Filipe Barbosa Moreira
- Date of birth: 20 December 1992 (age 33)
- Place of birth: Cristelo, Portugal
- Height: 1.70 m (5 ft 7 in)
- Position: Midfielder

Team information
- Current team: Antalyaspor
- Number: 14

Youth career
- 2000–2003: FC Cristelo
- 2003–2011: Freamunde

Senior career*
Years	Team	Apps	(Gls)
2011–2016	Freamunde	120	(18)
2013	→ Vila Meã (loan)	16	(5)
2016–2020	Paços Ferreira	125	(11)
2020	Riga	10	(2)
2021–2022	Gil Vicente	52	(2)
2022–2024	Ankaragücü	60	(3)
2024–2025	Kocaelispor	35	(2)
2025–2026	Çorum	40	(1)
2026–	Antalyaspor	1	(0)
- * Club domestic league appearances and goals as of 23:06, 26 August 2026 (UTC)

Pedro Filipe Barbosa Moreira (born 20 December 1992), known as Pedrinho, is a Portuguese professional footballer who plays as a midfielder for TFF 1. Lig club Antalyaspor.

He recorded figures of 117 games and 17 goals in the second tier with Freamunde and Paços de Ferreira, winning the third division title with the former in 2014 and the second with the latter in 2019. He made 148 Primeira Liga appearances for Paços and Gil Vicente, and won the Latvian Higher League during his brief spell at Riga in 2020.

== Club career ==
=== Freamunde ===
Born in Cristelo (Paredes), Pedrinho moved from his hometown club FC Cristelo to S.C. Freamunde at the age of 11. He made his professional debut in the Segunda Liga on 22 January 2012, as a substitute for Bock in the last three minutes of a 3–0 home win against U.D. Oliveirense. He began playing regularly in the 2013–14 season as the side won the third division, and scored the decisive goal in the 3–2 victory over Clube Oriental de Lisboa in the final on 10 June.

Pedrinho scored his first goal in a professional league on 9 August 2014, as the campaign opened with a 1–0 win at home to Atlético Clube de Portugal. In 2015–16, he was the league's joint sixth highest scorer with a career-best 13 as his team came fifth; this included two goals on 23 January in a 3–0 defeat of visitors Vitória S.C. B.

=== Paços Ferreira ===
In July 2016, Pedrinho signed a four-year contract at nearby F.C. Paços de Ferreira in the Primeira Liga. In his third top-flight game, he scored twice in a 5–3 loss at Vitória de Guimarães. In 2018–19, he captained the team led by promotion specialist Vítor Oliveira to the second division title; he scored once on 13 January to conclude a 3–0 win at C.D. Cova da Piedade.

=== Riga ===
At the end of July 2020, out-of-contract Pedrinho headed abroad for the first time, to Riga FC in Latvia. On 18 September, in his career's first European match, he scored the only goal of a home win over San Marino's S.P. Tre Fiori in the second qualifying round of the UEFA Europa League. He ended the year as a Higher League winner.

=== Gil Vicente ===
On 23 January 2021, Pedrinho returned to his country's top flight on an 18-month deal at Gil Vicente FC. He scored once as the team climbed from 15th to 11th, an added-time penalty to decide a home victory against C.D. Santa Clara on 20 February.

Pedrinho contributed 33 matches and one goal in his only full season (37 overall, 13 assists), helping to qualification for the UEFA Europa Conference League as fifth.

=== Later career ===
On 15 June 2022, in spite having renewed his contract until 2025 shortly before, Pedrinho agreed to a two-year at deal at newly-promoted Turkish Süper Lig club MKE Ankaragücü.

Remaining in the country, Pedrinho then represented TFF 1. Lig sides Kocaelispor, Çorum F.K. and Antalyaspor, winning the league and promoting with the first.

== Honours ==
Freamunde

- Campeonato Nacional de Seniores: 2013–14

Paços de Ferreira

- LigaPro: 2018–19

Riga

- Latvian Higher League: 2020

Kocaelispor

- TFF 1. Lig: 2024–25
