= Daniel Norouzi =

Danish footballer (born 1992)

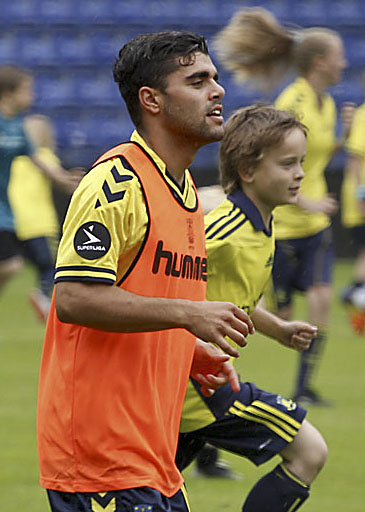

Personal information
- Date of birth: 3 January 1992 (age 34)
- Place of birth: Copenhagen, Denmark
- Height: 1.70 m (5 ft 7 in)
- Positions: Defensive midfielder; left-back

Youth career
- Brøndby

Senior career*
Years	Team	Apps	(Gls)
2011–2015	Brøndby	38	(0)
2013–2015	→ Vejle Boldklub (loan)	49	(0)
2015–2016	Vejle Boldklub	22	(0)
2016	Sepahan	0	(0)
2016–2019	Næstved	76	(3)
2019–2024	Helsingør	119	(3)

International career
2007–2008	Denmark U16	4	(0)
2008–2009	Denmark U17	16	(1)
2009–2010	Denmark U18	5	(0)
2011	Denmark U19	2	(0)
2012	Denmark U20	4	(0)
- * Club domestic league appearances and goals

Daniel Norouzi (born 3 January 1992) is a Danish retired professional footballer who played as a defensive midfielder.

== Early and personal life ==
Norouzi was born in Copenhagen. He also holds Iranian nationality.

== Club career ==
He came through the youth ranks of Brøndby, and was team captain during his youth team years.

He was promoted to the Brøndby senior team in Autumn 2011, but shoulder and knee injuries prevented his debut. Norouzi found himself third in the left back pecking-order, behind Danish international Thomas Rasmussen and Jan Frederiksen. In the Winter break of the 2011-12 Danish Superliga season, Rasmussen left the club, while Frederiksen sustained an injury, and Norouzi was poised to claim the left back position as his own. Norouzi made his senior debut in March 2012, and played 12 of 15 games in the second half of the 2011–12 Superliga season.

He signed a season-long loan contract with Vejle Boldklub in July 2013.

He signed a one-year contract with Iranian club Sepahan on 16 June 2016. However, due to Iranian military rules, he could not get the permission to play in the Persian Gulf Pro League. On 7 August 2016, he ended his contract with Sepahan.

He then played for Næstved and Helsingør.

On 18 September 2024, he announced his retirement.

== International career ==
Norouzi made his youth international debut for the Denmark national under-16 football team in September 2007. He played his first competitive international game in the 2009 UEFA European Under-17 Football Championship qualifying round in September 2008.

He has played a total of 31 games for various Danish national youth teams, including two games for the Denmark national under-20 football team.

Norouzi was born to Iranian parents and is eligible to play for the Iran national football team.

== Playing style ==
Norouzi was described by first club Brøndby as an aggressive left back.
