= Närpes Kraft Fotbollsförening =

Finnish football club

- Full name: Närpes Kraft Fotbollsförening
- Nickname: Kraft
- Founded: 1996; 30 years ago
- Ground: Mosedal, Närpes, Finland
- Capacity: 2,000
- Chairman: Mårten Grandell
- Coach: Peter Sundlin
- League: Kakkonen
- 2026: Kakkonen Group C, 5th of 10
Home colours	Away colours

Närpes Kraft Fotbollsförening (abbreviated Kraft) is a football club from Närpes (Finnish: Närpiö), Finland. The original club was formed in 1930 and their home ground is at the Mosedal. The men's football first team currently plays in the Kakkonen (Second Division).

== Background ==
IF Kraft or Kraft Närpes is a sports club that was founded in 1930. The club has specialised in a number of sports, including cycling, skiing, athletics, football, and ice hockey. Ice hockey was introduced at Kraft in 1970, and the team currently plays in Division II, Finland's fourth highest league. The cycling section of the club started in 1982.

Kraft is probably best known for its football club with the men's first team having played 7 seasons in the Ykkönen (First Division), the second tier of Finnish football in 1997 and 1999–2004. They also have had four spells covering 26 seasons in the third tier, the Kakkonen (Second Division), in 1976–84, 1986–96, 1998 and 2005–09. The football section broke away from the main club in 1997.

Relegation at the end of the 2009 season to the Kolmonen (Third Division) has sadly brought fourth tier football back to Mosedal. It was 25 years ago in 1985 since Kraft last played at this level.

The highest ever attendance for a Kraft match was in 1974 in when 2,406 people attended the home game with Lappfjärds Bollklubb. The largest attendance for a Kraft match at Mosedal was in 1997 in when 1,468 people attended the home game with FC Haka in the Ykkönen (First Division).

The club is now able to make use of the new Närpiö Idrottshall, "Ball Hall", which was completed in autumn 2008. The hall's size is 97.5 metres by 67 metres and has a height of 16 metres. The venue is able to accommodate an artificial turf pitch 90 metres by 60 metres.

== Season to season ==
Season to season of Närpes Kraft

Season	Level	Division	Section	Administration	Position	Movements
1948	Tier 4	Aluesarja (Fourth Division)		Vaasa District (SPL Vaasa)		
1949	Tier 3	Maakuntasarja (Third Division)	North Group B	Finnish FA (Suomen Pallolitto)	5th	
1950	Tier 3	Maakuntasarja (Third Division)	North Group B	Finnish FA (Suomen Pallolitto)	6th	Relegated
1951	Tier 4	Aluesarja (Fourth Division)		Vaasa District (SPL Vaasa)		
1952	Tier 4	Aluesarja (Fourth Division)		Vaasa District (SPL Vaasa)		
1953	Tier 4	Aluesarja (Fourth Division)		Vaasa District (SPL Vaasa)		
1954	Unknown					
1955	Tier 4	Aluesarja (Fourth Division)		Vaasa District (SPL Vaasa)		
1956	Tier 4	Aluesarja (Fourth Division)	Group 9	Finnish FA (Suomen Pallolitto)	1st	Promoted
1957	Tier 3	Maakuntasarja (Third Division)	North Group I	Finnish FA (Suomen Pallolitto)	8th	
1958	Tier 3	Maakuntasarja (Third Division)	Group 4	Finnish FA (Suomen Pallolitto)	7th	
1959	Tier 3	Maakuntasarja (Third Division)	Group 5	Finnish FA (Suomen Pallolitto)	3rd	
1960	Tier 3	Maakuntasarja (Third Division)	Group 4	Finnish FA (Suomen Pallolitto)	7th	
1961	Tier 3	Maakuntasarja (Third Division)	Group 6	Finnish FA (Suomen Pallolitto)	4th	
1962	Tier 3	Maakuntasarja (Third Division)	Group 6	Finnish FA (Suomen Pallolitto)	4th	
1963	Tier 3	Maakuntasarja (Third Division)	Group 8	Finnish FA (Suomen Pallolitto)	4th	
1964	Tier 3	Maakuntasarja (Third Division)	Group 8	Finnish FA (Suomen Pallolitto)	3rd	
1965	Tier 3	Maakuntasarja (Third Division)	Group 8	Finnish FA (Suomen Pallolitto)	5th	
1966	Tier 3	Maakuntasarja (Third Division)	Group 5	Finnish FA (Suomen Pallolitto)	4th	
1967	Tier 3	Maakuntasarja (Third Division)	Group 9	Finnish FA (Suomen Pallolitto)	4th	
1968	Tier 3	Maakuntasarja (Third Division)	Group 7	Finnish FA (Suomen Pallolitto)	2nd	
1969	Tier 3	Maakuntasarja (Third Division)	Group 7	Finnish FA (Suomen Pallolitto)	6th	
1970	Tier 3	III Divisioona (Third Division)	Group 7	Finnish FA (Suomen Pallolitto)	7th	
1971	Tier 3	III Divisioona (Third Division)	Group 6	Finnish FA (Suomen Pallolitto)	5th	
1972	Tier 3	III Divisioona (Third Division)	Group 8	Finnish FA (Suomen Pallolitto)	3rd	
1973	Tier 4	III Divisioona (Third Division)	Group 8	Finnish FA (Suomen Pallolitto)	3rd	
1974	Tier 4	III Divisioona (Third Division)	Group 8	Finnish FA (Suomen Pallolitto)	2nd	
1975	Tier 4	III Divisioona (Third Division)	Group 8	Finnish FA (Suomen Pallolitto)	1st	Promoted
1976	Tier 3	II Divisioona (Second Division)	West Group	Finnish FA (Suomen Pallolitto)	6th	
1977	Tier 3	II Divisioona (Second Division)	West Group	Finnish FA (Suomen Pallolitto)	4th	
1978	Tier 3	II Divisioona (Second Division)	West Group	Finnish FA (Suomen Pallolitto)	2nd	
1979	Tier 3	II Divisioona (Second Division)	West Group	Finnish FA (Suomen Pallolitto)	2nd	Promotion Playoff
1980	Tier 3	II Divisioona (Second Division)	North Group	Finnish FA (Suomen Pallolitto)	5th	
1981	Tier 3	II Divisioona (Second Division)	North Group	Finnish FA (Suomen Pallolitto)	5th	
1982	Tier 3	II Divisioona (Second Division)	North Group	Finnish FA (Suomen Pallolitto)	6th	
1983	Tier 3	II Divisioona (Second Division)	North Group	Finnish FA (Suomen Pallolitto)	4th	
1984	Tier 3	II Divisioona (Second Division)	North Group	Finnish FA (Suomen Pallolitto)	10th	Relegated
1985	Tier 4	III Divisioona (Third Division)	Group 8	Finnish FA (Suomen Pallolitto)	1st	Promoted
1986	Tier 3	II Divisioona (Second Division)	North Group	Finnish FA (Suomen Pallolitto)	3rd	
1987	Tier 3	II Divisioona (Second Division)	West Group	Finnish FA (Suomen Pallolitto)	2nd	
1988	Tier 3	II Divisioona (Second Division)	North Group	Finnish FA (Suomen Pallolitto)	6th	
1989	Tier 3	II Divisioona (Second Division)	North Group	Finnish FA (Suomen Pallolitto)	3rd	
1990	Tier 3	II Divisioona (Second Division)	North Group	Finnish FA (Suomen Pallolitto)	2nd	
1991	Tier 3	II Divisioona (Second Division)	North Group	Finnish FA (Suomen Pallolitto)	3rd	
1992	Tier 3	II Divisioona (Second Division)	North Group	Finnish FA (Suomen Pallolitto)	8th	
1993	Tier 3	II Divisioona (Second Division)	North Group	Finnish FA (Suomen Pallolitto)	6th	
1994	Tier 3	Kakkonen (Second Division)	North Group	Finnish FA (Suomen Pallolitto)	4th	
1995	Tier 3	Kakkonen (Second Division)	West Group	Finnish FA (Suomen Pallolitto)	9th	
1996	Tier 3	Kakkonen (Second Division)	West Group	Finnish FA (Suomen Pallolitto)	1st	Promoted
1997	Tier 2	Ykkönen (First Division)	North Group	Finnish FA (Suomen Pallolitto)	10th	Relegation Group North – Relegated
1998	Tier 3	Kakkonen (Second Division)	West Group	Finnish FA (Suomen Pallolitto)	2nd	Promoted
1999	Tier 2	Ykkönen (First Division)	North Group	Finnish FA (Suomen Pallolitto)	9th	Relegation Group North – Play-offs
2000	Tier 2	Ykkönen (First Division)	North Group	Finnish FA (Suomen Pallolitto)	9th	Relegation Group North – Play-offs
2001	Tier 2	Ykkönen (First Division)	North Group	Finnish FA (Suomen Pallolitto)	6th	
2002	Tier 2	Ykkönen (First Division)	Northern Group	Finnish FA (Suomen Pallolitto)	6th	Relegation Group North – Play-offs
2003	Tier 2	Ykkönen (First Division)		Finnish FA (Suomen Pallolitto)	6th	
2004	Tier 2	Ykkönen (First Division)		Finnish FA (Suomen Pallolitto)	12th	Relegated
2005	Tier 3	Kakkonen (Second Division)	West Group	Finnish FA (Suomen Pallolitto)	7th	
2006	Tier 3	Kakkonen (Second Division)	Group C	Finnish FA (Suomen Pallolitto)	6th	
2007	Tier 3	Kakkonen (Second Division)	Group C	Finnish FA (Suomen Pallolitto)	11th	
2008	Tier 3	Kakkonen (Second Division)	Group C	Finnish FA (Suomen Pallolitto)	10th	
2009	Tier 3	Kakkonen (Second Division)	Group B	Finnish FA (Suomen Pallolitto)	13th	Relegated
2010	Tier 4	Kolmonen (Third Division)	Central Ostrobothnia and Vaasa	Vaasa District (SPL Vaasa)	1st	Promoted
2011	Tier 3	Kakkonen (Second Division)	Group B	Finnish FA (Suomen Pallolitto)	4th	
2012	Tier 3	Kakkonen (Second Division)	Western	Finnish FA (Suomen Pallolitto)	5th	
2013	Tier 3	Kakkonen (Second Division)	Western	Finnish FA (Suomen Pallolitto)	5th	
2014	Tier 3	Kakkonen (Second Division)	Western	Finnish FA (Suomen Pallolitto)	3rd	
2015	Tier 3	Kakkonen (Second Division)	Western	Finnish FA (Suomen Pallolitto)	6th	
2016	Tier 3	Kakkonen (Second Division)	Group C	Finnish FA (Suomen Pallolitto)	7th	
2017	Tier 3	Kakkonen (Second Division)	Group C	Finnish FA (Suomen Pallolitto)	4th	
2018	Tier 3	Kakkonen (Second Division)	Group C	Finnish FA (Suomen Pallolitto)	11th	Relegated
2019	Tier 4	Kolmonen (Third Division)	Central Ostrobothnia and Vaasa	Vaasa District (SPL Vaasa)	2nd	
2020	Tier 4	Kolmonen (Third Division)	Central Ostrobothnia and Vaasa	Vaasa district (SPL Vaasa)	1st	Promotion Group 1st - Promoted
2021	Tier 3	Kakkonen (Second Division)	Group C	Finnish FA (Suomen Pallolitto)	10th	
2022	Tier 3	Kakkonen (Second Division)	Group C	Finnish FA (Suomen Pallolitto)	5th	
2023	Tier 3	Kakkonen (Second Division)	Group C	Finnish FA (Suomen Pallolitto)	9th	
2024	Tier 4	Kakkonen (Second Division)	Group C	Finnish FA (Suomen Pallolitto)	4th	
2025	Tier 4	Kakkonen (Second Division)	Group C	Finnish FA (Suomen Pallolitto)		

- 7 seasons in 2nd Tier
- 55 seasons in 3rd Tier
- 15 season in 4th Tier

== Club structure ==
Närpes Kraft Fotbollsförening run a large number of teams including 2 men's teams, 1 ladies team, 7 boys teams and 4 girls teams.

== 2010 season ==
Kraft Men's Team are competing in the Kolmonen (Third Division) section administered by the Vaasa SPL. This is the fourth highest tier in the Finnish football system. In 2009 Kraft finished in 13th place in Group B of the Kakkonen (Second Division) and were relegated.

Kraft /2 are participating in the Nelonen (Fourth Division) administered by the Vaasa SPL.

== Current squad ==
Note: Flags indicate national team as defined under FIFA eligibility rules; some limited exceptions apply. Players may hold more than one non-FIFA nationality.

No.	Pos.	Nation	Player
1	GK	FIN	Karl-Filip Eriksson
2	DF	FIN	Willy Öhman
3	DF	FIN	Simon Backman
4	DF	FIN	Petter Rausk
5	DF	FIN	Jacob Åbonde
6	DF	FIN	Tony Lund
7	FW	UKR	Andriy Yakovlyev
8	MF	CRO	Vanja Pobor
9	FW	FIN	Jonas Granfors
10	MF	BIH	Edis Elkaz
11	FW	COL	Daniel Garcia Montoya
12	GK	FIN	Jakob Lund

No.	Pos.	Nation	Player
13	FW	FIN	Kim Böling
14	MF	FIN	Lavinius Marca
15	FW	BIH	Sifet Bečić
17	FW	SWE	Mikael Johansson
18	MF	FIN	Dennis Norrback
19	MF	FIN	Filip Lapveteläinen
20	FW	BIH	Benaris Karamović
21	MF	FIN	Oskar Ivars
22	MF	FIN	Jacob Lapveteläinen
31	GK	FIN	Lukas Backman
-	MF	ENG	Danny O'Brien
