= Daniel Krch =

Czech footballer (born 1992

Personal information
- Date of birth: 20 March 1992 (age 34)
- Place of birth: Tábor, Czechoslovakia
- Height: 1.80 m (5 ft 11 in)
- Position: Defender

Youth career
- 1999–2006: FK Tábor
- 2006–2009: Sparta Prague

Senior career*
Years	Team	Apps	(Gls)
2009–2014	Sparta Prague B	28	(1)
2013	→ Táborsko (loan)	12	(2)
2013–2014	→ Bohemians 1905 (loan)	16	(0)
2014–2022	Bohemians 1905	144	(9)
2023–2024	Dukla Prague	14	(3)

International career
2007–2008	Czech Republic U16	11	(1)
2008–2009	Czech Republic U17	16	(2)
2009–2010	Czech Republic U18	9	(1)
2010	Czech Republic U19	6	(0)
- * Club domestic league appearances and goals

Daniel Krch (born 20 March 1992) is a retired Czech professional footballer who played as a defender.

== Club career ==
=== Bohemians 1905 ===
Krch came to the first league on loan from AC Sparta Prague B to Bohemians 1905. He made his first league debut on 19 July 2013 in Bohemians' 5–0 away loss against FC Viktoria Plzeň. After the 2013–14 season, he transferred to Bohemians, and did not play for another club than Bohemians in the Czech First League. During the ten seasons he spent at Bohemians, he played 160 matches and became a notable figure of the club's modern history. He was also a captain for a while. In Autumn 2022, he joined the management of the club.

=== Dukla Prague ===
In January 2023, he transferred to Dukla Prague. After the 2023–24 season, in which he played only 14 games due to health problems, Krch announced his retirement. He moved into the role of assistant coach and only plays football at an amateur level.

== International career ==
He made several appearances for Czech Republic youth national teams, last for U19 team in 2010.
