= Ilya Pukhov =

Belarusian footballer

Personal information
- Date of birth: 12 May 1992 (age 34)
- Place of birth: Kopyl, Minsk Oblast, Belarus
- Height: 1.81 m (5 ft 11 in)
- Position: Forward

Youth career
- 2009–2011: Shakhtyor Soligorsk

Senior career*
Years	Team	Apps	(Gls)
2011–2012	Shakhtyor Soligorsk	3	(0)
2013	Gorodeya	28	(11)
2014–2015	Krumkachy Minsk	37	(3)
2017	Lyuban	12	(2)
2020	Stroitel Kopyl		
2021	Kopyl	6	(0)

International career
2010	Belarus U19		
- * Club domestic league appearances and goals as of 31 December 2021

Ilya Pukhov (Belarusian: Iлля Пухаў; Russian: Илья Пухов; born 12 May 1992) is a Belarusian former professional football player.
