= Adnan Uğur =

Belgian footballer

Personal information
- Date of birth: 28 June 2001 (age 25)
- Place of birth: Diest, Belgium
- Height: 1.74 m (5 ft 9 in)
- Position: Midfielder

Team information
- Current team: Pendikspor
- Number: 77

Senior career*
Years	Team	Apps	(Gls)
2019–2022	Fortuna Sittard	6	(0)
2021	→ Dordrecht (loan)	12	(0)
2021–2022	→ Fatih Karagümrük (loan)	24	(1)
2022–2025	Fatih Karagümrük	34	(2)
2025	→ Gorica (loan)	11	(1)
2025–	Pendikspor	16	(0)

International career^{‡}
2016–2017	Belgium U16	10	(1)
2017–2018	Belgium U17	6	(0)
2018–2019	Belgium U18	3	(1)
2019–2020	Belgium U19	5	(0)
- * Club domestic league appearances and goals as of 5 May 2026 ‡ National team caps and goals as of 20 February 2020

Adnan Uğur (born 28 June 2001) is a Belgian footballer who plays as a midfielder for Turkish TFF 1. Lig club Pendikspor.

== Club career ==
Uğur signed a contract with Fortuna Sittard on 21 June 2019. Uğur made his professional debut with Fortuna Sittard in a 4–0 Eredivisie loss to AZ Alkmaar on 3 August 2019.

On 6 September 2021, he was loaned to Fatih Karagümrük in Turkey. At the end of the loan, Fatih Karagümrük exercised their option to buy, making the transfer permanent.

== International career ==
Born in Belgium, Uğur is of Turkish descent. He is a former youth international for Belgium.
