= Hasan Ahmet Sarı =

Turkish footballer

Personal information
- Date of birth: 21 January 1992 (age 34)
- Place of birth: Şişli, Turkey
- Height: 1.80 m (5 ft 11 in)
- Position: Forward

Team information
- Current team: Bulvarspor
- Number: 17

Youth career
- 2005–2008: Trabzonspor

Senior career*
Years	Team	Apps	(Gls)
2009–2015	Trabzonspor	1	(0)
2010	→ 1461 Trabzon (loan)	6	(0)
2011	→ 1461 Trabzon (loan)	15	(6)
2011–2012	→ 1461 Trabzon (loan)	13	(3)
2012	→ Giresunspor (loan)	7	(0)
2012–2013	→ Fethiyespor (loan)	25	(4)
2013–2014	→ Batman Petrolspor (loan)	34	(24)
2014–2015	→ 1461 Trabzon (loan)	31	(7)
2015–2016	Manisaspor	20	(3)
2016–2017	1461 Trabzon	29	(4)
2017–2018	Ankara Demirspor	20	(10)
2018–2019	Batman Petrolspor	11	(2)
2019–2020	Etimesgut Belediyespor	28	(8)
2020	Çankaya	3	(1)
2020–2021	Karaköprü Belediyespor	4	(0)
2021	Etimesgut Belediyespor	12	(4)
2021–2022	Çankaya	16	(6)
2022	Malatya Yeşilyurt Belediyespor	10	(2)
2022–	Bulvarspor	5	(1)

International career^{‡}
2007	Turkey U16	1	(3)
2009	Turkey U17	16	(7)
2009	Turkey U18	5	(1)
2010–2011	Turkey U19	8	(2)
2012	Turkey U21	2	(1)
- * Club domestic league appearances and goals as of 12 November 2022 ‡ National team caps and goals as of 8 September 2012

Hasan Ahmet Sarı (born 21 January 1992) is a Turkish footballer who plays as a forward for Bulvarspor in the TFF Third League. He formerly played for the Turkey under-21s.

== Life and career ==
=== Early life ===
Sarı was born in Şişli, Istanbul. He moved with his family to the city of Trabzon following the 1999 İzmit earthquake, which caused considerable destruction in the Avcılar district of the city. He was present in the family home in Avcılar at the time of the earthquake.

=== Club ===
He developed through the youth system at Trabzonspor, spending the 2008–09 season on loan to affiliated youth team Trabzonspor A2.

He made his Süper Lig debut for Trabzonspor during the following 2009–10 season. He appeared as a 71st-minute substitute for teammate Tayfun Cora in a 3–1 defeat away to Kasımpaşa on 22 November 2009.

He spent the second half of the 2010–11 season on loan to 1461 Trabzon, a local affiliate team that play in the TFF 2. Lig. He scored seven goals in 15 appearances, the first coming in a 1–1 draw against Adana Demirspor on 30 January 2011. In June 2011 he agreed a new five-year contract with Trabzonspor.

=== International ===
Sarı has achieved international recognition for Turkey at under-16, under-17 and under-19 levels. In his only game for the Turkey under-16s, he scored a hat-trick in a 4–0 friendly match victory against the Austria under-16s on 13 November 2007. He went on to represent his country in the 2009 UEFA European Under-17 Football Championship. He played in all three group matches of the final tournament and scored against the Germany under-17s as the Turkey under-17s were knocked out in the group phase.

He has also played for the Turkey under-19s in the 2011 UEFA European Under-19 Football Championship. He scored a crucial goal in the qualifying phase against the Iceland under-19s in October 2010. In the final tournament, held in Romania, he again played in all three group matches. The Turkey under-19s did not pass the first round after finishing in third place in Group B.
