= Michał Efir =

Polish footballer

Personal information
- Full name: Michał Efir
- Date of birth: 14 April 1992 (age 34)
- Place of birth: Lublin, Poland
- Height: 1.81 m (5 ft 11 in)
- Position: Forward

Youth career
- 2002–2008: Wieniawa Lublin
- 2008–2011: Legia Warsaw

Senior career*
| Years | Team | Apps | (Gls) |
| 2011–2014 | Legia Warsaw | 3 | (0) |
| 2013–2014 | Legia Warsaw II | 17 | (11) |
| 2014–2016 | Ruch Chorzów | 52 | (4) |
| 2014–2016 | Ruch Chorzów II | 15 | (8) |
| 2016 | Bytovia Bytów | 13 | (0) |
| 2018 | Lechia Tomaszów Mazowiecki | 10 | (0) |
| 2019 | Chełmianka Chełm | 16 | (3) |
| 2019 | Bałtyk Gdynia | 11 | (1) |
| 2020 | Budowlani Murzynowo | 11 | (15) |
| Total | | 148 | (42) |
- * Club domestic league appearances and goals

Michał Efir (born 14 April 1992) is a Polish former professional footballer who played as a forward.

== Career ==
Efir started his career with Legia Warsaw.

== Honours ==
Legia Warsaw

- Ekstraklasa: 2013–14
