= Denis Yakhno =

Belarusian footballer

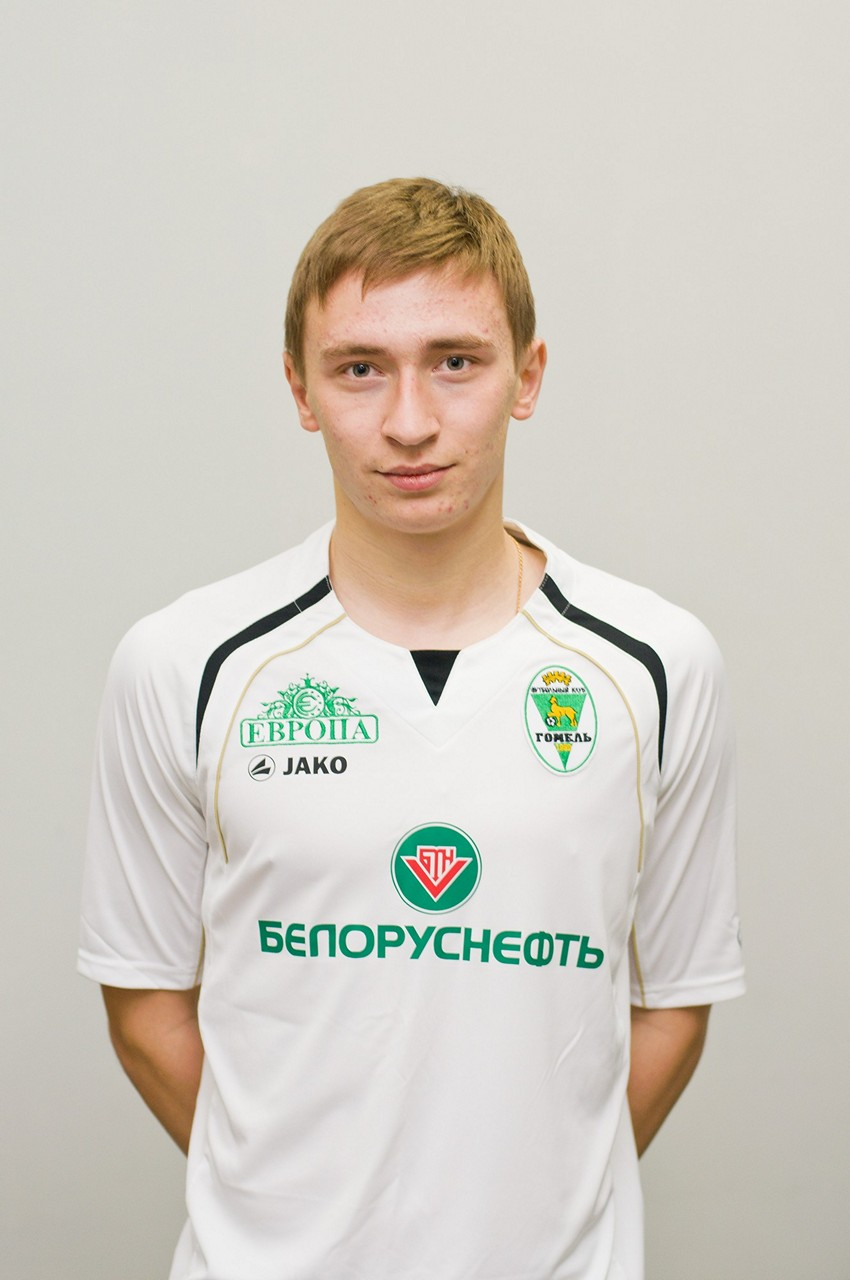

Personal information
- Date of birth: 20 November 1992 (age 33)
- Place of birth: Gomel, Belarus
- Height: 1.80 m (5 ft 11 in)
- Position: Midfielder

Team information
- Current team: Leskhoz Gomel

Youth career
- 2006–2009: Gomel

Senior career*
Years	Team	Apps	(Gls)
2010–2017	Gomel	19	(0)
2014	→ Gorodeya (loan)	5	(0)
2014	→ Gomelzheldortrans (loan)	14	(2)
2017	Osipovichi	9	(0)
2018	Sputnik Rechitsa	16	(6)
2019	Lokomotiv Gomel	0	(0)
2020	Khimik Svetlogorsk	23	(2)
2021–2022	Bumprom Gomel	29	(22)
2023–	Leskhoz Gomel	25	(31)

International career
2012	Belarus U21	10	(1)
- * Club domestic league appearances and goals as of 31 December 2023

Denis Yakhno (Belarusian: Дзяніс Яхно; Russian: Денис Яхно; born 20 November 1992) is a Belarusian professional footballer who plays for Leskhoz Gomel.
