= Pipo (footballer, born 1992) =

Portuguese footballer

Personal information
- Full name: Filipe Daniel Mendes Barros
- Date of birth: 17 April 1992 (age 34)
- Place of birth: Cristelo, Portugal
- Height: 1.65 m (5 ft 5 in)
- Position: Forward

Team information
- Current team: Rebordosa
- Number: 16

Youth career
- 2000–2002: FC Cristelo
- 2002–2011: Porto

Senior career*
Years	Team	Apps	(Gls)
2011–2012	Santa Clara	9	(2)
2012–2013	Akritas Chlorakas	14	(4)
2013	Famalicão	11	(4)
2013–2014	Ribeirão	25	(4)
2014	Oliveirense	7	(0)
2014–2015	Santa Eulália	13	(4)
2015–2016	Vila Real	32	(6)
2016–2018	Tirsense	62	(23)
2018–2019	Freamunde	21	(8)
2019–	Rebordosa	67	(24)

International career
2008	Portugal U16	5	(1)
2008–2009	Portugal U17	16	(13)
2009–2010	Portugal U18	7	(3)
2010–2011	Portugal U19	13	(4)
2012	Portugal U20	5	(1)
2013	Portugal U21	1	(0)
- * Club domestic league appearances and goals as of 16:41, 21 March 2022 (UTC)

Filipe Daniel Mendes Barros (born 17 April 1992), commonly known as Pipo, is a Portuguese footballer who plays for Rebordosa A.C. as a forward.
