= Elliot Lindberg =

Swedish footballer

Personal information
- Full name: Elliot Lindberg
- Date of birth: 13 March 1992 (age 34)
- Place of birth: Sweden
- Height: 1.77 m (5 ft 10 in)
- Position: Defender

Team information
- Current team: Väsby United

Youth career
- Bollstanäs SK

Senior career*
Years	Team	Apps	(Gls)
2010–2011	Brommapojkarna	2	(0)
2011	→ Valsta Syrianska IK (loan)	12	(0)
2012–	Väsby United	7	(0)

International career
2007–2009	Sweden U17	13	(0)
2009–2011	Sweden U19	9	(0)
- * Club domestic league appearances and goals

Elliot Lindberg (born 13 March 1992) is a Swedish footballer who plays for Väsby United as a defender.
