= Mark Janssen =

Dutch footballer

Personal information
- Full name: Mark Janssen
- Date of birth: 10 May 1992 (age 34)
- Place of birth: Eindhoven, Netherlands
- Height: 1.84 m (6 ft 0 in)
- Position: Striker

Youth career
- Brabantia
- Willem II

Senior career*
Years	Team	Apps	(Gls)
2011–2014	RKC Waalwijk	6	(0)
2013–2014	→ Helmond Sport (loan)	36	(7)
2014	JVC Cuijk	3	(0)
2015–2016	UNA	30	(9)
2017–2019	VV Geldrop		
2019–2021	RKSVO Ospel		
- * Club domestic league appearances and goals

Mark Janssen (born 10 May 1992) is a retired Dutch footballer who played as a striker. He formerly played on loan for Helmond Sport.
