= Ivan Plum =

Croatian footballer

Personal information
- Date of birth: 6 May 1992 (age 34)
- Place of birth: Zagreb, Croatia
- Height: 1.73 m (5 ft 8 in)
- Positions: Left winger; forward

Team information
- Current team: Mitnica

Youth career
- 2001–2004: Croatia Bogdanovci
- 2004–2006: Vukovar '91
- 2006–2010: Osijek

Senior career*
Years	Team	Apps	(Gls)
2010	Osijek	2	(0)
2011	Dinamo Zagreb	0	(0)
2011	→ Radnik Sesvete (loan)	12	(1)
2012	Gorica	24	(1)
2013–2019	Vukovar '91		
2019–2020	Mladost Cerić		
2020–2022	Vukovar 1991		
2022–	Mitnica		

International career
2007	Croatia U15	4	(1)
2007–2008	Croatia U16	7	(0)
2008–2009	Croatia U17	11	(3)
2009–2010	Croatia U18	5	(1)
2010–2011	Croatia U19	14	(0)
- * Club domestic league appearances and goals as of 14 November 2011

Ivan Plum (born 6 May 1992 in Osijek) is a Croatian football striker, currently playing for HNK Mitnica Vukovar.

== Club career ==
Plum started his career playing at youth level for Osijek. For his performances in the 2008–09 youth season (Kadeti), he was declared player of the year by Sportske novosti. He made his debut for the first team in the 2009–10 Prva HNL season against Croatia Sesvete on 20 March 2010, when he replaced Petar Stojkić for the final fifteen minutes of the match. Next season he also got the chance as a substitute, this time in a 3–0 away defeat against Cibalia. In January 2011, he was transferred to Dinamo Zagreb along with his brother Hrvoje in a package deal worth €300,000. Immediately after the transfer, Plum was loaned to Treća HNL side Radnik Sesvete and helped them reach promotion to Druga HNL. He was resent to Radnik Sesvete for the first part of the 2011/2012 season, but failed to leave a mark, which led to his contract being annulled. After a year at HNK Gorica at the same level, he returned to his lower-tier hometown club HNK Vukovar '91.

== Career stats ==
Season	Club	League	Apps	Goals
2009–10	Osijek	Prva HNL	1	0
2010–11	Osijek	Prva HNL	1	0
2010–11	Radnik Sesvete	Treća HNL	8	1
2011–12	Radnik Sesvete	Druga HNL	4	0
2011–12	Gorica	Druga HNL	14	1
2012–13	Gorica	Druga HNL	10	0

Last updated on 24 October 2014
