= Croatian Disabled Homeland War Veterans' Association =

Disability organization in Croatia

The Croatian Disabled Homeland War Veterans' Association (Croatian: Udruga hrvatskih vojnih invalida iz domovinskog rata, HVIDRA) is an association of disabled Croatian war veterans who fought in the Croatian Homeland War or the War in Bosnia and Herzegovina. As of 2004, the association had about 33,000 members in Croatia.

The association, established on 25 February 1992, is organized locally throughout Croatia, where it comprises mostly former members of the Croatian Army, and through many parts of Bosnia and Herzegovina where it comprises former members of the Croatian Defence Council. There are also two national umbrella organizations. The Croatian Ministry of Family Affairs, War Veterans and Intergenerational Solidarity grants former soldiers the official status of disabled veterans if they suffered over 20% disability in the war. HVIDRA is one of the most vocal veteran associations in Croatia, frequently weighing in on the nation's politics.

HVIDRA's president in Croatia is Josip Đakić and in Bosnia and Herzegovina it is Anđelko Barun.
