= Kim Böling =

Finnish footballer (born 1992)

Personal information
- Date of birth: 4 February 1992 (age 34)
- Place of birth: Närpes, Finland
- Height: 1.85 m (6 ft 1 in)
- Position: Striker

Team information
- Current team: Närpes Kraft
- Number: 30

Senior career*
Years	Team	Apps	(Gls)
2007–2010	Närpes Kraft		
2010–2013	VPS	46	(0)
2010	→ Närpes Kraft (loan)	9	(7)
2013–2017	Närpes Kraft	98	(38)
2017	VPS	16	(2)
2018	FF Jaro	16	(1)
2019–	Närpes Kraft	60	(32)
- * Club domestic league appearances and goals as of 15:56, 23 February 2023 (UTC)

Kim Böling (born 4 February 1992) is a Finnish professional footballer who plays as a midfielder for Kakkonen club Närpes Kraft.
