= Aleksandar Simović (footballer) =

Serbian footballer

Personal information
- Full name: Aleksandar Simović
- Date of birth: 30 January 1992 (age 34)
- Place of birth: Belgrade, SFR Yugoslavia
- Height: 1.85 m (6 ft 1 in)
- Position: Midfielder

Youth career
- Red Star Belgrade

Senior career*
Years	Team	Apps	(Gls)
2010–2013	BSK Borča	20	(2)
2011	→ Dorćol (loan)	10	(0)
2013	AO Trikala		
2014-2016	BSK Borča	5	(0)
2017-	Ocean City		
- * Club domestic league appearances and goals as of 6 August 2014

Aleksandar Simović (Serbian Cyrillic: Александар Симовић; born 30 January 1992) is a Serbian football midfielder.
