= Cristelo (Paredes) =

- Civil parish
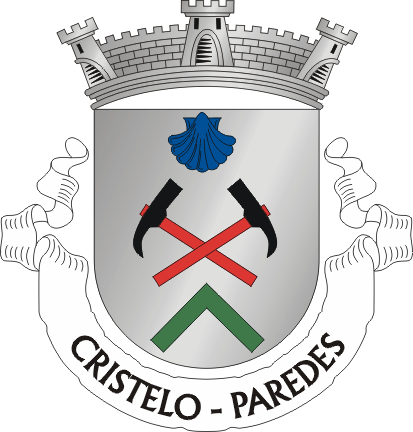
- Coat of arms

- Location in Portugal
- Coordinates: 41.229°N 8.360°W
- Country: Portugal
- Region: Norte
- Metropolitan area: Porto
- District: Porto
- Municipality: Paredes

Area
  - Total: 2.02 km^{2} (0.78 sq mi)

Population (2011)
  - Total: 1,891
  - Density: 940/km^{2} (2,400/sq mi)
- Time zone: UTC+00:00 (WET)
  - Summer (DST): UTC+01:00 (WEST)

Cristelo is a parish of the municipality of Paredes, Portugal. The population in 2011 was 1,891, in an area of 2.02 km^{2}.
