= Michał Jonczyk =

Polish footballer (born 1992)

Personal information
- Full name: Michał Jonczyk
- Date of birth: 11 March 1992 (age 34)
- Place of birth: Piotrków Trybunalski, Poland
- Height: 1.80 m (5 ft 11 in)
- Positions: Winger; striker

Youth career
- 2001–2005: Piotrcovia Piotrków Trybunalski
- 2005–2008: GKS Bełchatów
- 2009: Wisła Kraków

Senior career*
Years	Team	Apps	(Gls)
2008	Płomień Jerzmanowice	6	(5)
2009–2010	Sandecja Nowy Sącz	26	(7)
2010–2013	Górnik Zabrze	15	(2)
2013–2014	Widzew Łódź	3	(0)
2014	→ Motor Lublin (loan)	6	(3)

International career
2007	Poland U15	5	(4)
2007–2008	Poland U16	10	(4)
2008–2009	Poland U17	13	(6)
2009	Poland U18	1	(0)
2009–2010	Poland U19	4	(1)
- * Club domestic league appearances and goals

Michał Jonczyk (born 11 March 1992) is a Polish former professional footballer.

== Club career ==
Jonczyk began his career when he was 9 years old at Piotrcovia Piotrków Trybunalski, but moved to GKS Bełchatów when Piotrcovia youth team disbanded in 2005. He played as a striker, but was also known to play on the left wing. In December 2007, he joined Sampdoria for a trial, and was shortly after invited by Fulham on the same basis. In August 2008, he joined IV liga club Płomień Jerzmanowice. He was the best goal scorer of Płomień in spring 2008, scoring five goals in six matches. In March 2009, he moved to Wisła Kraków's Młoda Ekstraklasa team. On 4 July 2009, he signed a two-year contract with Sandecja Nowy Sącz. He made 26 I liga appearances and scored 7 goals. In June 2010, he signed a three-year contract with Ekstraklasa side Górnik Zabrze.

== International career ==
Jonczyk made his debut for the Poland under-15s team on 17 April 2007, scored twice against Slovakia. He played for the under-16 team in 2007 and 2008. In 2008 and 2009, he played for the under-17s. He played in all three matches in UEFA European Under-17 Championship qualifying round and scored two goals in matches against Montenegro and Azerbaijan. On 26 March 2009 Jonczyk scored two goals in UEFA European Under-17 Championship elite round match against Slovenia. On 31 March 2009, he scored two goals in UEFA European Under-17 Championship elite round match against Greece. On 13 August 2009, he played his first match for Poland national under-19 football team. Two days later, he scored his first goal for Poland U19 against Moldova.
