= 2018 Supercoppa Italiana =

- Event: Supercoppa Italiana
| Juventus | AC Milan |
| Serie A | Coppa Italia |
| 1 | 0 |
- Date: 16 January 2019
- Venue: King Abdullah Sports City, Jeddah
- Referee: Luca Banti
- Attendance: 61,235

The 2018 Supercoppa Italiana was the 31st edition of the Supercoppa Italiana. It was played on 16 January 2019 at King Abdullah Sports City in Jeddah, Saudi Arabia. With Juventus winning both the 2017–18 Serie A championship and the 2017–18 Coppa Italia, the game was played between Juventus and the 2017–18 Coppa Italia runners-up, AC Milan.

This was the third meeting between the two teams in the Supercoppa Italiana. Juventus won the first meeting in 2003 in East Rutherford, New Jersey, United States on penalties, and AC Milan returned the favour, also on penalties in 2016 in Qatar. Both teams before the match had a record seven Supercoppa titles. Saudi Arabia became the sixth different country to host a Supercoppa Italiana. Juventus won the match, with the only goal coming from Cristiano Ronaldo in the 61st minute, and became the first club to win eight Supercoppa Italiana titles.

== Venue ==
On June 6, 2018, it was announced that the match would take place in January 2019 in Saudi Arabia as part of an agreement to play three of the next five editions of the tournament in that territory. This was the tenth time that the Supercoppa Italiana was held outside Italy after the editions of 1993, 2002, 2003, 2009, 2011, 2012, 2014, 2015 and 2016. Subsequently, on December 5, 2018, the Lega Serie A announced that the match would be played on 16 January 2019 at the King Abdullah Sports City in Jeddah, being the first international football tournament to be held at the stadium since its inauguration in 2014.

| Location of the host city of the 2018 Supercoppa Italiana. | City | Stadium |
|---|---|---|
| Location of the host city of the 2018 Supercoppa Italiana. | Jeddah | King Abdullah Sports City |
| Location of the host city of the 2018 Supercoppa Italiana. | Capacity: 62,345 | |

== Match ==
=== Details ===
16 January 2019
20:30 AST

| Juventus | 1–0 | AC Milan |
|---|---|---|
| Ronaldo 61' | Report |

King Abdullah Sports City, Jeddah (Saudi Arabia)
Attendance: 61,235
Referee: Luca Banti

| Juventus | AC Milan |

| GK | 1 | (Poland) Wojciech Szczęsny |
| RB | 20 | (Portugal) João Cancelo |
| CB | 19 | (Italy) Leonardo Bonucci |
| CB | 3 | (Italy) Giorgio Chiellini (c) |
| LB | 12 | (Brazil) Alex Sandro | (yellow card) 26' |
| CM | 30 | (Uruguay) Rodrigo Bentancur | | (substituted off) 86' |
| CM | 5 | (Bosnia and Herzegovina) Miralem Pjanić | (yellow card) 44' | (substituted off) 64' |
| CM | 14 | (France) Blaise Matuidi |
| RW | 10 | (Argentina) Paulo Dybala | (yellow card) 90+4' |
| LW | 11 | (Brazil) Douglas Costa | | (substituted off) 89' |
| CF | 7 | (Portugal) Cristiano Ronaldo |
Substitutes:
| GK | 21 | (Italy) Carlo Pinsoglio |
| GK | 22 | (Italy) Mattia Perin |
| GK | 32 | (Italy) Mattia Del Favero |
| DF | 2 | (Italy) Mattia De Sciglio |
| DF | 24 | (Italy) Daniele Rugani |
| DF | 37 | (Italy) Leonardo Spinazzola |
| MF | 6 | (Germany) Sami Khedira | | (substituted on) 89' |
| MF | 23 | (Germany) Emre Can | | (substituted on) 64' |
| FW | 18 | (Italy) Moise Kean |
| FW | 33 | (Italy) Federico Bernardeschi | | (substituted on) 86' |
Manager:
(Italy) Massimiliano Allegri

| GK | 99 | (Italy) Gianluigi Donnarumma |
| RB | 2 | (Italy) Davide Calabria | (yellow card) 82' |
| CB | 17 | (Colombia) Cristián Zapata |
| CB | 13 | (Italy) Alessio Romagnoli (c) | (yellow card) 74' |
| LB | 68 | (Switzerland) Ricardo Rodriguez | (yellow card) 87' |
| CM | 79 | (Ivory Coast) Franck Kessié | (red card) 74' |
| CM | 14 | (France) Tiémoué Bakayoko |
| CM | 39 | (Brazil) Lucas Paquetá | | (substituted off) 71' |
| RW | 7 | (Spain) Samu Castillejo | (yellow card) 45+2' | (substituted off) 71' |
| LW | 10 | (Turkey) Hakan Çalhanoğlu | (yellow card) 21' |
| CF | 63 | (Italy) Patrick Cutrone | | (substituted off) 79' |
Substitutes:
| GK | 25 | (Spain) Pepe Reina |
| GK | 90 | (Italy) Antonio Donnarumma |
| DF | 12 | (Italy) Andrea Conti | | (substituted on) 79' |
| DF | 20 | (Italy) Ignazio Abate |
| DF | 22 | (Argentina) Mateo Musacchio |
| DF | 23 | (Croatia) Ivan Strinić |
| DF | 93 | (Uruguay) Diego Laxalt |
| MF | 4 | (Italy) José Mauri |
| MF | 16 | (Italy) Andrea Bertolacci |
| MF | 18 | (Italy) Riccardo Montolivo |
| FW | 9 | (Argentina) Gonzalo Higuaín | | (substituted on) 71' |
| FW | 11 | (Italy) Fabio Borini | | (substituted on) 71' |
Manager:
(Italy) Gennaro Gattuso

Assistant referees:
Fabiano Preti
Matteo Passeri
Fourth official:
Marco Di Bello
Reserve assistant referee:
Daniele Bindoni
Video assistant referee:
Marco Guida
Assistant video assistant referees:
Gianluca Vuoto

Match rules

- 90 minutes
- 30 minutes of extra time if necessary
- Penalty shoot-out if scores still level
- Twelve named substitutes, of which up to three may be used.

== Controversy ==
Following the murder of the dissident Saudi journalist Jamal Khashoggi in the Saudi embassy in Turkey in October 2018, activists and humanitarian associations including Amnesty International have appealed to both the finalist teams and Lega Serie A for the match not to be played in Saudi Arabia. Amnesty International indicated the event as an attempt to "rebrand" its tarnished image, known as "sportswashing".

Matteo Salvini, the deputy prime minister of Italy, also labelled the decision to play the match in Saudi Arabia as "disgusting" due to laws regarding women attending the match. Laura Boldrini stated that "the lords of football should not be allowed to trade women's rights." President of Lega Serie A Gaetano Micciché noted progress compared to a year ago when no women at all were allowed in the stadium. Women will only be allowed in one section of the stadium, which comprises around 15 percent of the 60,000 seats, and will not be allowed to sit elsewhere in the stadium. However, Micciché has defended the decision to host the Supercoppa in Saudi Arabia stating that this will help to promote the Italian game to a worldwide audience. He also said that women in Saudi Arabia are allowed to attend matches since January 2018, adding that women will be able to sit in family area.

The Serie A's MENA rightsholder beIN Sports condemned the hosting of the Supercoppa in Saudi Arabia in response to the pirate broadcaster BeoutQ. beIN Sports had been forced to cease offering its services in Saudi Arabia due to the Qatar diplomatic crisis, which has led to BeoutQ illegally retransmitting its programming in the country as an alternative outlet. beIN Sports has repeatedly accused the service of operating from within Saudi Arabia. In November 2019, beIN Sports threatened to cut its ties with the Serie A over the Saudi deal, accusing it of "making a quick buck from the very entity that has been stealing its rights for two years."

== See also ==
- 2018–19 Serie A
- 2018–19 Coppa Italia
- 2018–19 AC Milan season
- 2018–19 Juventus FC season
- Juventus FC–AC Milan rivalry
