= 2018–19 AC Milan season =

Milan
2018–19 season
- Chairman: Paolo Scaroni (from 21 July)
- Head coach: Gennaro Gattuso
- Stadium: San Siro
- Serie A: 5th
- Coppa Italia: Semi-finals
- Supercoppa Italiana: Runners-up
- UEFA Europa League: Group stage
- Top goalscorer: League: Krzysztof Piątek (9); All: Krzysztof Piątek (11)
Home colours	Away colours	Third colours

The 2018–19 season was the 120th season in Associazione Calcio Milan's history and their 85th (108th overall) in the top-flight of Italian football. Milan competed in Serie A, the Coppa Italia, the UEFA Europa League and the Supercoppa Italiana.

Milan qualified for the 2018–19 UEFA Europa League group stage as the sixth-placed team of the previous season, but were originally banned by UEFA from European competition due to violations of Financial Fair Play regulations for failure to break-even. On 10 July 2018, Li Yonghong failed to keep up with his loan repayment plan, neglecting to deposit a €32 million installment on time in order to keep refinancing the €303 million loan debt owed to Elliott Management Corporation. As a result, ownership of the club was immediately transferred to the American hedge fund. Milan appealed to the Court of Arbitration for Sport, and the ban was overturned on 20 July 2018. Following the shareholders' meeting held on 21 July 2018, all previous directors, including Marco Fassone and Massimiliano Mirabelli, were officially dismissed, with Paolo Scaroni becoming the new chairman of the club, replacing Li Yonghong. In the summer of 2018, Leonardo returned to Milan as a sporting director, while the club's hall of fame player Paolo Maldini was hired for the first time as a sporting strategy and development director. In September 2018, the club hired a new CEO, Ivan Gazidis, who had previously worked with Arsenal for over a decade and began his work with Milan on 1 December 2018.

Once again, the club failed to achieve its primary objective of qualifying for the Champions League, either through winning the Europa League (Milan suffered a group stage elimination), or finishing in the top 4 of the national league competition, i.e. Serie A. On 28 May 2019, following an unsatisfactory result, both Leonardo and Gennaro Gattuso announced their resignations, with the latter donating his entire €5,5 million severance package back to the club.

Having taken a week to contemplate his future, on 14 June 2019 Maldini assumed the role of a technical director responsible for the "planning and development of the club's sporting area". On the same day, another club legend Zvonimir Boban was appointed Chief Football Officer, overseeing the club's sporting area.

== Players ==
=== Squad information ===
As of 30 June 2019.

No.	Player	Nat.	Position(s)	Date of birth (age)	Signed in	Contract ends	Signed from	Transfer fee	Notes	Apps	Goals
Goalkeepers
25	Pepe Reina	(Spain)	GK	31 August 1982 (aged 36)	2018	2021	(Italy) Napoli	Free		12	0
35	Alessandro Plizzari	(Italy)	GK	12 March 2000 (aged 19)	2016	2020	(Italy) Milan Primavera	Free	From Youth system	0	0
90	Antonio Donnarumma	(Italy)	GK	7 July 1990 (aged 28)	2017	2021	(Greece) Asteras Tripolis	€300,000	From Youth system	2	0
99	Gianluigi Donnarumma	(Italy)	GK	25 February 1999 (aged 20)	2015	2021	(Italy) Milan Primavera	Free	From Youth system	164	0
Defenders
2	Davide Calabria	(Italy)	RB / LB	6 December 1996 (aged 22)	2015	2022	(Italy) Milan Primavera	Free	From Youth system	85	2
12	Andrea Conti	(Italy)	RB	2 March 1994 (aged 25)	2017	2022	(Italy) Atalanta	€24,000,000		20	0
13	Alessio Romagnoli	(Italy)	CB / LB	12 January 1995 (aged 24)	2015	2022	(Italy) Roma	€25,000,000		152	7
17	Cristián Zapata	(Colombia)	CB / RB	30 September 1986 (aged 32)	2012	2019	(Spain) Villarreal	€6,000,000		149	5
20	Ignazio Abate	(Italy)	RB / CB	12 November 1986 (aged 32)	2009	2019	(Italy) Torino	€2,800,000	From Youth system	306	3
22	Mateo Musacchio	(Argentina)	CB	26 August 1990 (aged 28)	2017	2021	(Spain) Villarreal	€18,000,000		55	2
23	Ivan Strinić	(Croatia)	LB	17 July 1987 (aged 31)	2018	2021	(Italy) Sampdoria	Free		0	0
33	Mattia Caldara	(Italy)	CB	5 May 1994 (aged 25)	2018	2022	(Italy) Juventus	€35,000,000		2	0
68	Ricardo Rodriguez	(Switzerland)	LB / CB	25 August 1992 (aged 26)	2017	2021	(Germany) VfL Wolfsburg	€15,000,000		88	4
93	Diego Laxalt	(Uruguay)	LB / LW	7 February 1993 (aged 26)	2018	2022	(Italy) Genoa	€14,000,000		29	0
Midfielders
4	José Mauri	(Italy) (Argentina)	CM / DM	16 May 1996 (aged 23)	2015	2019	(Italy) Parma	Free		21	0
5	Giacomo Bonaventura	(Italy)	CM / LW	22 August 1989 (aged 29)	2014	2020	(Italy) Atalanta	€7,000,000		152	31
14	Tiémoué Bakayoko	(France)	CM / DM	17 August 1994 (aged 24)	2018	2019	(England) Chelsea	€5,000,000	Loan	42	1
16	Andrea Bertolacci	(Italy)	CM	11 January 1991 (aged 28)	2015	2019	(Italy) Roma	€20,000,000		54	2
18	Riccardo Montolivo	(Italy)	DM / CM	18 January 1985 (aged 34)	2012	2019	(Italy) Fiorentina	Free		158	10
21	Lucas Biglia	(Argentina)	DM	30 January 1986 (aged 33)	2017	2020	(Italy) Lazio	€17,000,000		56	2
39	Lucas Paquetá	(Brazil)	CM / LW	27 August 1997 (aged 21)	2018	2023	(Brazil) Flamengo	€35,000,000		17	1
79	Franck Kessié	(Ivory Coast)	CM / DM	19 December 1996 (aged 22)	2017	2022	(Italy) Atalanta	Loan		96	12
Forwards
7	Samu Castillejo	(Spain)	RW / LW / SS	18 January 1995 (aged 24)	2018	2023	(Spain) Villarreal	€25,000,000		40	4
8	Suso	(Spain)	RW / SS	19 November 1993 (aged 25)	2015	2022	(England) Liverpool	€1,300,000		136	23
10	Hakan Çalhanoğlu	(Turkey)	LW / CM	8 February 1994 (aged 25)	2017	2021	(Germany) Bayer Leverkusen	€20,000,000		91	12
11	Fabio Borini	(Italy)	LW / RW / SS	29 March 1991 (aged 28)	2018	2021	(England) Sunderland	€5,500,000		73	8
19	Krzysztof Piątek	(Poland)	ST	1 July 1995 (aged 23)	2019	2023	(Italy) Genoa	€35,000,000		21	11
63	Patrick Cutrone	(Italy)	ST / LW	3 January 1998 (aged 21)	2017	2021	(Italy) Milan Primavera	Free	From Youth system	90	27

== Transfers ==
=== Summer window ===
Deals officialised beforehand were effective starting from 1 July 2018.

==== In ====
Date	Pos.	Player	A.	Moving from	Fee	Notes	S.
2 March 2018	DF	(Croatia) Ivan Strinić	30	(Italy) Sampdoria	Free	Transfer announced on 2 July 2018	
16 March 2018	GK	(Spain) Pepe Reina	35	(Italy) Napoli	Free	Transfer announced on 2 July 2018	
7 June 2018	FW	(Italy) Fabio Borini	27	(England) Sunderland	€5,500,000	From loan to definitive purchase	
3 July 2018	MF	(Croatia) Alen Halilović	22	(Germany) Hamburg	Free		
4 July 2018	GK	(Italy) (Belgium) Lillo Guarneri	16	(Belgium) Standard Liège	Undisclosed	Joined Primavera team	
4 July 2018	MF	(Belgium) Alexandro Cavagnera	19	(Belgium) Standard Liège	Undisclosed		
2 August 2018	DF	(Italy) Mattia Caldara	24	(Italy) Juventus	€35,000,000	Paid in two installments	
17 August 2018	DF	(Uruguay) Diego Laxalt	25	(Italy) Genoa	€14,000,000	Plus €4.00M bonuses	
17 August 2018	FW	(Spain) Samu Castillejo	23	(Spain) Villarreal	€25,000,000		

==== On loan ====
Date	Pos.	Player	A.	Moving from	Fee	Notes	S.
2 August 2018	FW	(Argentina) Gonzalo Higuaín	30	(Italy) Juventus	€18,000,000	With option to buy (€36.00M)	
14 August 2018	MF	(France) Tiémoué Bakayoko	23	(England) Chelsea	€5,000,000	With option to buy (€35.00M)	

==== Loan returns ====
Date	Pos.	Player	A.	Moving from	Fee	Notes	S.
30 June 2018	GK	(Italy) Alessandro Plizzari	17	(Italy) Ternana	Free		
30 June 2018	DF	(Czech Republic) Stefan Simić	23	(Italy) Crotone	Free		
30 June 2018	MF	(Italy) Andrea Bertolacci	27	(Italy) Genoa	Free		

Total spending:
▼€102.50M + Undisclosed + Bonuses (€4.00M)

==== Out ====
Date	Pos.	Player	A.	Moving to	Fee	Notes	S.
1 July 2018	GK	(Italy) Marco Storari	41	Unattached	Free	End of contract	
1 July 2018	DF	(Italy) Marco Iudica	20	(Italy) Grumellese	Free	End of contract	
1 July 2018	FW	(Nigeria) Nnamdi Oduamadi	27	(Albania) Tirana	Free	End of contract	
1 July 2018	FW	(Morocco) (Italy) Hachim Mastour	20	(Greece) Lamia	Free	End of contract	
1 July 2018	FW	(Senegal) M'Baye Niang	23	(Italy) Torino	€12,000,000	Obligation to buy	
1 July 2018	FW	(Italy) Gianluca Lapadula	28	(Italy) Genoa	€11,000,000	Obligation to buy	
1 July 2018	FW	(Italy) Gianmarco Zigoni	27	(Italy) Venezia	€450,000	Obligation to buy	
1 July 2018	MF	(Italy) Niccolò Zanellato	20	(Italy) Crotone	€300,000	Obligation to buy	
1 July 2018	FW	(Brazil) Nathan Bernardes	18	Unattached	Free	Released, from Primavera team	
2 August 2018	DF	(Italy) Leonardo Bonucci	31	(Italy) Juventus	€35,000,000	Paid in two installments	
9 August 2018	FW	(Croatia) Nikola Kalinić	30	(Spain) Atlético Madrid	€14,500,000		
9 August 2018	MF	(Italy) Alessio Bianchi	17	(Italy) Lazio	Undisclosed	From Primavera team	
10 August 2018	DF	(Italy) Axel Campeol	18	(Italy) Sampdoria	Undisclosed	From Primavera team	
11 August 2018	DF	(Italy) Luca Antonelli	31	(Italy) Empoli	Free		
17 August 2018	FW	(Colombia) Carlos Bacca	31	(Spain) Villarreal	€7,000,000	After return from loan	
17 August 2018	DF	(Colombia) Jherson Vergara	24	(Italy) Cagliari	Undisclosed		
17 August 2018	GK	(Brazil) Gabriel	25	(Italy) Perugia	Free	After return from loan	
17 August 2018	DF	(Italy) Moris Sportelli	18	(Italy) Torino	Undisclosed	From Primavera team	
22 August 2018	DF	(Italy) Mattia Cornaggia	18	(Italy) OltrepòVoghera	Free	After return from loan	
24 August 2018	MF	(Italy) Matteo Chiarparin	18	(Italy) Ciserano	Undisclosed	From Primavera team	
31 August 2018	MF	(Argentina) Juan Mauri	29	(Italy) Lucchese	Undisclosed		

==== Loans ended ====
Date	Pos.	Player	A.	Moving to	Fee	Notes	S.
30 June 2018	FW	(Norway) Jørgen Strand Larsen	18	(Norway) Sarpsborg	Free	From Primavera team	

==== Loans out ====
Date	Pos.	Player	A.	Moving to	Fee	Notes	S.
31 July 2018	DF	(Italy) Gian Filippo Felicioli	20	(Italy) Perugia	Free	After anticipated return from loan	
3 August 2018	DF	(Paraguay) Gustavo Gomez	25	(Brazil) Palmeiras	€1,500,000	Loan with option to buy (€4.50M)	
10 August 2018	FW	(Italy) Riccardo Forte	19	(Italy) Pistoiese	Free	From Primavera team	
10 August 2018	DF	(Italy) (Spain) Andrés Llamas	20	(Italy) Pistoiese	Free	From Primavera team	
11 August 2018	FW	(Portugal) André Silva	22	(Spain) Sevilla	€4,000,000	Loan with option to buy (€39.00M)	
13 August 2018	MF	(Italy) Manuel Locatelli	20	(Italy) Sassuolo	€2,000,000	Loan with obligation to buy (€10.00M)	
17 August 2018	MF	(Poland) Przemysław Bargiel	18	(Italy) Spezia	Free	From Primavera team	
17 August 2018	DF	(Italy) Gabriele Bellodi	18	(Italy) Olbia	Free	From Primavera team	
17 August 2018	MF	(Croatia) (Italy) Emir Murati	18	(Italy) Torino	Free	From Primavera team, with option to buy	
23 August 2018	MF	(Italy) Tommaso Pobega	19	(Italy) Ternana	Free	From Primavera team	
24 August 2018	GK	(Italy) Alessandro Guarnone	19	(Italy) Matera	Free	From Primavera team	
29 August 2018	FW	(Italy) Antonio Fabozzi	18	(Italy) Fenegrò	Free	After return from loan	
30 August 2018	GK	(Italy) Christian Cavaliere	18	(Italy) Monza	Free	From Primavera team	
31 August 2018	MF	(Belgium) Alexandro Cavagnera	19	(Switzerland) Lugano	Free		
31 August 2018	FW	(Kosovo) (Albania) Ismet Sinani	19	(Italy) Juve Stabia	Free	From Primavera team	
31 August 2018	MF	(Italy) Matteo Gabbia	18	(Italy) Lucchese	Free		
31 August 2018	DF	(Italy) Edoardo Brusa	17	(Italy) Monza	Free	From Primavera team	
31 August 2018	MF	(Morocco) (Italy) Mattia El Hilali	20	(Italy) Matera	Free	From Primavera team	
1 September 2018	FW	(Portugal) Tiago Dias	20	(Portugal) Braga	Free	From Primavera team, with option to buy	

Total income:
▲€87.75M + Undisclosed

=== Winter window ===
Deals officialised beforehand were effective starting from 2 January 2019.

==== In ====
Date	Pos.	Player	A.	Moving from	Fee	Notes	S.
10 October 2018	MF	(Brazil) Lucas Paquetá	21	(Brazil) Flamengo	€35,000,000		
23 January 2019	FW	(Poland) Krzysztof Piątek	23	(Italy) Genoa	€35,000,000		
26 January 2019	DF	(Portugal) Tiago Djaló	18	(Portugal) Sporting CP B	Undisclosed	Joined Primavera team	
28 January 2019	DF	(France) (Cameroon) Leroy Abanda	18	(France) Monaco	Free	Joined Primavera team	
30 January 2019	MF	(Greece) Nikolaos Michelis	17	(Greece) Asteras Tripolis	€400,000	Joined Primavera team	
1 February 2019	MF	(Italy) Giovanni Robotti	16	(Italy) Alessandria	Undisclosed	Joined Allievi Nazionali team	

==== On loan ====
Date	Pos.	Player	A.	Moving from	Fee	Notes	S.
31 January 2019	DF	(Italy) Raoul Bellanova	18	(France) Bordeaux	Undisclosed	Re-joined Primavera team	

Total spending:
▼€70.40M + Undisclosed

==== Out ====
Date	Pos.	Player	A.	Moving to	Fee	Notes	S.
29 January 2019	MF	(Italy) Nicola Torchio	18	(Italy) Brescia	Undisclosed	From Primavera team	
29 January 2019	FW	(Italy) Jacopo Finessi	18	(Italy) Padova	Undisclosed	From Primavera team	
31 January 2019	DF	(Italy) Raoul Bellanova	18	(France) Bordeaux	€1,000,000	From Primavera team	
1 February 2019	MF	(Spain) Sergio Sanchez Gioya	19	(Spain) Leganés	Undisclosed	From Primavera team	
5 February 2019	GK	(Italy) Alessandro Guarnone	19	(Switzerland) Chiasso	Undisclosed	After anticipated return from loan	
15 February 2019	MF	(Italy) (Morocco) Mattia El Hilali	21	(Switzerland) Chiasso	Undisclosed	After anticipated return from loan	

==== Loans out ====
Date	Pos.	Player	A.	Moving to	Fee	Notes	S.
24 January 2019	DF	(Czech Republic) Stefan Simić	24	(Italy) Frosinone	Free		
30 January 2019	FW	(Italy) Vittorio Vigolo	19	(Italy) Verona	Free	From Primavera team	
31 January 2019	MF	(Croatia) Alen Halilović	22	(Belgium) Standard Liège	€600,000	Loan with option to buy	

==== Loans ended ====
Date	Pos.	Player	A.	Moving to	Fee	Notes	S.
23 January 2019	FW	(Argentina) Gonzalo Higuaín	31	(Italy) Juventus	Free	Anticipated end of loan	

Total income:
▲€ 1,60M + Undisclosed

== Pre-season and friendlies ==
=== Friendlies ===
20 July 2018 Friendly	Milan	2–0	Novara	Carnago, Italy
17:00 CEST (UTC+2)	Suso 23'; Calabria 42'	Report		Stadium: Milanello; Referee: Simone Sozza (Italy)

8 September 2018 Friendly	Milan	1–0	Pro Piacenza	Carnago, Italy
11:30 CEST (UTC+2)	Borini 41'	Report		Stadium: Milanello; Referee: (Italy)

22 March 2019 Friendly	Milan	2–0	Chiasso	Carnago, Italy
15:00 CET (UTC+2)	Mauri 22'; Suso 32'	Report		Stadium: Milanello; Referee: (Italy)

=== International Champions Cup ===
25 July 2018 2018 ICC (USA)	Milan	1–1 (8–9 p)	Manchester United	Carson, United States
20:00 PDT (UTC−7); 05:00 CEST (UTC+2)	Suso 15'	Report	Sánchez 12'; Herrera (yellow card) 90+1'	Stadium: StubHub Center; Attendance: 21,742; Referee: Baldomero Toledo (United States)
	Penalties
	Çalhanoğlu (penalty scored); Borini (penalty missed); Kessié (penalty scored); Suso (penalty missed); Reina (penalty scored); Romagnoli (penalty missed); Calabria (penalty scored); Kalinić (penalty scored); Musacchio (penalty scored); Mauri (penalty missed); Antonelli (penalty scored); Çalhanoğlu (penalty scored); Kessié (penalty missed)		(penalty scored) A. Pereira; (penalty scored) Herrera; (penalty scored) Sánchez; (penalty missed) McTominay; (penalty missed) J. Pereira; (penalty missed) Bailly; (penalty scored) Smalling; (penalty scored) Tuanzebe; (penalty scored) Fosu-Mensah; (penalty missed) Hamilton; (penalty scored) Darmian; (penalty scored) A. Pereira; (penalty scored) Herrera

31 July 2018 2018 ICC (USA)	Tottenham Hotspur	1–0	Milan	Minneapolis, United States
19:30 CDT (UTC−5); 02:30 CEST (UTC+2)	Nkoudou 47'; Eyoma (yellow card) 53'	Report	Mauri (yellow card) 81'; Kessié (yellow card) 84'	Stadium: U.S. Bank Stadium; Attendance: 31,264; Referee: Ismail Elfath (United States)

4 August 2018 2018 ICC (USA)	Milan	1–0	Barcelona	Santa Clara, United States
17:00 PDT (UTC−7); 02:00 CEST (UTC+2)	Çalhanoğlu (yellow card) 57'; Kessié (yellow card) 66'; Mauri (yellow card) 72'; A. Silva 90+3'	Report	Lenglet (yellow card) 49'	Stadium: Levi's Stadium; Attendance: 51,391; Referee: Baldomero Toledo (United States)

=== Trofeo Santiago Bernabéu ===
11 August 2018	Real Madrid	3–1	Milan	Madrid, Spain
21:00 CEST (UTC+2)	Benzema 2'; Bale 45+1'; Mayoral 90+1'	Report	Higuaín 4'	Stadium: Santiago Bernabéu; Referee: Javier Estrada Fernández

== Competitions ==
=== Supercoppa Italiana ===
16 January 2019	Juventus	1–0	Milan	Jeddah, Saudi Arabia
20:30 AST (UTC+03:00); 18:30 CET (UTC+01:00)	Alex Sandro (yellow card) 26'; Pjanić (yellow card) 44'; Ronaldo 61'; Dybala (yellow card) 90+4'	Report	Çalhanoğlu (yellow card) 21'; Castillejo (yellow card) 45+2'; Kessié (red card) 74'; Romagnoli (yellow card) 74'; Calabria (yellow card) 82'; Rodriguez (yellow card) 87'	Stadium: King Abdullah Sports City; Attendance: 61,235; Referee: Luca Banti

=== Serie A ===
==== League table ====
Pos	Team	Pld	W	D	L	GF	GA	GD	Pts	Qualification or relegation
3	Atalanta	38	20	9	9	77	46	+31	69 (Note: Atalanta finished ahead of Internazionale on head-to-head points: Atalanta 4–1 Internazionale, Internazionale 0–0 Atalanta.)	Qualification for the Champions League group stage
4	Inter Milan	38	20	9	9	57	33	+24	69	Qualification for the Champions League group stage
5	Milan (Note: Milan were excluded from UEFA competitions over financial fair play violation.)	38	19	11	8	55	36	+19	68	
6	Roma	38	18	12	8	66	48	+18	66	Qualification for the Europa League group stage
7	Torino	38	16	15	7	52	37	+15	63	Qualification for the Europa League second qualifying round

Source: Serie A, Soccerway
Rules for classification: 1) Points; 2) Head-to-head points; 3) Head-to-head goal difference; 4) Goal difference; 5) Goals scored; 6) Draw. (Note: Head-to-head record is used only after all the matches between the teams in question have been played).

==== Results summary ====
Overall								Home						Away					
Pld	W	D	L	GF	GA	GD	Pts	W	D	L	GF	GA	GD	W	D	L	GF	GA	GD
38	19	11	8	55	36	+19	68	12	4	3	31	17	+14	7	7	5	24	19	+5

Last updated: 26 May 2019.
Source: Competitive matches

==== Results by round ====
Round	1	2	3	4	5	6	7	8	9	10	11	12	13	14	15	16	17	18	19	20	21	22	23	24	25	26	27	28	29	30	31	32	33	34	35	36	37	38
Ground	H	A	H	A	H	A	A	H	A	H	A	H	A	H	H	A	H	A	H	A	H	A	H	A	H	H	A	H	A	H	A	H	A	A	H	A	H	A
Result	W	L	W	D	D	D	W	W	L	W	W	L	D	W	D	D	L	D	W	W	D	D	W	W	W	W	W	L	L	D	L	W	D	L	W	W	W	W
Position	4	17	14	14	12	13	11	10	12	5	4	5	5	4	4	4	5	6	5	4	4	4	4	4	4	3	3	4	4	4	4	4	4	7	5	5	5	5

Updated to match(es) played on 26 May 2019. Source: Competitive matches
A = Away; H = Home; W = Win; D = Draw; L = Loss; P = Postponed

==== Matches ====
25 August 2018 2	Napoli	3–2	Milan	Naples
20:30 CEST (UTC+02:00)	Insigne (yellow card) 30'; Zieliński 53', 67'; Mertens 80'; Koulibaly (yellow card) 90+2'	Report	Bonaventura 15'; Suso (yellow card) 31'; Calabria 49'; Rodriguez (yellow card) 66'	Stadium: Stadio San Paolo; Attendance: 34,474; Referee: Paolo Valeri

31 August 2018 3	Milan	2–1	Roma	Milan
20:30 CEST (UTC+02:00)	Kessié 40'; Cutrone 90+5'	Report	Fazio 59'; Cristante (yellow card) 77'; De Rossi (yellow card) 88'	Stadium: San Siro; Attendance: 57,789; Referee: Marco Guida

16 September 2018 4	Cagliari	1–1	Milan	Cagliari
20:30 CEST (UTC+02:00)	João Pedro 4'; Srna (yellow card) 71'	Report	Higuaín 55'; Kessié (yellow card) 90+1'	Stadium: Sardegna Arena; Attendance: 16,201; Referee: Rosario Abisso

23 September 2018 5	Milan	2–2	Atalanta	Milan
18:00 CEST (UTC+02:00)	Higuaín 2', (yellow card) 65'; Calabria (yellow card) 51'; Bonaventura 61'	Report	Gómez 54', (yellow card) 78'; Rigoni 90+1'	Stadium: San Siro; Attendance: 51,684; Referee: Daniele Doveri

27 September 2018 6	Empoli	1–1	Milan	Empoli
21:00 CEST (UTC+02:00)	Maietta (yellow card) 53'; Capezzi (yellow card) 55'; Caputo 71' (pen.)	Report	Capezzi 10' (o.g.); Calabria (yellow card) 45+1'; Laxalt (yellow card) 84'	Stadium: Stadio Carlo Castellani; Attendance: 13,890; Referee: Michael Fabbri

30 September 2018 7	Sassuolo	1–4	Milan	Reggio Emilia
20:30 CEST (UTC+02:00)	Đuričić 68'; Rogério (yellow card) 70'	Report	Biglia (yellow card) 17'; Kessié 39'; Suso 50', 90+4'; Castillejo 60'	Stadium: Mapei Stadium – Città del Tricolore; Attendance: 16,795; Referee: Piero Giacomelli

7 October 2018 8	Milan	3–1	Chievo	Milan
15:00 CEST (UTC+02:00)	Higuaín 27', 34', (yellow card) 69'; Bonaventura 56'	Report	Barba (yellow card) 62'; Pellissier 63'	Stadium: San Siro; Attendance: 48,088; Referee: Gianpaolo Calvarese

21 October 2018 9	Internazionale	1–0	Milan	Milan
20:30 CEST (UTC+02:00)	Politano (yellow card) 75'; Icardi 90+2'; Keita (yellow card) 90+5'	Report	Biglia (yellow card) 20'; Çalhanoğlu (yellow card) 44'; Calabria (yellow card) 45+2'; Suso (yellow card) 61'; Bakayoko (yellow card) 90+1'	Stadium: San Siro; Attendance: 78,725; Referee: Marco Guida

28 October 2018 10	Milan	3–2	Sampdoria	Milan
18:00 CET (UTC+01:00)	Cutrone 17'; Higuaín 36'; Suso 62'; Abate (yellow card) 80'; Kessié (yellow card) 82'; Romagnoli (yellow card) 90+3'	Report	Saponara 21'; Linetty (yellow card) 24'; Quagliarella 31'; Sala (yellow card) 60'	Stadium: San Siro; Attendance: 47,347; Referee: Fabio Maresca

31 October 2018 1	Milan	2–1	Genoa	Milan
20:30 CET (UTC+01:00)	Suso 4'; Kessié (yellow card) 50'; Rodriguez (yellow card) 83'; Romagnoli 90+1'	Report	Criscito (yellow card) 43'; Romagnoli 56' (o.g.); Veloso (yellow card) 80'	Stadium: San Siro; Attendance: 46,720; Referee: Fabrizio Pasqua
Note: Match was postponed from its original date of 19 August due to the collapse of the Ponte Morandi bridge in Genoa, which resulted in the deaths of 43 people.

4 November 2018 11	Udinese	0–1	Milan	Udine
20:30 CET (UTC+01:00)	Samir (yellow card) 28'; Troost Ekong (yellow card) 64'; Pussetto (yellow card) 71'; Nuytinck (red card) 90+5'	Report	Kessié (yellow card) 48'; Zapata (yellow card) 68'; Romagnoli 90+7', (yellow card) 90+8'	Stadium: Dacia Arena; Attendance: 23,540; Referee: Marco Di Bello

11 November 2018 12	Milan	0–2	Juventus	Milan
20:30 CET (UTC+01:00)	Bakayoko (yellow card) 61'; Higuaín (yellow card) 83', (red card) 83'; Borini (yellow card) 87'	Report	Mandžukić 8'; Benatia (yellow card) 34'; Ronaldo 81'	Stadium: San Siro; Attendance: 74,729; Referee: Paolo Mazzoleni

25 November 2018 13	Lazio	1–1	Milan	Rome
18:00 CET (UTC+01:00)	Milinković-Savić (yellow card) 33'; Correa 90+4'	Report	Wallace 78' (o.g.); G. Donnarumma (yellow card) 87'	Stadium: Stadio Olimpico; Attendance: 38,269; Referee: Luca Banti

2 December 2018 14	Milan	2–1	Parma	Milan
12:30 CET (UTC+01:00)	Cutrone 55'; Borini (yellow card) 70'; Kessié 71' (pen.); Castillejo (yellow card) 90+6'	Report	Inglese 49'; Biabiany (yellow card) 61'; Iacoponi (yellow card) 72'	Stadium: San Siro; Attendance: 53,275; Referee: Gianpaolo Calvarese

9 December 2018 15	Milan	0–0	Torino	Milan
20:30 CET (UTC+01:00)	Abate (yellow card) 8'; Zapata (yellow card) 39'	Report	Nkoulou (yellow card) 16'; Izzo (yellow card) 35'; Baselli (yellow card) 70'	Stadium: San Siro; Attendance: 44,572; Referee: Daniele Orsato

18 December 2018 16	Bologna	0–0	Milan	Bologna
20:30 CET (UTC+01:00)	Santander (yellow card) 42'; Helander (yellow card) 84'	Report	Calabria (yellow card) 40'; Bakayoko (yellow card) 73' (yellow-red card) 76'; Kessié (yellow card) 83'; Romagnoli (yellow card) 90+4'	Stadium: Stadio Renato Dall'Ara; Attendance: 22,214; Referee: Fabio Maresca

22 December 2018 17	Milan	0–1	Fiorentina	Milan
15:00 CET (UTC+01:00)	Suso (yellow card) 77'; Romagnoli (yellow card) 78'; Laxalt (yellow card) 90+3'	Report	Pezzella (yellow card) 32'; Hugo (yellow card) 42'; Fernandes (yellow card) 62'; Chiesa 73', (yellow card) 74'	Stadium: San Siro; Attendance: 52,592; Referee: Maurizio Mariani

26 December 2018 18	Frosinone	0–0	Milan	Frosinone
12:30 CET (UTC+01:00)	Ghiglione (yellow card) 41'; Crisetig (yellow card) 54'	Report	G. Donnarumma (yellow card) 40'	Stadium: Stadio Benito Stirpe; Attendance: 15,217; Referee: Marco Guida

29 December 2018 19	Milan	2–1	SPAL	Milan
20:30 CET (UTC+01:00)	Castillejo 16', (yellow card) 56'; Higuaín 64'; Zapata (yellow card) 73'; Suso (yellow card) 79' (yellow-red card) 89'	Report	Petagna 13'; Kurtić (yellow card) 51'; Schiattarella (yellow card) 70'	Stadium: San Siro; Attendance: 48,070; Referee: Rosario Abisso

21 January 2019 20	Genoa	0–2	Milan	Genoa
15:00 CET (UTC+01:00)	Romero (yellow card) 41'; Rolón (yellow card) 70'; Zukanović (yellow card) 77'	Report	Borini (yellow card) 8', (goal) 72'; Cutrone (yellow card) 45+1'; Paquetá (yellow card) 58'; Suso 83'	Stadium: Stadio Luigi Ferraris; Attendance: 19,794; Referee: Daniele Orsato

26 January 2019 21	Milan	0–0	Napoli	Milan
20:30 CET (UTC+01:00)	Cutrone (yellow card) 17'	Report	Fabián (yellow card) 18' (yellow-red card) 90+3'; Albiol (yellow card) 86'	Stadium: San Siro; Attendance: 56,729; Referee: Daniele Doveri

3 February 2019 22	Roma	1–1	Milan	Rome
20:30 CET (UTC+01:00)	Manolas (yellow card) 18'; Zaniolo (yellow card) 21', (goal) 46'; Lo. Pellegrini (yellow card) 63'; Kolarov (yellow card) 90+3'	Report	Piątek 26'; Suso (yellow card) 40'; Paquetá (yellow card) 53'; Kessié (yellow card) 72'	Stadium: Stadio Olimpico; Attendance: 37,581; Referee: Fabio Maresca

10 February 2019 23	Milan	3–0	Cagliari	Milan
20:30 CET (UTC+01:00)	Ceppitelli 13' (o.g.); Paquetá 22'; Piątek 62'	Report	Faragò (yellow card) 75'	Stadium: San Siro; Attendance: 45,576; Referee: Federico La Penna

16 February 2019 24	Atalanta	1–3	Milan	Bergamo
20:30 CET (UTC+01:00)	De Roon (yellow card) 18'; Freuler 33'	Report	Suso (yellow card) 27'; Piątek 45+1', 61'; Çalhanoğlu 55'; Rodriguez (yellow card) 89'	Stadium: Stadio Atleti Azzurri d'Italia; Attendance: 20,801; Referee: Fabrizio Pasqua

22 February 2019 25	Milan	3–0	Empoli	Milan
20:30 CET (UTC+01:00)	Piątek 49'; Kessié 51'; Castillejo 67'; Çalhanoğlu (yellow card) 71'	Report	Di Lorenzo (yellow card) 55'	Stadium: San Siro; Attendance: 47,866; Referee: Piero Giacomelli

2 March 2019 26	Milan	1–0	Sassuolo	Milan
18:00 CET (UTC+01:00)	Lirola 35' (o.g.); Bakayoko (yellow card) 37'; Paquetá (yellow card) 51'; Rodriguez (yellow card) 90+2'	Report	Consigli (red card) 64'	Stadium: San Siro; Attendance: 61,462; Referee: Paolo Valeri

9 March 2019 27	Chievo	1–2	Milan	Verona
20:30 CET (UTC+01:00)	Hetemaj 41', (yellow card) 90+5'; Giaccherini (yellow card) 60'; Sorrentino (yellow card) 71'	Report	Biglia 31'; Conti (yellow card) 52'; Piątek 57'	Stadium: Stadio Marc'Antonio Bentegodi; Attendance: 26,500; Referee: Luca Pairetto

17 March 2019 28	Milan	2–3	Internazionale	Milan
20:30 CET (UTC+01:00)	Rodriguez (yellow card) 32'; Bakayoko 57'; Romagnoli (yellow card) 66'; Musacchio 71'; Suso (yellow card) 80'; Conti (yellow card) 89'	Report	Vecino 3', (yellow card) 79'; Brozović (yellow card) 14'; De Vrij 51'; Martínez 67' (pen.); Gagliardini (yellow card) 90+3'	Stadium: San Siro; Attendance: 77,749; Referee: Marco Guida

30 March 2019 29	Sampdoria	1–0	Milan	Genoa
20:30 CET (UTC+01:00)	Defrel 1'; Vieira (yellow card) 37'; Praet (yellow card) 86'	Report	Suso (yellow card) 15'; Castillejo (yellow card) 25'; Bakayoko (yellow card) 65'; Musacchio (yellow card) 90+1'	Stadium: Stadio Luigi Ferraris; Attendance: 23,475; Referee: Daniele Orsato

2 April 2019 30	Milan	1–1	Udinese	Milan
19:00 CEST (UTC+02:00)	Piątek 44'	Report	Lasagna 65'	Stadium: San Siro; Attendance: 49,665; Referee: Luca Banti

6 April 2019 31	Juventus	2–1	Milan	Turin
18:00 CEST (UTC+02:00)	Bernardeschi (yellow card) 41'; Dybala 60' (pen.); Kean 84'; Mandžukić (yellow card) 86'	Report	Piątek 39'; Musacchio (yellow card) 59'; Çalhanoğlu (yellow card) 77'	Stadium: Allianz Stadium; Attendance: 40,057; Referee: Michael Fabbri

13 April 2019 32	Milan	1–0	Lazio	Milan
20:30 CEST (UTC+02:00)	Kessié 79' (pen.); Zapata (yellow card) 90+5'	Report	Rômulo (yellow card) 9'; Luis Alberto (yellow card) 85'	Stadium: San Siro; Attendance: 61,216; Referee: Gianluca Rocchi

20 April 2019 33	Parma	1–1	Milan	Parma
12:30 CEST (UTC+02:00)	Alves 87'	Report	Castillejo 69'; Biglia (yellow card) 83'	Stadium: Stadio Ennio Tardini; Attendance: 20,018; Referee: Paolo Valeri

28 April 2019 34	Torino	2–0	Milan	Turin
20:30 CEST (UTC+02:00)	Belotti 58' (pen.); Moretti (yellow card) 65'; Berenguer 69'; Parigini (yellow card) 83'	Report	Suso (yellow card) 8'; Conti (yellow card) 13'; Paquetá (yellow card) 16'; Romagnoli (yellow card) 77', (red card) 82'; G. Donnarumma (yellow card) 81'; Kessié (yellow card) 83'	Stadium: Stadio Olimpico Grande Torino; Attendance: 26,476; Referee: Marco Guida

6 May 2019 35	Milan	2–1	Bologna	Milan
20:30 CEST (UTC+02:00)	Suso 37'; Borini 67'; Paquetá (yellow card) 74', (red card) 75'; Kessié (yellow card) 90+6'	Report	Poli (yellow card) 44'; Sansone (yellow card) 57' (yellow-red card) 90+6'; Calabresi (yellow card) 65'; Destro 72'; Pulgar (yellow card) 75'; Dijks (red card) 90+7'	Stadium: San Siro; Attendance: 51,472; Referee: Marco Di Bello

11 May 2019 36	Fiorentina	0–1	Milan	Florence
20:30 CEST (UTC+02:00)	Biraghi (yellow card) 34'; Laurini (yellow card) 67'	Report	Çalhanoğlu 36'; G. Donnarumma (yellow card) 79'	Stadium: Stadio Artemio Franchi; Attendance: 33,250; Referee: Maurizio Mariani

19 May 2019 37	Milan	2–0	Frosinone	Milan
18:00 CEST (UTC+02:00)	Abate (yellow card) 49'; Piątek 57'; Suso 66'	Report		Stadium: San Siro; Attendance: 61,765; Referee: Gianluca Manganiello

26 May 2019 38	SPAL	2–3	Milan	Ferrara
20:30 CEST (UTC+02:00)	Vicari 28'; Bonifazi (yellow card) 36'; Fares 53'; Cionek (yellow card) 65'	Report	Çalhanoğlu 18'; Kessié 23', 66' (pen.); Abate (yellow card) 27'; Bakayoko (yellow card) 81'	Stadium: Stadio Paolo Mazza; Attendance: 16,134; Referee: Paolo Valeri

=== Coppa Italia ===
12 January 2019 Round of 16	Sampdoria	0–2 (a.e.t.)	Milan	Genoa
18:00 CET (UTC+01:00)	Ramírez (yellow card) 24'; Praet (yellow card) 68'	Report	Rodriguez (yellow card) 32'; Kessié (yellow card) 57'; Cutrone 102', 108'	Stadium: Stadio Luigi Ferraris; Attendance: 14,854; Referee: Fabrizio Pasqua

29 January 2019 Quarter-finals	Milan	2–0	Napoli	Milan
20:45 CET (UTC+01:00)	Piątek 11', 27'	Report	Malcuit (yellow card) 29'; Milik (yellow card) 35'; Koulibaly (yellow card) 40'	Stadium: San Siro; Attendance: 22,289; Referee: Piero Giacomelli

26 February 2019 Semi-finals 1st leg	Lazio	0–0	Milan	Rome
21:00 CET (UTC+01:00)	Parolo (yellow card) 35'; Patric (yellow card) 78'	Report	Romagnoli (yellow card) 44'; Calabria (yellow card) 78'; G. Donnarumma (yellow card) 80'	Stadium: Stadio Olimpico; Attendance: 31,235; Referee: Daniele Orsato

24 April 2019 Semi-finals 2nd leg	Milan	0–1 (0–1 agg.)	Lazio	Milan
20:45 CEST (UTC+02:00)	Musacchio (yellow card) 70'; Bakayoko (yellow card) 79'	Report	Luiz Felipe (yellow card) 37'; Correa 58'; Caicedo (yellow card) 78'	Stadium: San Siro; Attendance: 61,045; Referee: Paolo Mazzoleni

=== UEFA Europa League ===
==== Group stage ====
Pos	Team	Pld	W	D	L	GF	GA	GD	Pts	Qualification	BET	OLY	MIL	DUD
1	(Spain) Real Betis	6	3	3	0	7	2	+5	12	Advance to knockout phase	—	1–0	1–1	3–0
2	(Greece) Olympiacos	6	3	1	2	11	6	+5	10 (Note: Goal difference in all group matches: Olympiacos +5, Milan +3.)	Advance to knockout phase	0–0	—	3–1	5–1
3	(Italy) Milan	6	3	1	2	12	9	+3	10		1–2	3–1	—	5–2
4	(Luxembourg) F91 Dudelange	6	0	1	5	3	16	−13	1		0–0	0–2	0–1	—

Source: UEFA
Rules for classification: Group stage tiebreakers
Notes:

20 September 2018 1	F91 Dudelange (Luxembourg)	0–1	(Italy) Milan	Luxembourg City, Luxembourg
21:00 CEST (UTC+02:00)	Prempeh (yellow card) 56'; Malget (yellow card) 58'	Report	Abate (yellow card) 11'; Romagnoli (yellow card) 39'; Higuaín 59'	Stadium: Stade Josy Barthel; Attendance: 7,983; Referee: Srđan Jovanović (Serbia)

4 October 2018 2	Milan (Italy)	3–1	(Greece) Olympiacos	Milan, Italy
18:55 CEST (UTC+02:00)	Çalhanoğlu (yellow card) 56'; Cutrone 70', 79'; Higuaín 76'	Report	Guerrero 14'	Stadium: San Siro; Attendance: 22,294; Referee: Bobby Madden (Scotland)

25 October 2018 3	Milan (Italy)	1–2	(Spain) Real Betis	Milan, Italy
18:55 CEST (UTC+02:00)	Romagnoli (yellow card) 31'; Higuaín (yellow card) 45+1'; Cutrone 83'; Castillejo (red card) 90+4'	Report	Sanabria 30'; Canales (yellow card) 45+2'; Lo Celso 55', (yellow card) 80'; López (yellow card) 86'	Stadium: San Siro; Attendance: 22,405; Referee: Bas Nijhuis (Netherlands)

8 November 2018 4	Real Betis (Spain)	1–1	(Italy) Milan	Seville, Spain
21:00 CET (UTC+01:00)	Lo Celso 12', (yellow card) 61'; Feddal (yellow card) 45'	Report	Suso 62'; Rodriguez (yellow card) 73'; Musacchio (yellow card) 78'; Bakayoko (yellow card) 88'; Bertolacci (yellow card) 90+4'	Stadium: Benito Villamarín; Attendance: 45,647; Referee: Craig Pawson (England)

29 November 2018 5	Milan (Italy)	5–2	(Luxembourg) F91 Dudelange	Milan, Italy
18:55 CET (UTC+01:00)	Cutrone 21'; Zapata (yellow card) 59'; Stélvio 66' (o.g.); Çalhanoğlu 70'; Schnell 78' (o.g.); Borini 81'	Report	Stolz (yellow card) 19', (goal) 39'; Turpel 49', (yellow card) 72'; Mélisse (yellow card) 87'	Stadium: San Siro; Attendance: 15,521; Referee: Vladislav Bezborodov (Russia)

13 December 2018 6	Olympiacos (Greece)	3–1	(Italy) Milan	Piraeus, Greece
21:00 CET (UTC+01:00)	Koutris (yellow card) 41'; Cissé (yellow card) 44', (goal) 60'; Zapata 70' (o.g.); Camara (yellow card) 73'; Fortounis 81' (pen.); Guerrero (yellow card) 90'	Report	Çalhanoğlu (yellow card) 13'; Bakayoko (yellow card) 43'; Reina (yellow card) 53'; Zapata 72'; Abate (yellow card) 80'	Stadium: Karaiskakis Stadium; Attendance: 31,010; Referee: Benoît Bastien (France)

== Statistics ==
=== Appearances and goals ===
No.	Pos	Nat	Player	Total		Serie A		Supercoppa Italiana		Coppa Italia		Europa League	
No.	Pos	Nat	Player	Apps	Goals	Apps	Goals	Apps	Goals	Apps	Goals	Apps	Goals
Goalkeepers
25	GK	(Spain) ESP	Pepe Reina	12	0	2+2	0	0	0	2	0	6	0
35	GK	(Italy) ITA	Alessandro Plizzari	0	0	0	0	0	0	0	0	0	0
90	GK	(Italy) ITA	Antonio Donnarumma	0	0	0	0	0	0	0	0	0	0
99	GK	(Italy) ITA	Gianluigi Donnarumma	39	0	36	0	1	0	2	0	0	0
Defenders
2	DF	(Italy) ITA	Davide Calabria	33	1	22+4	1	1	0	2	0	4	0
12	DF	(Italy) ITA	Andrea Conti	15	0	4+8	0	0+1	0	0+2	0	0	0
13	DF	(Italy) ITA	Alessio Romagnoli	41	2	32	2	1	0	4	0	3+1	0
17	DF	(Colombia) COL	Cristián Zapata	20	1	12+1	0	1	0	1	0	5	1
20	DF	(Italy) ITA	Ignazio Abate	24	0	15+4	0	0	0	2	0	2+1	0
22	DF	(Argentina) ARG	Mateo Musacchio	33	1	29	1	0	0	3	0	1	0
23	DF	(Croatia) CRO	Ivan Strinić	0	0	0	0	0	0	0	0	0	0
33	DF	(Italy) ITA	Mattia Caldara	2	0	0	0	0	0	1	0	1	0
68	DF	(Switzerland) SUI	Ricardo Rodríguez	41	1	35	1	1	0	1+1	0	3	0
93	DF	(Uruguay) URU	Diego Laxalt	29	0	6+14	0	0	0	3+1	0	5	0
Midfielders
4	MF	(Italy) ITA	José Mauri	7	0	2+3	0	0	0	0	0	1+1	0
5	MF	(Italy) ITA	Giacomo Bonaventura	10	3	8	3	0	0	0	0	2	0
14	MF	(France) FRA	Tiémoué Bakayoko	42	1	26+5	1	1	0	4	0	6	0
16	MF	(Italy) ITA	Andrea Bertolacci	4	0	0	0	0	0	0	0	2+2	0
18	MF	(Italy) ITA	Riccardo Montolivo	0	0	0	0	0	0	0	0	0	0
21	MF	(Argentina) ARG	Lucas Biglia	19	1	13+3	1	0	0	0+1	0	2	0
39	MF	(Brazil) BRA	Lucas Paquetá	17	1	12+1	1	1	0	3	0	0	0
79	MF	(Ivory Coast) CIV	Franck Kessié	42	7	34	7	1	0	4	0	2+1	0
Forwards
7	FW	(Spain) ESP	Samu Castillejo	39	4	8+23	4	1	0	2+1	0	4	0
8	FW	(Spain) ESP	Suso	42	8	35	7	0	0	3	0	2+2	1
10	FW	(Turkey) TUR	Hakan Çalhanoğlu	46	4	34+2	3	1	0	1+3	0	3+2	1
11	FW	(Italy) ITA	Fabio Borini	29	3	10+10	2	0+1	0	2+1	0	3+2	1
19	FW	(Poland) POL	Krzysztof Piątek	21	11	16+2	9	0	0	3	2	0	0
63	FW	(Italy) ITA	Patrick Cutrone	43	9	13+21	3	1	0	0+3	2	3+2	4
Other
NN			Own goals	0	6	0	4	0	0	0	0	0	2
Players transferred out during the season
9	FW	(Argentina) ARG	Gonzalo Higuaín	22	8	15	6	0+1	0	1	0	5	2
56	DF	(Czech Republic) CZE	Stefan Simić	1	0	0	0	0	0	0	0	1	0
77	FW	(Croatia) CRO	Alen Halilović	3	0	0	0	0	0	0	0	1+2	0

Source: Competitions

=== Goalscorers ===
Rank	No.	Pos	Nat	Name	Serie A	Supercoppa	Coppa Italia	UEFA EL	Total
1	19	FW	(Poland)	Krzysztof Piątek	9	0	2	0	11
2	63	FW	(Italy)	Patrick Cutrone	3	0	2	4	9
3	9	FW	(Argentina)	Gonzalo Higuaín	6	0	0	2	8
3	8	FW	(Spain)	Suso	7	0	0	1	8
5	79	MF	(Ivory Coast)	Franck Kessié	7	0	0	0	7
6	7	FW	(Spain)	Samu Castillejo	4	0	0	0	4
6	10	FW	(Turkey)	Hakan Çalhanoğlu	3	0	0	1	4
8	5	MF	(Italy)	Giacomo Bonaventura	3	0	0	0	3
8	11	FW	(Italy)	Fabio Borini	2	0	0	1	3
10	13	DF	(Italy)	Alessio Romagnoli	2	0	0	0	2
11	2	DF	(Italy)	Davide Calabria	1	0	0	0	1
11	17	DF	(Colombia)	Cristián Zapata	0	0	0	1	1
11	21	MF	(Argentina)	Lucas Biglia	1	0	0	0	1
11	39	MF	(Brazil)	Lucas Paquetá	1	0	0	0	1
11	14	MF	(France)	Tiémoué Bakayoko	1	0	0	0	1
11	14	MF	(Argentina)	Mateo Musacchio	1	0	0	0	1
Own goal					4	0	0	2	6
Totals					55	0	4	12	71

Players in italics left the team during the season.

=== Assist ===
Rank	No.	Pos	Nat	Name	Serie A	Supercoppa	Coppa Italia	UEFA EL	Total
1	10	FW	(Turkey)	Hakan Çalhanoğlu	6	0	1	3	10
1	8	FW	(Spain)	Suso	10	0	0	0	10
3	68	DF	(Switzerland)	Ricardo Rodríguez	3	0	0	1	4
3	7	FW	(Spain)	Samu Castillejo	2	0	0	2	4
5	12	DF	(Italy)	Andrea Conti	2	0	1	0	3
6	9	FW	(Argentina)	Gonzalo Higuaín	1	0	0	1	2
6	63	FW	(Italy)	Patrick Cutrone	2	0	0	0	2
6	39	MF	(Brazil)	Lucas Paquetá	1	0	1	0	2
6	79	MF	(Ivory Coast)	Franck Kessié	2	0	0	0	2
6	11	FW	(Italy)	Fabio Borini	2	0	0	0	2
11	93	DF	(Uruguay)	Diego Laxalt	0	0	1	0	1
11	2	DF	(Italy)	Davide Calabria	1	0	0	0	1
11	14	MF	(France)	Tiémoué Bakayoko	1	0	0	0	1
Totals					33	0	4	7	44

Players in italics left the team during the season.

=== Clean sheets ===
Rank	No.	Pos	Nat	Name	Serie A	Supercoppa	Coppa Italia	UEFA EL	Total
1	99	GK	(Italy)	Gianluigi Donnarumma	12	0	2	0	14
2	25	GK	(Spain)	Pepe Reina	1	0	1	1	3
Totals					13	0	3	1	17

=== Disciplinary record ===
No.	Pos	Nat	Name	Serie A			Supercoppa			Coppa Italia			UEFA EL			Total		
No.	Pos	Nat	Name	Booked	(yellow card) (yellow-red card)	Sent off (straight red)	Booked	(yellow card) (yellow-red card)	Sent off (straight red)	Booked	(yellow card) (yellow-red card)	Sent off (straight red)	Booked	(yellow card) (yellow-red card)	Sent off (straight red)	Booked	(yellow card) (yellow-red card)	Sent off (straight red)
13	DF	(Italy)	Alessio Romagnoli	6		1	1			1			2			10		1
79	MF	(Ivory Coast)	Franck Kessié	8					1	1						9		1
8	FW	(Spain)	Suso	9	1											9	1	
14	MF	(France)	Tiémoué Bakayoko	6	1					1			2			9	1	
68	DF	(Switzerland)	Ricardo Rodríguez	5			1			1			1			8		
2	DF	(Italy)	Davide Calabria	5			1			1						7		
10	FW	(Turkey)	Hakan Çalhanoğlu	3			1						2			6		
20	DF	(Italy)	Ignazio Abate	4									2			6		
39	MF	(Brazil)	Lucas Paquetá	5		1										5		1
17	DF	(Colombia)	Cristián Zapata	4									1			5		
7	FW	(Spain)	Samu Castillejo	3			1								1	4		1
22	DF	(Argentina)	Mateo Musacchio	2						1			1			4		
99	GK	(Italy)	Gianluigi Donnarumma	4						1						4		
9	FW	(Argentina)	Gonzalo Higuaín	3		1							1			4		1
11	FW	(Italy)	Fabio Borini	3												3		
21	MF	(Argentina)	Lucas Biglia	3												3		
12	DF	(Italy)	Andrea Conti	3												3		
93	DF	(Uruguay)	Diego Laxalt	2												2		
63	FW	(Italy)	Patrick Cutrone	2												2		
16	MF	(Italy)	Andrea Bertolacci										1			1		
25	GK	(Spain)	Pepe Reina										1			1		
56	DF	(Czech Republic)	Stefan Šimić										1			1		
Totals				52	2	1	5		1	2			15		1	74	2	3

Players in italics left the team during the season.
