= Cristián Zapata =

Colombian footballer (born 1986)

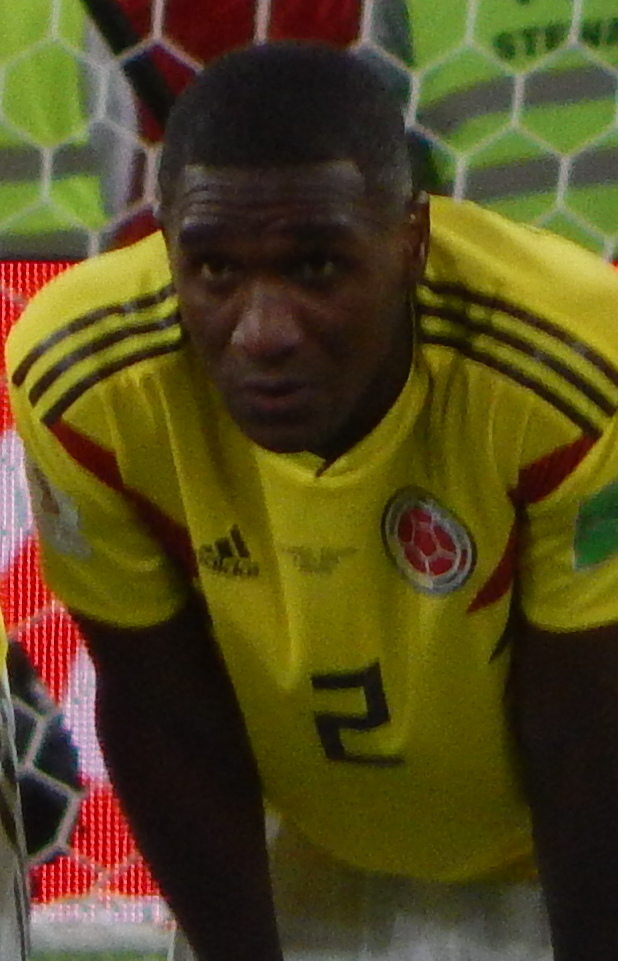
- Zapata with Colombia at the 2018 FIFA World Cup

Personal information
- Full name: Cristián Eduardo Zapata Valencia
- Date of birth: 30 September 1986 (age 40)
- Place of birth: Padilla, Colombia
- Height: 1.87 m (6 ft 2 in)
- Position: Centre-back

Youth career
- Deportivo Cali

Senior career*
Years	Team	Apps	(Gls)
2004–2005	Deportivo Cali	17	(0)
2005–2011	Udinese	168	(5)
2011–2013	Villarreal	28	(0)
2012–2013	→ AC Milan (loan)	23	(0)
2013–2019	AC Milan	88	(3)
2019–2021	Genoa	32	(1)
2021–2022	San Lorenzo	50	(2)
2023	Atlético Nacional	38	(0)
2024	Vitória	2	(0)
2024–2025	Atlético Bucaramanga	15	(1)

International career
2007–2019	Colombia	58	(2)
Medal record
Representing Colombia
Copa América
Bronze medal – third place	2016
South American Youth Football Championship
Winner	2005
- * Club domestic league appearances and goals as of 5 August 2024

Cristián Eduardo Zapata Valencia (born 30 September 1986) is a Colombian former professional footballer who played as a centre-back. A quick and physically powerful defender, known for his hard marking of opponents and strength in the air, he usually played as a centre back. Although naturally right footed, he can also play as a full-back on either side of the pitch, as he is comfortable with both feet.

Zapata began his career in Colombia with Deportivo Cali in 2004, moving to Serie A club Udinese the following year. After spending several seasons with Udinese, Zapata signed for Spanish club Villarreal. In 2012, he returned to Italy, joining AC Milan. Following the expiration of his contract with the Rossoneri, he joined Italian top-flight counterpart Genoa in 2019, departing in 2021 to join Argentine Primera División side San Lorenzo.

A Colombian international since 2008, he has represented his nation at the 2011, 2015, 2016, and 2019 editions of the Copa América, as well at the 2014 and 2018 FIFA World Cups.

== Club career ==
=== Early career and Udinese ===
A product of Deportivo Cali's youth academy, Zapata was quickly promoted to the first team in 2004. In his first season, Zapata played a total of 25 games with Los Azucareros while also consolidating himself as a key component of the team's defensive end. After exhibiting quality defensive assets in his debut season, several European teams were interested in acquiring him. Ultimately, his destiny laid in Udine and eventually joined Serie A club Udinese. Also, this leap to European football was one month before his 19th birthday and ultimately consisted of a €550,000 transfer fee.

Zapata was signed by Udinese on 31 August 2005 from Deportivo Cali, along with team-mate Abel Aguilar. Both of them were scouted by Udinese while playing at the U-20 World Cup. He made his first appearance with the squad on 19 November 2005 against Messina Pelero for the Serie A. On 18 September 2006, Zapata signed a new five-year contract. That season he started 35 Serie A games. Cristián Zapata employed Claudio Pasqualin (of P.D.P. srl) as his agent on 21 February 2006, but fired him on 9 July 2007. In 2009 the Tribunale Nazionale di Arbitrato per lo Sport awarded Pasqualin eligible to receive €38,900 as agent fee that Zapata owed Pasqualin (5% of annual salary times 2 seasons, 2006–07 and 2007–08).

In October 2007, Zapata along with Andrea Dossena, Roman Eremenko and Simone Pepe was awarded new contracts until June 2012. In June 2008, Zapata was injured and missed 6 months. In the 2009–10 season, Zapata usually played as central defender, partnered with Andrea Coda.

=== Brief spell at Villarreal ===
After the 2010–11 season, Cristián Zapata claimed that many top European clubs were interested in signing him. Zapata signed for Villarreal CF on 12 July 2011. On Wednesday 17 August 2011, in the 2011–12 season, Cristián Zapata made his debut against Udinese in a Champions League qualifier. His La Liga debut came on 29 August against FC Barcelona at the Camp Nou. Deployed as a right-back for the entire game, Zapata and Villarreal suffered a harsh 5–0 defeat.

Initially in the season, Zapata would be a regular starter and a key player for Miguel Ángel Lotina. In addition, he was in constant rotation between a right-back and centre-back position. On 31 October, Zapata suffered a knee injury that ruled him out for 35 days. Subsequently, he missed a total of six games including two UEFA Champions League group stage matches against Manchester City and Bayern Munich. He made his return from injury in the final group stage match against Italian side Napoli. Following a 0–2 defeat, Villarreal finished last of their group with 0 points.

On the last match-day of the season, Zapata played the entire match against Atlético Madrid as Villarreal were relegated with fellow countryman Radamel Falcao scoring the only goal of the game for Atletico. In total, Zapata played 36 matches and provided 1 assist throughout all competitions during his time at Villarreal.

=== AC Milan ===
In August 2012, Villarreal announced that Zapata had left the club to join AC Milan on a season-long loan. Zapata made headline news in the Champions League against Spanish giants Barcelona: Milan's opening goal in a 2–0 victory of the first leg involved the ball being deflected on to his hand and landing in front of Kevin-Prince Boateng who scored seconds later. The referee did not judge it an attempted touch of the ball but allowed Boateng's goal to be counted, while Zapata was credited with an assist. The replay showed the ball making contact with his face. In his first Milan derby against Inter Milan, Zapata was praised for his defending and for playing a key role in counter-attacks. In 2013, Zapata signed a contract with Milan until summer 2016.

In January 2015, Zapata suffered an injury keeping him sidelined for two months. Upon recovery, he featured as an unused substitute.

On 5 February 2017, Zapata was named as captain in his first league game of the season, a 0–1 home defeat against Sampdoria, due to the absence of team captain Riccardo Montolivo and third captain Mattia De Sciglio because of injuries. Vice-captain Ignazio Abate later appeared in the game as a substitute with Zapata keeping the captain's armband. On 15 April 2017, Zapata scored an equalizer in the Milan derby against Inter Milan at the 97th minute. The match resulted in a 2–2 draw. It was also the first Milan game under the ownership of Rossoneri Sport Investment, headed by Li Yonghong, with Zapata giving away his jersey as a gift to the Chinese entrepreneur soon after the final whistle.

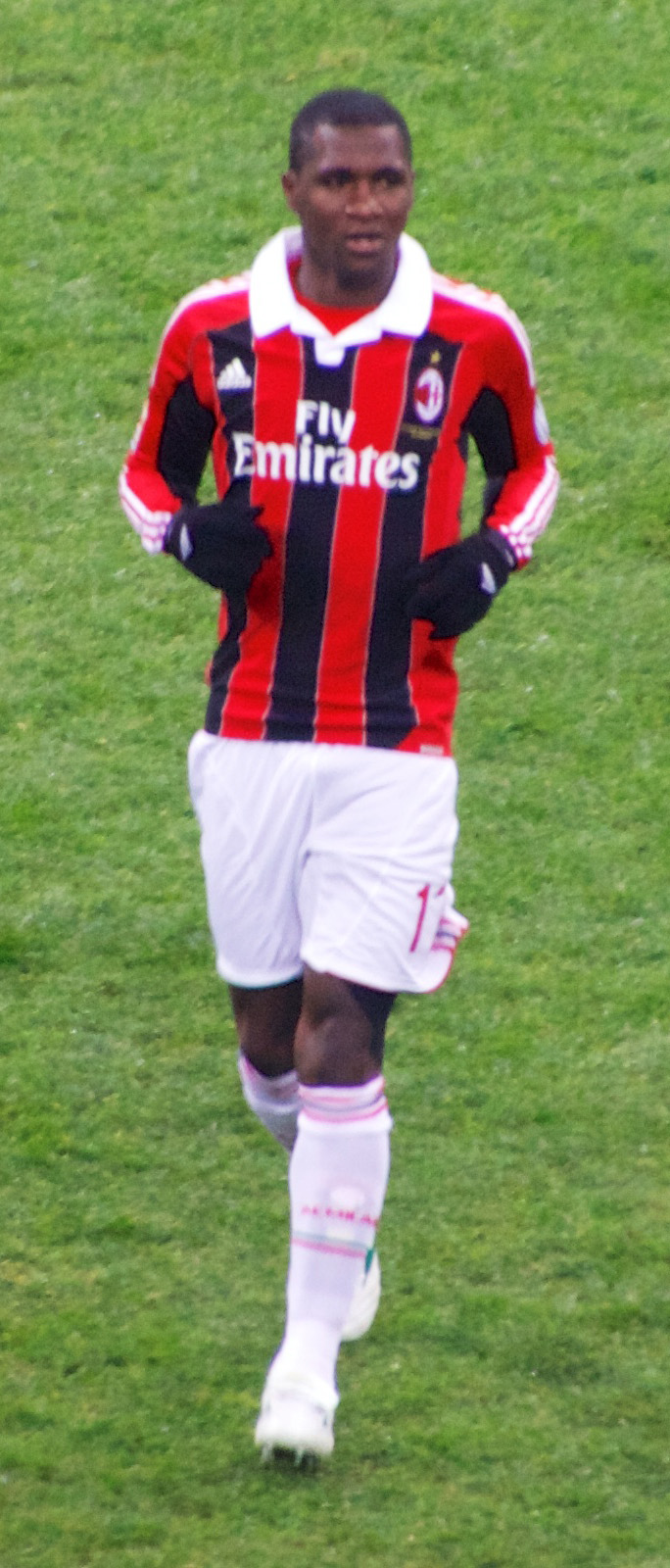
Zapata playing for AC Milan in 2013

On 17 April 2018 he was confirmed to be vice-captain instead of Giacomo Bonaventura as he kept the armband during the game against S.S.C. Napoli, where captain Leonardo Bonucci was unavailable and Giacomo Bonaventura was playing, he celebrated this news with an outstanding performance with his former Villarreal CF teammate Mateo Musacchio.

Zapata began the 2018–19 season with injury, and was third-choice centre-back behind Musacchio and Alessio Romagnoli. His first appearance of the season came on 4 October, in Milan's second Europa League match, a 3–1 at home to Olympiacos. Zapata started the club's final five matches in Europe, including their final match away to Olympiacos, in which Zapata scored at both ends in the second half, two minutes apart. Milan entered the match three points ahead of Olympiacos, seeking to qualify for the knockout stage alongside Real Betis. Milan were losing 1–0 prior to Zapata's goals; the own goal would have sent Olympiacos through on away goals, and the proper goal would have sent Milan through on aggregate. A late penalty was scored by Kostas Fortounis for Olympiacos, and Milan were eliminated as the 3–1 result held, their first group stage elimination in Europe since 2001.

Zapata's Serie A season debut came on 7 October, at home to Chievo Verona. However, Zapata would not play regularly until Musacchio picked up an injury against Real Betis on 8 November. Musacchio missed five games due to the injury, but did not regain his place in the Serie A team following his return to fitness. Zapata started seven of Milan's final eight Serie A matches in 2018 following Musacchio's injury, and also started the club's Coppa Italia extra-time win over Sampdoria and their Supercoppa Italiana defeat to Juventus in 2019. Zapata's run in the team came to an end as he picked up an injury early in Milan's first Serie A game of 2019, away to Genoa. He would not be named to a match-day squad for two months, and by the time he returned, Musacchio had cemented his place in the back line alongside Romagnoli. Zapata would get two more starts the rest of the campaign, finishing the season with 20 appearances in all competitions as his contract with the club expired.

=== Genoa ===
On 2 July 2019, Zapata signed a two-year contract with Serie A club Genoa on a free transfer. Upon his arrival, he became the first Colombian player to sign for Genoa.

=== San Lorenzo ===
On 29 July 2021, Zapata joined Argentine side San Lorenzo, signing a contract until the end of the 2022 season.

=== Atlético Nacional ===
On 2 December 2022, Zapata returned to Colombia after 17 years, signing with Atlético Nacional on a free transfer.

=== Vitória ===
On 16 January 2024, Zapata joined Brazilian club Vitória, on their return to Série A.

=== Atlético Bucaramanga ===
On 5 July 2024, Zapata joined Atlético Bucaramanga.

== International career ==
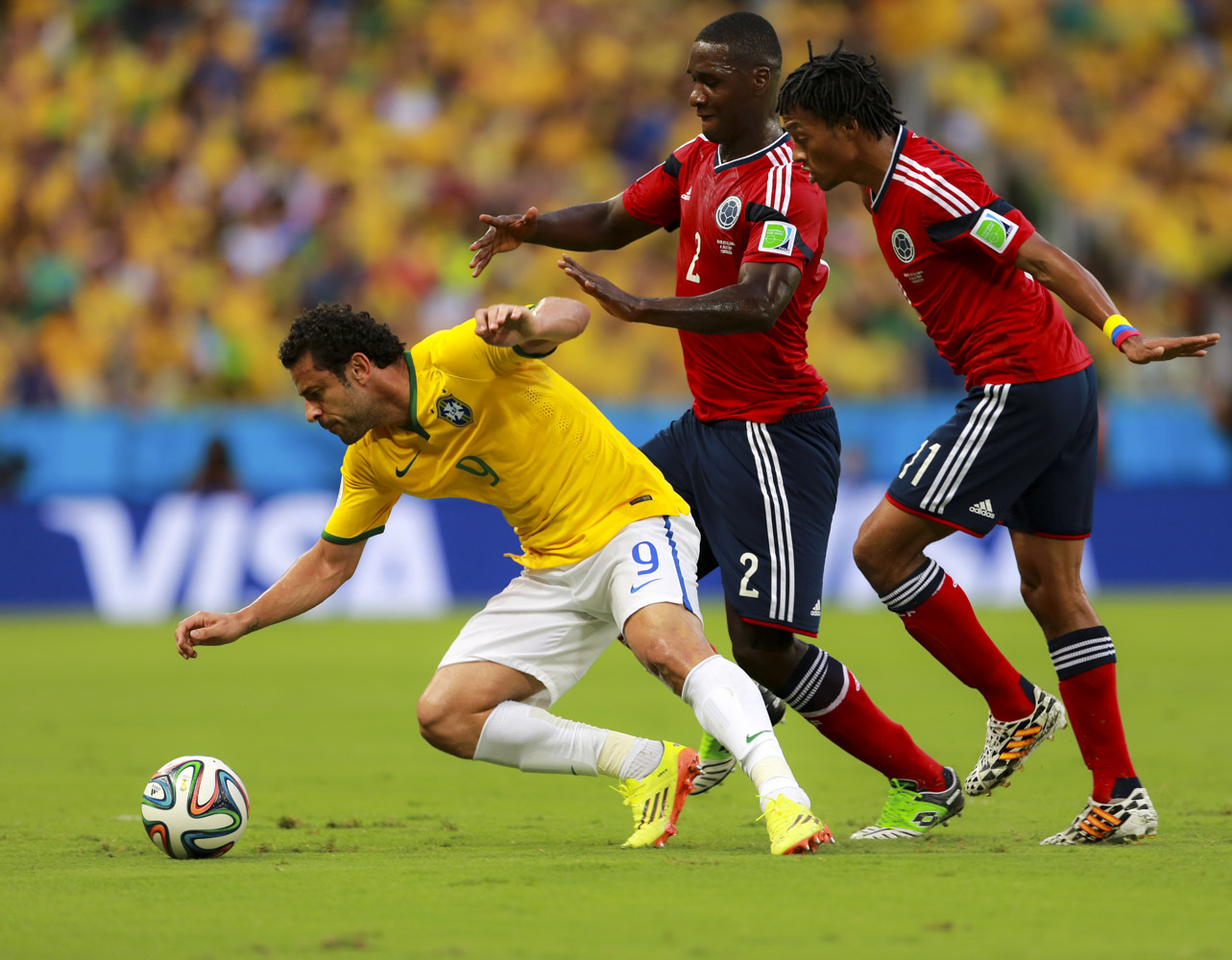
Brazil's Fred competing Colombia's Zapata (in the middle) and Juan Cuadrado for the ball in the quarter-finals of the 2014 FIFA World Cup

Zapata was a member of Colombian U-20 team that won the 2005 South American Youth Championship and the team that played at 2005 FIFA World Youth Championship, who lost to Argentina in the round of 16. Zapata was unavailable in the first 2014 FIFA World Cup qualification match.

In the 2014 FIFA World Cup qualification match, Zapata finally got his first spot chance under new coach Jose Pekerman against South American leaders Argentina. In the 26th minute, while defending the ball inside Colombia's box from Gonzalo Higuaín, Higuain fell to the side while losing balance and kicked the thigh of Zapata in anger. In reaction, Zapata questioned him and kicked him back, resulting in him receiving a red card along with Higuain. Zapata was later criticized for not controlling himself and allowing the referee to give Higuain the red card while simply walking away, which would have allowed Colombia an 11 men advantage over a 10 men Argentina.

In May 2018 he was named in Colombia's preliminary 35-man squad for the 2018 FIFA World Cup in Russia.

On 30 May 2019, Zapata was included in the 23-man final Colombia squad for the 2019 Copa América.

== Personal life ==
Zapata's aunt Limbaina Zapata was kidnapped on 1 May 2013. The kidnappers demanded $150 million in ransom. The following day, the National Police of Colombia located the thieves in Miranda, Cauca, Colombia, and Limbaina Zapata was released with no harm.

He is the cousin of fellow professional footballer Duván Zapata.

On 7 November 2020 he tested positive for COVID-19.

== Career statistics ==
=== Club ===
As of match played 5 August 2024

Appearances and goals by club, season and competition
Club	Season	League			National cup (Note: Includes Copa Colombia, Coppa Italia, Copa del Rey, Copa Argentina and Copa do Brasil)		Continental (Note: Includes CONMEBOL and UEFA competitions)		Other (Note: Includes Torneos de Verano, Superliga Colombiana, Copa do Nordeste and Campeonato Baiano)		Total	
Club	Season	Division	Apps	Goals	Apps	Goals	Apps	Goals	Apps	Goals	Apps	Goals
Deportivo Cali	Apertura 2005	Primera A	17	0	0	0	0	0	—		17	0
Udinese	2005–06	Serie A	20	1	5	0	4	0	—		29	1
Udinese	2006–07	Serie A	36	0	2	0	—		—		38	0
Udinese	2007–08	Serie A	28	1	0	0	—		—		28	1
Udinese	2008–09	Serie A	18	1	2	0	6	0	—		26	1
Udinese	2009–10	Serie A	31	0	4	0	—		—		35	0
Udinese	2010–11	Serie A	35	2	3	0	—		—		38	2
Udinese	Total		168	5	16	0	10	0	—		194	5
Villarreal	2011–12	La Liga	28	0	2	0	6	0	—		36	0
AC Milan	2012–13	Serie A	23	0	1	0	5	0	—		29	0
AC Milan	2013–14	Serie A	20	1	1	0	8	1	—		29	2
AC Milan	2014–15	Serie A	12	0	1	0	0	0	—		13	0
AC Milan	2015–16	Serie A	16	1	5	0	0	0	—		21	1
AC Milan	2016–17	Serie A	15	1	1	0	0	0	—		16	1
AC Milan	2017–18	Serie A	12	0	0	0	8	0	—		20	0
AC Milan	2018–19	Serie A	13	0	2	0	5	1	1	0	20	1
AC Milan	Total		111	3	11	0	26	2	1	0	149	5
Genoa	2019–20	Serie A	20	1	2	0	0	0	—		22	1
Genoa	2020–21	Serie A	12	0	1	0	0	0	—		13	0
Genoa	Total		32	1	3	0	0	0	—		35	1
San Lorenzo	2021	Primera División	17	1	0	0	—		—		17	1
San Lorenzo	2022	Primera División	33	1	3	0	—		3	0	39	1
San Lorenzo	Total		50	2	3	0	—		3	0	56	2
Atlético Nacional	2023	Primera A	38	0	5	0	6	1	2	0	51	1
Vitória	2024	Série A	0	0	0	0	—		6	0	6	0
Atlético Bucaramanga	2024	Primera A	1	0	0	0	0	0	0	0	1	0
Career total			445	11	40	0	48	3	12	0	545	14

=== International ===
As of 23 July 2019

National team	Year	Apps	Goals
Colombia	2007	1	0
Colombia	2008	4	0
Colombia	2009	7	0
Colombia	2010	2	0
Colombia	2011	1	0
Colombia	2012	1	0
Colombia	2013	4	0
Colombia	2014	9	0
Colombia	2015	10	0
Colombia	2016	7	1
Colombia	2017	8	1
Colombia	2018	2	0
Colombia	2019	2	0
Total		58	2

As of match played 10 November 2017. Colombia score listed first, score column indicates score after each Zapata goal.

International goals by date, venue, cap, opponent, score, result and competition
No.	Date	Venue	Cap	Opponent	Score	Result	Competition
1	3 June 2016	Levi's Stadium, Santa Clara, United States	42	United States	1–0	2–0	Copa América Centenario
2	10 November 2017	Suwon World Cup Stadium, Suwon, South Korea	54	South Korea	1–2	1–2	Friendly

== Honours ==
AC Milan

- Supercoppa Italiana: 2016

Atlético Nacional

- Superliga Colombiana: 2023

Colombia U20

- South American Youth Championship: 2005

Colombia

- Copa América third place: 2016
