= Alessandro Plizzari =

Italian footballer (born 2000)

Personal information
- Full name: Alessandro Plizzari
- Date of birth: 12 March 2000 (age 26)
- Place of birth: Crema, Italy
- Height: 1.91 m (6 ft 3 in)
- Position: Goalkeeper

Team information
- Current team: Südtirol (on loan from Venezia)
- Number: 22

Youth career
- AC Milan

Senior career*
| Years | Team | Apps | (Gls) |
| 2016–2022 | AC Milan | 0 | (0) |
| 2017–2018 | → Ternana (loan) | 19 | (0) |
| 2019–2020 | → Livorno (loan) | 21 | (0) |
| 2020–2021 | → Reggina (loan) | 10 | (0) |
| 2022 | → Lecce (loan) | 3 | (0) |
| 2022–2024 | Pescara | 75 | (0) |
| 2024– | Venezia | 0 | (0) |
| 2024–2025 | → Pescara (loan) | 36 | (0) |
| 2026– | → Südtirol (loan) | 1 | (0) |

International career^{‡}
| 2015 | Italy U15 | 7 | (0) |
| 2015 | Italy U16 | 3 | (0) |
| 2016 | Italy U17 | 7 | (0) |
| 2016–2018 | Italy U19 | 14 | (0) |
| 2017–2019 | Italy U20 | 9 | (0) |
| 2019–2022 | Italy U21 | 5 | (0) |
Medal record
Men's football
Representing Italy
FIFA U-20 World Cup
| Bronze medal – third place | 2017 South Korea |
UEFA European Under-19 Championship
| Runner-up | 2018 Finland |
- * Club domestic league appearances and goals as of 22 August 2026 ‡ National team caps and goals as of 22 September 2022

Alessandro Plizzari (born 12 March 2000) is an Italian professional footballer who plays as a goalkeeper for Serie B club Südtirol, on loan from Venezia.

During the 2021–22 football season in Italy, Plizzari was part of the squads that won Serie A (AC Milan) and Serie B (Lecce), sharing halves of the season with each team.

== Club career ==
=== AC Milan ===
Plizzari is a product of AC Milan's youth academy. In July 2016, he was promoted to the first team as a backup goalkeeper and received his first-ever call up to the senior team ahead of a home Serie A game against Udinese played on 11 September 2016, remaining on the bench as an unused substitute. Despite his involvement with the first team, he continued to play for the Primavera (under-19) as a starting goalkeeper throughout the season. In late 2016, Milan rejected a €2 million bid for Plizzari from Manchester City.

==== Loan to Ternana ====
On 4 July 2017, Plizzarri signed a contract extension with Milan until 2020 and was immediately sent on loan to Ternana in Serie B until 30 June 2018. He made his professional debut at 17 years old, on 26 August 2017, in the league match against Empoli. He finished his debut season with 20 appearances in all competitions, conceding a total of 40 goals and keeping one clean sheet.

==== Return to Milan ====
In April 2019, despite making no appearances in the 2018–19 season, Plizzari extended his contract with Milan until the end of June 2023.

==== Loan to Livorno ====
On 1 August 2019, he was loaned out to Serie B club Livorno. He made his debut with Livorno on 5 October, playing as a starter in the league match against Chievo.

==== Loan to Reggina ====
On 21 August 2020, he joined Reggina on loan.

==== Second return to Milan ====
Upon his return from the Reggina loan, he did not appear for Milan in the first half of the 2021–22 season, mostly recovering from a knee surgery.

==== Loan to Lecce ====
On 29 January 2022, he moved on loan to Lecce.

=== Pescara ===
On 26 July 2022, Plizzari joined Serie C club Pescara after few years in Milan.

On 30 August 2024, Plizzari signed a four-year contract with Venezia and was loaned back to Pescara for the rest of the 2024–25 season. On 7 June 2025, Plizzari was instrumental in Pescara's promotion playoff win against Ternana, providing multiple saves during the game and eventually saving three penalties out of four in the resulting shootout, despite an ankle injury he suffered during extra time.

== International career ==
He was the first-choice goalkeeper for the Italy U17 squad at the 2016 UEFA European Under-17 Championship, where Italy was eliminated at the group stage.

He was on the roster for Italy U20 team at the 2017 FIFA U-20 World Cup, where he was the second-choice goalkeeper behind Andrea Zaccagno. He played once at the tournament, in the third-place game, in which Italy beat Uruguay in a penalty shootout after Plizzari saved two penalties by Uruguay players Rodrigo Amaral and Juan Manuel Boselli.

He was the starting goalkeeper for Italy U19 at the 2018 UEFA European Under-19 Championship, as Italy finished runners-up to Portugal.

The following year he took part in the 2019 FIFA U-20 World Cup with the Italy U20 squad, reaching the fourth place.

He made his debut with the Italy U21 on 10 September 2019, in the 2021 UEFA Euro 2021 qualifying match won 5–0 against Luxembourg.

== Career statistics ==
=== Club ===
As of match played 16 August 2025

| Club | League | Season | League | | Cup | | Europe | | Other | | Total | |
| Club | League | Season | Apps | Goals | Apps | Goals | Apps | Goals | Apps | Goals | Apps | Goals |
|---|---|---|---|---|---|---|---|---|---|---|---|---|
| Ternana (loan) | Serie B | 2017–18 | 19 | 0 | 1 | 0 | — | | 0 | 0 | 20 | 0 |
| AC Milan | Serie A | 2018–19 | 0 | 0 | 0 | 0 | — | | 0 | 0 | 0 | 0 |
| Livorno (loan) | Serie B | 2019–20 | 21 | 0 | 0 | 0 | — | | 0 | 0 | 21 | 0 |
| Reggina (loan) | Serie B | 2020–21 | 10 | 0 | 0 | 0 | — | | 0 | 0 | 10 | 0 |
| AC Milan | Serie A | 2021–22 | 0 | 0 | 0 | 0 | — | | 0 | 0 | 0 | 0 |
| Lecce (loan) | Serie B | 2021–22 | 3 | 0 | 0 | 0 | — | | 0 | 0 | 3 | 0 |
| Pescara | Serie C | 2022–23 | 35 | 0 | 0 | 0 | — | | 0 | 0 | 35 | 0 |
| Pescara | Serie C | 2023–24 | 40 | 0 | 4 | 0 | — | | 0 | 0 | 44 | 0 |
| Pescara | Serie C | 2024–25 | 45 | 0 | 1 | 0 | — | | 0 | 0 | 46 | 0 |
| Pescara | Total | | 120 | 0 | 5 | 0 | 0 | 0 | 0 | 0 | 125 | 0 |
| Venezia | 2025–26 | Serie B | 0 | 0 | 1 | 0 | — | | 0 | 0 | 1 | 0 |
| Total | | | 173 | 0 | 7 | 0 | — | | 0 | 0 | 180 | 0 |

== Honours ==
Italy U19

- UEFA European Under-19 Championship runner-up: 2018

Italy U20

- FIFA U-20 World Cup third place: 2017

Pescara

- Serie C Playoff Winner: 2024–25
