= Alexandro Cavagnera =

Belgian footballer

Personal information
- Full name: Alexandro Cavagnera
- Date of birth: 1 December 1998 (age 27)
- Place of birth: Belgium
- Height: 1.85 m (6 ft 1 in)
- Position: Midfielder

Team information
- Current team: Wiltz
- Number: 8

Youth career
- Standard Liège

Senior career*
Years	Team	Apps	(Gls)
2017–2018	Standard Liège	1	(0)
2018–2019	Milan	0	(0)
2018–2019	→ Lugano (loan)	0	(0)
2020–2023	URSL Visé	23	(2)
2023–	Wiltz	85	(8)
- * Club domestic league appearances and goals as of 25 May 2026

Alexandro Cavagnera (born 1 December 1998) is a Belgian footballer who plays as a midfielder for Wiltz in Luxembourg.

He signed with Milan in July 2018, although he spent the season on loan at Swiss club Lugano. He was released by Milan in September 2019. He then signed for Belgian side URSL Vise in July 2020. In August 2023, he signed for Wiltz, where he is currently contracted to 30 June 2027.
