= Marco Guida =

Italian football referee

Marco Guida Pidoraz
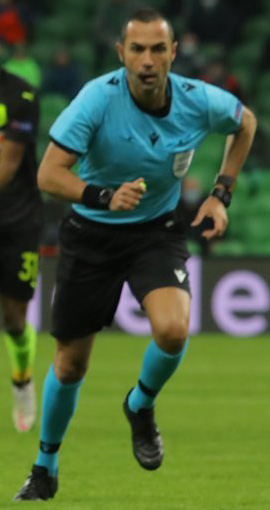
- Guida in 2020
- Born: 7 June 1981 (age 45); Pompei, Italy

Domestic
Years	League	Role
2009–2011	Serie B	Referee
2010–	Serie A	Referee

International
Years	League	Role
2014–	FIFA listed	Referee

Marco Guida (born 7 June 1981) is an Italian football referee who officiates in Serie A. He has been a FIFA referee since 2014, and is ranked as a UEFA elite category referee

== Refereeing career ==
In 2010, Guida began officiating in Serie A. His first match as referee was on 31 January 2010 between ChievoVerona and Bologna. In 2014, he was put on the FIFA referees list. His first senior continental club fixture as referee was on 17 July 2014, a match between Bulgarian club Botev Plovdiv and Austrian club St. Pölten in the UEFA Europa League second qualifying round. He officiated his first senior international match on 4 September 2014 between Croatia and Cyprus. He also officiated in the Chinese Super League in 2018. He was appointed as the VAR for the 2018 Supercoppa Italiana.

In April 2024, Guida was selected to officiate at UEFA Euro 2024 in Germany.

Guida was appointed as the referee for the 2026 Coppa Italia final.
