= Mateo Musacchio =

Argentine footballer (born 1990)

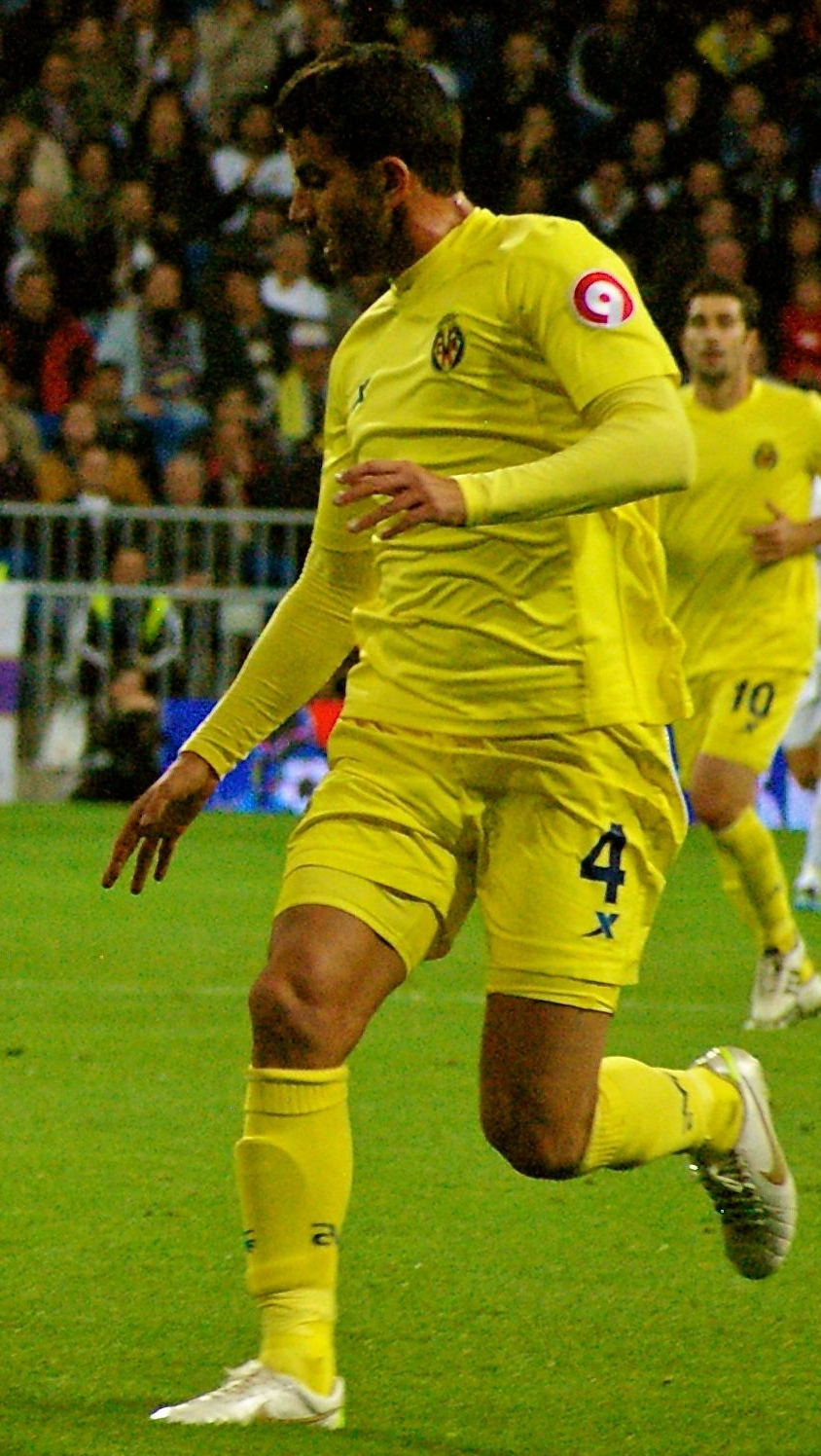
- Musacchio in action for Villarreal in 2012

Personal information
- Full name: Mateo Pablo Musacchio
- Date of birth: 26 August 1990 (age 36)
- Place of birth: Rosario, Argentina
- Height: 1.80 m (5 ft 11 in)
- Position: Centre-back

Youth career
- 25 de Mayo
- 1999–2006: River Plate

Senior career*
Years	Team	Apps	(Gls)
2006–2009	River Plate	10	(0)
2009–2010	Villarreal B	22	(3)
2010–2017	Villarreal	189	(7)
2017–2021	AC Milan	63	(1)
2021	Lazio	4	(0)
Total		288	(11)

International career
2006–2007	Argentina U17	15	(1)
2008–2010	Argentina U20	3	(0)
2011–2017	Argentina	6	(0)
- * Club domestic league appearances and goals

Mateo Pablo Musacchio (Spanish: [maˈteo muˈsakjo], Italian: [muˈzakkjo]; born 26 August 1990) is an Argentine former professional footballer who played as a central defender mainly for LaLiga club Villarreal. Musacchio is the youngest player to debut for Argentine Primera División club River Plate, the club he came from.

He spent most of his 15-year senior career with Villarreal after transferring as a 19-year-old, going on to appear in 249 competitive matches and score seven goals over seven La Liga seasons. In 2017 he joined AC Milan and, four years later, signed with Lazio also of the Italian Serie A.

Musacchio made his full debut for Argentina in 2011.

== Club career ==
=== River Plate ===
A product of Club Atlético River Plate's youth system, Musacchio was born in Rosario, Santa Fe, and he made his first-team debut as a 16-year-old during the 2006–07 season, making four appearances. He was part of the squad that won the Clausura the following year, but did not feature in any games.

=== Villarreal ===
In August 2009, Musacchio moved to Villarreal CF in Spain, initially being assigned to the B team in the Segunda División. He made his official debut on 5 September in a 3–1 away loss against Córdoba CF as the reserves overachieved in their first season ever in that tier, eventually finishing seventh.

On 13 February 2010, shortly after ceasing to be a non-EU player, Musacchio made his La Liga debut by playing the last 15 minutes in a 2–1 home win over Athletic Bilbao. From that moment onwards he was permanently promoted to Villarreal's first team, successively surpassing more experienced Iván Marcano and Gonzalo Rodríguez – the latter his compatriot – in the defensive pecking order.

Musacchio dealt with several injury problems during his spell at the Estadio El Madrigal.

=== AC Milan ===
On 30 May 2017, eight days after passing his medical, Musacchio moved to Italian club AC Milan after signing a four-year contract. He contributed 15 Serie A appearances in his first season, with the subsequent qualification for the UEFA Europa League after a sixth-place finish.

Following Leonardo Bonucci's departure to Juventus FC and Mattia Caldara's two long-term injuries, Musacchio became a starter, oftentimes partnering up with the team's newly appointed captain Alessio Romagnoli. In June 2020, just before the post-pandemic restart of the league competition in Italy, he underwent surgery on his left ankle and missed the remainder of games.

Musacchio played his first match in ten months on 12 January 2021, featuring 62 minutes in a 0–0 penalty shootout victory over Torino FC in the round of 16 of the Coppa Italia.

=== Lazio ===
On 27 January 2021, SS Lazio announced the signing of Musacchio on a permanent deal. He was released at the end of the campaign.

After more than two years without a club, Musacchio retired at the age of 32.

== International career ==
Musacchio was first called by the Argentina national team in May 2011, as manager Sergio Batista only selected players under 25 for friendlies with Nigeria and Poland. He made his debut against the former on 2 June, in a 4–1 defeat.

In 2017, Gianni De Biasi asked Musacchio if he would be interested in playing for Albania of which he was the manager, but the player declined as he wished to represent his country of birth.

== Style of play ==
A press release of AC Milan described Musacchio as a "very physical centre back" with character and agility. Additionally, the article highlighted his marking and blocking abilities, and that he liked to start moves and play short passes."

== Personal life ==
Musacchio's paternal grandparents were of Albanian origin, from Portocannone in lower Molise region, Italy. The surname Musacchio originated from the Muzaka region in south-central Albania, and was widely used in the country's community in Italy.

== Career statistics ==
=== Club ===
Appearances and goals by club, season and competition
Club	Season	League			Cup		Continental		Total	
Club	Season	Division	Apps	Goals	Apps	Goals	Apps	Goals	Apps	Goals
River Plate	2006–07	Argentine Primera División	5	0	0	0	–		5	0
River Plate	2007–08	Argentine Primera División	1	0	0	0	–		1	0
River Plate	2008–09	Argentine Primera División	4	0	0	0	1	0	5	0
River Plate	Total		10	0	0	0	1	0	11	0
Villarreal B	2009–10	Segunda División	22	3	–		–		22	3
Villarreal	2009–10	La Liga	7	0	0	0	1	0	8	0
Villarreal	2010–11	La Liga	31	0	6	0	15	0	52	0
Villarreal	2011–12	La Liga	30	0	2	0	7	0	39	0
Villarreal	2012–13	Segunda División	39	2	1	0	–		40	2
Villarreal	2013–14	La Liga	32	1	3	0	–		35	1
Villarreal	2014–15	La Liga	14	3	3	0	7	0	24	3
Villarreal	2015–16	La Liga	13	1	3	0	5	0	21	1
Villarreal	2016–17	La Liga	23	0	1	0	6	0	30	0
Villarreal	Total		189	7	19	0	41	0	249	7
AC Milan	2017–18	Serie A	15	0	0	0	7	1	22	1
AC Milan	2018–19	Serie A	29	1	3	0	1	0	33	1
AC Milan	2019–20	Serie A	18	0	0	0	–		18	0
AC Milan	2020–21	Serie A	1	0	1	0	0	0	2	0
AC Milan	Total		63	1	4	0	8	1	75	2
Lazio	2020–21	Serie A	4	0	0	0	1	0	5	0
Career total			288	11	23	0	51	1	362	12

=== International ===
Appearances and goals by national team and year
National team	Year	Apps	Goals
Argentina	2011	2	0
Argentina	2015	1	0
Argentina	2016	1	0
Argentina	2017	2	0
Total		6	0

== Honours ==
River Plate

- Argentine Primera División: Clausura 2008
