= Tiémoué Bakayoko =

French footballer (born 1994)

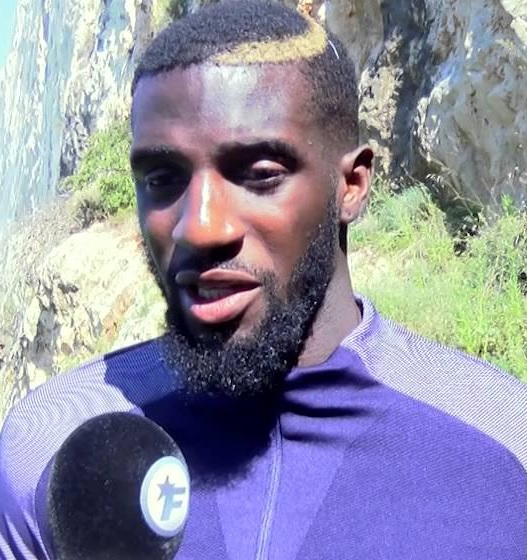
- Bakayoko in 2016

Personal information
- Full name: Tiémoué Bakayoko
- Date of birth: 17 August 1994 (age 32)
- Place of birth: Paris, France
- Height: 1.89 m (6 ft 2 in)
- Position: Defensive midfielder

Youth career
- 2000–2004: Paris 15e Olympique
- 2004–2006: CA Paris-Charenton
- 2006–2008: Montrouge FC 92
- 2008–2013: Rennes

Senior career*
Years	Team	Apps	(Gls)
2012–2014	Rennes B	16	(0)
2013–2014	Rennes	24	(1)
2014–2017	Monaco	63	(3)
2017–2023	Chelsea	29	(2)
2018–2019	→ AC Milan (loan)	31	(1)
2019–2020	→ Monaco (loan)	20	(1)
2020–2021	→ Napoli (loan)	32	(2)
2021–2023	→ AC Milan (loan)	17	(0)
2023–2024	Lorient	20	(2)
2024–2025	PAOK	4	(0)

International career
2010	France U16	2	(0)
2011	France U17	7	(0)
2011	France U18	2	(0)
2014	France U20	3	(0)
2014–2016	France U21	13	(0)
2017	France	1	(0)
- * Club domestic league appearances and goals as of 10 April 2025

Tiémoué Bakayoko (born 17 August 1994) is a French former professional footballer who plays as a defensive midfielder.

Bakayoko plays as a centre midfielder, but can adapt to other positions such as a box-to-box midfielder due to his ability to break up play. He is considered to have all-round ability, as well as possessing physical power and athleticism, with France manager Didier Deschamps describing him as "a complete midfielder."

After suffering a fractured leg as a young player, Bakayoko joined the academy at Rennes at the age of 13. At 14, he was turned down by the Clairefontaine academy. His senior career began at Rennes, where he made 24 appearances before moving to Monaco in 2014 for €8 million. In his first two seasons at the club, Bakayoko made 31 Ligue 1 appearances, but was a regular starter in the 2016–17 season, contributing to Monaco's Ligue 1 title win as well as being named in the 2016–17 UEFA Champions League squad of the season. In 2017, he joined Premier League side Chelsea for £40 million, but after a poor first season with the club, he was loaned out in all future seasons. Bakayoko was eventually released by Chelsea in 2023 and signed for Lorient later that year.

Bakayoko made his only senior international appearance for the France national team in March 2017.

== Early life ==
Bakayoko was born in Paris and played for Paris 15e Olympique at the age of five. Aged nine, he played for CA Paris Charenton before moving to Montrouge FC 92. As a young player, Bakayoko suffered a broken leg which stopped him playing football for eight months. In 2008, at the age of 13, he joined the academy at Rennes. At 14, he was rejected by the renowned Clairefontaine academy.

== Club career ==
=== Rennes ===
Bakayoko made his debut for the Ligue 1 team on 24 August 2013 in a Ligue 1 match against Évian TG, playing the whole match in a 2–1 away win.

=== Monaco ===
==== 2014–2016 ====
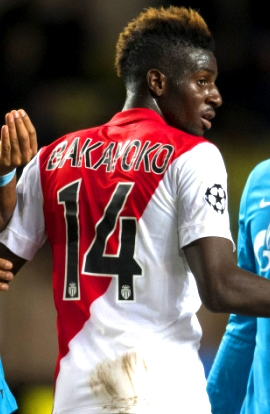
Bakayoko playing for Monaco in 2014

Bakayoko joined Monaco in July 2014 for £7 million, and made his debut for the club on 10 August 2014 in a Ligue 1 match against Lorient. He was replaced by Valère Germain after 32 minutes in a 2–1 home loss. His early substitution by Monaco manager Leonardo Jardim created a strained relationship between the two, with Bakayoko saying: "From then on, something was a little broken between him and me". After his debut, Bakayoko didn't start another match for over two months, with the remainder of his season blighted by injuries and inconsistent form. Difficulties between Jardim continued, with Bakayoko feeling unfairly treated by his manager who had become frustrated at Bakayoko's progress, questioned his attitude during training and was critical of Bakayoko for sometimes being late for meetings.

==== 2016–17 ====
"Makélélé helped me greatly. When he arrived at Monaco I wasn't a very, very good player, but I had a lot of discussions with him. He gave me a lot of advice and he allowed me to play my style of football more simply."

— Bakayoko on the advice he received from Claude Makélélé

Following his first two seasons at Monaco, in which he made 31 Ligue 1 performances, Bakayoko decided to change his behaviour to fulfil his potential, which included moving from a luxury villa to an apartment and changing the colour of his car from pink to black. Additionally, he began boxing, changed his diet and improved his strength. He was helped by former France international Claude Makélélé, who had been appointed director of football at Monaco in 2016, on how to improve his football and take care of himself off the pitch. Bakayoko also sought advice from his former youth coach at Rennes, Yannick Menu. As a result, and with Jérémy Toulalan and Mario Pašalić having both left the club in 2016, Bakayoko became a regular starter for Monaco, helping the club to the Ligue 1 title in the 2016–17 season and named in the 2016–17 UEFA Champions League squad of the season. It was a decisive season for Bakayoko. Not only had he established himself as an important part of Monaco's team with consistent performances, he had fewer injuries and his application during training was no longer criticised.

During the 2016–17 UEFA Champions League round of 16-second leg match at the Stade Louis II on 15 March 2017, Bakayoko scored the final goal (it was his first ever UEFA Europa League or UEFA Champions League goal) with a header from a Thomas Lemar free-kick to help Monaco secure a vital goal against Manchester City. Monaco won 3–1 and won the tie on the away goals rule (aggregate score 6–6).

During an interview, Bakayoko said a recurrence of an knee injury from 2015 leading to a crack in the meniscus caused him a lot of discomfort during his final season at Monaco: "People don't know but throughout the whole of last season I suffered because of my knee. I really had to grit my teeth in every match."

=== Chelsea ===
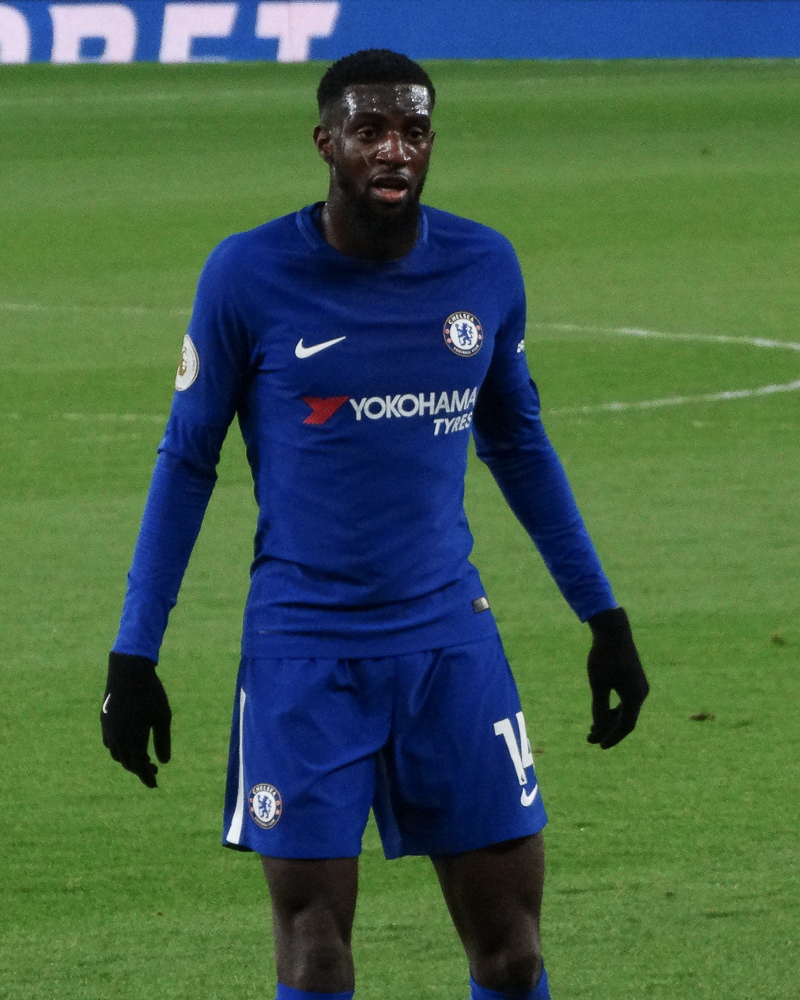
Bakayoko playing for Chelsea in 2018

On 15 July 2017, Bakayoko signed for Premier League club Chelsea on a five-year contract for a fee around the margin of £40 million, making him the club's second most expensive signing at the time, after Fernando Torres. He made his Chelsea debut in a 2–1 away win over Tottenham Hotspur in the Premier League on 20 August 2017. On 5 February, he was sent off for the first time in his Chelsea career, in a 4–1 loss away to Watford. Bakayoko was given his marching orders for two bookable offences, one on Étienne Capoue and the other on Richarlison, both in the first half.

Bakayoko failed to impress in his first season. He was criticised for his performances by fans and pundits alike, with games against both Watford, where he was sent off after only 30 minutes, and a 3–0 away defeat by Newcastle United on the last day of the Premier League season being singled out as two of his worst.

Bakayoko continued his poor form into the 2018–19 season, finding himself culpable for Inter Milan's equaliser in a 1–1 pre-season draw, having lost possession in midfield.

==== Loan to AC Milan ====
On 14 August 2018, Bakayoko signed for Serie A club AC Milan on a season-long loan for a fee of €5 million with an option to make the move permanent for €35 million.

His career in Italy did not get off to a good start, and he was labelled 'confused’, 'a disaster', and 'messy' after a poor performance in a UEFA Europa League game against Olympiacos, in which he gifted the Greek team the opener in a 3–1 win. However, his form improved dramatically late in 2018.

Bakayoko was subjected to racial abuse by the travelling Lazio ultras during the second leg of the Coppa Italia semifinal match against Lazio, in which the game was not suspended and saw Milan eliminated 1–0.

==== Return to Monaco on loan ====
On 31 August 2019, Bakayoko agreed to rejoin Ligue 1 club Monaco on loan until the end of the 2019–20 season, with an option to make the move permanent for a reported fee of €42.5 million.

==== Loan to Napoli ====
On 6 October 2020, Bakayoko returned to Italy with Napoli on a season-long loan. He would play again for Gennaro Gattuso, the current manager of the club who was in charge of AC Milan when Bakayoko spent the 2018–19 season there. He made his debut for the club on 17 October 2020, as Napoli beat Atalanta 4–1 at home. On 10 January 2021, he scored his first goal for the club to grant Napoli a late win, 2–1 at home to Udinese.

==== Return to AC Milan on loan ====
On 30 August 2021, Bakayoko returned to Milan on a two-year loan until 2023 with an option to buy. On 11 December against Udinese, he started the match in the midfield alongside Bennacer, On the 17th minute, he failed to receive the latter's pass which was intercepted by Udinese players and ended in their only goal of the match which ended 1–1. On 22 December, he came on as substitute against Empoli, he gave the opponents a penalty after the ball touched his hand.

On 16 June 2023, Chelsea confirmed Bakayoko would depart after the end of the season.

=== Lorient ===
On 31 August 2023, Bakayoko joined Lorient on a free transfer until 2025. On 11 February 2024, he scored his first goal for the club in a 2-0 victory over Reims.

=== PAOK ===
On 31 August 2024, Bakayoko signed a one year contract, with an option for a second year, with Greek side PAOK. He left the club in July 2025. Without a club since being released by PAOK, in October 2026 Bakayoko trained with Scottish Premiership club Celtic.

== International career ==
Bakayoko was a finalist in the 2014 Toulon Tournament.

Bakayoko was called up to the senior France squad for the first time to face Luxembourg and Spain in March 2017 after Paul Pogba withdrew through injury. He made his debut on 28 March 2017 against the latter, replacing Adrien Rabiot at half-time of a 2–0 friendly home loss.

He was approached by the Ivory Coast national team before he chose France in 2017. With only one cap for France in a friendly match, he remains eligible to switch nationality.

== Style of play ==
Bakayoko has been compared to Yaya Touré due to his strong all-round qualities of pace, intelligent reading of the game, ability to intercept passes and accomplished tackling, passing and dribbling, as well as being physically powerful and athletic. He plays as a centre midfielder in the centre of the pitch, breaking up attacks and making driving forward runs; as such, he has also been labelled a "box-to-box midfielder." Bakayoko's manager at Monaco, Leonardo Jardim, said: "He wins a lot of balls, brings balance to the team. He passes the ball well and wins his duels. That is Bakayoko's role." France manager Didier Deschamps described Bakayoko as "a complete midfielder", and said: "He has an important athletic presence, he's good at recovery, he scores decisive goals and is able to project himself." His manager at Milan, Gennaro Gattuso, said that Bakayoko plays as a deep-lying midfielder in an atypical way, because sometimes prefers to point and go past the opponent instead of launching the ball, so creating a numerical advantage in favour of his team.

== Personal life ==
Bakayoko is of Ivorian descent.

In July 2022, Bakayoko was controversially held at gunpoint by Milan police in a case of mistaken identity.

== Career statistics ==
=== Club ===
As of match played 10 April 2025

Appearances and goals by club, season and competition
Club	Season	League			National cup (Note: Includes Coupe de France, FA Cup, Coppa Italia)		League cup (Note: Includes Coupe de la Ligue, EFL Cup)		Continental		Other		Total	
Club	Season	Division	Apps	Goals	Apps	Goals	Apps	Goals	Apps	Goals	Apps	Goals	Apps	Goals
Rennes	2013–14	Ligue 1	24	1	3	0	1	0	—		—		28	1
Monaco	2014–15	Ligue 1	12	0	1	0	2	0	3 (Note: Appearance(s) in UEFA Champions League)	0	—		18	0
Monaco	2015–16	Ligue 1	19	1	2	1	1	0	1 (Note: Appearance(s) in UEFA Europa League)	0	—		23	2
Monaco	2016–17	Ligue 1	32	2	1	0	4	0	14	1	—		51	3
Monaco	Total		63	3	4	1	7	0	18	1	0	0	92	5
Chelsea	2017–18	Premier League	29	2	5	0	4	0	5	1	–		43	3
AC Milan (loan)	2018–19	Serie A	31	1	4	0	—		6	0	1 (Note: Appearance in Supercoppa Italiana)	0	42	1
Monaco (loan)	2019–20	Ligue 1	20	1	2	0	1	0	—		—		23	1
Napoli (loan)	2020–21	Serie A	32	2	4	0	—		7	0	1	0	44	2
AC Milan (loan)	2021–22	Serie A	14	0	1	0	—		3	0	—		18	0
AC Milan (loan)	2022–23	Serie A	3	0	0	0	—		0	0	—		3	0
AC Milan (loan)	Total		17	0	1	0	0	0	3	0	0	0	21	0
Lorient	2023–24	Ligue 1	20	2	1	0	—		—		—		21	2
PAOK	2024–25	Super League Greece	4	0	1	0	—		4	0	—		9	0
Career total			240	12	25	1	13	0	43	2	2	0	323	15

=== International ===
As of match played 28 March 2017

Appearances and goals by national team and year
National team	Year	Apps	Goals
France	2017	1	0
Total		1	0

== Honours ==
Monaco

- Ligue 1: 2016–17

Chelsea

- FA Cup: 2017–18

AC Milan

- Serie A: 2021–22

Individual

- UEFA Champions League Squad of the Season: 2016–17
