= José Mauri =

Footballer (born 1996)

Personal information
- Full name: José Agustín Mauri
- Date of birth: 16 May 1996 (age 30)
- Place of birth: Realicó, Argentina
- Height: 1.69 m (5 ft 6 1/2 in)
- Position: Midfielder

Youth career
- Ferro de Realicó
- Talleres Huinca Renancó
- Ferro de Alvear
- 2011–2013: Parma

Senior career*
Years	Team	Apps	(Gls)
2013–2015	Parma	35	(3)
2015–2019	AC Milan	11	(0)
2016–2017	→ Empoli (loan)	14	(0)
2019–2021	Talleres	15	(0)
2021–2022	Sporting Kansas City	9	(1)
2023–2024	Sarmiento	14	(1)
2024–2025	Cosenza	14	(0)

International career
2012	Italy U16	2	(0)
2012	Italy U17	6	(2)
2015	Italy U21	0	(0)
- * Club domestic league appearances and goals as of 18 January 2025

José Agustín Mauri (born 16 May 1996) is a professional footballer who plays as a midfielder. Born in Argentina, Mauri is of Italian descent and has represented Italy internationally at youth level.

== Club career ==
=== Parma ===
Mauri made his debut for Parma as a substitute on 3 December 2013 in the fourth round of the Coppa Italia, replacing Gianni Munari for the last 27 minutes of a 4–1 home win against A.S. Varese 1910 at the Stadio Ennio Tardini.

On 11 April 2015, he scored the only goal in a 1–0 win against Juventus, with his team in last position and the opponents leading the league. He described it as "the happiest day of my life".

=== AC Milan ===
At the start of the 2015–16 season, Mauri joined AC Milan on a four-year deal on a free transfer. However, Milan also paid €4 million to unknown parties. Mauri made his first full debut on 1 December, playing 99 minutes of a Coppa Italia game against Crotone, with Milan winning 3–1 after extra time. He made his Serie A debut for Milan against Chievo Verona on 13 March 2016, playing the last five minutes of the 0–0 away draw.

==== Empoli ====
On 30 August 2016, he was loaned out to Serie A club Empoli for the season.

=== Talleres ===
On 27 September 2019, he moved to Argentine Primera División side Talleres de Córdoba.

=== Sporting Kansas City ===
On 5 August 2021, Mauri signed with MLS side Sporting Kansas City on a one-and-a-half-year deal. In April 2022, the club mutually agreed to terminate contract of Mauri.

=== Sarmiento ===
On 12 December 2022, Mauri returned to Argentina, joining Primera División club Sarmiento, signing a one-year contract. On 6 February 2023, he suffered a torn cruciate ligament on his left knee and was sidelined for 6 to 8 months. On 22 January 2024, he extended his contract until December 2024.

=== Cosenza ===
On 9 August 2024, Mauri returned to Italy and signed with Cosenza in Serie B for one season, with an option for a second. He was released from his Cosenza contract by mutual consent on 20 January 2025.

== International career ==
As one of his grandmothers was Italian, Mauri is eligible for both Argentina and Italy. Despite playing for Italy's youth international squads, Mauri declined a call-up to the Italian U20 squad, declaring his desire to represent solely Argentina in international competition.

He was selected to Italy U-21 squad for the first time by Luigi Di Biagio, for 2017 UEFA European Under-21 Championship qualifier against Slovenia, scheduled for 8 September 2015.

== Personal life ==
His older brother Juan Mauri is also a football player and signed with Milan at the same time as José did.

== Career statistics ==
=== Club ===
As of match played 3 May 2024

Appearances and goals by club, season and competition
Club	Season	League			Cup		Continental		Other		Total	
Club	Season	Division	Apps	Goals	Apps	Goals	Apps	Goals	Apps	Goals	Apps	Goals
Parma	2013–14	Serie A	2	1	1	0	—		—		3	1
Parma	2014–15	Serie A	33	2	0	0	—		—		33	2
Parma	Total		35	3	1	0	—		—		36	3
Milan	2015–16	Serie A	5	0	5	0	—		—		10	0
Milan	2017–18	Serie A	1	0	0	0	3 (Note: Appearances in UEFA Europa League)	0	—		4	0
Milan	2018–19	Serie A	5	0	0	0	2	0	—		7	0
Milan	Total		11	0	5	0	5	0	—		21	0
Empoli (loan)	2016–17	Serie A	14	0	1	0	—		—		15	0
Talleres	2019–20	Argentine Primera División	11	0	1 (Note: Appearance in Copa de la Superliga)	0	—		1 (Note: Appearance in Torneo de Verano)	0	13	0
Talleres	2021	Argentine Primera División	4	0	0	0	3 (Note: Appearances in Copa Sudamericana)	0	—		7	0
Talleres	Total		15	0	1	0	3	0	1	0	20	0
Sporting Kansas City	2021	Major League Soccer	9	1	0	0	—		—		9	1
Sporting Kansas City	2022	Major League Soccer	1	0	0	0	—		—		1	0
Sporting Kansas City	Total		10	1	0	0	0	0	0	0	10	1
Sarmiento	2023	Argentine Primera División	2	0	0	0	—		—		2	0
Sarmiento	2024	Argentine Primera División	11	1	0	0	—		—		11	1
Sarmiento	Total		13	1	0	0	0	0	0	0	13	1
Career total			98	5	8	0	8	0	1	0	115	5
