= Alessio Romagnoli =

Italian footballer (born 1995)

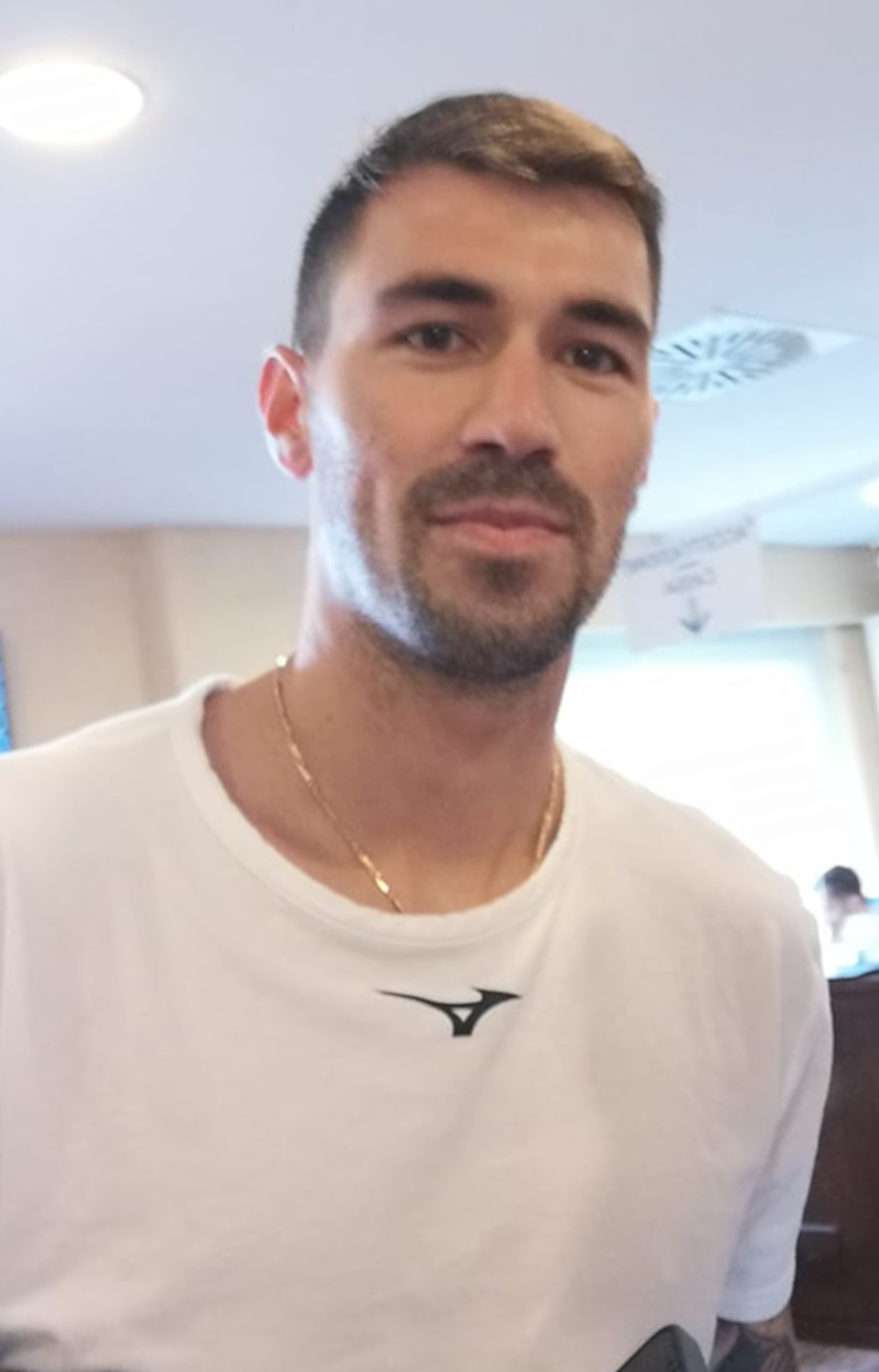
- Romagnoli in 2022

Personal information
- Full name: Alessio Romagnoli
- Date of birth: 12 January 1995 (age 31)
- Place of birth: Anzio, Italy
- Height: 1.85 m (6 ft 1 in)
- Position: Centre-back

Team information
- Current team: Al Sadd
- Number: 26

Youth career
- 2003–2012: Roma

Senior career*
Years	Team	Apps	(Gls)
2012–2015	Roma	13	(1)
2014–2015	→ Sampdoria (loan)	30	(2)
2015–2022	AC Milan	197	(8)
2022–2026	Lazio	127	(4)
2026–	Al Sadd	1	(0)

International career
2011	Italy U16	3	(0)
2011–2012	Italy U17	6	(0)
2012–2014	Italy U19	12	(0)
2014–2016	Italy U21	15	(1)
2016–2023	Italy	13	(2)
- * Club domestic league appearances and goals as of 10 September 2026

Alessio Romagnoli (born 12 January 1995) is an Italian professional footballer who plays as a centre-back for Qatar Stars League club Al Sadd.

Romagnoli began his career with Roma in 2012, and later spent a season on loan with Sampdoria in 2014, before moving to AC Milan in 2015. At the start of the 2018–19 Serie A season, he was named the team's captain following Leonardo Bonucci's departure, before joining Lazio in 2022.

== Club career ==
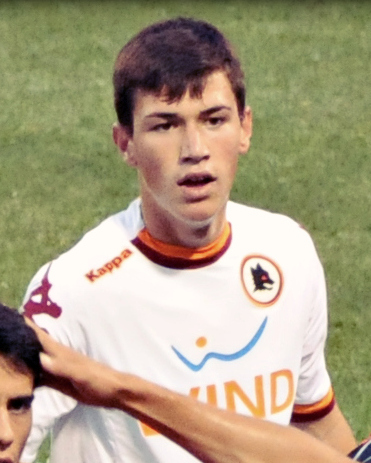
Romagnoli in 2012

=== Roma ===
A product of Roma's youth academy, Romagnoli was included in the first team squad by new head coach Zdeněk Zeman at age 17. He made his senior debut on 11 December 2012 against Atalanta, playing the full game in the Coppa Italia as a starter. He made his Serie A debut 12 days later, as a substitute in the final minutes of a league game against AC Milan. He scored his first goal in Serie A on 3 March 2013 against Genoa.

He found more first-team opportunities in the second half of the 2013–14 season under new manager Rudi Garcia, both at full-back and in the centre of defence. On 31 May 2014, Romagnoli signed a new four-year contract with Roma.

==== Loan to Sampdoria ====
On 1 September 2014, Romagnoli was loaned to Sampdoria for €500,000, with an option to purchase for €2 million, as well as a counter-option of €750,000. Romagnoli made his Sampdoria debut as a late substitute in a 2–0 victory against Torino on 14 September. He scored his first goal for Sampdoria on 24 September 2014 in a 2–1 defeat of Chievo. In June 2015, Roma activated the buy-back clause, and he returned to the club.

=== AC Milan ===
==== 2015–16 season ====
On 11 August 2015, he was sold to A.C. Milan for a fee of €25 million, signing a five-year contract. In addition, there was a sell-on clause entitling Roma to 30% over the value of €25 million. He made his official debut for Milan on 18 August, in a 2–0 win over Perugia in Coppa Italia. Six days later, he made his first appearance in the league with the club, as Milan lost 2–0 to Fiorentina.

On 1 March 2016, he scored his first goal for Milan in a 5–0 win against Alessandria in the Coppa Italia. This match sent Milan to the final for the first time since 2003. He concluded his first season with Milan with 40 appearances in all competitions and one goal.

==== 2016–17 season ====
Romagnoli made his first appearance of the 2016–17 season in a 3–2 victory in Serie A against Torino. On 23 December, Romagnoli helped lead Milan to victory in the Supercoppa Italiana, playing the full 120 minutes as Milan beat Juventus 4–3 in the penalty shoot-out following a 1–1 draw after extra time. On 15 April 2017, Romagnoli scored his first ever Serie A goal for Milan in the Derby della Madonnina.

==== 2017–18 season ====
After missing Milan's first 4 games of the season due to injury, he returned to the squad, and he made his return to play the second leg of Europa League playoffs against Shkëndija. On 19 September 2017, he made his first appearance of the Serie A season against Udinese.

==== 2018–19 season ====
Following Leonardo Bonucci's return to Juventus, Romagnoli was appointed as Milan's team captain a few months after he renewed his contract on 5 June 2018. Romagnoli scored stoppage-time winning goals two times in five days for Milan, earning his club a 2–1 win over Genoa and a 1–0 win over Udinese.

==== 2019–20 season ====
Romagnoli was the only player on the team to have been featured in every game of the season before a muscle injury on 21 July 2020 in a home game against Sassuolo. Having his captain's armband handed in to Gianluigi Donnarumma, he was substituted for Matteo Gabbia after 32 minutes and missed the last three games of the season. He finished the season with 39 games in total and one goal.

==== 2020–21 season ====
In his sixth season for Milan, Romagnoli had a string of minor injuries and a series of poor performances, causing him to unexpectedly lose his place in the starting 11 to Fikayo Tomori, a loanee who arrived from Chelsea during the winter transfer window. Rarely playing in the second half of season, he made just 22 appearances in Serie A, scoring one goal on 29 November 2020 in a 2–0 home win over Fiorentina. Following the sub-par season, Romagnoli was not called up by the national team coach Roberto Mancini to join the provisional squad for UEFA Euro 2020 (competition postponed for a year due to the pandemic) and was also rumored to have been placed on a transfer market due to the expiration of his contract in June 2022 and unwillingness of the club management to deal with agent Mino Raiola, who had convinced the team's goalkeeper Gianluigi Donnarumma to leave the club as a free agent.

==== 2021–22 season ====
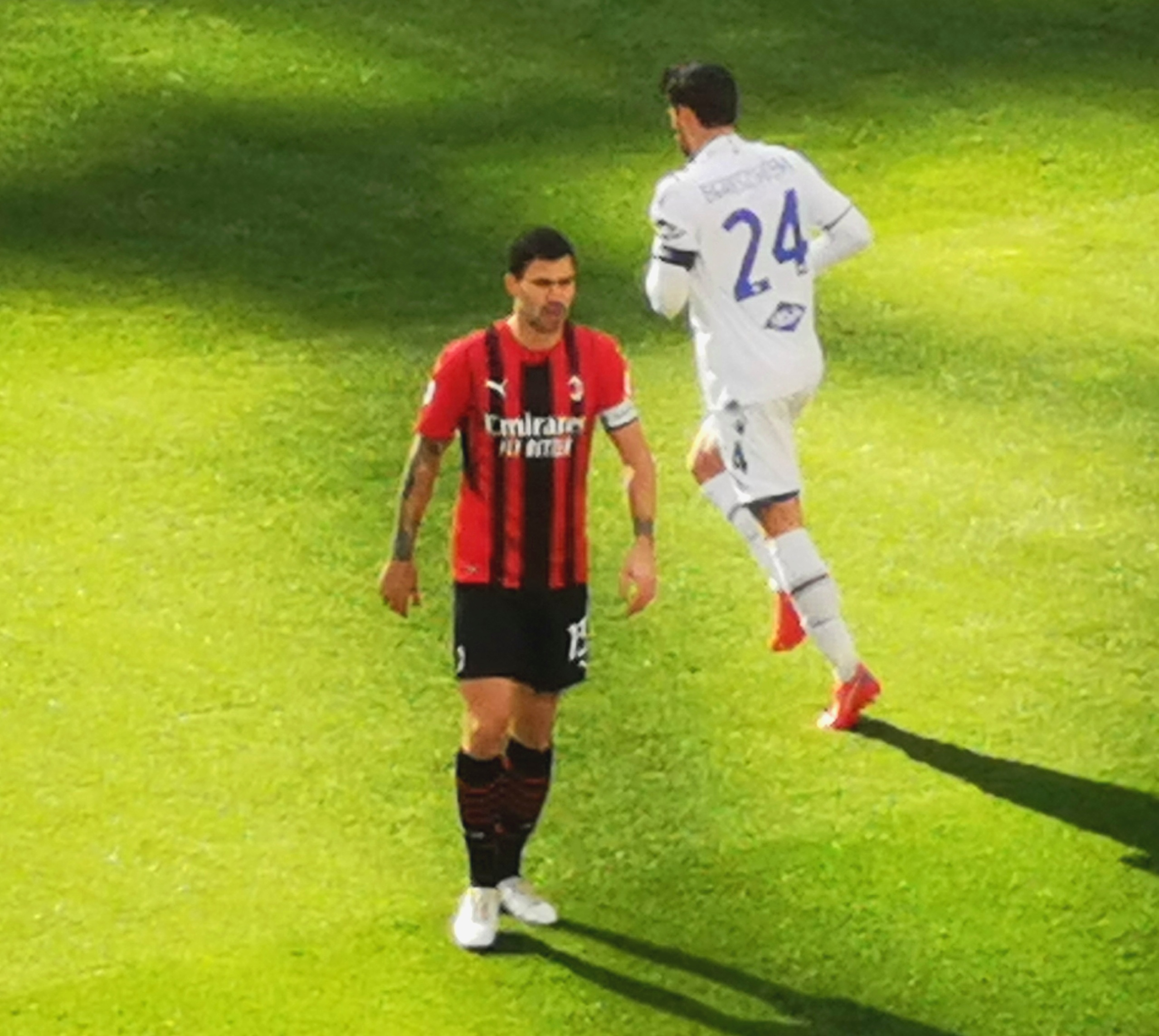
Romagnoli captaining Milan in 2022

On 28 November 2021, Romagnoli scored his first goal of the season against Sassuolo in an eventual 3–1 loss. On 9 February 2022, against Lazio in the Coppa Italia, he assisted the opening goal in an eventual 4–0 win, a long pass through the field to his teammate Leao. Romagnoli rejected a contract extension from Milan and thus left the club at the end of the season.

=== Lazio ===
==== 2022-23 season ====
On 12 July 2022, Romagnoli signed a five-year contract with Lazio. On 2 October 2022, he scored his first goal for the Biancocelesti in a 4-0 victory over Spezia Calcio.

==== 2024-25 season ====
Romagnoli scored his first UEFA Europa League goal for Lazio in a 2-1 victory over FC Porto on 7 November 2024. On 13 March 2025, Romagnoli became just the second defender in Lazio history to score in both legs of a European double-encounter during the Round of 16 against Viktoria Plzen.

== International career ==
Romagnoli has represented Italy on multiple occasions at under-16, under-17 and under-19 levels. He debuted for the Italy under-21 team against Northern Ireland on 5 March 2014, playing the full match. With the Italy under-21, Romagnoli took part at the 2015 UEFA European Under-21 Championship, forming an effective partnership with fellow centre-back Daniele Rugani.

On 27 August 2016, Romagnoli received his first call-up to the Italian senior squad for a friendly match against France on 1 September and a 2018 World Cup qualification match on 5 September against Israel. However, he was later moved to the under-21 squad for 2017 UEFA European Under-21 Championship qualification match against Serbia.

In a 2018 FIFA World Cup qualification on 6 October 2016, Romagnoli debuted by playing all 90 minutes, in a 1–1 home draw against Spain. On 15 October 2019, he scored his first senior international goal in a 5–0 away victory against Liechtenstein, in a UEFA Euro 2020 qualifying match.

== Style of play ==
A left-footed centre-back, Romagnoli is known for his confidence in possession, and ability to play the ball out from the back; due to his ability to advance into more attacking positions or put pressure on opponents higher up on the pitch. He is also capable of functioning as a left-sided full-back. Romagnoli is effective in the air and known for his ability to time his challenges. Regarded as one of the most promising young Italian defenders of his generation, his technique, positional sense, decision-making, and tackling abilities have led pundits to compare him with Italian defender Alessandro Nesta, whom Romagnoli has described as his footballing idol. In 2015, Romagnoli was named one of the top 100 young footballers in the world born after 1994 by Don Balón.

== Career statistics ==
=== Club ===
As of match played 23 May 2026

Appearances and goals by club, season and competition
Club	Season	League			Coppa Italia		Europe		Other		Total	
Club	Season	Division	Apps	Goals	Apps	Goals	Apps	Goals	Apps	Goals	Apps	Goals
Roma	2012–13	Serie A	2	1	1	0	—				3	1
Roma	2013–14	Serie A	11	0	0	0	—				11	0
Roma	Total		13	1	1	0	—				14	1
Sampdoria (loan)	2014–15	Serie A	30	2	1	0	—		—		31	2
AC Milan	2015–16	Serie A	34	0	6	1	—		—		40	1
AC Milan	2016–17	Serie A	27	1	1	0	—		1 (Note: Appearance in Supercoppa Italiana)	0	29	1
AC Milan	2017–18	Serie A	28	2	5	1	9 (Note: Appearance(s) in UEFA Europa League)	0	—		42	3
AC Milan	2018–19	Serie A	32	2	4	0	4	0	1	0	41	2
AC Milan	2019–20	Serie A	35	1	4	0	—		—		39	1
AC Milan	2020–21	Serie A	22	1	2	0	6	0	—		29	1
AC Milan	2021–22	Serie A	19	1	2	0	5 (Note: Appearance(s) in UEFA Champions League)	0	—		26	1
AC Milan	Total		197	8	24	2	24	0	2	0	247	10
Lazio	2022–23	Serie A	34	2	2	0	6 (Note: Four appearances in UEFA Europa League, two appearances in UEFA Europa Conference League)	0	—		42	2
Lazio	2023–24	Serie A	29	0	3	0	6	0	1	0	39	0
Lazio	2024–25	Serie A	32	2	1	0	10	3	—		43	5
Lazio	2025–26	Serie A	32	0	5	1	—		—		37	1
Lazio	Total		127	4	11	1	22	3	1	0	161	8
Career total			367	15	37	3	46	3	3	0	453	21

=== International ===
As of match played 26 March 2023

Appearances and goals by national team and year
National team	Year	Apps	Goals
Italy	2016	4	0
Italy	2017	1	0
Italy	2018	3	0
Italy	2019	4	2
Italy	2020	0	0
Italy	2021	0	0
Italy	2022	0	0
Italy	2023	1	0
Total		13	2

As of match played 18 November 2019
Scores and results list Italy's goal tally first, score column indicates score after each Romagnoli goal

List of international goals scored by Alessio Romagnoli
No.	Date	Venue	Cap	Opponent	Score	Result	Competition
1	15 October 2019	Rheinpark Stadion, Vaduz, Liechtenstein	11	Liechtenstein	3–0	5–0	UEFA Euro 2020 qualifying
2	18 November 2019	Stadio Renzo Barbera, Palermo, Italy	12	Armenia	6–0	9–1	UEFA Euro 2020 qualifying

== Honours ==
Roma

- Coppa Italia runner-up: 2012–13

AC Milan

- Serie A: 2021–22
- Coppa Italia runner-up: 2015–16, 2017–18
- Supercoppa Italiana: 2016

Lazio

- Coppa Italia runner-up: 2025–26
