= 2012–13 Genoa CFC season =

Genoa
2012–13 season
- Chairman: Enrico Preziosi
- Head Coach: Luigi De Canio (22 April 2012 – 22 October 2012); Luigi Delneri (22 October 2012 – 22 January 2013); Davide Ballardini (22 January 2013 -)
- Serie A: 17th
- Top goalscorer: Marco Borriello (12)
- Highest home attendance: 40,965 vs Internazionale (22 December 2012)
- Lowest home attendance: 8,076 vs Siena (4 November 2012)
| Home colours | Away colours |

The 2012–13 Genoa CFC season is the club's sixth consecutive Serie A season of the football. This article lists its season results, transfers and statistics.

== Current squad ==
Note: Flags indicate national team as defined under FIFA eligibility rules; some limited exceptions apply. Players may hold more than one non-FIFA nationality.

| No. | Pos. | Nation | Player |
|---|---|---|---|
| 1 | GK | (France) FRA | Sébastien Frey |
| 3 | DF | (Italy) ITA | Cesare Bovo |
| 4 | DF | (Italy) ITA | Damiano Ferronetti |
| 5 | DF | (Sweden) SWE | Andreas Granqvist |
| 7 | MF | (Italy) ITA | Marco Rossi |
| 8 | MF | (Peru) PER | Juan Manuel Vargas |
| 9 | FW | (Uruguay) URU | Leonardo Melazzi |
| 10 | MF | (Uruguay) URU | Rubén Olivera |
| 11 | FW | (Serbia) SRB | Boško Janković |
| 13 | DF | (Italy) ITA | Luca Antonelli |
| 14 | FW | (Italy) ITA | Marco Rigoni |
| 15 | DF | (Slovenia) SVN | Luka Krajnc |
| 16 | FW | (Sweden) SWE | Linus Hallenius |
| 17 | FW | (Italy) ITA | Ciro Immobile |
| 18 | FW | (Italy) ITA | Giammario Piscitella |
| 19 | FW | (Chile) CHI | Cristóbal Jorquera |

| No. | Pos. | Nation | Player |
|---|---|---|---|
| 20 | DF | (Italy) ITA | Alberto Marchiori |
| 21 | DF | (Italy) ITA | Thomas Manfredini |
| 22 | FW | (Italy) ITA | Marco Borriello |
| 23 | FW | (Ghana) GHA | Said Ahmed Said |
| 24 | DF | (Italy) ITA | Emiliano Moretti |
| 26 | DF | (Italy) ITA | Mattia Cassani |
| 27 | MF | (Brazil) BRA | Matuzalém |
| 28 | MF | (Hungary) HUN | Dániel Tőzsér |
| 29 | FW | (Bosnia and Herzegovina) BIH | Enis Nadarević |
| 30 | GK | (Greece) GRE | Alexandros Tzorvas |
| 32 | GK | (Italy) ITA | Antonio Donnarumma |
| 33 | MF | (Slovakia) SVK | Juraj Kucka |
| 83 | FW | (Italy) ITA | Antonio Floro Flores |
| 87 | DF | (Italy) ITA | Eros Pisano |
| 90 | DF | (Italy) ITA | Daniele Portanova |
| 91 | MF | (Italy) ITA | Andrea Bertolacci |
| -- | MF | (Germany) GER | Alexander Merkel |

== Main transfers and loans ==
=== Summer 2012 ===
==== In ====
| Name | Nationality | Moving from | Fee |
|---|---|---|---|
| Antonio Donnarumma | Italy | Milan | Undisclosed |
| Damiano Ferronetti | Italy | Torino | Free transfer |
| Massimo Bonanni | Italy | (Switzerland) Lugano | £1,232,000 |
| Ahmed Barusso | Ghana | Roma | Free transfer |
| Alexandros Tzorvas | Greece | Palermo | Undisclosed |
| Giammario Piscitella | Italy | Roma | £1,320,000 |
| Andrea Bertolacci | Italy | Roma | £1,056,000 |
| Michele Canini | Italy | Cagliari | £2,200,000 |
| Ciro Immobile | Italy | Juventus | £3,520,000 |
| Dániel Tőzsér | Hungary | (Belgium) Genk | Free transfer |

==== Out ====
| Name | Nationality | Moving to | Fee |
|---|---|---|---|
| Nenad Tomović | Montenegro | Fiorentina | £3,696,000 |
| Giandomenico Mesto | Italy | Napoli | £1,320,000 |
| Steve von Bergen | Switzerland | Palermo | £968,000 |
| Antonino Ragusa | Italy | Pescara | £1,320,000 |
| Dario Dainelli | Italy | Chievo | Free transfer |
| Panagiotis Tachtsidis | Greece | Roma | £2,200,000 |
| Richmond Boakye | Ghana | Juventus | £3,520,000 |
| Cristiano Lupatelli | Italy | Fiorentina | Free transfer |
| Isaac Cofie | Ghana | Chievo | Undisclosed |
| Miguel Veloso | Portugal | (Ukraine) Dynamo Kyiv | £6,600,000 |
| Rodrigo Palacio | Argentina | Internazionale | £9,240,000 |
| Andrea Caracciolo | Italy | Brescia | £176,000 |
| Louisse Parfait | Cameroon | Cesena | Undisclosed |
| Magnus Troest | Denmark | Varese | Undisclosed |
| Louisse Parfait | Cameroon | Cesena | Undisclosed |
| Alessio Scarpi | Cameroon | -- | Retired |

=== Winter 2012–13 ===
==== In ====
| Name | Nationality | Moving from | Fee |
|---|---|---|---|
| Thomas Manfredini | Italy | Atalanta | Undisclosed |
| Antonio Floro Flores | Italy | Udinese | Undisclosed |
| Francesco Acerbi | Italy | Milan | £3,520,000 |
| Daniele Portanova | Italy | Bologna | Undisclosed |
| Enis Nadarević | Serbia | Varese | £220,000 |
| Eros Pisano | Italy | Palermo | Undisclosed |
| Rubén Olivera | Uruguay | Fiorentina | Loan |

==== Out ====
| Name | Nationality | Moving to | Fee |
|---|---|---|---|
| Kévin Constant | Guinea | Milan | £3,520,000 |
| Lucas Pratto | Argentina | Vélez Sarsfield | £1,760,000 |
| Michele Canini | Italy | Atalanta | Undisclosed |
| Alexander Merkel | Germany | Udinese | Undisclosed |
| Francesco Acerbi | Italy | Chievo | Loan |

== Competitions ==
=== Serie A ===
==== League table ====
| Pos | Team | Pld | W | D | L | GF | GA | GD | Pts | Qualification or relegation |
|---|---|---|---|---|---|---|---|---|---|---|
| 15 | Atalanta | 38 | 11 | 9 | 18 | 39 | 56 | −17 | 40 (Note: Atalanta was docked 2 points due to involvement in the 2011–12 Italian football scandal.) | |
| 16 | Torino | 38 | 8 | 16 | 14 | 46 | 55 | −9 | 39 (Note: Sampdoria and Torino were docked 1 point due to involvement in the 2011–12 Italian football scandal.) | |
| 17 | Genoa | 38 | 8 | 14 | 16 | 38 | 52 | −14 | 38 | |
| 18 | Palermo (R) | 38 | 6 | 14 | 18 | 34 | 54 | −20 | 32 | Relegation to Serie B |
| 19 | Siena (R) | 38 | 9 | 9 | 20 | 36 | 57 | −21 | 30 (Note: Siena was docked 6 points due to involvement in the 2011–12 Italian football scandal.) | Relegation to Serie B |

Source: Serie A, Soccerway
Rules for classification: 1st points; 2nd head-to-head points; 3rd head-to-head goal difference; 4th goal difference; 5th number of goals scored; 6th public draw.
(Head-to-head record is applied for clubs with the same number of points only once all matches between said clubs have been played)
(R) Relegated

==== Results summary ====
| Overall | | | | | | | | Home | | | | | | Away | | | | | |
| Pld | W | D | L | GF | GA | GD | Pts | W | D | L | GF | GA | GD | W | D | L | GF | GA | GD |
|---|---|---|---|---|---|---|---|---|---|---|---|---|---|---|---|---|---|---|---|
| 38 | 8 | 14 | 16 | 38 | 52 | −14 | 38 | 5 | 7 | 7 | 26 | 30 | −4 | 3 | 7 | 9 | 12 | 22 | −10 |

Last updated: 19 May 2013.
Source: Competitive matches

==== Results by round ====
| Round | 1 | 2 | 3 | 4 | 5 | 6 | 7 | 8 | 9 | 10 | 11 | 12 | 13 | 14 | 15 | 16 | 17 | 18 | 19 | 20 | 21 | 22 | 23 | 24 | 25 | 26 | 27 | 28 | 29 | 30 | 31 | 32 | 33 | 34 | 35 | 36 | 37 | 38 |
|---|---|---|---|---|---|---|---|---|---|---|---|---|---|---|---|---|---|---|---|---|---|---|---|---|---|---|---|---|---|---|---|---|---|---|---|---|---|---|
| Ground | A | H | A | H | A | H | A | H | A | H | A | A | H | A | H | H | A | H | A | H | A | H | A | H | A | H | A | H | A | H | H | A | H | A | A | H | A | H |
| Result | W | L | L | W | D | D | D | L | L | L | L | L | L | W | L | L | D | D | W | L | L | D | W | D | W | D | L | L | L | D | L | D | D | W | W | D | D | D |
| Position | 4 | 8 | 12 | 9 | 10 | 10 | 10 | 11 | 16 | 17 | 18 | 19 | 20 | 17 | 19 | 20 | 20 | 20 | 17 | 18 | 19 | 19 | 18 | 18 | 18 | 18 | 18 | 18 | 18 | 18 | 19 | 19 | 19 | 19 | 18 | 17 | 17 | 17 |

Updated to match(es) played on 19 May 2013. Source: Competitive matches
A = Away; H = Home; W = Win; D = Draw; L = Loss

==== Matches ====
| 26 August 2012 1 | Genoa | 2–0 | Cagliari | Genoa |
| 20:45 CEST (UTC+02:00) | Merkel 51'; Immobile 85' | | | Stadium: Stadio Luigi Ferraris; Attendance: 17,236; Referee: Nicola Rizzoli |

| 2 September 2012 2 | Catania | 3–2 | Genoa | Catania |
| 20:45 CEST (UTC+02:00) | Bergessio 66', 68'; Lodi 84' | | Kucka 26'; Janković 82' | Stadium: Stadio Angelo Massimino; Attendance: 12,818; Referee: Antonio Giannoccaro |

| 16 September 2012 3 | Genoa | 1–3 | Juventus | Genoa |
| 15:00 CEST (UTC+02:00) | Immobile 18' | | Giaccherini 61'; Vučinić 78' (pen.); Asamoah 84' | Stadium: Stadio Luigi Ferraris; Attendance: 24,854; Referee: Gianluca Rocchi |

| 23 September 2012 4 | Lazio | 0–1 | Genoa | Rome |
| 20:45 CEST (UTC+02:00) | | | Borriello 79' | Stadium: Stadio Olimpico; Attendance: 32,446; Referee: Antonio Damato |

| 26 September 2012 5 | Genoa | 1–1 | Parma | Genoa |
| 20:45 CEST (UTC+02:00) | Borriello 88' (pen.) | | A. Lucarelli 27' | Stadium: Stadio Luigi Ferraris; Attendance: 17,511; Referee: Marco Guida |

| 30 September 2012 6 | Udinese | 0–0 | Genoa | Udine |
| 12:30 CEST (UTC+02:00) | | | | Stadium: Stadio Friuli; Attendance: 15,396; Referee: Andrea Romeo |

| 6 October 2012 7 | Genoa | 1–1 | Palermo | Genoa |
| 20:45 CEST (UTC+02:00) | Borriello 52' | | Giorgi 14' | Stadium: Stadio Luigi Ferraris; Attendance: 18,538; Referee: Dino Tommasi |

| 21 October 2012 8 | Genoa | 2–4 | Roma | Genoa |
| 20:45 CEST (UTC+02:00) | Kucka 7'; Janković 15' | | Totti 27'; Osvaldo 44', 55'; Lamela 83' | Stadium: Stadio Luigi Ferraris; Attendance: 19,254; Referee: Daniele Orsato |

| 27 October 2012 9 | Milan | 1–0 | Genoa | Milan |
| 20:45 CEST (UTC+02:00) | El Shaarawy 77' | | | Stadium: San Siro; Attendance: 33,046; Referee: Paolo Mazzoleni |

| 1 November 2012 10 | Genoa | 0–1 | Fiorentina | Genoa |
| 20:45 CET (UTC+01:00) | | | Pasqual 14' | Stadium: Stadio Luigi Ferraris; Attendance: 18,952; Referee: Luca Banti |

| 4 November 2012 11 | Siena | 1–0 | Genoa | Siena |
| 15:00 CET (UTC+01:00) | Paci 54' | | | Stadium: Stadio Artemio Franchi – Montepaschi Arena; Attendance: 8,076; Referee: Sebastiano Peruzzo |

| 11 November 2012 12 | Genoa | 2–4 | Napoli | Genoa |
| 15:00 CET (UTC+01:00) | Immobile 23'; Bertolacci 55' | | Mesto 54'; 79' Cavani; 90' Hamšík; 90+4' Insigne | Stadium: Stadio Luigi Ferraris; Attendance: 20,581; Referee: Nicola Rizzoli |

| 18 November 2012 13 | Sampdoria | 3–1 | Genoa | Genoa |
| 20:45 CET (UTC+01:00) | Poli 16'; Bovo 36' (o.g.); Icardi 88' | | Immobile 73' | Stadium: Stadio Luigi Ferraris; Attendance: 30,350; Referee: Paolo Mazzoleni |

| 25 November 2012 14 | Atalanta | 0–1 | Genoa | Bergamo |
| 15:00 CET (UTC+01:00) | | | Bertolacci 39' | Stadium: Stadio Atleti Azzurri d'Italia; Attendance: 14,166; Referee: Daniele Doveri |

| 2 December 2012 15 | Genoa | 2–4 | Chievo | Genoa |
| 15:00 CET (UTC+01:00) | Said 40'; Janković 56' | | Paloschi 14' (pen.), 22', 45+1'; Stoian 89' | Stadium: Stadio Luigi Ferraris; Attendance: 17,678; Referee: Paolo Tagliavento |

| 9 December 2012 16 | Pescara | 2–0 | Genoa | Pescara |
| 15:00 CET (UTC+01:00) | Abbruscato 52'; Vukušić 73' | | | Stadium: Stadio Adriatico; Attendance: 9,390; Referee: Domenico Celi |

| 16 December 2012 17 | Genoa | 1–1 | Torino | Genoa |
| 15:00 CET (UTC+01:00) | Granqvist 29' | | Bianchi 19' | Stadium: Stadio Luigi Ferraris; Attendance: 17,937; Referee: Daniele Orsato |

| 22 December 2012 18 | Internazionale | 1–1 | Genoa | Milan |
| 12:30 CET (UTC+01:00) | Cambiasso 85' | | Immobile 77' | Stadium: San Siro; Attendance: 40,695; Referee: Andrea Gervasoni |

| 6 January 2013 19 | Genoa | 2–0 | Bologna | Genoa |
| 15:00 CET (UTC+01:00) | Borriello 57', 73' | | | Stadium: Stadio Luigi Ferraris; Attendance: 18,090; Referee: Luca Banti |

| 13 January 2013 20 | Cagliari | 2–1 | Genoa | Quartu Sant'Elena |
| 15:00 CET (UTC+01:00) | Sau 55'; Conti 82' | | E. Pisano 48' | Stadium: Stadio Is Arenas; Attendance: 10,000; Referee: Gianluca Rocchi |

| 20 January 2013 21 | Genoa | 0–2 | Catania | Genoa |
| 15:00 CET (UTC+01:00) | | | Bergessio 4'; Barrientos 86' | Stadium: Stadio Luigi Ferraris; Attendance: 17,317; Referee: Nicola Rizzoli |

| 26 January 2013 22 | Juventus | 1–1 | Genoa | Turin |
| 20:45 CET (UTC+01:00) | Quagliarella 54' | | Borriello 68' | Stadium: Juventus Stadium; Attendance: 36,668; Referee: Marco Guida |

| 3 February 2013 23 | Genoa | 3–2 | Lazio | Genoa |
| 15:00 CET (UTC+01:00) | Borriello 16'; Bertolacci 22'; Rigoni 90+5' | | Floccari 58'; Mauri 82' (pen.) | Stadium: Stadio Luigi Ferraris; Attendance: 18,416; Referee: Paolo Tagliavento |

| 10 February 2013 24 | Parma | 0–0 | Genoa | Parma |
| 12:30 CET (UTC+01:00) | | | | Stadium: Stadio Ennio Tardini; Attendance: 10,944; Referee: Sebastiano Peruzzo |

| 17 February 2013 25 | Genoa | 1–0 | Udinese | Genoa |
| 15:00 CET (UTC+01:00) | Kucka 33' | | | Stadium: Stadio Luigi Ferraris; Attendance: 18,355; Referee: Daniele Doveri |

| 23 February 2013 26 | Palermo | 0–0 | Genoa | Palermo |
| 20:45 CET (UTC+01:00) | | | | Stadium: Stadio Renzo Barbera; Attendance: 18,995; Referee: Daniele Orsato |

{{football box collapsible |round = 27 |date = 3 March 2013 |time = 20:45 CET (UTC+01:00) |team1 = Roma |score = 3–1 |report = |team2 = Genoa |goals1 = Totti 16' (pen.)
[[Alessio Romagnoli|Romagnoli]] 58'
Perrotta 88' |goals2 = Borriello 42' (pen.) |stadium = Stadio Olimpico |location = Rome |attendance = 35,568 |referee = Andrea Gervasoni |result = L }}

| 8 March 2013 28 | Genoa | 0–2 | Milan | Genoa |
| 15:00 CET (UTC+01:00) | | | Pazzini 22'; Balotelli 60' | Stadium: Stadio Luigi Ferraris; Attendance: 21,584; Referee: Antonio Damato |

| 17 March 2013 29 | Fiorentina | 3–2 | Genoa | Florence |
| 15:00 CET (UTC+01:00) | Aquilani 33'; Cuadrado 62'; Cassani 77' (o.g.) | | Portanova 58'; Antonelli 69' | Stadium: Stadio Artemio Franchi; Attendance: 21,319; Referee: Nicola Rizzoli |

| 30 March 2013 30 | Genoa | 2–2 | Siena | Genoa |
| 15:00 CET (UTC+01:00) | Borriello 6'; Janković 71' | | Emeghara 43'; Rosina 52' (pen.) | Stadium: Stadio Luigi Ferraris; Attendance: 19,613; Referee: Gianluca Rocchi |

| 7 April 2013 31 | Napoli | 2–0 | Genoa | Naples |
| 20:45 CEST (UTC+02:00) | Pandev 18'; Džemaili 29' | | | Stadium: Stadio San Paolo; Attendance: 34,376; Referee: Luca Banti |

| 14 April 2013 32 | Genoa | 1–1 | Sampdoria | Genoa |
| 15:00 CEST (UTC+02:00) | Matuzalém 80' | | Éder 28' | Stadium: Stadio Luigi Ferraris; Attendance: 29,218; Referee: Daniele Orsato |

| 20 April 2013 33 | Genoa | 1–1 | Atalanta | Genoa |
| 18:00 CEST (UTC+02:00) | Floro Flores 6' | | Del Grosso 8' | Stadium: Stadio Luigi Ferraris; Attendance: 18,465; Referee: Antonio Giannoccaro |

| 28 April 2013 34 | Chievo | 0–1 | Genoa | Verona |
| 15:00 CEST (UTC+02:00) | | | Borriello 73' | Stadium: Stadio Marcantonio Bentegodi; Attendance: 9,000; Referee: Daniele Doveri |

| 5 May 2013 35 | Genoa | 4–1 | Pescara | Genoa |
| 15:00 CEST (UTC+02:00) | Floro Flores 19'; Borriello 30', 54'; Bertolacci 70' | | Sculli 35' | Stadium: Stadio Luigi Ferraris; Attendance: 18,855; Referee: Andrea Gervasoni |

| 8 May 2013 36 | Torino | 0–0 | Genoa | Turin |
| 15:00 CEST (UTC+02:00) | | | | Stadium: Stadio Olimpico di Torino; Attendance: 20,039; Referee: Gianluca Rocchi |

| 12 May 2013 37 | Genoa | 0–0 | Internazionale | Genoa |
| 12:30 CEST (UTC+02:00) | | | | Stadium: Stadio Luigi Ferraris; Attendance: 22,603; Referee: Paolo Tagliavento |

| 19 May 2013 38 | Bologna | 0–0 | Genoa | Bologna |
| 15:00 CEST (UTC+02:00) | | | | Stadium: Stadio Renato Dall'Ara; Attendance: 21,858; Referee: Gennaro Borriello |

=== Coppa Italia ===
| 18 August 2012 Third round | Genoa | 1–1 (a.e.t.) (1–4 p) | Hellas Verona | Genoa |
| 20:45 CEST (UTC+02:00) | Mesto 32' | | Bjelanović 65' | Stadium: Stadio Luigi Ferraris; Attendance: 8,000; Referee: Luca Banti |
| | Penalties |
| | Janković (penalty missed); Immobile (penalty missed); Canini (penalty scored) | | (penalty scored) Bačinović; (penalty scored) Jorginho; (penalty scored) Laner; (penalty scored) Maietta |

== Statistics ==
=== Appearances and goals ===
| No. | Pos | Nat | Player | Total | | Serie A | | Coppa Italia | |
| No. | Pos | Nat | Player | Apps | Goals | Apps | Goals | Apps | Goals |
Goalkeepers
| 1 | GK | (France) FRA | Sébastien Frey | 37 | 0 | 36 | 0 | 1 | 0 |
| 30 | GK | (Greece) GRE | Alexandros Tzorvas | 1 | 0 | 1 | 0 | 0 | 0 |
| 32 | GK | (Italy) ITA | Antonio Donnarumma | 1 | 0 | 1 | 0 | 0 | 0 |
Defenders
| 3 | DF | (Italy) ITA | Cesare Bovo | 13 | 0 | 12+1 | 0 | 0 | 0 |
| 4 | DF | (Italy) ITA | Damiano Ferronetti | 4 | 0 | 0+4 | 0 | 0 | 0 |
| 5 | DF | (Sweden) SWE | Andreas Granqvist | 36 | 1 | 32+3 | 1 | 0+1 | 0 |
| 13 | DF | (Italy) ITA | Luca Antonelli | 34 | 1 | 32+1 | 1 | 1 | 0 |
| 15 | DF | (Slovenia) SVN | Luka Krajnc | 3 | 0 | 1+2 | 0 | 0 | 0 |
| 21 | DF | (Italy) ITA | Thomas Manfredini | 14 | 0 | 14 | 0 | 0 | 0 |
| 24 | DF | (Italy) ITA | Emiliano Moretti | 34 | 0 | 26+7 | 0 | 0+1 | 0 |
| 26 | DF | (Italy) ITA | Mattia Cassani | 5 | 0 | 3+2 | 0 | 0 | 0 |
| 31 | DF | (Italy) ITA | Mario Sampirisi | 16 | 0 | 16 | 0 | 0 | 0 |
| 87 | DF | (Italy) ITA | Eros Pisano | 10 | 1 | 9+1 | 1 | 0 | 0 |
| 91 | DF | (Italy) ITA | Daniele Portanova | 15 | 1 | 15 | 1 | 0 | 0 |
Midfielders
| 7 | MF | (Italy) ITA | Marco Rossi | 15 | 0 | 7+7 | 0 | 1 | 0 |
| 8 | MF | (Peru) PER | Juan Manuel Vargas | 20 | 0 | 15+5 | 0 | 0 | 0 |
| 10 | MF | (Uruguay) URU | Ruben Olivera | 5 | 0 | 2+3 | 0 | 0 | 0 |
| 14 | MF | (Italy) ITA | Marco Rigoni | 13 | 1 | 7+6 | 1 | 0 | 0 |
| 19 | MF | (Chile) CHI | Cristóbal Jorquera | 13 | 0 | 4+9 | 0 | 0 | 0 |
| 27 | MF | (Brazil) BRA | Matuzalém | 15 | 1 | 15 | 1 | 0 | 0 |
| 28 | MF | (Hungary) HUN | Dániel Tőzsér | 22 | 0 | 16+6 | 0 | 0 | 0 |
| 29 | MF | (Bosnia and Herzegovina) BIH | Enis Nadarević | 3 | 0 | 0+3 | 0 | 0 | 0 |
| 33 | MF | (Slovakia) SVK | Juraj Kucka | 33 | 3 | 32+1 | 3 | 0 | 0 |
| 91 | MF | (Italy) ITA | Andrea Bertolacci | 29 | 4 | 24+5 | 4 | 0 | 0 |
Forwards
| 11 | FW | (Serbia) SRB | Bosko Jankovic | 20 | 4 | 16+3 | 4 | 1 | 0 |
| 16 | FW | (Sweden) SWE | Linus Hallenius | 1 | 0 | 1 | 0 | 0 | 0 |
| 17 | FW | (Italy) ITA | Ciro Immobile | 34 | 5 | 21+12 | 5 | 1 | 0 |
| 22 | FW | (Italy) ITA | Marco Borriello | 28 | 12 | 26+2 | 12 | 0 | 0 |
| 23 | FW | (Italy) ITA | Ahmed Said | 5 | 1 | 0+5 | 1 | 0 | 0 |
| 83 | FW | (Italy) ITA | Antonio Floro Flores | 11 | 2 | 6+5 | 2 | 0 | 0 |
Players transferred out during the season
| 10 | MF | (Germany) GER | Alexander Merkel | 7 | 1 | 4+2 | 1 | 1 | 0 |
| 14 | MF | (Chile) CHI | Felipe Seymour | 16 | 0 | 8+7 | 0 | 1 | 0 |
| 20 | DF | (Italy) ITA | Giandomenico Mesto | 2 | 1 | 1 | 0 | 1 | 1 |
| 21 | DF | (Italy) ITA | Michele Canini | 15 | 0 | 14 | 0 | 1 | 0 |

Last updated: 28 October 2012
Source: Competitions

=== Goal scorers ===
12 goals

- (Italy) Marco Borriello

5 goals

- (Italy) Ciro Immobile

4 goals

- (Serbia) Boško Janković
- (Italy) Andrea Bertolacci

3 goals

- (Slovakia) Juraj Kucka

2 goals

- (Italy) Antonio Floro Flores

1 goal

- (Italy) Marco Rigoni
- (Italy) Daniele Portanova
- (Germany) Alexander Merkel
- (Sweden) Andreas Granqvist
- (Brazil) Matuzalém
- (Brazil) Luca Antonelli
- (Italy) Eros Pisano
- (Italy) Said Ahmed Said
