= Marchiori =

Marchiori is an Italian surname. Notable people with the surname include:

- Alberto Marchiori (born 1993), Italian footballer
- Domenico Marchiori (1828–1905), Italian painter
- Fernando Marchiori (born 1979), Brazilian footballer and manager
- Leo Marchiori (1898–1949), Canadian cyclist
- Massimo Marchiori (born 1970), Italian mathematician and computer scientist
- Tomás Marchiori (born 1995), Argentine footballer
- Val Marchiori (born 1974), Brazilian businesswoman
