= Alfredo Bordonali =

Italian footballer (born 1919)

Personal information
- Date of birth: 4 December 1919
- Place of birth: Palermo, Kingdom of Italy
- Position: Midfielder

Senior career*
Years	Team	Apps	(Gls)
1946–1947	Roma	4	(0)
1950–1952	Colleferro		
- * Club domestic league appearances and goals

Alfredo Bordonali (born 4 December 1919) was an Italian professional football player.

He spent one season in the Serie A with A.S. Roma. He also played for B.P.D. Colleferro in Serie C.
