= 2019–20 AC Milan season =

Milan
2019–20 season
- Chairman: Paolo Scaroni
- Head Coach: Marco Giampaolo (until 8 October); Stefano Pioli (from 9 October)
- Stadium: San Siro
- Serie A: 6th
- Coppa Italia: Semi-finals
- Top goalscorer: League: Ante Rebić (11); All: Ante Rebić (12)
| Home colours | Away colours | Third colours |

The 2019–20 season was the 121st season in Associazione Calcio Milan's history and their 86th (109th overall) in the top-flight of Italian football. Milan competed in Serie A and in the Coppa Italia. Milan would have also qualified for the UEFA Europa League but was later excluded due to financial fair play issues.

== Facts and events ==
On 28 May 2019, head coach Gennaro Gattuso announced he would be leaving the club despite being under contract until 2021. On the same day, also sporting director Leonardo announced his resignation.

New society layout was defined on 14 June when iconic former players Paolo Maldini and Zvonimir Boban signed respectively as technical director and technical support. On following 19 June Marco Giampaolo was signed as coach, while 2 days later Frederic Massara signed as sporting director

On 28 June 2019, Milan have been excluded from the 2019–20 UEFA Europa League as a result of Financial Fair Play breaches.

On 8 October 2019, Milan dismissed coach Marco Giampaolo (due to poor results) after only 3 months of employment. On the following day, Stefano Pioli was announced as his substitute.

On 7 March 2020, it was announced that the contract with the club's "Chief Football Officer" Zvonimir Boban had been terminated. A week prior to his dismissal, Boban was interviewed by La Gazzetta dello Sport and criticized the club's CEO Ivan Gazidis over rumors involving him signing a secret pre-contract deal with football manager Ralf Rangnick for the following season. After Boban's dismissal was officialized, the club's chairman Paolo Scaroni stated his support of Gazidis. However, on 21 July 2020, the contract with current coach Stefano Pioli was extended until conclusion of the 2021/22 season.

== Players ==
=== Squad information ===
As of 30 August 2020.

| No. | Player | Nat. | Position(s) | Date of birth (age) | Signed in | Contract ends | Signed from | Transfer fee | Notes | Apps | Goals |
Goalkeepers
| 1 | Asmir Begović | (Bosnia and Herzegovina) | GK | 20 June 1987 (aged 33) | 2020 | 2020 | (England) Bournemouth | Free | | 2 | 0 |
| 90 | Antonio Donnarumma | (Italy) | GK | 7 July 1990 (aged 30) | 2017 | 2021 | (Greece) Asteras Tripolis | €300,000 | From Youth system | 3 | 0 |
| 99 | Gianluigi Donnarumma | (Italy) | GK | 25 February 1999 (aged 21) | 2015 | 2021 | (Italy) Milan Primavera | Free | From Youth system | 203 | 0 |
Defenders
| 2 | Davide Calabria | (Italy) | RB / LB | 6 December 1996 (aged 23) | 2015 | 2022 | (Italy) Milan Primavera | Free | From Youth system | 112 | 3 |
| 12 | Andrea Conti | (Italy) | RB / RM | 2 March 1994 (aged 26) | 2017 | 2022 | (Italy) Atalanta | €24,000,000 | | 46 | 0 |
| 13 | Alessio Romagnoli | (Italy) | CB / LB | 12 January 1995 (aged 25) | 2015 | 2022 | (Italy) Roma | €25,000,000 | Captain | 192 | 8 |
| 19 | Théo Hernandez | (France) | LB / LM | 6 October 1997 (aged 22) | 2019 | 2024 | (Spain) Real Madrid | €20,000,000 | | 36 | 7 |
| 22 | Mateo Musacchio | (Argentina) | CB | 26 August 1990 (aged 30) | 2017 | 2021 | (Spain) Villarreal | €18,000,000 | | 73 | 2 |
| 24 | Simon Kjær | (Denmark) | CB | 26 March 1989 (aged 31) | 2020 | 2020 | (Spain) Sevilla | Free | | 19 | 0 |
| 43 | Léo Duarte | (Brazil) | CB / RB | 17 July 1996 (aged 24) | 2019 | 2024 | (Brazil) Flamengo | €10,000,000 | | 6 | 0 |
| 46 | Matteo Gabbia | (Italy) | CB / DM | 21 October 1999 (aged 20) | 2017 | 2023 | (Italy) Milan Primavera | Free | From Youth system | 11 | 0 |
| 93 | Diego Laxalt | (Uruguay) | LB / LM | 7 February 1993 (aged 27) | 2018 | 2022 | (Italy) Genoa | €14,000,000 | | 35 | 0 |
Midfielders
| 4 | Ismaël Bennacer | (Algeria) | DM / CM | 1 December 1997 (aged 22) | 2019 | 2024 | (Italy) Empoli | €16,000,000 | | 35 | 1 |
| 5 | Giacomo Bonaventura | (Italy) | CM / LW | 22 August 1989 (aged 31) | 2014 | 2020 | (Italy) Atalanta | €7,000,000 | | 184 | 35 |
| 20 | Lucas Biglia | (Argentina) | DM / CM | 30 January 1986 (aged 34) | 2017 | 2020 | (Italy) Lazio | €17,000,000 | | 70 | 2 |
| 33 | Rade Krunić | (Bosnia and Herzegovina) | CM / AM | 7 October 1993 (aged 26) | 2019 | 2024 | (Italy) Empoli | €8,000,000 | | 18 | 0 |
| 39 | Lucas Paquetá | (Brazil) | CM / AM | 27 August 1997 (aged 23) | 2018 | 2023 | (Brazil) Flamengo | €35,000,000 | | 44 | 1 |
| 79 | Franck Kessié | (Ivory Coast) | CM / DM | 19 December 1996 (aged 23) | 2017 | 2022 | (Italy) Atalanta | €28,000,000 | | 134 | 16 |
| 98 | Daniel Maldini | (Italy) | LW / AM | 11 October 2001 (aged 18) | 2020 | 2024 | (Italy) Milan Primavera | Free | From Youth system | 2 | 0 |
Forwards
| 7 | Samu Castillejo | (Spain) | RW / SS | 18 January 1995 (aged 25) | 2018 | 2023 | (Spain) Villarreal | €25,000,000 | | 65 | 7 |
| 10 | Hakan Çalhanoğlu | (Turkey) | LW / AM | 8 February 1994 (aged 26) | 2017 | 2021 | (Germany) Bayer Leverkusen | €20,000,000 | | 129 | 23 |
| 17 | Rafael Leão | (Portugal) | ST / LW | 10 June 1999 (aged 21) | 2019 | 2024 | (France) Lille | €28,000,000 | | 33 | 6 |
| 18 | Ante Rebić | (Croatia) | LW / ST | 21 September 1993 (aged 26) | 2019 | 2021 | (Germany) Eintracht Frankfurt | Loan | | 30 | 12 |
| 21 | Zlatan Ibrahimović | (Sweden) | ST | 3 October 1981 (aged 38) | 2020 | 2020 | (United States) LA Galaxy | Free | | 105 | 67 |
| 56 | Alexis Saelemaekers | (Belgium) | RW / RB | 27 June 1999 (aged 21) | 2020 | 2020 | (Belgium) Anderlecht | €3,500,000 | | 15 | 1 |

== Transfers ==
=== Summer window ===
==== In ====
| Date | Pos. | Player | A. | Moving from | Fee | Notes | S. |
|---|---|---|---|---|---|---|---|
| 1 July 2019 | MF | (Ivory Coast) Franck Kessié | 22 | (Italy) Atalanta | €20,000,000 | Obligation to buy | |
| 4 July 2019 | DF | (Denmark) Andreas Jungdal | 17 | (Denmark) Vejle Boldklub | €800,000 | Joined Primavera team | |
| 5 July 2019 | DF | (France) Théo Hernandez | 21 | (Spain) Real Madrid | €20,000,000 | | |
| 8 July 2019 | MF | (Bosnia and Herzegovina) Rade Krunić | 25 | (Italy) Empoli | €8,000,000 | | |
| 31 July 2019 | FW | (Portugal) Rafael Leão | 20 | (France) Lille | €28,000,000 | | |
| 3 August 2019 | MF | (Algeria) Ismaël Bennacer | 21 | (Italy) Empoli | €16,000,000 | | |
| 8 August 2019 | DF | (Brazil) Léo Duarte | 23 | (Brazil) Flamengo | €10,000,000 | | |
| 19 August 2019 | FW | (Brazil) (Italy) Luan Capanni | 19 | (Italy) Lazio | Free | Joined Primavera team | |

==== On loan ====
| Date | Pos. | Player | A. | Moving from | Fee | Notes | S. |
|---|---|---|---|---|---|---|---|
| 2 September 2019 | FW | (Croatia) Ante Rebić | 25 | (Germany) Eintracht Frankfurt | Undisclosed | 2 Years loan | |

==== Loan returns ====
| Date | Pos. | Player | A. | Moving from | Fee | Notes | S. |
|---|---|---|---|---|---|---|---|
| 1 July 2019 | GK | (Italy) Christian Cavaliere | 19 | (Italy) Monza | Free | Re-joined Primavera team | |
| 1 July 2019 | DF | (Italy) Matteo Gabbia | 19 | (Italy) Lucchese | Free | | |

Total spending: ▼€111,8M

==== Out ====
| Date | Pos. | Player | A. | Moving to | Fee | Notes | S. |
|---|---|---|---|---|---|---|---|
| 1 July 2019 | DF | (Italy) Ignazio Abate | 32 | Unattached | Free | End of contract | |
| 1 July 2019 | MF | (Italy) Riccardo Montolivo | 34 | Retired | Free | End of contract | |
| 1 July 2019 | MF | (Italy) Andrea Bertolacci | 28 | (Italy) Sampdoria | Free | End of contract | |
| 1 July 2019 | MF | (Italy) (Argentina) José Mauri | 23 | (Argentina) Talleres | Free | End of contract | |
| 1 July 2019 | DF | (Colombia) Cristián Zapata | 32 | (Italy) Genoa | Free | End of contract | |
| 1 July 2019 | MF | (Italy) Manuel Locatelli | 21 | (Italy) Sassuolo | €10,000,000 | Obligation to buy | |
| 1 July 2019 | DF | (Czech Republic) Stefan Simić | 24 | (Croatia) Hajduk Split | Free | After return from loan | |
| 18 July 2019 | DF | (Italy) Gian Filippo Felicioli | 21 | (Italy) Venezia | Undisclosed | After return from loan | |
| 22 July 2019 | DF | (Italy) (Spain) Andrés Llamas | 21 | (Italy) Pistoiese | Free | From loan to definitive purchase | |
| 30 July 2019 | FW | (Italy) Patrick Cutrone | 21 | (England) Wolverhampton | €18,000,000 | Plus €4,000,000 bonuses | |
| 31 July 2019 | DF | (Portugal) Tiago Djaló | 19 | (France) Lille | €5,000,000 | From Primavera team | |
| 26 August 2019 | DF | (Croatia) Ivan Strinić | 32 | Unattached | Free | Contract termination | |
| 28 August 2019 | FW | (Portugal) Tiago Dias | 21 | (Portugal) Famalicão | Undisclosed | After return from loan | |
| 29 August 2019 | FW | (Italy) Vittorio Vigolo | 19 | (Italy) Rende | Undisclosed | After return from loan | |
| 2 September 2019 | MF | (Poland) Przemysław Bargiel | 19 | (Poland) Śląsk Wrocław | Free | After return from loan | |
| 2 September 2019 | GK | (Belgium) (Italy) Lillo Guarneri | 17 | (Belgium) Mouscron | Undisclosed | From Primavera team | |
| 2 September 2019 | DF | (Italy) Edoardo Brusa | 18 | (Italy) Monza | Undisclosed | From loan to definitive purchase | |
| 2 September 2019 | DF | (Italy) Nicola Viganò | 17 | (Italy) AlbinoLeffe | Undisclosed | From loan to definitive purchase | |
| 2 September 2019 | MF | (Belgium) Alexandro Cavagnera | 20 | Unattached | Free | After return from loan | |

==== Loans ended ====
| Date | Pos. | Player | A. | Moving to | Fee | Notes | S. |
|---|---|---|---|---|---|---|---|
| 1 July 2019 | DF | (Italy) Raoul Bellanova | 19 | (France) Bordeaux | Free | From Primavera team | |
| 1 July 2019 | MF | (France) Tiémoué Bakayoko | 24 | (England) Chelsea | Free | | |

==== Loans out ====
| Date | Pos. | Player | A. | Moving to | Fee | Notes | S. |
|---|---|---|---|---|---|---|---|
| 6 July 2019 | DF | (Paraguay) Gustavo Gomez | 26 | (Brazil) Palmeiras | €1,500,000 | Loan with obligation to buy (€3,000,000) | |
| 10 July 2019 | DF | (Italy) Gabriele Bellodi | 18 | (Italy) Crotone | Free | After return from loan | |
| 15 July 2019 | MF | (Italy) Tommaso Pobega | 20 | (Italy) Pordenone | Free | After return from loan | |
| 25 July 2019 | FW | (Kosovo) Ismet Sinani | 20 | (Italy) Sicula Leonzio | Free | After return from loan | |
| 1 August 2019 | GK | (Italy) Alessandro Plizzari | 19 | (Italy) Livorno | Free | | |
| 20 August 2019 | FW | (Italy) Riccardo Forte | 20 | (Italy) Piacenza | Free | After return from loan | |
| 29 August 2019 | FW | (Italy) (Cameroon) Frank Tsadjout | 20 | (Belgium) Charleroi | Free | From Primavera team | |
| 29 August 2019 | MF | (Croatia) Emir Murati | 19 | (Italy) Rende | Free | After return from loan | |
| 30 August 2019 | FW | (Italy) Gabriele Capanni | 18 | (Italy) Novara | Free | From Primavera team | |
| 31 August 2019 | DF | (Uruguay) Diego Laxalt | 26 | (Italy) Torino | €500,000 | Loan with option to buy (€11,5M) | |
| 2 September 2019 | FW | (Portugal) André Silva | 23 | (Germany) Eintracht Frankfurt | Undisclosed | 2 Years loan | |
| 2 September 2019 | FW | (Croatia) Alen Halilović | 23 | (Netherlands) Heerenveen | Free | After anticipated return from loan | |

Total income: ▲€35,5M

=== Winter window ===
Deals officialised beforehand were effective starting from 2 January 2020.

==== In ====
| Date | Pos. | Player | A. | Moving from | Fee | Notes | S. |
|---|---|---|---|---|---|---|---|
| 27 December 2019 | FW | (Sweden) Zlatan Ibrahimović | 38 | Unattached | Free | | |
| 31 January 2020 | MF | (Italy) Francesco Angelini | 17 | (Italy) Rimini | Undisclosed | Joined Primavera team | |

==== Loans in ====
| Date | Pos. | Player | A. | Moving from | Fee | Notes | S. |
|---|---|---|---|---|---|---|---|
| 13 January 2020 | DF | (Denmark) Simon Kjær | 30 | (Spain) Sevilla | Free | With option to buy | |
| 13 January 2020 | GK | (Bosnia and Herzegovina) Asmir Begović | 32 | (England) Bournemouth | Free | | |
| 31 January 2020 | MF | (Belgium) Alexis Saelemaekers | 20 | (Belgium) Anderlecht | €3,500,000 | With option to buy | |

==== Loan returns ====
| Date | Pos. | Player | A. | Moving from | Fee | Notes | S. |
|---|---|---|---|---|---|---|---|
| 31 January 2020 | DF | (Uruguay) Diego Laxalt | 26 | (Italy) Torino | Free | Anticipated return from loan | |

Total spending: ▼€3,5M

==== Out ====
| Date | Pos. | Player | A. | Moving to | Fee | Notes | S. |
|---|---|---|---|---|---|---|---|
| 2 January 2020 | DF | (Paraguay) Gustavo Gomez | 26 | (Brazil) Palmeiras | €3,000,000 | From loan to definitive purchase | |
| 14 January 2020 | FW | (Italy) Fabio Borini | 28 | (Italy) Hellas Verona | Free | | |
| 30 January 2020 | FW | (Poland) Krzysztof Piątek | 24 | (Germany) Hertha BSC | €27,000,000 | | |
| 31 January 2020 | FW | (Italy) Alessandro Negri | 19 | (Italy) Rende | Undisclosed | From Primavera squad | |

==== Loans out ====
| Date | Pos. | Player | A. | Moving to | Fee | Notes | S. |
|---|---|---|---|---|---|---|---|
| 12 January 2020 | DF | (Italy) Mattia Caldara | 25 | (Italy) Atalanta | Free | 18 months loan with option to buy | |
| 13 January 2020 | GK | (Spain) Pepe Reina | 37 | (England) Aston Villa | Free | | |
| 16 January 2020 | FW | (Italy) Riccardo Forte | 20 | (Italy) Lecco | Free | After anticipated return from loan | |
| 29 January 2020 | MF | (Spain) Suso | 26 | (Spain) Sevilla | Undisclosed | 18 months loan with option to buy | |
| 30 January 2020 | DF | (Switzerland) Ricardo Rodriguez | 27 | (Netherlands) PSV Eindhoven | Free | | |
| 31 January 2020 | FW | (Italy) Gabriele Capanni | 19 | (Italy) Catania | Free | After anticipated return from loan | |
| 5 February 2020 | DF | (France) (Cameroon) Leroy Abanda | 19 | (Switzerland) Neuchâtel Xamax | Free | From Primavera team | |

Total income:▲€30M

== Pre-season and friendlies ==
=== International Champions Cup ===
| 24 July 2019 ICC | Bayern Munich | 1–0 | Milan | Kansas City, United States |
| 20:00 CDT (UTC−5) | Goretzka 45+3' | Report | Çalhanoğlu (yellow card) 49' | Stadium: Children's Mercy Park; Attendance: 18,467; Referee: Allen Chapman (United States) |

| 28 July 2019 ICC | Milan | 0–1 | Benfica | Foxborough, United States |
| 15:00 EDT (UTC−4) | Musacchio (yellow card) 38' | Report | Pizzi (yellow card) 38'; Fejsa (yellow card) 65'; Taarabt 70' | Stadium: Gillette Stadium; Attendance: 27,565; Referee: Sorin Stoica (United States) |

| 3 August 2019 ICC | Manchester United | 2–2 (5–4 p) | Milan | Cardiff, Wales |
| 17:30 BST (UTC+1) | Rashford 14'; Lingard 72'; Fred (yellow card) 73' | Report | Suso 26'; Lindelöf 60' (o.g.); Çalhanoğlu (yellow card) 90' | Stadium: Principality Stadium; Attendance: 65,892; Referee: Iwan Griffith (Wales) |
| | Penalties |
| | Lingard (penalty scored); Young (penalty scored); Greenwood (penalty scored); Gomes (penalty scored); James (penalty scored) | | (penalty scored) Çalhanoğlu; (penalty scored) Bonaventura; (penalty scored) Silva; (penalty scored) Krunić; (penalty missed) Maldini |

=== Friendlies ===
| 19 July 2019 | Milan | 1–1 | Novara | Carnago, Italy |
| 11:00 CEST (UTC+2) | Hernandez 80' | Report | Stoppa 60' | Stadium: Milanello |

| 10 August 2019 | Feronikeli | 0–2 | Milan | Pristina, Kosovo |
| 20:45 CEST (UTC+2) | | Report | Suso 26'; Borini 57' | Stadium: Fadil Vokrri Stadium; Attendance: 4,000; Referee: Genc Nuza (Kosovo) |

| 17 August 2019 | Cesena | 0–0 | Milan | Cesena, Italy |
| 20:30 CEST (UTC+2) | Valeri (yellow card) 23'; Franchini (yellow card) 83' | Report | | Stadium: Orogel Stadium; Attendance: 14,797; Referee: Marco D'Ascanio (Italy) |

== Competitions ==
=== Serie A ===
==== League table ====
| Pos | Team | Pld | W | D | L | GF | GA | GD | Pts | Qualification or relegation |
|---|---|---|---|---|---|---|---|---|---|---|
| 4 | Lazio | 38 | 24 | 6 | 8 | 79 | 42 | +37 | 78 (Note: Atalanta finished ahead of Lazio on head-to-head points: Lazio 3–3 Atalanta, Atalanta 3–2 Lazio.) | Qualification for the Champions League group stage |
| 5 | Roma | 38 | 21 | 7 | 10 | 77 | 51 | +26 | 70 | Qualification for the Europa League group stage |
| 6 | Milan | 38 | 19 | 9 | 10 | 63 | 46 | +17 | 66 | Qualification for the Europa League second qualifying round |
| 7 | Napoli | 38 | 18 | 8 | 12 | 61 | 50 | +11 | 62 | Qualification for the Europa League group stage (Note: Napoli qualified for the Europa League group stage by winning the 2019–20 Coppa Italia.) |
| 8 | Sassuolo | 38 | 14 | 9 | 15 | 69 | 63 | +6 | 51 | |

Source: Serie A, Soccerway
Rules for classification: 1) Points; 2) Head-to-head points; 3) Head-to-head goal difference; 4) Goal difference; 5) Goals scored; 6) Draw. (Note: Head-to-head record is used only after all the matches between the teams in question have been played)

==== Results summary ====
| Overall | | | | | | | | Home | | | | | | Away | | | | | |
| Pld | W | D | L | GF | GA | GD | Pts | W | D | L | GF | GA | GD | W | D | L | GF | GA | GD |
|---|---|---|---|---|---|---|---|---|---|---|---|---|---|---|---|---|---|---|---|
| 38 | 19 | 9 | 10 | 63 | 46 | +17 | 66 | 9 | 6 | 4 | 31 | 20 | +11 | 10 | 3 | 6 | 32 | 26 | +6 |

Last updated: 1 August 2020.
Source: Competitive matches

==== Results by round ====
| Round | 1 | 2 | 3 | 4 | 5 | 6 | 7 | 8 | 9 | 10 | 11 | 12 | 13 | 14 | 15 | 16 | 17 | 18 | 19 | 20 | 21 | 22 | 23 | 24 | 25 | 26 | 27 | 28 | 29 | 30 | 31 | 32 | 33 | 34 | 35 | 36 | 37 | 38 |
|---|---|---|---|---|---|---|---|---|---|---|---|---|---|---|---|---|---|---|---|---|---|---|---|---|---|---|---|---|---|---|---|---|---|---|---|---|---|---|
| Ground | A | H | A | H | A | H | A | H | A | H | H | A | H | A | A | H | A | H | A | H | A | H | A | H | A | H | A | H | A | A | H | A | H | H | A | H | A | H |
| Result | L | W | W | L | L | L | W | D | L | W | L | L | D | W | W | D | L | D | W | W | W | D | L | W | D | L | W | W | D | W | W | D | W | W | W | D | W | W |
| Position | 17 | 13 | 7 | 9 | 13 | 16 | 13 | 12 | 12 | 10 | 11 | 14 | 12 | 11 | 10 | 10 | 11 | 12 | 10 | 8 | 8 | 8 | 10 | 8 | 7 | 7 | 8 | 7 | 7 | 7 | 7 | 7 | 7 | 7 | 6 | 6 | 6 | 6 |

Updated to match(es) played on 1 August 2020. Source: Competitive matches
A = Away; H = Home; W = Win; D = Draw; L = Loss

==== Matches ====
| 25 August 2019 1 | Udinese | 1–0 | Milan | Udine |
| 18:00 CEST (UTC+02:00) | Jajalo (yellow card) 45+5'; Becão 72' | Report | Paquetá (yellow card) 21'; Çalhanoğlu (yellow card) 34'; Borini (yellow card) 44' | Stadium: Stadio Friuli; Attendance: 24,584; Referee: Fabrizio Pasqua |

| 31 August 2019 2 | Milan | 1–0 | Brescia | Milan |
| 18:00 CEST (UTC+02:00) | Çalhanoğlu 12', (yellow card) 65'; Silva (yellow card) 34'; Calabria (yellow card) 55' | Report | Dessena (yellow card) 24'; Cistana (yellow card) 30'; Bisoli (yellow card) 39'; Tonali (yellow card) 90+3' | Stadium: San Siro; Attendance: 56,691; Referee: Rosario Abisso |

| 15 September 2019 3 | Hellas Verona | 0–1 | Milan | Verona |
| 20:45 CEST (UTC+02:00) | Stępiński (red card) 21'; Veloso (yellow card) 40'; Günter (yellow card) 65'; Amrabat (yellow card) 74'; Silvestri (yellow card) 85' | Report | Piątek (yellow card) 24', (goal) 68' (pen.); Paquetá (yellow card) 35'; Rebić (yellow card) 86'; Calabria (red card) 90+5' | Stadium: Stadio Marc'Antonio Bentegodi; Attendance: 24,363; Referee: Gianluca Manganiello |

| 21 September 2019 4 | Milan | 0–2 | Internazionale | Milan |
| 20:45 CEST (UTC+02:00) | Conti (yellow card) 48'; Rebić (yellow card) 88' | Report | Brozović 49'; Lukaku 78'; D'Ambrosio (yellow card) 82' | Stadium: San Siro; Attendance: 70,440; Referee: Daniele Doveri |

| 26 September 2019 5 | Torino | 2–1 | Milan | Turin |
| 21:00 CEST (UTC+02:00) | Lyanco (yellow card) 8'; Zaza (yellow card) 31'; Belotti (yellow card) 33', (goal) 72', 76'; Aina (yellow card) 81' | Report | Piątek 19' (pen.); Bennacer (yellow card) 21'; Hernandez (yellow card) 62'; Reina (red card) 73'; Romagnoli (yellow card) 73'; Donnarumma (yellow card) 77'; Musacchio (yellow card) 88' | Stadium: Stadio Olimpico Grande Torino; Attendance: 23,997; Referee: Marco Guida |

| 29 September 2019 6 | Milan | 1–3 | Fiorentina | Milan |
| 20:45 CEST (UTC+02:00) | Bennacer (yellow card) 13'; Musacchio (red card) 55'; Leão 80'; Calabria (yellow card) 86' | Report | Pulgar 14' (pen.); Milenković (yellow card) 35'; Pezzella (yellow card) 49'; Castrovilli 66'; Ribéry 78'; Lirola (yellow card) 86'; Benassi (yellow card) 87' | Stadium: San Siro; Attendance: 48,367; Referee: Piero Giacomelli |

| 5 October 2019 7 | Genoa | 1–2 | Milan | Genoa |
| 20:45 CEST (UTC+02:00) | Zapata (yellow card) 23'; Schöne 41', (yellow card) 67'; Saponara (red card) 45+2'; Biraschi (red card) 57'; Lerager (yellow card) 64'; Romero (yellow card) 88' | Report | Calabria (yellow card) 43' (yellow-red card) 79'; Hernandez 51'; Kessié 57' (pen.); Biglia (yellow card) 62'; Paquetá (yellow card) 84'; Castillejo (red card) 90+4' | Stadium: Stadio Luigi Ferraris; Attendance: 22,486; Referee: Maurizio Mariani |

| 20 October 2019 8 | Milan | 2–2 | Lecce | Milan |
| 20:45 CEST (UTC+02:00) | Çalhanoğlu 20'; Piątek 81'; Biglia (yellow card) 85' | Report | Majer (yellow card) 44'; Babacar 62'; Rossettini (yellow card) 76'; Calderoni 90+2' | Stadium: San Siro; Attendance: 48,703; Referee: Fabrizio Pasqua |

| 27 October 2019 9 | Roma | 2–1 | Milan | Rome |
| 18:00 CET (UTC+01:00) | Džeko 38'; Mancini (yellow card) 41'; Zaniolo 58'; Antonucci (yellow card) 78'; Çetin (yellow card) 83'; Kolarov (yellow card) 90+1' | Report | Musacchio (yellow card) 49'; Hernandez 55'; Biglia (yellow card) 64'; Çalhanoğlu (yellow card) 74'; Romagnoli (yellow card) 90+5'; A. Donnarumma (yellow card) 90+6' | Stadium: Stadio Olimpico; Attendance: 44,333; Referee: Daniele Orsato |
Note: Antonio Donnarumma was cautioned for dissent while a substitute.

| 31 October 2019 10 | Milan | 1–0 | SPAL | Milan |
| 21:00 CET (UTC+01:00) | Duarte (yellow card) 40'; G. Donnarumma (yellow card) 41'; Çalhanoğlu (yellow card) 57'; Suso 63'; Bennacer (yellow card) 69' | Report | Floccari (yellow card) 21'; Vicari (yellow card) 62'; Cionek (yellow card) 68'; Kurtić (yellow card) 73' | Stadium: San Siro; Attendance: 46,475; Referee: Marco Piccinini |

| 3 November 2019 11 | Milan | 1–2 | Lazio | Milan |
| 20:45 CET (UTC+01:00) | Bastos 28' (o.g.); Duarte (yellow card) 51'; Krunić (yellow card) 55'; Bennacer (yellow card) 87' | Report | Immobile 25'; Milinković-Savić (yellow card) 43'; Parolo (yellow card) 64'; Radu (yellow card) 64'; Lucas (yellow card) 70'; Correa 83'; Cataldi (yellow card) 88' | Stadium: San Siro; Attendance: 41,000; Referee: Gianpaolo Calvarese |

| 10 November 2019 12 | Juventus | 1–0 | Milan | Turin |
| 20:45 CET (UTC+01:00) | Cuadrado (yellow card) 57'; Dybala 77' | Report | Krunić (yellow card) 40'; Bennacer (yellow card) 45'; Hernandez (yellow card) 89'; Çalhanoğlu (yellow card) 90+1'; Suso (yellow card) 90+1' | Stadium: Juventus Stadium; Attendance: 40,478; Referee: Fabio Maresca |

| 23 November 2019 13 | Milan | 1–1 | Napoli | Milan |
| 18:00 CET (UTC+01:00) | Paquetá (yellow card) 26'; Bonaventura 29'; Hernandez (yellow card) 73'; Conti (yellow card) 90' | Report | Lozano 24'; Elmas (yellow card) 70'; Younes (yellow card) 78' | Stadium: San Siro; Attendance: 61,658; Referee: Daniele Orsato |

| 1 December 2019 14 | Parma | 0–1 | Milan | Parma |
| 15:00 CET (UTC+01:00) | Iacoponi (yellow card) 61' | Report | Bennacer (yellow card) 58'; Hernandez 88', (yellow card) 89'; G. Donnarumma (yellow card) 90' | Stadium: Stadio Ennio Tardini; Attendance: 18,431; Referee: Paolo Valeri |

| 8 December 2019 15 | Bologna | 2–3 | Milan | Bologna |
| 20:45 CET (UTC+01:00) | Bani (yellow card) 14'; Hernandez 40' (o.g.); Tomiyasu (yellow card) 74'; Palacio (yellow card) 77'; Santander (yellow card) 81'; Sansone 84' (pen.) | Report | Piątek 15' (pen.); Bennacer (yellow card) 21'; Hernandez 32'; Bonaventura 46'; Romagnoli (yellow card) 83' | Stadium: Stadio Renato Dall'Ara; Attendance: 23,707; Referee: Daniele Chiffi |

| 15 December 2019 16 | Milan | 0–0 | Sassuolo | Milan |
| 15:00 CET (UTC+01:00) | Hernandez (yellow card) 29'; Musacchio (yellow card) 40'; Kessié (yellow card) 43'; Bonaventura (yellow card) 72'; Paquetá (yellow card) 90+3' | Report | Toljan (yellow card) 10'; Caputo (yellow card) 39'; Locatelli (yellow card) 72'; Marlon (yellow card) 80' | Stadium: San Siro; Attendance: 58,005; Referee: Gianluca Manganiello |

| 22 December 2019 17 | Atalanta | 5–0 | Milan | Bergamo |
| 12:30 CET (UTC+01:00) | Gómez 10'; Castagne (yellow card) 47'; De Roon (yellow card) 56'; Pašalić 61'; Iličić 63', 72'; Muriel 84' | Report | Musacchio (yellow card) 37'; Suso (yellow card) 44'; Romagnoli (yellow card) 71'; Kessié (yellow card) 77' | Stadium: Stadio Atleti Azzurri d'Italia; Attendance: 20,940; Referee: Federico La Penna |

| 6 January 2020 18 | Milan | 0–0 | Sampdoria | Milan |
| 15:00 CET (UTC+01:00) | Krunić (yellow card) 13' | Report | Depaoli (yellow card) 40'; Thorsby (yellow card) 68'; Colley (yellow card) 71'; Bereszyński (yellow card) 78'; Linetty (yellow card) 90+1' | Stadium: San Siro; Attendance: 58,572; Referee: Davide Massa |

| 11 January 2020 19 | Cagliari | 0–2 | Milan | Cagliari |
| 15:00 CET (UTC+01:00) | Cigarini (yellow card) 26'; Nández (yellow card) 39'; Pellegrini (yellow card) 60' | Report | Leão 46'; Bennacer (yellow card) 61'; Ibrahimović 64' | Stadium: Stadio Sant'Elia; Attendance: 16,412; Referee: Rosario Abisso |

| 19 January 2020 20 | Milan | 3–2 | Udinese | Milan |
| 12:30 CET (UTC+01:00) | Bennacer (yellow card) 40'; Rebić 48', 90+3'; Conti (yellow card) 63'; Hernandez 71'; Ibrahimović (yellow card) 80'; Castillejo (yellow card) 90+4' | Report | Stryger Larsen 6'; Sema (yellow card) 27'; Lasagna 85' | Stadium: San Siro; Attendance: 56,107; Referee: Luca Pairetto |

| 24 January 2020 21 | Brescia | 0–1 | Milan | Brescia |
| 20:45 CET (UTC+01:00) | Sabelli (yellow card) 21'; Skrabb (yellow card) 89' | Report | Kjær (yellow card) 2'; Hernandez (yellow card) 36'; Conti (yellow card) 44'; Bennacer (yellow card) 62'; Rebić 71' | Stadium: Stadio Mario Rigamonti; Attendance: 19,451; Referee: Paolo Valeri |

| 2 February 2020 22 | Milan | 1–1 | Hellas Verona | Milan |
| 15:00 CET (UTC+01:00) | Çalhanoğlu 29'; Hernandez (yellow card) 45+1' | Report | Faraoni 13'; Rrahmani (yellow card) 24'; Amrabat (red card) 68'; Pessina (yellow card) 86'; Borini (yellow card) 90+3'; Silvestri (yellow card) 90+5' | Stadium: San Siro; Attendance: 55,355; Referee: Daniele Chiffi |

| 9 February 2020 23 | Internazionale | 4–2 | Milan | Milan |
| 20:45 CET (UTC+01:00) | Vecino (yellow card) 48', (goal) 54'; Brozović 51'; Škriniar (yellow card) 55'; Barella (yellow card) 55'; De Vrij 70'; Lukaku 90+3', (yellow card) 90+4' | Report | Rebić 40'; Ibrahimović 45+1'; Kessié (yellow card) 62'; Conti (yellow card) 79' | Stadium: San Siro; Attendance: 75,817; Referee: Fabio Maresca |

| 17 February 2020 24 | Milan | 1–0 | Torino | Milan |
| 20:45 CET (UTC+01:00) | Bennacer (yellow card) 22'; Rebić 25'; Castillejo (yellow card) 50'; Gabbia (yellow card) 85' | Report | Edera (yellow card) 34'; Rincón (yellow card) 60'; Ansaldi (yellow card) 73' | Stadium: San Siro; Attendance: 46,114; Referee: Michael Fabbri |

| 22 February 2020 25 | Fiorentina | 1–1 | Milan | Florence |
| 20:45 CET (UTC+01:00) | Dalbert (red card) 62'; Cáceres (yellow card) 76'; Pulgar 85' (pen.) | Report | Bennacer (yellow card) 12'; Çalhanoğlu (yellow card) 25'; Rebić 56'; Hernandez (yellow card) 85' | Stadium: Stadio Artemio Franchi; Attendance: 39,769; Referee: Gianpaolo Calvarese |

| 8 March 2020 26 | Milan | 1–2 | Genoa | Milan |
| 15:00 CET (UTC+01:00) | Ibrahimović 77' | Report | Pandev 7'; Cassata 41' | Stadium: San Siro; Attendance: 0 Referee: Daniele Doveri |
Note: Match was initially postponed to 13 May from its original date of 1 March due to concerns over the COVID-19 pandemic, but was later moved to 8 March to be played behind closed doors.

| 22 June 2020 27 | Lecce | 1–4 | Milan | Lecce |
| 19:30 CEST (UTC+02:00) | Lucioni (yellow card) 49'; Mancosu 54' (pen.) | Report | Castillejo 26'; Bonaventura 55'; Rebić 57'; Gabbia (yellow card) 64'; Leão 72' | Stadium: Stadio Via del Mare; Attendance: 0 Referee: Paolo Valeri |
Note: Match was postponed to 15 March, then to 22 June, from its original date of 9 March due to schedule shuffling to allow for Milan vs Genoa to be played following its previous postponement due to concerns over the COVID-19 pandemic. All subsequent matches were also shuffled to allow for this accommodation. On 9 March, all sports events in Italy were suspended until 3 April. This was the first match played since the COVID-19 pandemic lockdown in Italy.

| 28 June 2020 28 | Milan | 2–0 | Roma | Milan |
| 17:15 CEST (UTC+02:00) | Castillejo (yellow card) 41'; Rebić (yellow card) 62', (goal) 76'; Çalhanoğlu 89' (pen.) | Report | Pellegrini (yellow card) 23'; Veretout (yellow card) 90+1' | Stadium: San Siro; Attendance: 0 Referee: Piero Giacomelli |

| 1 July 2020 29 | SPAL | 2–2 | Milan | Ferrara |
| 21:45 CEST (UTC+02:00) | Valoti 13'; Floccari 30'; D'Alessandro (red card) 43'; Valdifiori (yellow card) 45'; Letica (yellow card) 58'; Dabo (yellow card) 83' | Report | Leão 79'; Vicari 90+3' (o.g.) | Stadium: Stadio Paolo Mazza; Attendance: 0 Referee: Maurizio Mariani |

| 4 July 2020 30 | Lazio | 0–3 | Milan | Rome |
| 21:45 CEST (UTC+02:00) | Lukaku (yellow card) 78' | Report | Çalhanoğlu 23'; Ibrahimović 34' (pen.); Rebić 59'; Paquetá (yellow card) 82' | Stadium: Stadio Olimpico; Attendance: 0 Referee: Gianpaolo Calvarese |

| 7 July 2020 31 | Milan | 4–2 | Juventus | Milan |
| 21:45 CEST (UTC+02:00) | Paquetá (yellow card) 31'; Bennacer (yellow card) 36'; Rebić (yellow card) 59', (goal) 80'; Ibrahimović 62' (pen.); Kessié 66'; Leão 67'; Conti (yellow card) 73' | Report | Rabiot 47'; Ronaldo 53'; Bonucci (yellow card) 62' | Stadium: San Siro; Attendance: 0 Referee: Marco Guida |

| 12 July 2020 32 | Napoli | 2–2 | Milan | Naples |
| 21:45 CEST (UTC+02:00) | Di Lorenzo (yellow card) 10', (goal) 34'; Mário Rui (yellow card) 30'; Mertens 60' | Report | Hernandez 20', (yellow card) 75'; Kessié 73' (pen.); Conti (yellow card) 77'; Saelemaekers (yellow card) 85' (yellow-red card) 88' | Stadium: Stadio San Paolo; Attendance: 0 Referee: Federico La Penna |

| 15 July 2020 33 | Milan | 3–1 | Parma | Milan |
| 19:30 CEST (UTC+02:00) | Conti (yellow card) 33'; Kessié 55'; Romagnoli 59'; Çalhanoğlu 77' | Report | Grassi (yellow card) 33'; Kurtić 44'; Darmian (yellow card) 65' | Stadium: San Siro; Attendance: 0 Referee: Massimiliano Irrati |

| 18 July 2020 34 | Milan | 5–1 | Bologna | Milan |
| 21:45 CEST (UTC+02:00) | Saelemaekers 10', (yellow card) 54'; Çalhanoğlu 24'; Bennacer 49'; Kjær (yellow card) 51'; Rebić 57'; Calabria 90+2' | Report | Sansone (yellow card) 35'; Tomiyasu 44' | Stadium: San Siro; Attendance: 0 Referee: Davide Massa |

| 21 July 2020 35 | Sassuolo | 1–2 | Milan | Reggio Emilia |
| 21:45 CEST (UTC+02:00) | Bourabia (yellow card) 22' (yellow-red card) 45+7'; Locatelli (yellow card) 34'; Caputo 42' (pen.) | Report | Ibrahimović 19', 45+2'; Hernandez (yellow card) 37'; Bennacer (yellow card) 61'; Laxalt (yellow card) 76'; Bonaventura (yellow card) 85' | Stadium: Mapei Stadium – Città del Tricolore; Attendance: 0 Referee: Luca Pairetto |

| 24 July 2020 36 | Milan | 1–1 | Atalanta | Milan |
| 21:45 CEST (UTC+02:00) | Çalhanoğlu 14'; Biglia (yellow card) 25' | Report | Zapata 34'; Toloi (yellow card) 38' | Stadium: San Siro; Attendance: 0 Referee: Daniele Doveri |

| 29 July 2020 37 | Sampdoria | 1–4 | Milan | Genoa |
| 19:30 CEST (UTC+02:00) | Bereszyński (yellow card) 36'; Askildsen 87' | Report | Ibrahimović 4', 58'; Rebić (yellow card) 45+6'; Çalhanoğlu 54'; Leão 90+2' | Stadium: Stadio Luigi Ferraris; Attendance: 0 Referee: Fabrizio Pasqua |

| 1 August 2020 38 | Milan | 3–0 | Cagliari | Milan |
| 20:45 CEST (UTC+02:00) | Klavan 11' (o.g.); Ibrahimović 55'; Castillejo 57'; Saelemaekers (yellow card) 67' | Report | Pereiro (yellow card) 13'; Faragò (yellow card) 45'; Cragno (yellow card) 58' | Stadium: San Siro; Attendance: 0 Referee: Marco Serra |

=== Coppa Italia ===
| 15 January 2020 Round of 16 | Milan | 3–0 | SPAL | Milan |
| 18:00 CET (UTC+01:00) | Piątek 20'; Conti (yellow card) 33'; Castillejo (yellow card) 41', (goal) 44'; Hernandez 66' | Report | Murgia (yellow card) 61'; Igor (yellow card) 72'; Salamon (yellow card) 84' | Stadium: San Siro; Attendance: 32,093; Referee: Davide Ghersini |

| 28 January 2020 Quarter-finals | Milan | 4–2 (a.e.t.) | Torino | Milan |
| 20:45 CET (UTC+01:00) | Bonaventura 12'; Hernandez (yellow card) 30'; Rebić (yellow card) 37'; Kjær (yellow card) 53'; Krunić (yellow card) 74'; Çalhanoğlu 90+1', 106'; Conti (yellow card) 93'; Ibrahimović 109', (yellow card) 111' | Report | Rincón (yellow card) 22'; Bremer 34', 71'; Izzo (yellow card) 37' | Stadium: San Siro; Attendance: 36,462; Referee: Fabrizio Pasqua |

| 13 February 2020 Semi-finals; First leg | Milan | 1–1 | Juventus | Milan |
| 20:45 CET (UTC+01:00) | Ibrahimović (yellow card) 30'; Hernandez (yellow card) 42' (yellow-red card) 71'; Kessié (yellow card) 58'; Rebić 61'; Castillejo (yellow card) 69'; Calabria (yellow card) 90' | Report | Ramsey (yellow card) 30'; Ronaldo 90+1' (pen.) | Stadium: San Siro; Attendance: 72,738; Referee: Paolo Valeri |

| 12 June 2020 Semi-finals; Second leg | Juventus | 0–0 (1–1 (a) agg.) | Milan | Turin |
| 21:00 CEST (UTC+02:00) | Pjanić (yellow card) 43'; Khedira (yellow card) 74' | Report | Conti (yellow card) 16'; Rebić (red card) 17' | Stadium: Allianz Stadium; Attendance: 0 Referee: Daniele Orsato |
Note: Match was postponed to 12 June from its original date of 4 March due to concerns over the coronavirus pandemic.

== Statistics ==
=== Appearances and goals ===
| No. | Pos | Nat | Player | Total | | Serie A | | Coppa Italia | |
| No. | Pos | Nat | Player | Apps | Goals | Apps | Goals | Apps | Goals |
Goalkeepers
| 1 | GK | (Bosnia and Herzegovina) BIH | Asmir Begović | 2 | 0 | 1+1 | 0 | 0 | 0 |
| 90 | GK | (Italy) ITA | Antonio Donnarumma | 1 | 0 | 0 | 0 | 1 | 0 |
| 99 | GK | (Italy) ITA | Gianluigi Donnarumma | 39 | 0 | 36 | 0 | 3 | 0 |
Defenders
| 2 | DF | (Italy) ITA | Davide Calabria | 27 | 1 | 16+9 | 1 | 2 | 0 |
| 12 | DF | (Italy) ITA | Andrea Conti | 26 | 0 | 21+2 | 0 | 3 | 0 |
| 13 | DF | (Italy) ITA | Alessio Romagnoli | 39 | 1 | 35 | 1 | 4 | 0 |
| 19 | DF | (France) FRA | Théo Hernandez | 36 | 7 | 32+1 | 6 | 3 | 1 |
| 22 | DF | (Argentina) ARG | Mateo Musacchio | 18 | 0 | 17+1 | 0 | 0 | 0 |
| 24 | DF | (Denmark) DEN | Simon Kjær | 19 | 0 | 15 | 0 | 4 | 0 |
| 43 | DF | (Brazil) BRA | Léo Duarte | 6 | 0 | 4+2 | 0 | 0 | 0 |
| 46 | DF | (Italy) ITA | Matteo Gabbia | 10 | 0 | 6+3 | 0 | 0+1 | 0 |
| 93 | DF | (Uruguay) URU | Diego Laxalt | 6 | 0 | 1+3 | 0 | 0+2 | 0 |
Midfielders
| 4 | MF | (Algeria) ALG | Ismaël Bennacer | 35 | 1 | 28+3 | 1 | 4 | 0 |
| 5 | MF | (Italy) ITA | Giacomo Bonaventura | 32 | 4 | 13+16 | 3 | 3 | 1 |
| 10 | MF | (Turkey) TUR | Hakan Çalhanoğlu | 38 | 11 | 34+1 | 9 | 2+1 | 2 |
| 20 | MF | (Argentina) ARG | Lucas Biglia | 14 | 0 | 8+6 | 0 | 0 | 0 |
| 33 | MF | (Bosnia and Herzegovina) BIH | Rade Krunić | 18 | 0 | 4+11 | 0 | 2+1 | 0 |
| 39 | MF | (Brazil) BRA | Lucas Paquetá | 27 | 0 | 12+12 | 0 | 1+2 | 0 |
| 56 | MF | (Belgium) BEL | Alexis Saelemaekers | 15 | 1 | 6+7 | 1 | 0+2 | 0 |
| 79 | MF | (Ivory Coast) CIV | Franck Kessié | 38 | 4 | 33+2 | 4 | 2+1 | 0 |
| 94 | MF | (Italy) ITA | Marco Brescianini | 1 | 0 | 0+1 | 0 | 0 | 0 |
Forwards
| 7 | FW | (Spain) ESP | Samu Castillejo | 25 | 3 | 16+6 | 2 | 3 | 1 |
| 17 | FW | (Portugal) POR | Rafael Leão | 33 | 6 | 12+19 | 6 | 0+2 | 0 |
| 18 | FW | (Croatia) CRO | Ante Rebić | 30 | 12 | 15+11 | 11 | 4 | 1 |
| 21 | FW | (Sweden) SWE | Zlatan Ibrahimović | 20 | 11 | 16+2 | 10 | 1+1 | 1 |
| 29 | FW | (Italy) ITA | Lorenzo Colombo | 2 | 0 | 0+1 | 0 | 0+1 | 0 |
| 98 | FW | (Italy) ITA | Daniel Maldini | 2 | 0 | 0+2 | 0 | 0 | 0 |
Players transferred out during the season
| 8 | MF | (Spain) ESP | Suso | 17 | 1 | 15+1 | 1 | 0+1 | 0 |
| 9 | FW | (Poland) POL | Krzysztof Piątek | 20 | 5 | 14+4 | 4 | 2 | 1 |
| 11 | FW | (Italy) ITA | Fabio Borini | 2 | 0 | 1+1 | 0 | 0 | 0 |
| 25 | GK | (Spain) ESP | Pepe Reina | 1 | 0 | 1 | 0 | 0 | 0 |
| 27 | FW | (Portugal) POR | André Silva | 1 | 0 | 1 | 0 | 0 | 0 |
| 31 | DF | (Italy) ITA | Mattia Caldara | 0 | 0 | 0 | 0 | 0 | 0 |
| 68 | DF | (Switzerland) SUI | Ricardo Rodríguez | 5 | 0 | 5 | 0 | 0 | 0 |

Source: Competitions

=== Goal scorers ===
| Rank | No. | Pos | Nat | Name | Serie A | Coppa Italia | Total |
|---|---|---|---|---|---|---|---|
| 1 | 18 | FW | (Croatia) | Ante Rebić | 11 | 1 | 12 |
| 2 | 10 | MF | (Turkey) | Hakan Çalhanoğlu | 9 | 2 | 11 |
| 2 | 21 | FW | (Sweden) | Zlatan Ibrahimović | 10 | 1 | 11 |
| 4 | 19 | DF | (France) | Théo Hernandez | 6 | 1 | 7 |
| 5 | 17 | FW | (Portugal) | Rafael Leão | 6 | 0 | 6 |
| 6 | 9 | FW | (Poland) | Krzysztof Piątek | 4 | 1 | 5 |
| 7 | 5 | MF | (Italy) | Giacomo Bonaventura | 3 | 1 | 4 |
| 7 | 79 | MF | (Ivory Coast) | Franck Kessié | 4 | 0 | 4 |
| 9 | 7 | MF | (Spain) | Samu Castillejo | 2 | 1 | 3 |
| 10 | 2 | DF | (Italy) | Davide Calabria | 1 | 0 | 1 |
| 10 | 4 | MF | (Algeria) | Ismael Bennacer | 1 | 0 | 1 |
| 10 | 8 | MF | (Spain) | Suso | 1 | 0 | 1 |
| 10 | 13 | DF | (Italy) | Alessio Romagnoli | 1 | 0 | 1 |
| 10 | 56 | MF | (Belgium) | Alexis Saelemaekers | 1 | 0 | 1 |
| Own goal | | | | | 3 | 0 | 3 |
| Totals | | | | | 63 | 8 | 71 |

In italics players that left the team during the season.

=== Assists ===
| Rank | No. | Pos | Nat | Name | Serie A | Coppa Italia | Total |
|---|---|---|---|---|---|---|---|
| 1 | 10 | FW | (Turkey) | Hakan Çalhanoğlu | 9 | 0 | 9 |
| 2 | 21 | FW | (Sweden) | Zlatan Ibrahimović | 5 | 0 | 5 |
| 2 | 7 | MF | (Spain) | Samu Castillejo | 3 | 2 | 5 |
| 2 | 5 | MF | (Italy) | Giacomo Bonaventura | 5 | 0 | 5 |
| 5 | 19 | DF | (France) | Théo Hernandez | 3 | 0 | 3 |
| 5 | 18 | FW | (Croatia) | Ante Rebić | 2 | 1 | 3 |
| 6 | 8 | FW | (Spain) | Suso | 2 | 0 | 2 |
| 6 | 79 | MF | (Ivory Coast) | Franck Kessié | 1 | 1 | 2 |
| 6 | 12 | DF | (Italy) | Andrea Conti | 2 | 0 | 2 |
| 6 | 17 | FW | (Portugal) | Rafael Leão | 1 | 1 | 2 |
| 10 | 33 | MF | (Bosnia and Herzegovina) | Rade Krunić | 1 | 0 | 1 |
| 10 | 39 | MF | (Brazil) | Lucas Paquetá | 1 | 0 | 1 |
| 10 | 2 | DF | (Italy) | Davide Calabria | 1 | 0 | 1 |
| 10 | 20 | MF | (Argentina) | Lucas Biglia | 1 | 0 | 1 |
| 10 | 9 | FW | (Poland) | Krzysztof Piątek | 0 | 1 | 1 |
| 10 | 4 | MF | (Algeria) | Ismaël Bennacer | 0 | 1 | 1 |
| 10 | Totals | | | | 37 | 7 | 44 |

In italics players that left the team during the season.

=== Clean sheets ===
| Rank | No. | Pos | Nat | Name | Serie A | Coppa Italia | Total |
|---|---|---|---|---|---|---|---|
| 1 | 99 | GK | (Italy) | Gianluigi Donnarumma | 13 | 1 | 14 |
| 2 | 90 | GK | (Italy) | Antonio Donnarumma | 0 | 1 | 1 |
| Totals | | | | | 11 | 2 | 13 |

=== Disciplinary record ===
| No. | Pos | Nat | Name | Serie A | | | Coppa Italia | | | Total | | |
| No. | Pos | Nat | Name | Booked | (yellow card) (yellow-red card) | Sent off (straight red) | Booked | (yellow card) (yellow-red card) | Sent off (straight red) | Booked | (yellow card) (yellow-red card) | Sent off (straight red) |
| 4 | MF | (Algeria) | Ismaël Bennacer | 14 | | | | | | 14 | | |
| 19 | DF | (France) | Théo Hernandez | 10 | | | 2 | 1 | | 12 | 1 | |
| 12 | DF | (Italy) | Andrea Conti | 8 | | | 3 | | | 11 | | |
| 39 | MF | (Brazil) | Lucas Paquetá | 7 | | | | | | 7 | | |
| 18 | FW | (Croatia) | Ante Rebić | 5 | | | 1 | | 1 | 6 | | 1 |
| 10 | FW | (Turkey) | Hakan Çalhanoğlu | 6 | | | | | | 6 | | |
| 7 | FW | (Spain) | Samu Castillejo | 3 | | 1 | 2 | | | 5 | | 1 |
| 2 | DF | (Italy) | Davide Calabria | 3 | 1 | 1 | 1 | | | 4 | 1 | 1 |
| 22 | DF | (Argentina) | Mateo Musacchio | 4 | | 1 | | | | 4 | | 1 |
| 13 | DF | (Italy) | Alessio Romagnoli | 4 | | | | | | 4 | | |
| 79 | MF | (Ivory Coast) | Franck Kessié | 3 | | | 1 | | | 4 | | |
| 33 | MF | (Bosnia and Herzegovina) | Rade Krunić | 3 | | | 1 | | | 4 | | |
| 20 | MF | (Argentina) | Lucas Biglia | 4 | | | | | | 4 | | |
| 56 | MF | (Belgium) | Alexis Saelemaekers | 3 | 1 | | | | | 3 | 1 | |
| 99 | GK | (Italy) | Gianluigi Donnarumma | 3 | | | | | | 3 | | |
| 24 | DF | (Denmark) | Simon Kjær | 2 | | | 1 | | | 3 | | |
| 21 | FW | (Sweden) | Zlatan Ibrahimović | 1 | | | 2 | | | 3 | | |
| 39 | DF | (Brazil) | Léo Duarte | 2 | | | | | | 2 | | |
| 8 | FW | (Spain) | Suso | 2 | | | | | | 2 | | |
| 5 | MF | (Italy) | Giacomo Bonaventura | 2 | | | | | | 2 | | |
| 9 | FW | (Portugal) | André Silva | 1 | | | | | | 1 | | |
| 11 | FW | (Italy) | Fabio Borini | 1 | | | | | | 1 | | |
| 9 | FW | (Poland) | Krzysztof Piątek | 1 | | | | | | 1 | | |
| 4 | DF | (Italy) | Matteo Gabbia | 1 | | | | | | 1 | | |
| 93 | DF | (Uruguay) | Diego Laxalt | 1 | | | | | | 1 | | |
| 25 | GK | (Spain) | Pepe Reina | | | 1 | | | | | | 1 |
| Totals | | | | 94 | 2 | 4 | 14 | 1 | 1 | 108 | 3 | 5 |

In italics players that left the team during the season.
