= Louise Essengue Parfait =

Cameroonian footballer

Essengue Parfait
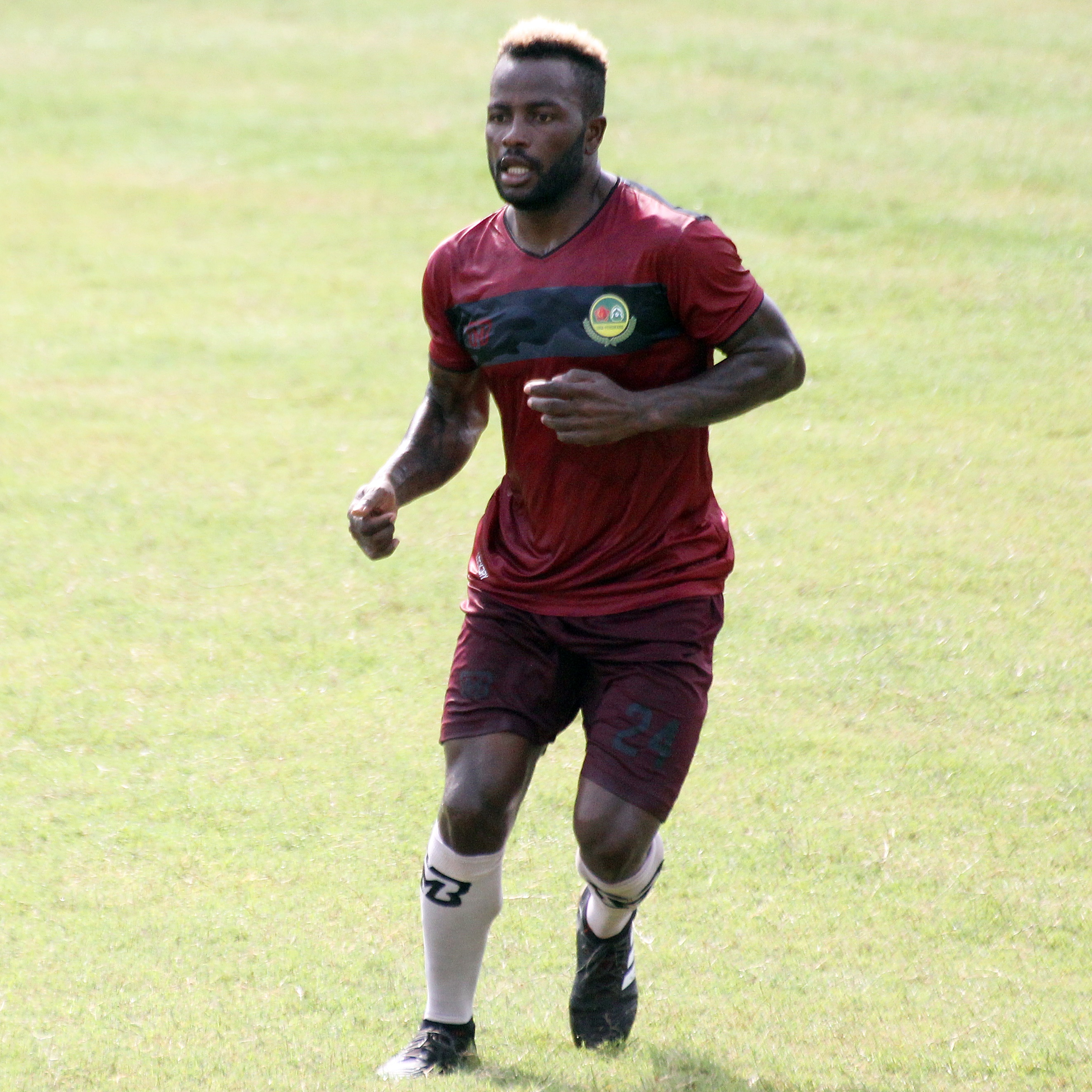
- Parfait with Persikabo 1973 in 2019

Personal information
- Full name: Louisse Essengue Eloumu Parfait
- Date of birth: 6 July 1990 (age 36)
- Place of birth: Yaoundé, Cameroon
- Height: 1.76 m (5 ft 9 1/2 in)
- Position: Central midfielder

Team information
- Current team: Colleferro
- Number: 13

Youth career
- –2009: Genoa

Senior career*
| Years | Team | Apps | (Gls) |
| 2008–2012 | Genoa | 0 | (0) |
| 2009–2010 | → Piacenza (loan) | 20 | (0) |
| 2010–2011 | → Crotone (loan) | 14 | (0) |
| 2011–2012 | → Ascoli (loan) | 31 | (1) |
| 2012–2014 | Cesena | 20 | (0) |
| 2013 | → Lecce (loan) | 7 | (0) |
| 2014 | → Pisa (loan) | 13 | (0) |
| 2014–2015 | Chiasso | 25 | (2) |
| 2017 | Club Africain | | |
| 2017 | → Olympique Béja (loan) | | |
| 2018 | Sileks | 16 | (3) |
| 2019 | TIRA-Persikabo | 31 | (3) |
| 2022– | Colleferro | 0 | (0) |

International career
| 2009 | Cameroon U20 | 3 | (0) |
- * Club domestic league appearances and goals as of 27 June 2022

Louise Essengue Eloumu Parfait (born 6 July 1990) is a Cameroonian footballer who plays for Italian club Colleferro. He was known as Essengue or P.Essengue on his shirt but commonly refer as Louise Parfait in Italian media.

== Career ==
=== Club career ===
Essengue began his career in Italy with Genoa. With the youth team he won the Coppa Italia Primavera 2008/09.

He was sent on loan to Serie B club Piacenza for the 2009–10 season. He made his debut for Piacenza on October 24, 2009 as starter in a 2–3 home defeat against Modena.

On 21 July 2011 he was signed by Ascoli.

On 21 June 2012 he was transferred to A.C. Cesena for €150,000 in 4-year contract.

On 2 September 2013 Essengue joined Italian third division club Lecce. On 14 January 2014 he was signed by Pisa.

On 8 August 2014 Essengue was sold to Chiasso.

=== International career ===
Parfait has played for Cameroon at Under-20 level. In 2009, he played in the African Youth Championship which was held in Rwanda.

He also represented Cameroon team in the 2009 FIFA U-20 World Cup, where he played three games.
