= Antonio Donnarumma =

Italian footballer (born 1990)

Personal information
- Date of birth: 7 July 1990 (age 36)
- Place of birth: Castellammare di Stabia, Italy
- Height: 1.92 m (6 ft 3 1/2 in)
- Position: Goalkeeper

Youth career
- 1999–2005: Juve Stabia
- 2005–2010: AC Milan

Senior career*
Years	Team	Apps	(Gls)
2008–2012	AC Milan	0	(0)
2010–2011	→ Piacenza (loan)	2	(0)
2011–2012	→ Gubbio (loan)	37	(0)
2012–2016	Genoa	1	(0)
2014–2015	→ Bari (loan)	25	(0)
2016–2017	Asteras Tripolis	21	(0)
2017–2021	AC Milan	0	(0)
2021–2024	Padova	106	(0)
2024–2025	Torino	0	(0)
2025–2026	Salernitana	38	(0)
- * Club domestic league appearances and goals as of 1 May 2026

Antonio Donnarumma (Italian pronunciation: [anˈtɔːnjo ˌdɔnnaˈrumma]; born 7 July 1990) is an Italian professional footballer who plays as a goalkeeper.

== Club career ==
=== Early career ===
A native of Castellammare di Stabia, Donnarumma started his football career with local team Juve Stabia, before joining AC Milan at the age of 15. He spent five seasons in the club's youth system and he was a member of the under-17 squad who won the Campionato Nazionale Allievi in 2007, as well as a member of the under-20 side who claimed the Coppa Italia Primavera in 2010, 25 years after the team's last success in the competition – though he missed the second leg of the final through suspension.

Donnarumma was also selected five times for first-team games since 2008, but eventually he was never fielded nor named on the bench. In spite of that, Milan Youth Department Manager Filippo Galli hinted that the young goalkeeper might have been ready to join the first team permanently.

=== Piacenza ===
In the end, however, Donnarumma was loaned out to Serie B club Piacenza for the 2010–11 season, in order to gain some first team experience. He made his official debut for the club on 14 August 2010, in the second preliminary round of the Coppa Italia against Virtus Lanciano; he played the whole 120 minutes, as Piacenza won 5–3 after extra time. However, the next week he was dropped in favour of Mario Cassano for the first league game of the season. His second appearance came on 27 October, in the third preliminary round of the Coppa Italia against Serie A club Cagliari; despite his team suffering a 3–0 defeat, Donnarumma's performance was considered good.

Donnarumma continued to serve as Cassano's understudy throughout the season, but with two games remaining Cassano was given a three-game ban for insulting a referee. This allowed Donnarumma to make his Serie B debut on 21 May 2011, in a home game against Albinoleffe; although he pulled off some good saves in the first half, Piacenza lost the game 3–1. The following week, he was still in the starting line up, as his team suffered a 1–0 loss to Varese. Piacenza finished the season in 19th place and were set to play a relegation play–off against Albinoleffe. Donnarumma played in the first leg, keeping a clean sheet in a 0–0 draw, but he was benched in favour of the returning Cassano for the second leg, a 2–2 away draw, which meant Piacenza were relegated to Prima Divisione.

=== Gubbio ===
For the 2011–12 season, AC Milan sent Donnarumma to newly promoted Serie B club Gubbio on another loan spell, with an option to sign the player on a permanent basis the following season. Donnarumma made his official debut for the club on 15 August 2011, in the second preliminary round of the Coppa Italia against Benevento; he played the whole 120 minutes of a 2–2 extra time draw and then pulled off two saves in the penalty shoot-out, helping his team to win 3–2. The following week, he made a couple of crucial saves in a 4–3 win over Atalanta in the third preliminary round. Donnarumma retained his place in the starting line up also for the first league game of the season, a 2–0 away loss to Grosseto, on 27 August. He went on to make 37 league appearances throughout the 42-game season, as Gubbio finished second-to-last in the table and were relegated to Prima Divisione.

While answering questions from fans during a live chat session on 30 May 2012, Donnarumma stated that he was "99.9% sure" he would sign an extension to his contract with Milan, which was due to expire the following year. However, he also pointed out that he was "not going to stay at Milan to be the third-choice goalkeeper" and instead he would prefer to spend another season on loan in order to play regularly, hopefully with "a Serie B team that fights for promotion".

=== Genoa ===
Despite his earlier statements, on 31 August 2012 – transfer deadline day – Donnarumma was transferred to Serie A club Genoa for a €1.8 million transfer fee on a 3-year contract, as a part of a deal which saw youth prospect Johad Ferretti join Milan, also for a €1.8 million transfer fee. Donnarumma spent the season as the third-choice goalkeeper behind Sébastien Frey and Alexandros Tzorvas, making his only one appearance and Serie A debut in a 0–0 draw at Bologna on the last day. He kept the same role in the following season, backing up his new teammates Mattia Perin and Albano Bizzarri. Despite not making a single appearance throughout the season, in February he signed an extension to his contract with Genoa until 2018.

=== Bari ===
For the 2014–15 season, Donnarumma joined Serie B club Bari on loan. He started the season as the regular goalkeeper for the side, before losing out his place in the line-up to Enrico Guarna in mid-February.

=== Asteras Tripolis ===
On 27 July 2016, Donnarumma joined Super League Greece club Asteras Tripolis on a three-year contract for an undisclosed fee. On 30 October 2016, he made his debut with the club in a home cup game against Veria.

=== Return to AC Milan ===
On 12 July 2017, Donnarumma re-joined his brother Gianluigi at Milan, signing a four-year deal. Due to injuries to both Milan's first choice keeper and Donnarumma's brother, Gianluigi, as well as the club's second goalkeeper, Marco Storari, Antonio made his Milan debut on 27 December 2017 against Inter Milan in a Derby della Madonnina match in the Coppa Italia, keeping a clean sheet over 120 minutes in a 1–0 victory after extra time. He made his European debut on 22 February 2018, in the second leg of a 1–0 home victory over Ludogorets in the round of 32 of the Europa League. After a season without appearances, Donnarumma was rumored to have been placed on the transfer market, primarily due to his unusually high yearly salary of €1 million for a third-choice goalkeeper. However, as no transfer move happened during the summer of 2019, he remained in the squad. On 15 January 2020, Donnarumma made his third appearance for the club in a 3–0 home win against S.P.A.L. in the round of 16 of Coppa Italia, once again keeping a clean sheet. As a result, he became the first goalkeeper in Milan's history not to concede goals within 300 minutes of play since the debut appearance.

=== Padova ===
On 20 August 2021, Donnarumma joined Serie C club Padova.

=== Torino ===
On 14 August 2024, Donnarumma signed a two-season contract with Torino, returning to Serie A.

=== Salernitana ===
On 8 August 2025, Donnaruma joined Salernitana in Serie C on a one-season contract, with an automatic renewal option if certain performance conditions are met.

== Personal life ==
Donnarumma's younger brother, Gianluigi, currently plays for Manchester City. The pair played together for Milan from 2017 to 2021.

== Career statistics ==
As of 2 May 2024

Appearances and goals by club, season and competition
Club	Season	League			National Cup		Europe		Other		Total	
Club	Season	Division	Apps	Goals	Apps	Goals	Apps	Goals	Apps	Goals	Apps	Goals
Milan	2009–10	Serie A	0	0	0	0	0	0	—		0	0
Piacenza	2010–11	Serie B	2	0	2	0	—		1 (Note: Appearance in Serie B relegation play–offs)	0	5	0
Gubbio	2011–12	Serie B	37	0	2	0	—		—		39	0
Genoa	2012–13	Serie A	1	0	0	0	—		—		1	0
Genoa	2013–14	Serie A	0	0	0	0	—		—		0	0
Genoa	Total		1	0	0	0	0	0	0	0	1	0
Bari	2014–15	Serie B	25	0	2	0	—		—		27	0
Genoa	2015–16	Serie A	0	0	0	0	—		—		0	0
Asteras Tripolis	2016–17	Super League Greece	21	0	2	0	—		—		23	0
Milan	2017–18	Serie A	0	0	1	0	1 (Note: Appearance in UEFA Europa League)	0	—		2	0
Milan	2018–19	Serie A	0	0	0	0	0	0	0	0	0	0
Milan	2019–20	Serie A	0	0	1	0	—		—		1	0
Milan	2020–21	Serie A	0	0	0	0	0	0	—		0	0
Milan	Total		0	0	2	0	1	0	0	0	3	0
Padova	2021–22	Serie C	41	0	0	0	—		—		41	0
Padova	2022–23	Serie C	39	0	1	0	—		—		40	0
Padova	2023–24	Serie C	34	0	0	0	—		—		34	0
Padova	Total		114	0	1	0	0	0	0	0	115	0
Career total			200	0	11	0	1	0	1	0	213	0

== Honours ==
AC Milan Primavera

- Coppa Italia Primavera: 2009–10

Padova

- Coppa Italia Serie C: 2021–22
