= Masahudu Alhassan =

Ghanaian international footballer

Personal information
- Date of birth: 1 December 1992 (age 33)
- Place of birth: Tarkwa, Ghana
- Height: 1.76 m (5 ft 9 in)
- Position: Left-back

Team information
- Current team: Anzio (player-head coach)
- Number: 18

Youth career
- Prampram Mighty Royals
- 2008–2010: Rimini
- 2010–2011: Genoa

Senior career*
Years	Team	Apps	(Gls)
2011–2013	Genoa	4	(0)
2012–2013	→ Novara (loan)	18	(1)
2013–2015	Udinese	0	(0)
2013–2014	→ Latina (loan)	42	(1)
2015	→ Latina (loan)	16	(1)
2015–2016	→ Perugia (loan)	11	(0)
2016–2017	Perugia	3	(0)
2018	Teuta Durrës	13	(1)
2018–2019	Al-Ain		
2020	TPS	17	(1)
2021–2022	ENPPI	0	(0)
2023	Jazz	12	(0)
2024–2025	Ravshan Kulob		
2026–	Anzio	0	(0)

International career
2011	Ghana U20	3	(0)
2011–2012	Ghana	8	(0)

Managerial career
- 2026–: Anzio
- * Club domestic league appearances and goals as of 16:45, 21 February 2026 (UTC)

Masahudu Alhassan (born 1 December 1992) is a Ghanaian professional footballer who plays as a left-back for Anzio, where he is also head coach.

== Club career ==
Alhassan spent his early career with the youth team of Ghanaian club Prampram Mighty Royals, before joining the youth team of Italian club Rimini, before later signing for Genoa, where he made his professional debut.

In January 2013, it was announced that Serie A club Udinese had signed Alhassan on a co-ownership deal, for €1.5 million, as part of Antonio Floro Flores's deal. Udinese also signed Alexander Merkel in the same deal. In June 2013 Udinese signed Alhassan outright for another €620,000.

On 4 August 2013, he joined Latina on a loan deal. In January 2015 he returned to Latina. He moved to Albanian club Teuta Durrës in January 2018.

On 6 September 2018, Al-Ain has signed Alhassan for one seasons from Teuta Durrës. On 26 February 2020, Alhassan joined Finnish club Turun Palloseura for one year. In May 2023, Alhassan was signed by FC Jazz.

On 28 February 2024, Alhassan signed a one-year contract with Tajikistan Higher League club Ravshan Kulob.

In January 2026 he became player-head coach of Italian Serie D club Anzio.

== International career ==
Alhassan was part of the Ghana national under-20 football team at the 2011 African Youth Championship.

On 7 November 2011, Alhassan was called up to the Ghana senior squad to face Sierra Leone and Gabon.

In December 2011, Alhassan was named to Ghana's provisional 25-man squad for the 2012 Africa Cup of Nations, and in January 2012 he was selected for the tournament's 23-man squad.

== Career statistics ==
=== Club ===
As of 17 May 2025

Appearances and goals by club, season and competition
Club	Season	Division	League		National cup (Note: Includes Coppa Italia, Albanian Cup and Suomen Cup)		Other		Total	
Club	Season	Division	Apps	Goals	Apps	Goals	Apps	Goals	Apps	Goals
Genoa	2011–12	Serie A	4	0	0	0	–		4	0
Novara (loan)	2012–13	Serie B	18	1	2	0	–		20	1
Udinese	2013–14	Serie A	0	0	0	0	–		0	0
Latina (loan)	2013–14	Serie B	38	1	1	0	4	0	43	1
Latina (loan)	2014–15	Serie B	16	1	–		–		16	1
Latina (loan)	Total		54	2	1	0	4	0	59	2
Perugia (loan)	2015–16	Serie B	11	0	2	0	–		13	0
Perugia	2016–17	Serie B	3	0	2	0	0	0	5	0
Perugia	2017–18	Serie B	0	0	1	0	–		1	0
Perugia	Total		3	0	3	0	0	0	6	0
Teuta	2017–18	Kategoria Superiore	13	1	2	0	–		15	1
Al-Ain	2018–19	Saudi First Division					–			
TPS	2020	Veikkausliiga	17	1	2	0	2	0	21	1
ENPPI	2021–22	Egyptian Premier League	0	0	0	0	–		0	0
Jazz	2023	Kakkonen	12	0	1	0	–		13	0
Ravshan Kulob	2024	Tajikistan Higher League					–			
Career total			132	5	13	0	6	0	151	5

=== International ===
As of 29 February 2012

Appearances and goals by national team and year
National team	Year	Apps	Goals
Ghana	2011	2	0
Ghana	2012	6	0
Total		8	0
