= Alessio Benedetti (footballer, born 1997) =

Italian professional footballer

Personal information
- Date of birth: 7 April 1997 (age 29)
- Place of birth: Motta di Livenza, Italy
- Height: 1.85 m (6 ft 1 in)
- Position: Centre-back

Team information
- Current team: ASD Liventina

Youth career
- –2015: Vicenza
- 2013–2014: → Genoa (loan)
- 2014–2015: → Genoa (loan)
- 2015–2016: Torino

Senior career*
Years	Team	Apps	(Gls)
2016–2018	Torino	0	(0)
2017	→ Taranto (loan)	2	(0)
2017–2018	→ Carrarese (loan)	11	(0)
2018–2019	Pontedera	29	(1)
2019–2021	Pro Vercelli	4	(0)
2021–	ASD Liventina		
- * Club domestic league appearances and goals as of 3 November 2019

Alessio Benedetti (born 7 April 1997) is an Italian professional footballer who plays as a centre-back for ASD Liventina.

== Club career ==
=== Vicenza ===
Born in Motta di Livenza, in the Veneto region, Benedetti started his career at the Veneto club Vicenza Calcio. In May 2013, he received a call-up from the Italian Football Federation (FIGC) for a youth tournament composed of Italian under-16 players. He was assigned to Team C along with fellow Vicenza defender Simone Romio and future Vicenza teammate Luigi Rizzo (who was signed in January 2015). The tournament also served as the kickoff event for the Italy national under-17 football team for the 2013–14 season. However, Benedetti earned a transfer to a higher division after the tournament, but failed to earn any national team call-ups.

In summer 2013, Benedetti was signed by the youth team of Serie A club Genoa in a temporary deal with an option to purchase. At the same time, Vicenza signed Alberto Marchiori from Genoa also in a temporary deal, with an option to purchase. The loan was renewed on 30 July 2014. Benedetti was the member of Genoa's under-17 youth team in the first season and the under-19 reserves in the second season.

=== Torino ===
In the summer of 2015, shortly after he returned from Genoa, Benedetti was signed by another Serie A club, Torino, in a definitive deal for a €30,000 transfer fee on a 3-year contract. Benedetti spent 1 1/2 seasons with Torino's reserves, with the last 6 months as an overage player. He also participated in the 2015–16 UEFA Youth League for the Turin-based club.

Benedetti left for Lega Pro club Taranto on 1 February 2017. Benedetti made his professional debut against Melfi on 23 April, as one of the starting defenders.

On 4 August 2017 Benedetti joined Carrarese.

=== Pro Vercelli ===
On 2 September 2019, he joined Pro Vercelli.

=== Liventina ===
On 30 July 2021, he joined Eccellenza club ASD Liventina.
