= Aleksandr Merkel =

Kazakh footballer

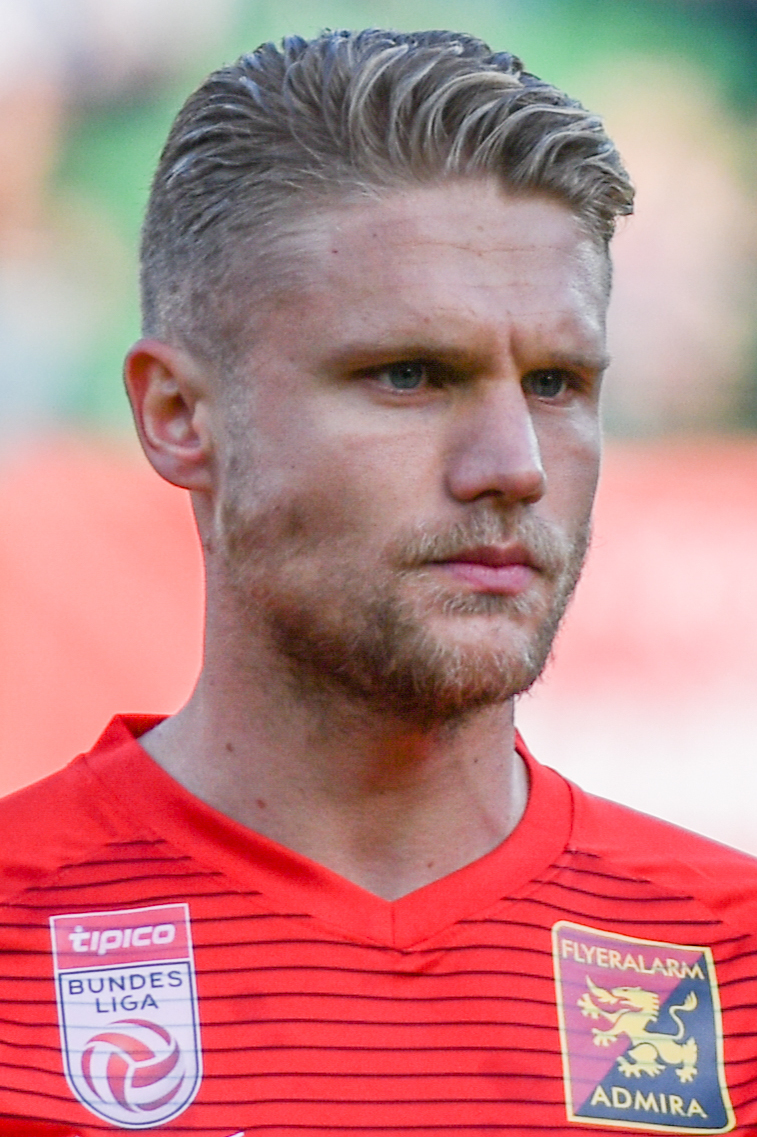
- Merkel with Admira Wacker in 2018

Personal information
- Full name: Aleksandr Vasilyevich Merkel
- Date of birth: 22 February 1992 (age 34)
- Place of birth: Almaty, Kazakhstan
- Height: 1.77 m (5 ft 10 in)
- Position: Midfielder

Team information
- Current team: Astana
- Number: 21

Youth career
- 1999: Okzhetpes
- 1999–2003: JSG Westerwald
- 2003–2008: VfB Stuttgart
- 2008–2010: AC Milan

Senior career*
| Years | Team | Apps | (Gls) |
| 2010–2011 | AC Milan | 6 | (0) |
| 2011–2013 | Genoa | 19 | (1) |
| 2012 | → AC Milan (loan) | 1 | (0) |
| 2013–2016 | Udinese | 6 | (0) |
| 2014 | → Watford (loan) | 11 | (1) |
| 2014–2015 | → Grasshopper Club Zurich (loan) | 6 | (0) |
| 2016 | Pisa | 0 | (0) |
| 2016–2018 | VfL Bochum | 13 | (0) |
| 2018 | Admira Wacker | 15 | (1) |
| 2018–2020 | Heracles Almelo | 59 | (2) |
| 2020–2021 | Al-Faisaly | 27 | (1) |
| 2021–2023 | Gaziantep | 38 | (3) |
| 2023–2024 | Hatta | 10 | (2) |
| 2024–2025 | Nassaji Mazandaran | 18 | (1) |
| 2025–2026 | Legentus | 0 | (0) |
| 2026 | Zhenis | 11 | (0) |
| 2026– | Astana | 12 | (0) |

International career^{‡}
| 2007 | Germany U15 | 2 | (0) |
| 2007–2008 | Germany U16 | 15 | (1) |
| 2008 | Germany U17 | 3 | (0) |
| 2009 | Germany U18 | 2 | (0) |
| 2010–2011 | Germany U19 | 2 | (1) |
| 2011 | Germany U20 | 1 | (0) |
| 2015–2019 | Kazakhstan | 3 | (0) |
Medal record
Milan
| Winner | Serie A | 2010–11 |
- * Club domestic league appearances and goals as of 1 November 2026 ‡ National team caps and goals as of 21 March 2019

Aleksandr Vasilyevich Merkel (Russian: Александр Васильевич Меркель; born 22 February 1992) is a Kazakhstani professional footballer who plays as a midfielder for Astana.

Born in Kazakhstan to parents of German descent, Merkel initially represented Germany internationally at youth level. He switched allegiance to Kazakhstan in 2015, making his debut in a UEFA Euro 2016 qualifying game.

== Club career ==
=== Early career ===
Born in Kazakhstan to parents of German ancestry, Merkel moved to Germany in 1998, aged 6. There he started playing football with amateur team JSG Westerwald, before joining VfB Stuttgart at the age of 11.

=== AC Milan ===
In 2008, at age 16, Merkel transferred to Italian side AC Milan. During his time in the club's youth system, he was a member of the under-20 side who won the Coppa Italia Primavera in 2010, 25 years after the team's last success in the competition.

Merkel received his first call-ups for the senior team during the 2009–10 campaign, but he was never fielded nor named on the bench. At the beginning of the following season, he took part in some pre-season games, putting up good performances. Merkel eventually made his first-team official debut on 8 December 2010, coming off the bench in a UEFA Champions League group stage game against Ajax. He also came off the bench against Tottenham on the 75th minute for Kevin-Prince Boateng on 6 January 2011. He also made his league debut, figuring in the starting line-up for a match against Cagliari. Merkel went on to score his first professional goal on 20 January, as Milan pulled off a 3–0 win over Bari in the Coppa Italia round of 16. In total, he made ten appearances, six of which were in the league, throughout the season.

=== Genoa ===
At the beginning of the 2011–12 season, Merkel joined Genoa in co-ownership with Milan, for €5 million, which, in turn, signed Stephan El Shaarawy in a same type of deal, for €10 million. Merkel made his official debut for the club in 4–3 win over Nocerina in third preliminary round of the Coppa Italia, on 20 August 2011. Merkel made his first assist of the season with a left-footed cross to Marco Rossi a 2–2 draw against Juventus. On 17 January 2012, he returned to AC Milan on loan from Genoa. He made his official re-debut wearing Milan's red-black shirt on 18 January, winning 2–1 over Novara in the 16th round of the 2011–12 Coppa Italia. Genoa bought the remaining 50% of his rights for another €5 million on 23 May 2012 making him a full Genoa player, as well as El Shaarawy moved to Milan for another €10 million.

=== Udinese ===
On 3 January 2013, 50% registration rights of Merkel (€4 million) and Masahudu Alhassan (€1.5 million) were sold to Udinese Calcio for a total of €5.5 million, as part of Antonio Floro Flores's deal. In June 2013 Udinese acquired them outright for another €1.78 million (€1.16 million and €620,000).

==== Watford (loan) ====
On 3 January 2014, Merkel joined Watford on loan from Udinese until the end of the season.

Merkel made his debut from the start in a 1–0 defeat to Reading on 11 January 2014, but he was sent off in second half stoppage time after a lunge on Nick Blackman. Merkel scored his first goal for Watford in a 3–0 home win against Barnsley on 15 March 2014.

==== Grasshopper Club Zurich (loan) ====
On 14 July 2014, Merkel signed for Grasshopper Club Zurich on a season long loan deal from parent club Udinese.

=== Pisa ===
On 21 July 2016, Merkel joined his former Milan teammate Gennaro Gattuso, who served as manager at Pisa. However, after Gattuso suddenly left the club on 31 July 2016, Merkel was released by the club on 14 August 2016.

=== VfL Bochum ===
On 15 August 2016, Merkel signed with VfL Bochum.

=== Admira Wacker ===
On 5 February 2018, Merkel signed with Austrian club Admira Wacker. He signed his first goal in the match against Wolfsberger AC.

=== Heracles Almelo ===
On 29 July 2018, Merkel signed with Eredivisie side Heracles Almelo.

=== Al-Faisaly ===
On 14 September 2020, Merkel signed with Saudi Professional League club Al-Faisaly.

=== Gaziantep ===
On 19 August 2021, Turkish club Gaziantep F.K. announced the signing of Merkel.

=== Hatta ===
On 5 July 2023, Merkel signed with UAE Pro League club Hatta.

== International career ==
Merkel made his international debut for Germany U-15 in a 4–1 win against Switzerland and has since represented Germany at all levels of youth international football up to under-19. In a December 2010 interview, he stated that he "dreams" of going on to play for the senior team one day.

In another December 2010 interview he said that he is interested in representing Russia. Russian Football Union president Sergey Fursenko and Russia's coach Dick Advocaat both commented saying that he can't be called up as he does not actually possess Russian citizenship. Merkel noted that naturalization should not be a problem, considering that an American-born Jon Robert Holden played for the Russia national basketball team.

In February 2011, Merkel's adviser Arthur Beck, father of German international Andreas Beck, confirmed the player's renewed wishes to be capped for Germany.

In March 2015, Merkel decided to play for the Kazakhstan national team. He made his debut against Iceland in a qualifying match for Euro 2016.

== Career statistics ==
=== Club ===
As of match played 27 May 2018

Appearances and goals by club, season and competition
| Club | Season | League | | | Cup | | Continental | | Total | |
| Club | Season | Division | Apps | Goals | Apps | Goals | Apps | Goals | Apps | Goals |
|---|---|---|---|---|---|---|---|---|---|---|
| AC Milan | 2010–11 | Serie A | 6 | 0 | 2 | 1 | 2 (Note: Appearances in UEFA Champions League) | 0 | 10 | 1 |
| Genoa | 2011–12 | Serie A | 13 | 0 | 1 | 0 | — | | 14 | 0 |
| Genoa | 2012–13 | Serie A | 6 | 1 | 1 | 0 | — | | 7 | 1 |
| Genoa | Total | | 19 | 1 | 2 | 0 | 0 | 0 | 21 | 1 |
| AC Milan (loan) | 2011–12 | Serie A | 1 | 0 | 2 | 0 | 0 | 0 | 3 | 0 |
| Udinese | 2012–13 | Serie A | 5 | 0 | 0 | 0 | — | | 5 | 0 |
| Udinese | 2013–14 | Serie A | 0 | 0 | 0 | 0 | — | | 0 | 0 |
| Udinese | Total | | 5 | 0 | 0 | 0 | 0 | 0 | 5 | 0 |
| Watford | 2013–14 | Championship | 11 | 1 | 0 | 0 | — | | 11 | 1 |
| Grasshopper Club Zurich | 2014–15 | Swiss Super League | 6 | 0 | 2 | 0 | 3 (Note: One appearance in UEFA Champions League, two appearances in UEFA Europa League) | 0 | 11 | 0 |
| Udinese | 2015–16 | Serie A | 1 | 0 | 0 | 0 | — | | 1 | 0 |
| Pisa | 2016–17 | Serie B | 0 | 0 | 0 | 0 | — | | 0 | 0 |
| VfL Bochum | 2016–17 | 2. Bundesliga | 11 | 0 | 0 | 0 | — | | 11 | 0 |
| VfL Bochum | 2017–18 | 2. Bundesliga | 2 | 0 | 1 | 0 | — | | 3 | 0 |
| VfL Bochum | Total | | 13 | 0 | 1 | 0 | 0 | 0 | 14 | 2 |
| Admira Wacker | 2017–18 | Austrian Bundesliga | 15 | 1 | 0 | 0 | — | | 15 | 1 |
| Career total | | | 77 | 3 | 9 | 1 | 5 | 0 | 91 | 4 |

=== International ===
As of match played 24 March 2019

Appearances and goals by national team and year
| National team | Year | Apps | Goals |
|---|---|---|---|
| Kazakhstan | 2015 | 1 | 0 |
| Kazakhstan | 2019 | 2 | 0 |
| Total | | 3 | 0 |

== Honours ==
Milan

- Serie A: 2010–11

Al-Faisaly

- King Cup: 2020–21
