= Egidio Guarnacci =

Italian footballer (born 1934)

Personal information
- Date of birth: 3 February 1934 (age 92)
- Place of birth: Rome, Kingdom of Italy
- Height: 1.79 m (5 ft 10 1/2 in)
- Position: Midfielder

Senior career*
Years	Team	Apps	(Gls)
1953–1963	Roma	122	(4)
1955–1956	→ Colleferro (loan)	33	(1)
1963–1966	Fiorentina	61	(0)

International career
1959–1960	Italy	3	(0)
- * Club domestic league appearances and goals

Egidio Guarnacci (Italian pronunciation: [eˈdʒiːdjo ɡwarˈnattʃi]; born 3 February 1934) is a retired Italian professional footballer who played as a midfielder.

He played for 11 seasons (183 games, 4 goals) in the Serie A for A.S. Roma and ACF Fiorentina.

After retirement he opened a pharmacy.

== Honours ==
=== Roma ===
- Inter-Cities Fairs Cup winner: 1960–61.

=== Fiorentina ===
- Coppa Italia winner: 1965–66.
- Mitropa Cup winner: 1965–66.
