= Enis Nadarević =

Bosnian-Herzegovinian football winger (born 1987)

Personal information
- Full name: Enis Nadarević
- Date of birth: 19 July 1987 (age 39)
- Place of birth: Tržac, SR Bosnia and Herzegovina, Yugoslavia
- Height: 1.84 m (6 ft 0 in)
- Position: Winger

Team information
- Current team: Città di Fasano

Youth career
- Krajina Cazin

Senior career*
Years	Team	Apps	(Gls)
2006	Kufstein		
2006–2010	Sanvitese	67	(33)
2010–2013	Varese	77	(3)
2013–2015	Genoa	3	(0)
2013–2014	→ Cesena (loan)	8	(0)
2014	→ Bari (loan)	10	(1)
2014–2015	→ Trapani (loan)	34	(4)
2015–2016	Trapani	11	(1)
2016	→ Novara (loan)	9	(1)
2016–2017	Monopoli	8	(1)
2017–2018	Fidelis Andria	19	(0)
2018	Città di Fasano	14	(5)
2018–2019	Cerignola	9	(1)
2019–2020	United Sly		
2020–2021	Città di Fasano	11	(1)
2021	US Mola		
2021–2022	Città di Massafra		
- * Club domestic league appearances and goals as of 3 November 2018

Enils Nadarević (born 19 July 1987) is a Bosnian former football winger. He last played for Città di Fasano.

== Career ==
Born in Bihać in the former Yugoslavia, Nadarević moved to Italy as a youth in 2005. He signed a contract to play professional football with A.S. Varese 1910, but was initially unable to play for the club due to restrictions on non-EU players in the Serie B. He spent the 2009–10 season on loan at Serie D side A.S.D. Sanvitese.

Shortly after an Italian court ruled that he could play in Serie B, Nadarević made his league debut in a match against Siena on 18 December 2010.

=== Genoa ===
In January 2013 Genoa acquired Nadarević for €300,000 transfer fee. On 16 July he was signed by Serie B club A.C. Cesena in a temporary deal. In January 2014 he left for Bari, which he was sent off during a match and suspended for 3 matches.

=== Trapani ===
On 19 July 2014 Nadarević was signed by Serie B club Trapani in a temporary deal, with an option to purchase outright. On 21 June 2015 Trapani excised the option.

On 28 January 2016 he was signed by Novara in a temporary deal, with an option to purchase outright.

=== Monopoli ===
On 18 December 2016 was signed at Monopoli in Lega Pro.

=== Fidelis Andria ===
On August 20167 it was announced Nadarević signed a 1-year deal with the Serie C side Fidelis Andria.
