= Riccardo Forte =

Italian footballer

Personal information
- Date of birth: 17 May 1999 (age 27)
- Place of birth: Trieste, Italy
- Height: 1.79 m (5 ft 10 in)
- Position: Forward

Team information
- Current team: Pineto

Youth career
- AC Milan

Senior career*
Years	Team	Apps	(Gls)
2017–2020	AC Milan	0	(0)
2018–2019	→ Pistoiese (loan)	33	(3)
2019–2020	→ Piacenza (loan)	4	(0)
2020	→ Lecco (loan)	2	(0)
2020–2021	Cavese	3	(1)
2021	Mestre	17	(5)
2021–2022	Casale	32	(15)
2022	Legnano	11	(3)
2023–2024	Sestri Levante	56	(19)
2024–2026	Campobasso	30	(4)
2025–2026	→ Carpi (loan)	11	(1)
2026	→ Trapani (loan)	5	(1)
2026–	Pineto	0	(0)
- * Club domestic league appearances and goals as of 1 May 2026

Riccardo Forte (born 17 May 1999) is an Italian professional footballer who plays as a forward for Serie C Group B club Pineto.

== Club career ==
=== AC Milan ===
Forte made his professional debut for AC Milan in a 2–0 Europa League loss to HNK Rijeka on 7 December 2017.

==== Loan to Pistoiese ====
On 10 August 2018, Forte was loaned out to Serie C side Pistoiese. On 16 September he made his Serie C debut for Pistoiese as a substitute replacing Jacopo Fanucchi in the 85th minute of a 2–1 away defeat against Pro Patria. Two weeks later, on 30 September, he played his first match as a starter for Pistoiese, a 2–2 home draw against Gozzano, he was replaced Alberto Picchi after 64 minutes. On 9 December he played his first entire match for Pistoiese and he scored his first professional goal in the 7th minute of a 2–1 away defeat against Carrarese. On 23 December he scored his second goal in the 70th minute of a 2–0 home win over Arzachena. On 30 March 2019, Forte scored his third goal, as a substitute, in the 79th minute of a 4–0 away win over Juventus U23. Forte ended his loan to Pistoiese with 33 appearances and 3 goals.

==== Loan to Piacenza and Lecco ====
On 23 August 2019, Forte was sent out on loan for a second consecutive season in Serie C, this time joining Piacenza on a season-long loan deal. Two days later, on 25 August, he made his debut for the club in Serie C as a 86th-minute substitute replacing Luca Cattaneo in a 0–0 away draw against Arzignano Valchiampo. However his loan was terminated during the 2019–20 season winter break and he returned to Milan leaving Piacenza with only 4 appearances, all as a substitute and in Serie C, remaining an unused substitute for 15 other matches.

On 16 January 2020 he was loaned to Serie C club Lecco on a 6-month loan deal until the end of the season. Three days later, on 19 January, he made his debut for the club as a substitute replacing Simone D'Anna in the 71st minute of a 3–2 home win over Novara, and three days later he ade his second appearances for the club, again as a 74th-minute substitute in a 2–2 home draw against Arezzo. However Forte ended his 6-month loan to Lecco with only these 2 appearances, he also remained an unused substitute in 5 other matches.

=== Cavese ===
On 21 September 2020, he moved to Serie C club Cavese on a permanent basis, signing one-year contract with an extension option. Five days later, on 26 September, Forte made his debut for the club as a starter in a 1–0 home defeat against Vibonese, he was replaced by Giuseppe Montaperto after 61 minutes. On 7 October he scored his first goal for Cavese, as a substitute, in the 87th minute of a 3–2 home defeat against Bari.

=== Mestre ===
On 22 February 2021, he joined Serie D club Mestre.

=== Campobasso ===
On 11 July 2024, Forte signed a three-year contract with Campobasso.

== Career statistics ==
=== Club ===
As of 10 October 2020

Club	Season	League			Cup		Europe		Other		Total	
Club	Season	League	Apps	Goals	Apps	Goals	Apps	Goals	Apps	Goals	Apps	Goals
Milan	2017–18	Serie A	0	0	0	0	1 (Note: All appearance(s) in UEFA Europa League)	0	—		1	0
Pistoiese (loan)	2018–19	Serie C	33	3	0	0	—		—		33	3
Piacenza (loan)	2019–20	Serie C	4	0	0	0	—		—		4	0
Lecco (loan)	2019–20	Serie C	2	0	0	0	—		—		2	0
Cavese	2020–21	Serie C	2	1	0	0	—		—		2	1
Career total			41	4	0	0	1	0	—		42	4
