= Domenico Marchiori =

Italian painter (1828–1905)

Domenico Marchiori (1828–1905) was an Italian painter. He was attracted to Neo-Pompeian subject matter.

== Biography ==
Marchiori was born in Lendinara, Province of Rovigo. He studied mathematics at the University of Padua, and came late to painting. He was also active as a parliamentarian (1878–1880), and was a dilettante poet. He studied in Rome at the Accademia del Nudo.

In 1881 at Milan, he exhibited a canvas depicting a Priest of the Ancient Bacchus. In 1884 at Turin, he displayed a portrait in watercolor. In 1887 at Venice, he exhibited a watercolor titled Dal triclinio al cubicolo, and a canvas titled Aspettilo anca ti.

He also painted frescoes for the Palazzo Marchiori in Lendinara, portraits, and an altarpiece for the church in Cavazzana, Rovigo.
