= Colleferro Calcio 1937 =

Italian football club

Colleferro
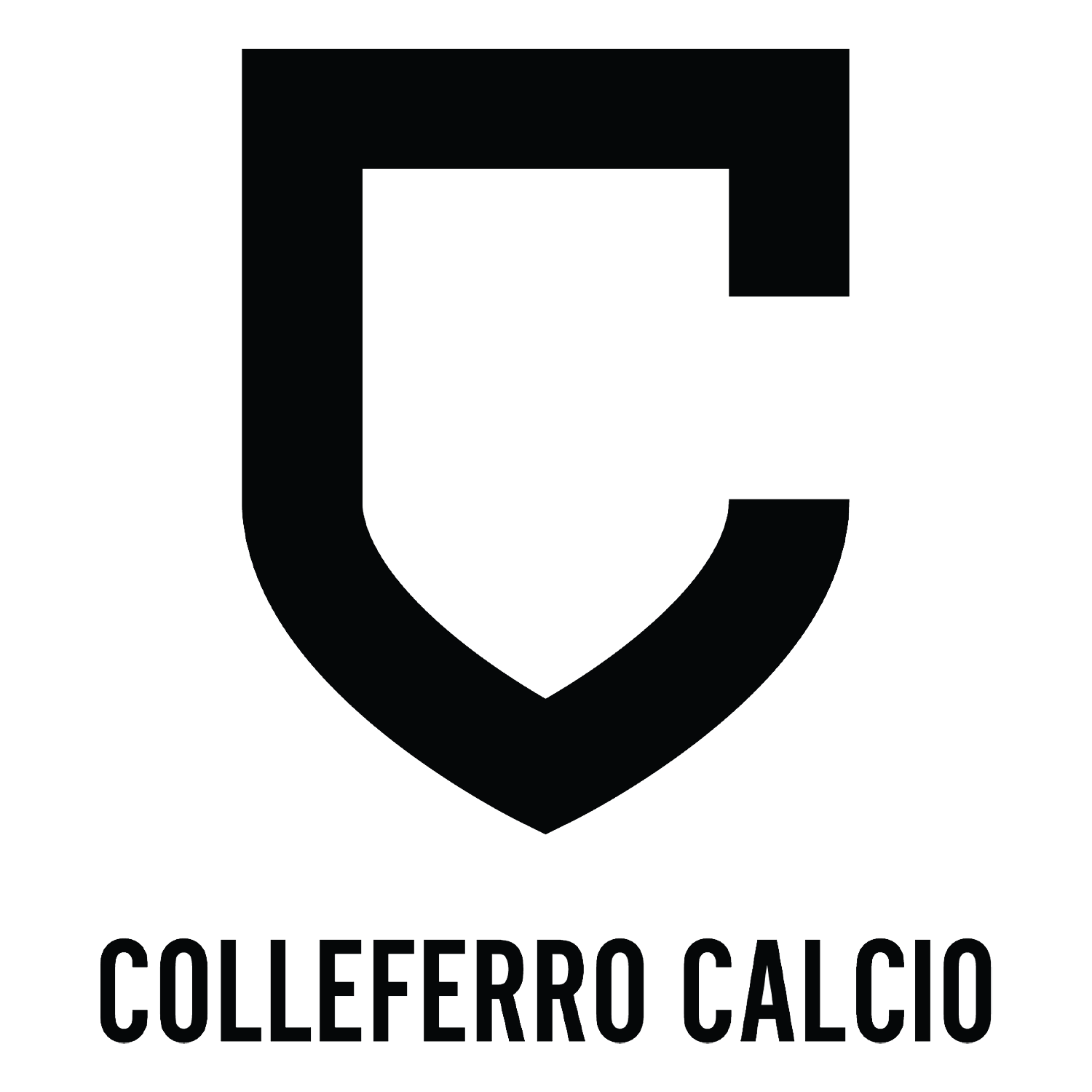
- Full name: Società Sportiva Colleferro Calcio
- Nicknames: Colleferrini; Rossoneri (Red-black)
- Founded: 1937
- Ground: Stadio Andrea Caslini, Colleferro, Italy (974 capacity)
- Chairman: Giorgio Coviello
- Manager: Enrico Baiocco
- League: Eccellenza
- Eccellenza Lazio 2024-25: 8th

The Colleferro Calcio is an Italian football club based in Colleferro (RM), which currently plays in the non-professional league Eccellenza in the Latium region.

== History ==
The team was officially formed in 1937 under the name "Group Company Colleferro BPD", taken from the industrial center of the town. The uniforms reflect the town crest, red and black. After WW2, BPD Colleferro made its name in Italian football quickly climbing all the way to the top of Serie C.

In the '50s, during its tenure in Serie C, BPD Colleferro met several times with A.S. Roma in training matches that the yellowreds played every Thursdays. Several players wore the rossoneri jersey coming from notable teams such as (Scamos from the Pisa) Egidio Guarnacci from Rome and the Fiorentina who also can caount and two caps in National, Caslino by 'Atalanta, Corrado Bernicchi by Sampdoria. Other players like Faliero Mucci, Bruno Di Giulio, Marozzi, Franco Matrigiani Enzo Bovani Franco Papi, Guido Moretti Andrea Caslino became coaches and went into other teams managements. At that time Colleferro played at the BPD ground later named after Maurizio Natali, a footballer who died November 1, 1957, in a car accident after returning from an away game versus Foggia. Up to 4,000 fans could fill the small ground to admire BPD Colleferro taking on giants such as Lecce, Bari, Perugia, Venezia and Cagliari.

BPD Colleferro won the regional amatorial league Promozione in the 1949/50 season after beating Formia in the final in Arezzo, Tuscany. This final had to be repeated as fans invaded the pitch in Rome causing the game suspension. The rossoneri were promoted in serie C.

The newly promoted underdogs played their best season of their history, missing out the Serie B for just 9 points. The team was top of the league up to the arrival of the influential Hungarian midfielder Tibor Garay, also former Inter Milan, who allegedly created discontents inside the dressing room causing poor results. Colleferro ended third, but with the most prolific attack (83 goals in 38 games).

In the following season BPD Colleferro ended in a respectable mid table position but it was relegated to the newly formed Fourth Division (IV Serie) as Serie C reduced its groups. The season 1954/55 saw Colleferro winning the "Amateur Championship" (Fourth Division rebranded as Serie D) beating Mestrina after two repeats held at Stadio Flaminio in Rome. That same year, managed by Masetti, Bpd Colleferro was back in Serie C, overcoming Siena in two legged games which saw 2,000 Colleferro fans travelling to Tuscany.

Colleferro closed the next season level with Pavia in 14th place. One of them had to be relegated. Colleferro lost to Pavia in the play-out final in Florence and returned to Serie D.

In the 1960s the team navigated again in Serie D (series IV) missing out a return in Series C several times by losing crucial play off games.

In the 70s the industrial group of BPD abandoned the administration of the team which changed its name to "Sport Group Colleferro Football" and continued to play in inter-regional division (former Serie D).

While the first team slowly declined, the youth sector developed with homegrown players leaving to top teams such as Mark Sangiorgi (Avellino), Massimo Sciarra (Ternana), Mauro Raffin (Sampdoria) and Claudio Brai and Maurizio Girardi (Lazio). During the 80s and 90s, the team played in the regional championship of Promozione, continuing to maintain a strong youth development with the likes of Giampaolo Saurini Simone Lucchini, Natale Gonnella and Cristian Biancone. The youth team in the category "students (coached by Franco Matrigiani) won the regional championships and one in category "Junior ", coached by Faliero Mucci, did the same season in 1986/87 and 1987/88, until reaching the semifinals of national championship in their class.

The following decades see Colleferro stagnating in the regional leagues with the lowest point reached by being relegated in 1a Categoria, then bouncing back going through Promozione and up in Eccellenza. In the Season 1999/2000 Colleferro was promoted again in Eccellenza and 2001/02 was close to playoffs for a promotion Serie D.

In 2003 the team changed its name again, this time as "S. S. Colleferro Football" and is taken over by the Mandova, who revamped the management team and introduced players with experience. The club also continues to play animportant role in the youth leagues and it also includes two teams (men and women) of Football 5 a side.

Silverwares filled the club cabinet at the beginning of this decade. Under the ownership of Amerigo Talone and the managing of Enrico Baiocco, in 2010 Colleferro wins the Promozione Italian Cup beating La Sabina in Guidonia.

In 2013 the more prestigious Eccellenza Italian Cup is won, after a tense final played in Cisterna which saw the rossoneri prevailing over a nervous Atletico Boville Ernica.

These two wins in three seasons made Colleferro the only club in the region to have won both Promozione and Eccellenza Italian Cup.

The latter win allowed Colleferro to play the national amatorial Italian cup competition. A historic moment since Colleferro hadn't played outside the region for 30 years.

== Grounds ==
- '20s – mid '30s : Colleferro Scalo BPD ground
- Mid '30s – 1989 : Stadio BPD, later named Natali, holding about 4,000 spectators. It was built with a main stand, covered and an uncovered stand opposite. Demolished and now used as car park.
- 1989–1993 : Stadio Via degli Atleti, grass with running track, covered stands, holding about 2,500 fans. Ground shared with the local rugby team.
- 1993–1998 : Campo Colle Sant'Antonino, soil, holding up to 1,000 people. Nowadays it is used by youth football and minirugby teams and it has artificial turf.
- 1998–current : Campo Caslini, artificial turf, 963 seats, covered stands.

== Honours ==
- Scudetto Dilettanti: 1
  1954–1955

=== Regional trophies ===
- Coppa Italia Promozione Lazio: 1
  2010-2011
- Coppa Italia Eccellenza Lazio: 1
  2012-2013

=== Important placements ===
- Prima Divisione

third: 1940–1941

- Serie C

third: 1950–1951

- Serie D

second: 1960–1961
third: 1961–1962

- Eccellenza

third: 2000-2001, 2022-2023

== Chronicle ==
History of Club football Colleferro

- 1937 - Born the Group Corporate B.P.D. Colleferro.
- 1937-38 - In 1.a Divisione Laziale.
- 1938-39 - In 1.a Divisione Laziale.
- 1939-40 - In 1.a Divisione Laziale.
- 1940-41 - In 1.a Divisione Laziale.
- 1941-42 - In 1.a Divisione Laziale. Promoted in Serie C.
- 1942-43 - 9th in girone L della Serie C.
- 1943-44 - Activities suspended due to war.
- 1944-45 - Activities suspended due to war
- 1945-46 - 14th in group C della Serie C Centro-Sud. Relegated in 1.a Divisione Laziale.
- 1946-47 - In 1.a Divisione Laziale.
- 1947-48 - In 1.a Divisione Laziale.
- 1948-49 - 14th in girone I della Promozione Interregionale (Lega Interr. Centro).
- 1949-50 - 1st in girone I della Promozione Interregionale. Promoted in Serie C.
- 1950-51 - 3rd in group C di Serie C.
- 1951-52 - 14th in group D di Serie C. Relegated in IV Serie.
- 1952-53 - 2nd tied in with the first ounti girone G di IV Serie. Loses play off with Avellino (Caserta, 3/5/'53: Avellino-B.P.D. Colleferro 2–0).
- 1953-54 - 1st in group F di IV Serie. Loses on playoffs. Not promoted in Serie C.
- 1954-55 - 1st in group F di IV Serie. Promoted in Serie C after winning play off finals .
- 1955-56 - 16th in Serie C. Recedes in IV Serie. loses playout to stay in Serie C at Firenze versus the Pavia per 1 a 0.
- 1956-57 - 4th in group F di IV Serie.
- 1957-58 - 10th in Interregionale di I Serie.
- 1958-59 - 3rd in group F di IV Serie.
- 1959-60 - 4th in group F di Serie D.
- 1960-61 - 2nd in group D di Serie D.
- 1961-62 - 3rd in group D di Serie D.
- 1962-63 - 12th in group D di Serie D.
- 1963-64 - 10th in group E di Serie D.
- 1964-65 - 11th in group D di Serie D.
- 1965-66 - 10th in group D di Serie D.
- 1966-67 - 16th in group D di Serie D.
- 1967-68 - 17th in group F di Serie D, relegated in Promozione Laziale.
- 1968-69 - 10° in group B di Prima Categoria.
- 1969-70 - 7° in group B di Prima Categoria, took the name SNIA Colleferro.
- 1970-71 - 7° in group B della Promozione Laziale.
- 1971-72 - 8th in group B della Promozione Laziale.
- 1972-73 - 7th in group B della Promozione Laziale.
- 1973-74 - 12th in group B della Promozione Laziale.
- 1974-75 - 11th in group B della Promozione Laziale.
- 1975-76 - 7th in group B della Promozione Laziale.
- 1976-77 - 5th in group C della Promozione Laziale.
- 1977-78 - in group C della Promozione Laziale.
- 1980-81 - 4° in group A della Promozione Laziale. Promoted after repechage in Interregionale.
- 1981-82 - 11th in group H dell'Interregionale.
- 1982-83 - 15th in group H dell'Interregionale, relegated in Promozione Laziale.
- 1983-84 - 12th in group B della Promozione Laziale.
- 1984-85 - 13th in group B della Promozione Laziale.
- 1985-86 - 5th in group B della Promozione Laziale.
- 1986-87 - 15th in group B della Promozione Laziale, relegated in 1.a Categoria Laziale, took the name of Gruppo Sportivo Colleferro.
- 1987-88 - In 1.a Categoria Laziale.
- 1988-89 - 1st in 1.a Categoria Laziale. promoted in Promozione Laziale.
- 1989-90 - 10th in group C della Promozione Laziale.
- 1990-91 - 11th in group C della Promozione Laziale.
- 1991-92 - 17th in group C della Promozione Laziale. From 1994 took the name S.S.Colleferro Calcio.
- 1993-94 - 15° in group C della Promozione Laziale.
- 1997-98 - 11th in group D della Promozione Laziale.
- 1998-99 - 1st in group D of Promozione Laziale. Promosso in Eccellenza.
- 1999-00 - 7th in group B of Eccellenza Laziale.
- 2000-01 - 3rd in group B of Eccellenza Laziale.
- 2001-02 - 11th in group B of Eccellenza Laziale.
- 2002-03 - 15th in group B of Eccellenza Laziale.
- 2003-04 - 9th in group B of Eccellenza Laziale.
- 2004-05 - 4th in group B of Eccellenza Laziale.
- 2005-06 - 14th in group B of Eccellenza Laziale.
- 2006-07 - 14th in group B of Eccellenza Laziale.
- 2007-08 - 13th in group B of Eccellenza Laziale.
- 2008-09 - 14th in group B of Eccellenza Laziale.
- 2009-10 - 16th in group B di Eccellenza Laziale. Relegated in Promozione
- 2010-11 - 3° in group D of Promozione Laziale. Wins the Promozione Italian Cup. Promoted to Eccellenza
- 2011-12 -10th in group B of Eccellenza Laziale.
- 2012-13 -Group B of Eccellenza Laziale.Wins the Eccellenza Italian Cup

== National championships ==
Category	Holdings	Debut	Last season
C	5	1942-1943	1955-1956
D	19	1948-1949	1982-1983
Eccellenza/Promozione	50	1937-1938	2023-2024
