= Alberto Marchiori =

Italian footballer (born 1993)

Personal information
- Date of birth: 11 May 1993 (age 33)
- Place of birth: Camposampiero, Italy
- Height: 1.95 m (6 ft 5 in)
- Position: Centre back

Team information
- Current team: Bassano

Senior career*
Years	Team	Apps	(Gls)
2013–2015	Genoa	1	(0)
2013–2014	→ Vicenza (loan)	11	(0)
2014–2015	→ Mantova (loan)	16	(0)
2015–2016	Pro Patria	8	(0)
2016–2017	Triestina	19	(3)
2017–2018	Treviso		
2018–2019	Luparense	25	(1)
2019–2020	San Donà		(1)
2021	Montebelluna	17	(0)
2021–2022	Este	22	(2)
2022–	Bassano	1	(0)
- * Club domestic league appearances and goals as of 17 September 2023

Alberto Marchiori (born 11 May 1993) is an Italian footballer who plays as a centre back for Serie D club Bassano.

In summer 2013 Marchiori left for Vicenza, with youngster Alessio Benedetti moved to opposite direction.

In July 2021, Alberto Marchiori signed with Este to play in Serie D, which is the fourth tier of the Italian league system.
