= 1942 Coppa Italia final =

8th Coppa Italia final
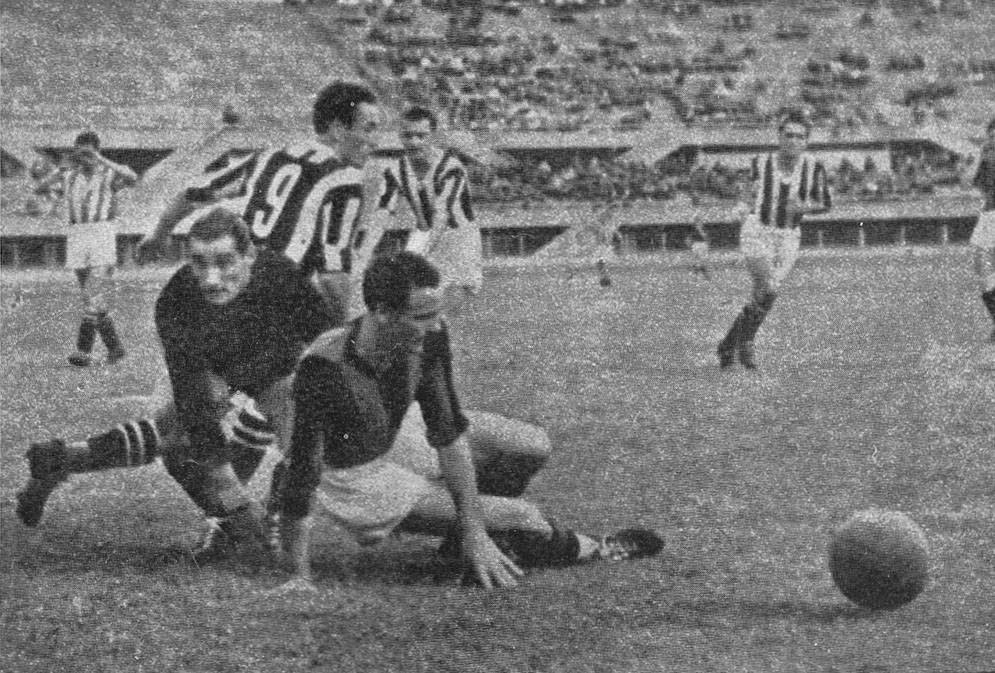
- A Juventus' assault in the Milano's area, during the retour match in Turin.
- Event: 1941–42 Coppa Italia
| Milano | Juventus |
| 2 | 5 |

First leg
| Milano | Juventus |
| 1 | 1 |
- Date: 21 June 1942
- Venue: San Siro, Milan
- Referee: Generoso Dattilo

Second leg
| Juventus | Milano |
| 4 | 1 |
- Date: 28 June 1942
- Venue: Stadio Benito Mussolini, Turin
- Referee: Giovanni Galeati

The 1942 Coppa Italia final was the final of the 1941–42 Coppa Italia. It was held on 21 and 28 June 1942 between Milano and Juventus. The first leg, played in Milan, ended 1–1; the second leg was played seven days later in Turin, where hometown team won 4–1.

== First leg ==
21 June 1942

| Milano | 1–1 | Juventus |
|---|---|---|
| Cappello 83' | | Bellini 37' |

San Siro, Milan
Referee: Generoso Dattilo

| Milano | Juventus |

| GK | 1 | (Italy) Giovanni Rossetti |
| DF | 2 | (Italy) Enrico Boniforti |
| DF | 3 | (Italy) Dante Guagnetti |
| MF | 4 | (Italy) Giuseppe Antonini |
| MF | 5 | (Italy) Leandro Remondini |
| MF | 6 | (Italy) Gianni Toppan |
| FW | 7 | (Italy) Piero Trapanelli |
| FW | 8 | (Italy) Giuseppe Meazza |
| FW | 9 | (Italy) Gino Cappello |
| FW | 10 | (Italy) Giorgio Granata |
| FW | 11 | (Italy) Luigi Rosellini |
Manager:
(Italy) Mario Magnozzi

| GK | 1 | (Italy) Giuseppe Peruchetti |
| DF | 2 | (Italy) Alfredo Foni |
| DF | 3 | (Italy) Pietro Rava |
| MF | 4 | (Italy) Teobaldo Depetrini |
| MF | 5 | (Italy) Carlo Parola |
| MF | 6 | (Italy) Ugo Locatelli |
| FW | 7 | (Italy) Lelio Colaneri |
| FW | 8 | (Italy) Giovanni Varglien II |
| FW | 9 | (Albania) Riza Lushta |
| FW | 10 | (Italy) Vittorio Sentimenti |
| FW | 11 | (Italy) Savino Bellini |
Manager:
(Argentina) (Italy) Luis Monti

== Second leg ==
28 June 1942

| Juventus | 4–1 | Milano |
|---|---|---|
| Lushta 29', 69', 71'; Sentimenti 34' (pen.) | | Boffi 56' |

Stadio Benito Mussolini, Turin
Referee: Giovanni Galeati

| Juventus | Milano |

| GK | 1 | (Italy) Giuseppe Peruchetti |
| DF | 2 | (Italy) Alfredo Foni |
| DF | 3 | (Italy) Pietro Rava |
| MF | 4 | (Italy) Teobaldo Depetrini |
| MF | 5 | (Italy) Carlo Parola |
| MF | 6 | (Italy) Ugo Locatelli |
| FW | 7 | (Italy) Lelio Colaneri |
| FW | 8 | (Italy) Giovanni Varglien II |
| FW | 9 | (Albania) Riza Lushta |
| FW | 10 | (Italy) Vittorio Sentimenti |
| FW | 11 | (Italy) Savino Bellini |
Manager:
(Argentina) (Italy) Luis Monti

| GK | 1 | (Italy) Giovanni Rossetti |
| DF | 2 | (Italy) Enrico Boniforti |
| DF | 3 | (Italy) Dante Guagnetti |
| MF | 4 | (Italy) Giuseppe Antonini |
| MF | 5 | (Italy) Leandro Remondini |
| MF | 6 | (Italy) Gianni Toppan |
| FW | 7 | (Italy) Piero Trapanelli |
| FW | 8 | (Italy) Paolo Todeschini |
| FW | 9 | (Italy) Aldo Boffi |
| FW | 10 | (Italy) Gino Cappello |
| FW | 11 | (Italy) Luigi Rosellini |
Manager:
(Italy) Mario Magnozzi

== See also ==
- Juventus FC–AC Milan rivalry

Played between same clubs:

- 1973 Coppa Italia final
- 1990 Coppa Italia final
- 2016 Coppa Italia final
- 2018 Coppa Italia final
