= Juventus FC–AC Milan rivalry =

Football derby between Juventus and Milan

Juventus–Milan rivalry
- Juventus Milan
- Location: Northwest Italy
- First meeting: 28 April 1901; Italian Football Championship; Juventus 2–3 Milan
- Latest meeting: 6 September 2026; Serie A Juventus 1–1 Milan
- Next meeting: 31 January 2027; Serie A Milan v Juventus
- Stadiums: Allianz Stadium (Juventus); San Siro (Milan)

Statistics
- Total meetings: Official matches: 247; Unofficial matches: 64; Total matches: 311
- Most wins: Official matches: Juventus (94); Unofficial matches: Milan (31); Total matches: Juventus (115)
- Largest victory: Milan 8–1 Juventus; Italian Football Championship (14 January 1912)

Juventus	Milan

The Juventus FC–AC Milan rivalry is the oldest running italian football rivalry and one of its most played matches, having taken place for the first time in an official game in 1901. Both Juventus and Milan rank among the most successful clubs in Italy, the first for being the most successful team domestically and the latter on the international stage. From a historical point of view, they are both held to similar standards, consequently making them direct competitors to reach the same goals or honours more often than not.

== Official match results ==
Dates are in dd/mm/yyyy form

- SF = Semi-final
- QF = Quarter-final
- R16 = Round of 16
- R32 = Round of 32
- GS = Group stage
- R1 = Round 1
- R2 = Round 2

Juventus win Draw Milan win

Season	Competition	Date	Home team	Result	Away team
1901	Prima Categoria	28 April 1901	Juventus	2–3	Milan
1903	Prima Categoria	22 March 1903	Milan	0–2	Juventus
1904	Prima Categoria	13 March 1904	Milan	1–1	Juventus
1904	Prima Categoria	20 March 1904	Milan	0–3	Juventus
1906	Prima Categoria	11 March 1906	Juventus	2–1	Milan
1906	Prima Categoria	22 April 1906	Milan	1–0	Juventus
1906	Prima Categoria	29 April 1906	Juventus	0–0	Milan
1906	Prima Categoria	6 May 1906	Milan	2–0	Juventus
1909–10	Prima Categoria	16 January 1910	Juventus	5–3	Milan
1909–10	Prima Categoria	23 January 1910	Milan	0–1	Juventus
1910–11	Prima Categoria	29 January 1911	Juventus	0–2	Milan
1910–11	Prima Categoria	23 April 1911	Milan	3–0	Juventus
1911–12	Prima Categoria	29 October 1911	Juventus	0–4	Milan
1911–12	Prima Categoria	14 January 1912	Milan	8–1	Juventus
1913–14	Prima Categoria	1 November 1913	Milan	3–1	Juventus
1913–14	Prima Categoria	25 January 1914	Juventus	2–1	Milan
1921–22	Prima Categoria	16 October 1921	Milan	1–3	Juventus
1921–22	Prima Categoria	9 April 1922	Juventus	0–0	Milan
1922–23	Prima Divisione	7 January 1923	Juventus	2–2	Milan
1922–23	Prima Divisione	22 April 1923	Milan	0–0	Juventus
1924–25	Prima Divisione	26 October 1924	Juventus	5–3	Milan
1924–25	Prima Divisione	22 February 1925	Milan	0–0	Juventus
1925–26	Prima Divisione	25 October 1925	Juventus	6–0	Milan
1925–26	Prima Divisione	28 March 1926	Milan	1–2	Juventus
1926–27	Divisione Nazionale	15 May 1927	Milan	0–2	Juventus
1926–27	Divisione Nazionale	10 July 1927	Juventus	8–2	Milan
1927–28	Divisione Nazionale	11 March 1928	Juventus	0–1	Milan
1927–28	Divisione Nazionale	24 June 1928	Milan	3–1	Juventus
1929–30	Serie A	8 December 1929	Juventus	3–1	Milan
1929–30	Serie A	4 May 1930	Milan	1–1	Juventus
1930–31	Serie A	5 October 1930	Milan	0–3	Juventus
1930–31	Serie A	15 February 1931	Juventus	3–3	Milan
1931–32	Serie A	11 October 1931	Juventus	2–0	Milan
1931–32	Serie A	28 February 1932	Milan	0–0	Juventus
1932–33	Serie A	22 January 1933	Milan	1–1	Juventus
1932–33	Serie A	11 June 1933	Juventus	3–0	Milan
1933–34	Serie A	10 December 1933	Milan	3–1	Juventus
1933–34	Serie A	22 April 1934	Juventus	4–0	Milan
1934–35	Serie A	20 January 1934	Juventus	1–0	Milan
1934–35	Serie A	19 May 1935	Milan	3–0	Juventus
1935–36	Serie A	22 December 1935	Juventus	3–1	Milan
1935–36	Serie A	19 April 1936	Milan	2–1	Juventus
1936–37	Serie A	27 December 1936	Milan	3–4	Juventus
1936–37	Serie A	2 May 1937	Juventus	2–0	Milan
1937–38	Serie A	9 January 1938	Juventus	2–0	Milan
1937–38	Serie A	24 April 1938	Milan	1–1	Juventus
1938–39	Serie A	1 January 1939	Juventus	2–2	Milan
1938–39	Serie A	23 April 1939	Milan	0–0	Juventus
1939–40	Serie A	5 November 1939	Juventus	2–2	Milan
1939–40	Serie A	17 March 1940	Milan	1–2	Juventus
1940–41	Serie A	12 January 1941	Milan	2–2	Juventus
1940–41	Serie A	27 April 1941	Juventus	1–2	Milan
1941–42	Serie A	16 November 1941	Juventus	3–2	Milan
1941–42	Serie A	8 March 1942	Milan	1–1	Juventus
1941–42	Coppa Italia final	21 June 1942	Milan	1–1	Juventus
1941–42	Coppa Italia final	28 June 1942	Juventus	4–1	Milan
1942–43	Serie A	4 October 1942	Juventus	1–1	Milan
1942–43	Serie A	17 January 1943	Milan	2–0	Juventus
1945–46	Serie A-B	21 October 1945	Milan	1–1	Juventus
1945–46	Serie A-B	30 January 1946	Juventus	2–2	Milan
1945–46	Serie A-B	26 May 1946	Milan	1–1	Juventus
1945–46	Serie A-B	14 July 1946	Juventus	3–1	Milan
1946–47	Serie A	6 October 1946	Milan	3–3	Juventus
1946–47	Serie A	2 March 1947	Juventus	1–2	Milan
1947–48	Serie A	7 December 1947	Milan	5–0	Juventus
1947–48	Serie A	6 May 1948	Juventus	2–1	Milan
1948–49	Serie A	28 November 1948	Milan	1–1	Juventus
1948–49	Serie A	10 April 1949	Juventus	1–1	Milan
1949–50	Serie A	2 October 1949	Milan	0–1	Juventus
1949–50	Serie A	5 February 1950	Juventus	1–7	Milan
1950–51	Serie A	22 October 1950	Juventus	1–1	Milan
1950–51	Serie A	4 March 1951	Milan	2–0	Juventus
1951–52	Serie A	16 December 1951	Milan	1–1	Juventus
1951–52	Serie A	4 May 1952	Juventus	3–1	Milan
1952–53	Serie A	7 December 1952	Juventus	0–3	Milan
1952–53	Serie A	12 April 1953	Milan	1–2	Juventus
1953–54	Serie A	20 December 1953	Milan	1–0	Juventus
1953–54	Serie A	2 May 1954	Juventus	1–0	Milan
1954–55	Serie A	2 January 1955	Juventus	3–4	Milan
1954–55	Serie A	15 May 1955	Milan	3–1	Juventus
1955–56	Serie A	26 December 1955	Milan	3–1	Juventus
1955–56	Serie A	6 May 1956	Juventus	0–0	Milan
1956–57	Serie A	25 November 1956	Juventus	0–1	Milan
1956–57	Serie A	31 March 1957	Milan	4–1	Juventus
1957–58	Serie A	20 October 1957	Milan	1–1	Juventus
1957–58	Serie A	9 March 1958	Juventus	1–0	Milan
1958–59	Serie A	16 November 1958	Juventus	4–5	Milan
1958–59	Serie A	29 March 1959	Milan	1–1	Juventus
1959–60	Serie A	10 January 1960	Milan	0–2	Juventus
1959–60	Serie A	15 May 1960	Juventus	3–1	Milan
1960–61	Serie A	6 November 1960	Juventus	3–4	Milan
1960–61	Serie A	12 March 1961	Milan	3–1	Juventus
1961–62	Serie A	12 November 1961	Milan	5–1	Juventus
1961–62	Serie A	11 March 1962	Juventus	2–4	Milan
1962–63	Serie A	18 November 1962	Juventus	1–0	Milan
1962–63	Serie A	31 March 1963	Milan	0–0	Juventus
1963–64	Serie A	24 November 1963	Milan	2–2	Juventus
1963–64	Serie A	5 April 1964	Juventus	1–2	Milan
1964–65	Serie A	13 December 1964	Juventus	2–2	Milan
1964–65	Serie A	25 April 1965	Milan	1–0	Juventus
1965–66	Serie A	19 December 1965	Milan	2–1	Juventus
1965–66	Serie A	24 April 1966	Juventus	3–0	Milan
1966–67	Serie A	24 December 1966	Juventus	1–1	Milan
1966–67	Serie A	30 April 1967	Milan	3–1	Juventus
1966–67	Coppa Italia SF	7 June 1967	Juventus	1–2 (Note: Milan won 2–1 in extra time.)	Milan
1967–68	Serie A	29 October 1967	Milan	0–0	Juventus
1967–68	Serie A	24 February 1968	Juventus	1–2	Milan
1968–69	Serie A	8 December 1968	Juventus	0–1	Milan
1968–69	Serie A	13 April 1969	Milan	1–0	Juventus
1969–70	Serie A	7 December 1969	Milan	0–2	Juventus
1969–70	Serie A	29 March 1970	Juventus	3–0	Milan
1970–71	Serie A	25 October 1970	Juventus	0–2	Milan
1970–71	Serie A	28 February 1971	Milan	1–1	Juventus
1971–72	Serie A	31 October 1971	Milan	1–4	Juventus
1971–72	Serie A	20 February 1972	Juventus	1–1	Milan
1971–72	Coppa Italia R2	11 June 1972	Juventus	0–1	Milan
1971–72	Coppa Italia R2	1 July 1972	Milan	3–2	Juventus
1972–73	Serie A	29 October 1972	Juventus	2–2	Milan
1972–73	Serie A	18 February 1973	Milan	2–2	Juventus
1972–73	Coppa Italia final	1 July 1973	Juventus	1–1 (Note: Milan won 5–2 on penalties.)	Milan
1973–74	Serie A	25 November 1973	Milan	2–2	Juventus
1973–74	Serie A	17 March 1974	Juventus	2–0	Milan
1974–75	Serie A	13 October 1974	Juventus	2–1	Milan
1974–75	Serie A	9 February 1975	Milan	0–2	Juventus
1974–75	Coppa Italia R2	12 June 1975	Milan	1–0	Juventus
1974–75	Coppa Italia R2	22 June 1975	Juventus	2–1	Milan

Season	Competition	Date	Home team	Result	Away team
1975–76	Serie A	16 November 1975	Milan	0–1	Juventus
1975–76	Serie A	14 March 1976	Juventus	1–1	Milan
1976–77	Serie A	7 November 1976	Milan	2–3	Juventus
1976–77	Serie A	13 March 1977	Juventus	2–1	Milan
1977–78	Serie A	25 September 1977	Juventus	1–1	Milan
1977–78	Serie A	12 February 1978	Milan	0–0	Juventus
1977–78	Coppa Italia R2	17 May 1978	Juventus	0–3	Milan
1977–78	Coppa Italia R2	4 June 1978	Milan	4–2	Juventus
1978–79	Serie A	5 November 1978	Juventus	1–0	Milan
1978–79	Serie A	11 March 1979	Milan	0–0	Juventus
1979–80	Serie A	7 October 1979	Milan	2–1	Juventus
1979–80	Serie A	3 February 1980	Juventus	2–1	Milan
1981–82	Serie A	4 October 1981	Milan	0–1	Juventus
1981–82	Serie A	14 February 1982	Juventus	3–2	Milan
1982–83	Coppa Italia R1	1 September 1982	Juventus	2–1	Milan
1983–84	Serie A	9 October 1983	Juventus	2–1	Milan
1983–84	Serie A	19 February 1984	Milan	0–3	Juventus
1984–85	Serie A	7 October 1984	Juventus	1–1	Milan
1984–85	Serie A	17 February 1985	Milan	3–2	Juventus
1984–85	Coppa Italia QF	12 June 1985	Milan	0–0	Juventus
1984–85	Coppa Italia QF	19 June 1985	Juventus	0–1	Milan
1985–86	Serie A	15 December 1985	Milan	0–0	Juventus
1985–86	Serie A	20 April 1986	Juventus	1–0	Milan
1986–87	Serie A	5 October 1986	Juventus	0–0	Milan
1986–87	Serie A	22 February 1987	Milan	1–1	Juventus
1987–88	Serie A	10 January 1988	Juventus	0–1	Milan
1987–88	Serie A	8 May 1988	Milan	0–0	Juventus
1988–89	Serie A	30 October 1988	Juventus	0–0	Milan
1988–89	Serie A	12 March 1989	Milan	4–0	Juventus
1989–90	Serie A	5 November 1989	Milan	3–2	Juventus
1989–90	Coppa Italia final	28 February 1990	Juventus	0–0	Milan
1989–90	Serie A	11 March 1990	Juventus	3–0	Milan
1989–90	Coppa Italia final	25 April 1990	Milan	0–1	Juventus
1990–91	Serie A	30 December 1990	Milan	2–0	Juventus
1990–91	Serie A	5 May 1991	Juventus	0–3	Milan
1991–92	Serie A	15 September 1991	Juventus	1–1	Milan
1991–92	Serie A	9 February 1992	Milan	1–1	Juventus
1991–92	Coppa Italia SF	31 March 1992	Milan	0–0	Juventus
1991–92	Coppa Italia SF	14 April 1992	Juventus	1–0	Milan
1992–93	Serie A	29 November 1992	Juventus	0–1	Milan
1992–93	Serie A	17 April 1993	Milan	1–3	Juventus
1993–94	Serie A	24 October 1993	Milan	1–1	Juventus
1993–94	Serie A	6 March 1994	Juventus	0–1	Milan
1994–95	Serie A	30 October 1994	Juventus	1–0	Milan
1994–95	Serie A	1 April 1995	Milan	0–2	Juventus
1995–96	Serie A	15 October 1995	Milan	2–1	Juventus
1995–96	Serie A	25 February 1996	Juventus	1–1	Milan
1996–97	Serie A	17 November 1996	Juventus	0–0	Milan
1996–97	Serie A	6 April 1997	Milan	1–6	Juventus
1997–98	Serie A	30 November 1997	Milan	1–1	Juventus
1997–98	Serie A	28 March 1998	Juventus	4–1	Milan
1998–99	Serie A	6 January 1999	Milan	1–1	Juventus
1998–99	Serie A	9 May 1999	Juventus	0–2	Milan
1999–2000	Serie A	21 November 1999	Juventus	3–1	Milan
1999–2000	Serie A	24 March 2000	Milan	2–0	Juventus
2000–01	Serie A	22 October 2000	Milan	2–2	Juventus
2000–01	Serie A	25 February 2001	Juventus	3–0	Milan
2001–02	Serie A	9 December 2001	Milan	1–1	Juventus
2001–02	Coppa Italia SF	23 January 2002	Milan	1–2	Juventus
2001–02	Coppa Italia SF	6 February 2002	Juventus	1–1	Milan
2001–02	Serie A	14 April 2002	Juventus	1–0	Milan
2002–03	Serie A	10 November 2002	Juventus	2–1	Milan
2002–03	Serie A	22 March 2003	Milan	2–1	Juventus
2002–03	Champions League final	28 May 2003	Juventus	0–0 (Note: Milan won 3–2 on penalties.)	Milan
2003–04	Supercoppa Italiana	3 August 2003	Juventus	1–1 (Note: Juventus won 5–3 on penalties.)	Milan
2003–04	Serie A	1 November 2003	Milan	1–1	Juventus
2003–04	Serie A	14 March 2004	Juventus	1–3	Milan
2004–05	Serie A	18 December 2004	Juventus	0–0	Milan
2004–05	Serie A	8 May 2005	Milan	0–1	Juventus
2005–06	Serie A	30 October 2005	Milan	3–1	Juventus
2005–06	Serie A	12 March 2006	Juventus	0–0	Milan
2007–08	Serie A	1 December 2007	Milan	0–0	Juventus
2007–08	Serie A	12 April 2008	Juventus	3–2	Milan
2008–09	Serie A	12 December 2008	Juventus	4–2	Milan
2008–09	Serie A	10 May 2009	Milan	1–1	Juventus
2009–10	Serie A	10 January 2010	Juventus	0–3	Milan
2009–10	Serie A	15 May 2010	Milan	3–0	Juventus
2010–11	Serie A	30 October 2010	Milan	1–2	Juventus
2010–11	Serie A	5 March 2011	Juventus	0–1	Milan
2011–12	Serie A	2 October 2011	Juventus	2–0	Milan
2011–12	Coppa Italia SF	8 February 2012	Milan	1–2	Juventus
2011–12	Serie A	25 February 2012	Milan	1–1	Juventus
2011–12	Coppa Italia SF	20 March 2012	Juventus	2–2 (Note: After extra time)	Milan
2012–13	Serie A	25 November 2012	Milan	1–0	Juventus
2012–13	Coppa Italia QF	9 January 2013	Juventus	2–1 (Note: Juventus won 2–1 in extra time.)	Milan
2012–13	Serie A	21 April 2013	Juventus	1–0	Milan
2013–14	Serie A	6 October 2013	Juventus	3–2	Milan
2013–14	Serie A	5 February 2014	Milan	0–2	Juventus
2014–15	Serie A	20 September 2014	Milan	0–1	Juventus
2014–15	Serie A	7 February 2015	Juventus	3–1	Milan
2015–16	Serie A	21 November 2015	Juventus	1–0	Milan
2015–16	Serie A	9 April 2016	Milan	1–2	Juventus
2015–16	Coppa Italia final	21 May 2016	Juventus	1–0 (Note: Juventus won 1–0 in extra time.)	Milan
2016–17	Serie A	22 October 2016	Milan	1–0	Juventus
2016–17	Supercoppa Italiana	23 December 2016	Juventus	1–1 (Note: Milan won 4–3 on penalties.)	Milan
2016–17	Coppa Italia QF	25 January 2017	Juventus	2–1	Milan
2016–17	Serie A	10 March 2017	Juventus	2–1	Milan
2017–18	Serie A	28 October 2017	Milan	0–2	Juventus
2017–18	Serie A	31 March 2018	Juventus	3–1	Milan
2017–18	Coppa Italia final	9 May 2018	Juventus	4–0	Milan
2018–19	Serie A	11 November 2018	Milan	0–2	Juventus
2018–19	Supercoppa Italiana	16 January 2019	Juventus	1–0	Milan
2018–19	Serie A	6 April 2019	Juventus	2–1	Milan
2019–20	Serie A	10 November 2019	Juventus	1–0	Milan
2019–20	Coppa Italia SF	13 February 2020	Milan	1–1	Juventus
2019–20	Coppa Italia SF	12 June 2020	Juventus	0–0	Milan
2019–20	Serie A	7 July 2020	Milan	4–2	Juventus
2020–21	Serie A	6 January 2021	Milan	1–3	Juventus
2020–21	Serie A	9 May 2021	Juventus	0–3	Milan
2021–22	Serie A	19 September 2021	Juventus	1–1	Milan
2021–22	Serie A	23 January 2022	Milan	0–0	Juventus
2022–23	Serie A	8 October 2022	Milan	2–0	Juventus
2022–23	Serie A	28 May 2023	Juventus	0–1	Milan
2023–24	Serie A	22 October 2023	Milan	0–1	Juventus
2023–24	Serie A	27 April 2024	Juventus	0–0	Milan
2024–25	Serie A	23 November 2024	Milan	0–0	Juventus
2024–25	Supercoppa Italiana SF	3 January 2025	Juventus	1–2	Milan
2024–25	Serie A	18 January 2025	Juventus	2–0	Milan
2025–26	Serie A	5 October 2025	Juventus	0–0	Milan
2025–26	Serie A	26 April 2026	Milan	0–0	Juventus
2026–27	Serie A	6 September 2026	Juventus	1–1	Milan
2026–27	Serie A	31 January 2027	Milan		Juventus

== Statistics ==
As of 6 September 2026

Competition	Matches	Juventus wins	Draws	Milan wins	Juventus goals	Milan goals
Prima Categoria	18	7	3	8	23	33
Prima Divisione	6	3	3	0	15	6
Divisione Nazionale	8	3	3	2	18	11
Serie A	183	69	61	53	247	228
Total league matches	215	82	70	63	303	278
Coppa Italia	27	11	9	7	34	28
Supercoppa Italiana	4	1	2	1	4	4
Champions League	1	0	1	0	0	0
Total official matches	247	94	82	71	341	310
Other meetings	64	21	12	31	101	124
Total matches	311	115	94	102	442	434

=== Top scorers ===
Below is the list of players with the most goals scored in official matches.

Rank	Player	Team(s) (goals)	Goals
1	(Brazil) (Italy) José Altafini	Milan (13); Juventus (1)	14
2	(Italy) Aldo Boffi	Milan	12
3	(Sweden) Gunnar Nordahl	Milan	11
4	(Italy) Gianni Rivera	Milan	10
5	(Belgium) Louis Van Hege	Milan	9
5	(Italy) Roberto Bettega	Juventus	9
5	(Italy) Giampiero Boniperti	Juventus	9
5	(Italy) Felice Borel	Juventus	9
5	(Italy) Alessandro Del Piero	Juventus	9
10	(Argentina) (Italy) Omar Sívori	Juventus	8
10	(Italy) Pietro Pastore	Milan (1); Juventus (7)	8
10	(Italy) Filippo Inzaghi	Milan (3); Juventus (5)	8
13	(Italy) Pietro Anastasi	Juventus	7

=== Most appearances ===
Below is the list of players with the most appearances in official games.

Rank	Player	Team(s) (apps)	Apps
1	(Italy) Paolo Maldini	Milan	45
2	(Italy) Franco Baresi	Milan	40
3	(Italy) Gianni Rivera	Milan	39
4	(Italy) Gianluigi Buffon	Juventus	34
5	(Italy) Alessandro Del Piero	Juventus	32
6	(Italy) Mauro Tassotti	Milan	31
6	(Italy) Alessandro Costacurta	Milan	31
8	(Italy) Giuseppe Furino	Juventus	29
8	(Italy) Sandro Salvadore	Milan (4); Juventus (25)	29
8	(Italy) Andrea Pirlo	Milan (19); Juventus (10)	29
8	(Italy) Leonardo Bonucci	Milan (2); Juventus (27)	29
12	(Italy) Giampiero Boniperti	Juventus	27
12	(Italy) Giorgio Chiellini	Juventus	27
12	(Italy) Mario Varglien	Juventus	27

=== Managers ===
==== Appearances ====
Rank	Manager	Team(s) (apps)	Apps
1	(Italy) Giovanni Trapattoni	Milan (2), Juventus (29)	31
2	(Italy) Massimiliano Allegri	Milan (10), Juventus (20)	30
3	(Italy) Nereo Rocco	Milan	23
3	(Italy) Carlo Ancelotti	Milan (18), Juventus (5)	23
5	(Italy) Marcello Lippi	Juventus	19
6	(Italy) Giuseppe Viani	Milan	18
6	(Italy) Antonio Busini	Milan	18
6	(Sweden) Nils Liedholm	Milan	18
6	(Italy) Fabio Capello	Milan (14), Juventus (4)	18
10	(Italy) Carlo Parola	Juventus	12
11	(Paraguay) Heriberto Herrera	Juventus	11
11	(Italy) Stefano Pioli	Milan	11
11	(Italy) Arrigo Sacchi	Milan	11

=== Records ===
- Largest victory: Milan 8–1 Juventus (1911–12)
- Most goals in a game: Juventus 8–2 Milan (1926–27)
- Biggest win for Juventus: Juventus 8–2 Milan (1926–27); Juventus 6–0 Milan (1925–26)
- Biggest win for Milan: Milan 8–1 Juventus (1911–12)
- Highest scoring draw: Juventus 3–3 Milan (1930–31); Milan 3–3 Juventus (1946–47)
- Biggest away win for Juventus: Milan 1–6 Juventus (1996–97)
- Biggest away win for Milan: Juventus 1–7 Milan (1949–50)

== Head-to-head ranking in Serie A (1930–2026) ==
P.	30	31	32	33	34	35	36	37	38	39	40	41	42	43	47	48	49	50	51	52	53	54	55	56	57	58	59	60	61	62	63	64	65	66	67	68	69	70	71	72	73	74	75	76	77	78	79	80	81	82	83	84	85	86	87	88	89	90	91	92	93	94	95	96	97	98	99	00	01	02	03	04	05	06	07	08	09	10	11	12	13	14	15	16	17	18	19	20	21	22	23	24	25	26
1		1	1	1	1	1												1	1	1			1		1	1	1	1	1	1					1	1				1	1		1		1	1	1		1	1		1		1		1				1	1	1	1	1	1	1	1			1	1	1	1						1	1	1	1	1	1	1	1	1	1		1				
2									2						2	2		2		2	2	2		2					2		2		2						2	2	2	2		2				2			2				2			2	2	2		2		2				2	2				2				2			2									2			2		
3	3								3		3	3		3			3		3		3	3						3			3	3				3	3	3						3			3										3											3			3	3		3		3	3	3			3											3		
4			4					4							4		4										4					4	4					4	4							4											4	4			4		4							4					4														4	4	4		4	
5							5	5				5																						5			5						5										5		5																					5											5							5
6													6	6																																						6	6			6													6																6	6		6						6
7																							7											7								7												7					7								7											7	7					7							7			
8							8			8	8																								8																																															8											8	
9					9					9														9	9	9																																																																				
10						10							10																																10																					10																	10											
11	11			11																																																													11																													
12		12																												12																																																																
13																																																																																														
14																																																		14																																												
15																																																15																																														
16																																																																																														
17																																																																																														
18																																																																																														
19																																																																																														
20																																																																										20																				

• Total: Milan with 34 higher finishes, Juventus with 56 higher finishes, and 1 equal finish (as of the end of the 2025–26 season). No head-to-heads in 1981 and 1983, since Milan was in Serie B, and in 2007, since Juventus was in Serie B.

Notes:

- 1945–46 Italian Football Championship is not included in Serie A statistics.
- Both teams finished with the same number of points in 1948, and the regulation of the time did not contemplate tiebreakers: both teams finished in second place.
- Both teams finished with the same number of points in 1985, and Milan finished ahead, on head-to-head points.
- Both teams finished with the same number of points in 2009, and Juventus finished ahead, on head-to-head points.
- Due to the Calciopoli scandal, Juventus' 2004–05 title was voided, while in the 2005–06 season Juventus was relegated and the title was awarded to Inter Milan as AC Milan suffered a 30-point deduction from its initial 2nd-place finish.

== Trophies ==
As of 6 January 2025

- Numbers with this background denote the competition record.

Juventus	Competition	Milan
Domestic
36	Serie A	19
15	Coppa Italia	5
9	Supercoppa Italiana	8
60	Domestic total	32
International
2	UEFA Champions League	7
1	UEFA Cup Winners' Cup (defunct)	2
3	UEFA Europa League	—
2	UEFA Super Cup	5
1	UEFA Intertoto Cup (defunct)	—
2	Intercontinental Cup (defunct)	3
—	FIFA Club World Cup	1
11	International total	18
71	Grand total	50

== See also ==
- Derby d'Italia
- Derby della Mole
- Derby della Madonnina
