= 2017–18 Serie A =

116th season of top-tier Italian football

Serie A
- Season: 2017–18
- Dates: 19 August 2017 – 20 May 2018
- Champions: Juventus; 34th title
- Relegated: Crotone; Hellas Verona; Benevento
- Champions League: Juventus; Napoli; Roma; Internazionale
- Europa League: Lazio; Milan; Atalanta
- Matches: 380
- Goals: 1,017 (2.68 per match)
- Top goalscorer: Mauro Icardi; Ciro Immobile (29 goals each)
- Biggest home win: Juventus 7–0 Sassuolo (4 February 2018)
- Biggest away win: Hellas Verona 0–5 Fiorentina (10 September 2017); Cagliari 0–5 Napoli (26 February 2018); Sampdoria 0–5 Internazionale (18 March 2018); Hellas Verona 0–5 Atalanta (18 March 2018)
- Highest scoring: Udinese 2–6 Juventus (22 October 2017); Lazio 6–2 Benevento (31 March 2018)
- Longest winning run: 12 games Juventus
- Longest unbeaten run: 18 games Juventus
- Longest winless run: 18 games Benevento
- Longest losing run: 14 games Benevento
- Highest attendance: 78,328; Internazionale 3–2 Milan (15 October 2017)
- Lowest attendance: 7,000; Chievo 2–3 Bologna (22 December 2017)
- Total attendance: 9,351,260
- Average attendance: 24,738

The 2017–18 Serie A (known as the Serie A TIM for sponsorship reasons) was the 116th season of top-tier Italian football, the 86th in a round-robin tournament and the 8th since its organization under a league committee separate from Serie B. Juventus were the six-time defending champions. The season ran from 19 August 2017 to 20 May 2018.

On 13 May, Juventus won a record seventh consecutive title and 34th title overall with one game remaining following their 0–0 draw with Roma.

The season was marred by the death of Davide Astori, the captain of Fiorentina, due to heart problems.

== Events ==
On 13 May 2017, SPAL were mathematically promoted from Serie B after 49 years away. Five days later, Hellas Verona clinched promoted as well, one year on from being relegated. On 8 June 2017, Benevento won the promotion play-offs to earn the club a first ever promotion to Serie A; they became the 67th team to participate in the Italian top flight.

After video assistant refereeing (VAR) was privately tested in the previous season, on 10 June 2017 it was announced replay assistance would be implemented for this season. The percentage of errors in Serie A in this season was reportedly 0.89 percent, compared to 5.78 percent if VAR had not been not used.

Subsequently to the new UEFA entry criteria, Italy obtained four group stage spots for the following Champions League season, as did the other three leagues with the highest coefficient in Europe; this was an improvement on the three Champions League spots (two group stage places and one qualifying play-off place) that Serie A had received prior.

On 4 March 2018, Davide Astori, captain of Fiorentina, died in his sleep while staying in a hotel in Udine prior to Fiorentina's match against Udinese, proven to be caused by cardiac arrest determined from an autopsy conducted two days later. All Serie A, Serie B and Serie C matches scheduled for 4 March were postponed. Cagliari and Fiorentina both retired the number 13 jersey worn by Astori in his honour.

The teams that were relegated included Benevento (on 22 April 2018, after one year in Serie A), Hellas Verona (on 5 May 2018, also after one year), and Crotone (on 20 May 2018, after two seasons in the top flight).

On 13 May 2018, Juventus won their seventh title in a row and the 34th in their history following their 0–0 draw away to Roma in the penultimate matchweek. Four days later, Juventus goalkeeper Gianluigi Buffon announced his farewell to Serie A (and the national football team). He left the league after 23 career seasons, the last seventeen being with Juventus, having earned nine league titles and 640 caps, the second highest ever in Serie A. However, after a year away with Paris Saint-Germain, Buffon would return to Juventus and to Serie A for the 2019–20 season.

== Teams ==
=== Stadiums and locations ===
Locations of the 2017–18 Serie A teams

Team	Home city	Stadium	Capacity	2016–17 season
Atalanta	Bergamo	Stadio Atleti Azzurri d'Italia	21,300	4th in Serie A
Benevento	Benevento	Stadio Ciro Vigorito	17,554	Serie B play-off winners
Bologna	Bologna	Stadio Renato Dall'Ara	38,279	15th in Serie A
Cagliari	Cagliari	Sardegna Arena	16,233	11th in Serie A
Chievo	Verona	Stadio Marc'Antonio Bentegodi	38,402	14th in Serie A
Crotone	Crotone	Stadio Ezio Scida	16,547	17th in Serie A
Fiorentina	Florence	Stadio Artemio Franchi	43,147	8th in Serie A
Genoa	Genoa	Stadio Luigi Ferraris	36,685	16th in Serie A
Hellas Verona	Verona	Stadio Marc'Antonio Bentegodi	38,402	Serie B runners-up
Internazionale	Milan	San Siro	80,018	7th in Serie A
Juventus	Turin	Allianz Stadium	41,507	Serie A champions
Lazio	Rome	Stadio Olimpico	70,634	5th in Serie A
Milan	Milan	San Siro	80,018	6th in Serie A
Napoli	Naples	Stadio San Paolo	60,240	3rd in Serie A
Roma	Rome	Stadio Olimpico	70,634	2nd in Serie A
Sampdoria	Genoa	Stadio Luigi Ferraris	36,685	10th in Serie A
Sassuolo	Sassuolo	Mapei Stadium – Città del Tricolore (Reggio Emilia)	23,717	12th in Serie A
SPAL	Ferrara	Stadio Paolo Mazza	13,020	Serie B champions
Torino	Turin	Stadio Olimpico Grande Torino	27,994	9th in Serie A
Udinese	Udine	Dacia Arena	25,144	13th in Serie A

=== Personnel and kits ===
Team	Head coach	Captain	Kit manufacturer	Shirt sponsor(s)	
Team	Head coach	Captain	Kit manufacturer	Main	Other
Atalanta	(Italy) Gian Piero Gasperini	(Argentina) Alejandro Gómez	Joma	Veratour/Radici Group (in UEFA matches)	Front: Modus FM; Back: Elettrocanali
Benevento	(Italy) Roberto De Zerbi	(Italy) Fabio Lucioni	Frankie Garage	La Molisana	Front: SAPA Group; Back: Rillo Costruzioni
Bologna	(Italy) Roberto Donadoni	(Italy) Daniele Gastaldello	Macron	FAAC	Back: Illumia
Cagliari	(Uruguay) Diego López	(Italy) Daniele Dessena	Macron	ISOLA Artigianato di Sardegna	Front: Ichnusa; Back: Nieddittas
Chievo	(Italy) Lorenzo D'Anna	(Italy) Sergio Pellissier	Givova	Paluani/Nobis Assicurazioni/Pescherie Viviani/CF Costruzioni/Cubi Impianti Tecnologici/Alcott/Avelia/KickOffers/Conte di Campiano/Nico Abbigliamento e Calzature/Midac Batteries/2018 World Cadets and Juniors Fencing Championships/Givova/Acqua Sangemini/Vicentini Carni	Front: Salumi Coati; Back: Nobis Assicurazioni/Filo diretto Assicurazioni
Crotone	(Italy) Walter Zenga	(Italy) Alex Cordaz	Zeus Sport	Lewer	Front: Abramo Customer Care; Back: Metal Carpinteria
Fiorentina	(Italy) Stefano Pioli	(Croatia) Milan Badelj	Le Coq Sportif	Folletto/Vorwerk (in UEFA matches)	Back: Save the Children
Genoa	(Italy) Davide Ballardini	(Italy) Mattia Perin	Lotto	Eviva Energia	Front: Zentiva; Back: LeasePlan
Hellas Verona	(Italy) Fabio Pecchia	(Italy) Rômulo	Nike	Metano Nord	Front: SEC Events (H)/Maticmind (A)/Sartori Vini (T); Back: Chancebet
Internazionale	(Italy) Luciano Spalletti	(Argentina) Mauro Icardi	Nike	Pirelli	Back: Driver
Juventus	(Italy) Massimiliano Allegri	(Italy) Gianluigi Buffon	Adidas	Jeep	Back: Cygames
Lazio	(Italy) Simone Inzaghi	(Bosnia and Herzegovina) Senad Lulić	Macron	Sèleco	Front: Clinica Paideia; Back: Sèleco Easy Life
Milan	(Italy) Gennaro Gattuso	(Italy) Leonardo Bonucci	Adidas	Fly Emirates	None
Napoli	(Italy) Maurizio Sarri	(Slovakia) Marek Hamšík	Kappa	Lete	Front: Pasta Garofalo; Back: Kimbo Caffè
Roma	(Italy) Eusebio Di Francesco	(Italy) Daniele De Rossi	Nike	Qatar Airways	None
Sampdoria	(Italy) Marco Giampaolo	(Italy) Vasco Regini	Joma	Invent Energy	IBSA Group
Sassuolo	(Italy) Giuseppe Iachini	(Italy) Francesco Magnanelli	Kappa	Mapei	None
SPAL	(Italy) Leonardo Semplici	(Italy) Mirco Antenucci	Macron	Interspar/Tassi Group	Back: BMW ErreEffe Group
Torino	(Italy) Walter Mazzarri	(Italy) Andrea Belotti	Kappa	Suzuki/Suzuki Swift	Front: Fratelli Beretta; Back: SportPesa
Udinese	(Croatia) Igor Tudor	(Brazil) Danilo	HS Sport	Dacia	Front: Vortice; Back: Magnadyne/Bluenergy

=== Managerial changes ===
Team	Outgoing manager	Manner of departure	Date of vacancy	Position in table	Replaced by	Date of appointment
Internazionale	(Italy) Stefano Vecchi	End of caretaker spell	28 May 2017	Pre-season	(Italy) Luciano Spalletti	9 June 2017
Roma	(Italy) Luciano Spalletti	Mutual consent	30 May 2017	Pre-season	(Italy) Eusebio Di Francesco	13 June 2017
Fiorentina	(Portugal) Paulo Sousa	End of contract	6 June 2017	Pre-season	(Italy) Stefano Pioli	6 June 2017
Sassuolo	(Italy) Eusebio Di Francesco	Signed by Roma	13 June 2017	Pre-season	(Italy) Cristian Bucchi	20 June 2017
Cagliari	(Italy) Massimo Rastelli	Sacked	17 October 2017	14th	(Uruguay) Diego López	18 October 2017
Benevento	(Italy) Marco Baroni	Sacked	23 October 2017	20th	(Italy) Roberto De Zerbi	23 October 2017
Genoa	(Croatia) Ivan Jurić	Sacked	5 November 2017	18th	(Italy) Davide Ballardini	6 November 2017
Udinese	(Italy) Luigi Delneri	Sacked	21 November 2017	14th	(Italy) Massimo Oddo	21 November 2017
Sassuolo	(Italy) Cristian Bucchi	Sacked	27 November 2017	16th	(Italy) Giuseppe Iachini	27 November 2017
Milan	(Italy) Vincenzo Montella	Sacked	27 November 2017	7th	(Italy) Gennaro Gattuso	27 November 2017
Crotone	(Italy) Davide Nicola	Resigned	6 December 2017	16th	(Italy) Walter Zenga	8 December 2017
Torino	(Serbia) Siniša Mihajlović	Sacked	4 January 2018	10th	(Italy) Walter Mazzarri	4 January 2018
Udinese	(Italy) Massimo Oddo	Sacked	24 April 2018	15th	(Croatia) Igor Tudor	24 April 2018
Chievo	(Italy) Rolando Maran	Sacked	29 April 2018	17th	(Italy) Lorenzo D'Anna	29 April 2018

== League table ==
Pos	Team	Pld	W	D	L	GF	GA	GD	Pts	Qualification or relegation
1	Juventus (C)	38	30	5	3	86	24	+62	95	Qualification to Champions League group stage
2	Napoli	38	28	7	3	77	29	+48	91	Qualification to Champions League group stage
3	Roma	38	23	8	7	61	28	+33	77	Qualification to Champions League group stage
4	Internazionale	38	20	12	6	66	30	+36	72	Qualification to Champions League group stage
5	Lazio	38	21	9	8	89	49	+40	72 (Note: Internazionale finished ahead of Lazio on head-to-head: Internazionale 0–0 Lazio, Lazio 2–3 Internazionale)	Qualification to Europa League group stage (Note: Since the winners of the 2017–18 Coppa Italia, Juventus, qualified for European competition based on league position, the spot awarded to the cup winners (Europa League group stage) was passed to the sixth-placed team and the spot awarded to the sixth-placed team (Europa League second qualifying round) was passed to the seventh-placed team.)
6	Milan (Note: Milan was originally banned from European competition due to violations against Financial Fair Play regulations. They appealed to the Court of Arbitration for Sport, and the ban was overturned on 20 July 2018.)	38	18	10	10	56	42	+14	64	Qualification to Europa League group stage
7	Atalanta	38	16	12	10	57	39	+18	60	Qualification to Europa League second qualifying round
8	Fiorentina	38	16	9	13	54	46	+8	57	
9	Torino	38	13	15	10	54	46	+8	54	
10	Sampdoria	38	16	6	16	56	60	−4	54	
11	Sassuolo	38	11	10	17	29	59	−30	43	
12	Genoa	38	11	8	19	33	43	−10	41	
13	Chievo	38	10	10	18	36	59	−23	40 (Note: Chievo finished ahead of Udinese on head-to-head points: Chievo 1–1 Udinese, Udinese 1–2 Chievo.)	
14	Udinese	38	12	4	22	48	63	−15	40	
15	Bologna	38	11	6	21	40	52	−12	39	
16	Cagliari	38	11	6	21	33	61	−28	39	
17	SPAL	38	8	14	16	39	59	−20	38	
18	Crotone (R)	38	9	8	21	40	66	−26	35	Relegation to Serie B
19	Hellas Verona (R)	38	7	4	27	30	78	−48	25	Relegation to Serie B
20	Benevento (R)	38	6	3	29	33	84	−51	21	Relegation to Serie B

Source: Serie A, Soccerway
Rules for classification: 1) Points; 2) Head-to-head points; 3) Head-to-head goal difference; 4) Goal difference; 5) Goals scored; 6) Draw.
(C) Champions; (R) Relegated

== Results ==
Home \ Away	ATA	BEN	BOL	CAG	CHV	CRO	FIO	GEN	HEL	INT	JUV	LAZ	MIL	NAP	ROM	SAM	SAS	SPA	TOR	UDI
Atalanta	—	1–0	1–0	1–2	1–0	5–1	1–1	3–1	3–0	0–0	2–2	3–3	1–1	0–1	0–1	1–2	2–1	1–1	2–1	2–0
Benevento	0–3	—	0–1	1–2	1–0	3–2	0–3	1–0	3–0	1–2	2–4	1–5	2–2	0–2	0–4	3–2	1–2	1–2	0–1	3–3
Bologna	0–1	3–0	—	1–1	1–2	2–3	1–2	2–0	2–0	1–1	0–3	1–2	1–2	0–3	1–1	3–0	2–1	2–1	1–1	1–2
Cagliari	1–0	2–1	0–0	—	0–2	1–0	0–1	2–3	2–1	1–3	0–1	2–2	1–2	0–5	0–1	2–2	0–1	2–0	0–4	2–1
Chievo	1–1	1–0	2–3	2–1	—	2–1	2–1	0–1	3–2	1–2	0–2	1–2	1–4	0–0	0–0	2–1	1–1	2–1	0–0	1–1
Crotone	1–1	2–0	1–0	1–1	1–0	—	2–1	0–1	0–0	0–2	1–1	2–2	0–3	0–1	0–2	4–1	4–1	2–3	2–2	0–3
Fiorentina	1–1	1–0	2–1	0–1	1–0	2–0	—	0–0	1–4	1–1	0–2	3–4	1–1	3–0	2–4	1–2	3–0	0–0	3–0	2–1
Genoa	1–2	1–0	0–1	2–1	1–1	1–0	2–3	—	3–1	2–0	2–4	2–3	0–1	2–3	1–1	0–2	1–0	1–1	1–2	0–1
Hellas Verona	0–5	1–0	2–3	1–0	1–0	0–3	0–5	0–1	—	1–2	1–3	0–3	3–0	1–3	0–1	0–0	0–1	1–3	2–1	0–1
Internazionale	2–0	2–0	2–1	4–0	5–0	1–1	3–0	1–0	3–0	—	2–3	0–0	3–2	0–0	1–1	3–2	1–2	2–0	1–1	1–3
Juventus	2–0	2–1	3–1	3–0	3–0	3–0	1–0	1–0	2–1	0–0	—	1–2	3–1	0–1	1–0	3–0	7–0	4–1	4–0	2–0
Lazio	1–1	6–2	1–1	3–0	5–1	4–0	1–1	1–2	2–0	2–3	0–1	—	4–1	1–4	0–0	4–0	6–1	0–0	1–3	3–0
Milan	0–2	0–1	2–1	2–1	3–2	1–0	5–1	0–0	4–1	0–0	0–2	2–1	—	0–0	0–2	1–0	1–1	2–0	0–0	2–1
Napoli	3–1	6–0	3–1	3–0	2–1	2–1	0–0	1–0	2–0	0–0	0–1	4–1	2–1	—	2–4	3–2	3–1	1–0	2–2	4–2
Roma	1–2	5–2	1–0	1–0	4–1	1–0	0–2	2–1	3–0	1–3	0–0	2–1	0–2	0–1	—	0–1	1–1	3–1	3–0	3–1
Sampdoria	3–1	2–1	1–0	4–1	4–1	5–0	3–1	0–0	2–0	0–5	3–2	1–2	2–0	0–2	1–1	—	0–1	2–0	1–1	2–1
Sassuolo	0–3	2–2	0–1	0–0	0–0	2–1	1–0	0–0	0–2	1–0	1–3	0–3	0–2	1–1	0–1	1–0	—	1–1	1–1	0–1
SPAL	1–1	2–0	1–0	0–2	0–0	1–1	1–1	1–0	2–2	1–1	0–0	2–5	0–4	2–3	0–3	3–1	0–1	—	2–2	3–2
Torino	1–1	3–0	3–0	2–1	1–1	4–1	1–2	0–0	2–2	1–0	0–1	0–1	1–1	1–3	0–1	2–2	3–0	2–1	—	2–0
Udinese	2–1	2–0	1–0	0–1	1–2	1–2	0–2	1–0	4–0	0–4	2–6	1–2	1–1	0–1	0–2	4–0	1–2	1–1	2–3	—

Source: Serie A
Legend: Blue = home team win; Yellow = draw; Red = away team win.

== Season statistics ==
=== Top goalscorers ===
Rank	Player	Club	Goals
1	(Argentina) Mauro Icardi	Internazionale	29
1	(Italy) Ciro Immobile	Lazio	29
3	(Argentina) Paulo Dybala	Juventus	22
4	(Italy) Fabio Quagliarella	Sampdoria	19
5	(Belgium) Dries Mertens	Napoli	18
6	(Bosnia and Herzegovina) Edin Džeko	Roma	16
6	(Argentina) Gonzalo Higuaín	Juventus	16
8	(Argentina) Giovanni Simeone	Fiorentina	14
9	(Spain) Iago Falque	Torino	12
9	(Italy) Roberto Inglese	Chievo	12
9	(Italy) Kevin Lasagna	Udinese	12
9	(Serbia) Sergej Milinković-Savić	Lazio	12

=== Hat-tricks ===
Player	Club	Against	Result	Date
(Argentina) Paulo Dybala	Juventus	Genoa	4–2 (A) Archived 6 June 2018 at the Wayback Machine	26 August 2017
(Italy) Ciro Immobile	Lazio	Milan	4–1 (H) Archived 25 June 2018 at the Wayback Machine	10 September 2017
(Argentina) Paulo Dybala	Juventus	Sassuolo	3–1 (A) Archived 26 June 2018 at the Wayback Machine	17 September 2017
(Belgium) Dries Mertens	Napoli	Benevento	6–0 (H) Archived 26 June 2018 at the Wayback Machine	17 September 2017
(Argentina) Mauro Icardi	Internazionale	Milan	3–2 (H) Archived 26 June 2018 at the Wayback Machine	15 October 2017
(Germany) Sami Khedira	Juventus	Udinese	6–2 (A) Archived 6 June 2018 at the Wayback Machine	22 October 2017
(Croatia) Ivan Perišić	Internazionale	Chievo	5–0 (H) Archived 11 April 2018 at the Wayback Machine	3 December 2017
(Italy) Ciro Immobile^{4}	Lazio	SPAL	5–2 (A) Archived 15 June 2018 at the Wayback Machine	6 January 2018
(Italy) Fabio Quagliarella	Sampdoria	Fiorentina	3–1 (H) Archived 26 February 2018 at the Wayback Machine	21 January 2018
(Argentina) Gonzalo Higuaín	Juventus	Sassuolo	7–0 (H) Archived 11 June 2018 at the Wayback Machine	4 February 2018
(Argentina) Mauro Icardi^{4}	Internazionale	Sampdoria	5–0 (A) Archived 26 June 2018 at the Wayback Machine	18 March 2018
(Slovenia) Josip Iličić	Atalanta	Hellas Verona	5–0 (A) Archived 26 June 2018 at the Wayback Machine	18 March 2018
(Italy) Andrea Belotti	Torino	Crotone	4–1 (H) Archived 10 June 2018 at the Wayback Machine	4 April 2018
(Argentina) Paulo Dybala	Juventus	Benevento	4–2 (A) Archived 17 June 2018 at the Wayback Machine	7 April 2018
(France) Jordan Veretout	Fiorentina	Lazio	3–4 (H) Archived 26 June 2018 at the Wayback Machine	18 April 2018
(Argentina) Giovanni Simeone	Fiorentina	Napoli	3–0 (H) Archived 6 June 2018 at the Wayback Machine	29 April 2018

Note

^{4} Player scored four goals; (H) – Home (A) – Away

=== Clean sheets ===
Rank	Player	Club	Clean sheets
1	(Spain) Pepe Reina	Napoli	18
2	(Brazil) Alisson	Roma	17
2	(Slovenia) Samir Handanović	Internazionale	17
4	(Italy) Marco Sportiello	Fiorentina	14
5	(Italy) Gianluigi Donnarumma	Milan	12
5	(Italy) Mattia Perin	Genoa	12
5	(Italy) Gianluigi Buffon	Juventus	12
7	(Albania) Thomas Strakosha	Lazio	11
7	(Poland) Wojciech Szczęsny	Juventus	11
10	(Italy) Salvatore Sirigu	Torino	10
10	(Italy) Andrea Consigli	Sassuolo	10

== Awards ==
=== Annual awards ===
Award	Winner	Club
Most Valuable Player	(Argentina) Mauro Icardi	Inter Milan
Coach of the Year	(Italy) Massimiliano Allegri	Juventus
Best Goalkeeper	(Brazil) Alisson	Roma

Serie A Team of the Year
Goalkeeper	(Brazil) Alisson (Roma)			
Defenders	(Portugal) João Cancelo (Inter Milan)	(Italy) Giorgio Chiellini (Juventus)	(Senegal) Kalidou Koulibaly (Napoli)	(Brazil) Alex Sandro (Juventus)
Midfielders	(Belgium) Radja Nainggolan (Roma)		(Bosnia and Herzegovina) Miralem Pjanić (Juventus)	(Serbia) Sergej Milinković-Savić (Lazio)
Forwards	(Argentina) Paulo Dybala (Juventus)		(Argentina) Mauro Icardi (Inter Milan)	(Italy) Ciro Immobile (Lazio)

== Attendances ==
Team	Avg. home att.
Internazionale	57,529
Milan	52,690
Napoli	43,050
Juventus	39,316
Roma	37,450
Lazio	30,990
Fiorentina	26,092
Genoa	20,941
Bologna	20,903
Sampdoria	20,156
Torino	18,596
Atalanta	17,921
Udinese	17,906
Hellas Verona	17,333
Cagliari	14,685
Chievo	12,540
Benevento	12,132
SPAL	12,067
Sassuolo	11,237
Crotone	10,581
