= 1990 Coppa Italia final =

42nd Coppa Italia final
- Event: 1989–90 Coppa Italia
Juventus	Milan
1	0

First leg
Juventus	Milan
0	0
- Date: 28 February 1990
- Venue: Stadio Comunale, Turin
- Referee: Pietro D'Elia
- Attendance: 30,105

Second leg
Milan	Juventus
0	1
- Date: 25 April 1990
- Venue: San Siro, Milan
- Referee: Pietro D'Elia
- Attendance: 83,928

The 1990 Coppa Italia final decided the winner of the 1989–90 Coppa Italia. It was held on 28 February and 25 April 1990 between Juventus and Milan. The first leg at the Stadio Comunale in Turin ended in a goalless draw while the second leg at the San Siro in Milan was followed two months later and ended in favour of Juventus, after the only goal scored by Roberto Galia.

== First leg ==
28 February 1990
20:30 CET

Juventus	0–0	Milan
	Report

Stadio Comunale, Turin
Attendance: 30,105
Referee: Pietro D'Elia

Juventus	Milan

Juventus:
GK	1	(Italy) Stefano Tacconi (c)
RB	2	(Italy) Roberto Galia
CB	5	(Italy) Dario Bonetti
CB	6	(Italy) Roberto Tricella	(substituted off) 79'
LB	3	(Italy) Luigi De Agostini
RM	7	(Soviet Union) Sergei Aleinikov
CM	8	(Portugal) Rui Barros
CM	10	(Italy) Giancarlo Marocchi
LM	4	(Italy) Angelo Alessio
CF	9	(Italy) Pierluigi Casiraghi
CF	11	(Italy) Salvatore Schillaci
Substitutes:
DF		(Italy) Sergio Brio	(substituted in) 79'
Manager:
(Italy) Dino Zoff

Milan:
GK	1	(Italy) Giovanni Galli
RB	2	(Italy) Mauro Tassotti
CB	5	(Italy) Filippo Galli	(yellow card) 55'
CB	6	(Italy) Franco Baresi (c)
LB	3	(Italy) Paolo Maldini
RM	4	(Italy) Diego Fuser		(substituted off) 76'
CM	8	(Netherlands) Frank Rijkaard	(red card) 68'
CM	10	(Italy) Carlo Ancelotti	(yellow card) 15'
LM	11	(Italy) Alberigo Evani		(substituted off) 88'
CF	7	(Italy) Daniele Massaro
CF	9	(Netherlands) Marco van Basten
Substitutes:
MF		(Italy) Giovanni Stroppa		(substituted in) 76'
MF		(Italy) Stefano Salvatori		(substituted in) 88'
Manager:
(Italy) Arrigo Sacchi

== Second leg ==
25 April 1990
16:00 CEST

Milan	0–1	Juventus
	Report	Galia 16'

San Siro, Milan
Attendance: 83,928
Referee: Pietro D'Elia

Milan	Juventus

Milan:
GK	1	(Italy) Giovanni Galli
RB	2	(Italy) Mauro Tassotti
CB	5	(Italy) Filippo Galli
CB	6	(Italy) Franco Baresi (c)	(yellow card) 50'
LB	3	(Italy) Alessandro Costacurta
RM	7	(Italy) Roberto Donadoni
CM	4	(Italy) Angelo Colombo		(substituted off) 66'
CM	8	(Netherlands) Frank Rijkaard
LM	10	(Italy) Alberigo Evani
CF	9	(Netherlands) Marco van Basten
CF	11	(Italy) Daniele Massaro		(substituted off) 46'
Substitutes:
MF		(Italy) Stefano Salvatori		(substituted in) 66'
FW		(Italy) Stefano Borgonovo		(substituted in) 46'
Manager:
(Italy) Arrigo Sacchi

Juventus:
GK	1	(Italy) Stefano Tacconi (c)
RB	2	(Italy) Nicolò Napoli
CB	5	(Italy) Pasquale Bruno
CB	6	(Italy) Dario Bonetti
LB	3	(Italy) Luigi De Agostini
RM	7	(Soviet Union) Sergei Aleinikov
CM	8	(Portugal) Rui Barros
CM	10	(Italy) Giancarlo Marocchi	(yellow card) 62'
LM	4	(Italy) Roberto Galia
CF	9	(Italy) Pierluigi Casiraghi
CF	11	(Italy) Salvatore Schillaci		(substituted off) 75'
Substitutes:
MF		(Italy) Angelo Alessio		(substituted in) 75'
Manager:
(Italy) Dino Zoff

== See also ==
- 1989–90 AC Milan season
- 1989–90 Juventus FC season
- Juventus FC–AC Milan rivalry

Played between same clubs:

- 1942 Coppa Italia final
- 1973 Coppa Italia final
- 2016 Coppa Italia final
- 2018 Coppa Italia final
