= 2016 Coppa Italia final =

68th Coppa Italia final
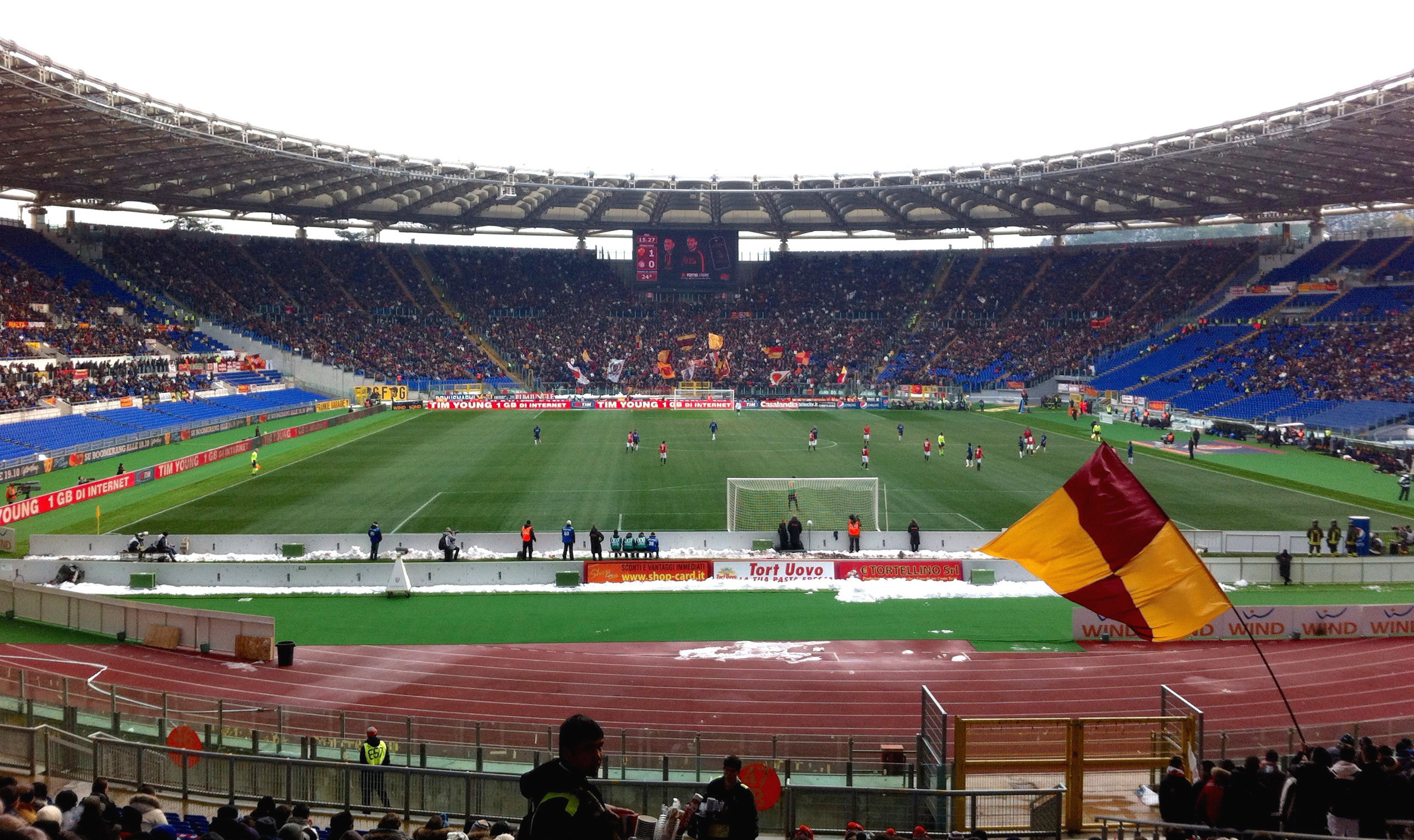
- The Stadio Olimpico in Rome held the final
- Event: 2015–16 Coppa Italia
Milan	Juventus
0	1
- After extra time
- Date: 21 May 2016
- Venue: Stadio Olimpico, Rome
- Referee: Gianluca Rocchi
- Attendance: 72,698
- Weather: Clear; 17 °C (63 °F); 59% humidity

The 2016 Coppa Italia final decided the winner of the 2015–16 Coppa Italia, Italy's main football cup. It was played on 21 May 2016 at the Stadio Olimpico in Rome, between rivals Milan and Juventus.

Since Juventus won the 2015–16 Serie A, Milan secured its place in the 2016 Supercoppa Italiana. Juventus won the match 1–0 after extra time, with a 110th-minute goal by the substitute Álvaro Morata with his first touch, successfully defending their title.

== Background ==
Milan played in a final for the 13th time, of which they have won five. Their most recent final was in 2003, defeating Roma 6–3 on aggregate. It was Juventus' second consecutive final and the 16th in their history, second only to Roma's 17. They had won a record ten titles. They were the title holders when they defeated Lazio 2–1 after extra time in the last year's final.

Milan and Juventus contested in three finals. Juventus won twice, the first was in 1942 after the final ended with a 1–1 draw, they won 4–1 in replay, the second was in 1990 with a 1–0 victory on aggregate. Milan won 6–3 on penalties after a 1–1 draw in 1973.

== Road to the final ==
Note: In all results below, the score of the finalist is given first (H: home; A: away).

Milan		Round	Juventus
Opponent	Result	2015–16 Coppa Italia	Opponent	Result
Perugia	2–0 (H)	Third round	N/A	N/A
Crotone	3–1 (a.e.t) (H)	Fourth round	N/A	N/A
Sampdoria	2–0 (A)	Round of 16	Torino	4–0 (H)
Carpi	2–1 (H)	Quarter-finals	Lazio	1–0 (A)
Alessandria	1–0 (A), 5–0 (H) (6–0 agg.)	Semi-finals	Internazionale	3–0 (H), 0–3 (A) (3–3 agg. 5–3 p)

== Match ==
=== Team selection ===
Juventus were without defender Leonardo Bonucci, who was given a yellow card in both legs of the semi-final. They also missed Claudio Marchisio who suffered a torn cruciate ligament in his left knee, that sidelined him for nearly six months.

=== Details ===
21 May 2016
20:45 CEST (UTC+2)

Milan	0–1 (a.e.t.)	Juventus
	Report	Morata 110'

Stadio Olimpico, Rome
Attendance: 72,698
Referee: Gianluca Rocchi

Milan	Juventus

GK	99	(Italy) Gianluigi Donnarumma
RB	96	(Italy) Davide Calabria
CB	17	(Colombia) Cristián Zapata	(yellow card) 50'
CB	13	(Italy) Alessio Romagnoli
LB	2	(Italy) Mattia De Sciglio
DM	18	(Italy) Riccardo Montolivo (c)		(substituted off) 108'
CM	27	(Slovakia) Juraj Kucka		(substituted off) 112'
CM	16	(Italy) Andrea Poli		(substituted off) 84'
RW	10	(Japan) Keisuke Honda	(yellow card) 88'
CF	70	(Colombia) Carlos Bacca
LW	28	(Italy) Giacomo Bonaventura
Substitutes:
GK	1	(Spain) Diego López
DF	4	(Italy) José Mauri	(yellow card) 119'	(substituted on) 108'
DF	5	(France) Philippe Mexès
FW	7	(France) Jérémy Ménez
FW	9	(Brazil) Luiz Adriano
FW	19	(France) M'Baye Niang	(yellow card) 101'	(substituted on) 84'
GK	32	(Italy) Christian Abbiati
DF	33	(Brazil) Alex
FW	45	(Italy) Mario Balotelli		(substituted on) 112'
MF	72	(Ghana) Kevin-Prince Boateng
MF	73	(Italy) Manuel Locatelli
MF	91	(Italy) Andrea Bertolacci
Manager:
(Italy) Cristian Brocchi

GK	25	(Brazil) Neto
CB	24	(Italy) Daniele Rugani	(yellow card) 120+2'
CB	15	(Italy) Andrea Barzagli	(yellow card) 105'
CB	3	(Italy) Giorgio Chiellini (c)	(yellow card) 117'
RWB	26	(Switzerland) Stephan Lichtsteiner		(substituted off) 75'
CM	18	(Gabon) Mario Lemina
CM	11	(Brazil) Hernanes		(substituted off) 108'
CM	10	(France) Paul Pogba	(yellow card) 62'
LWB	33	(France) Patrice Evra		(substituted off) 62'
CF	21	(Argentina) Paulo Dybala
CF	17	(Croatia) Mario Mandžukić
Substitutes:
GK	1	(Italy) Gianluigi Buffon
FW	7	(Italy) Simone Zaza
FW	9	(Spain) Álvaro Morata	(yellow card) 119'	(substituted on) 108'
DF	12	(Brazil) Alex Sandro		(substituted on) 62'
FW	16	(Colombia) Juan Cuadrado		(substituted on) 75'
MF	20	(Italy) Simone Padoin
MF	22	(Ghana) Kwadwo Asamoah
MF	27	(Italy) Stefano Sturaro
GK	34	(Brazil) Rubinho
MF	37	(Argentina) Roberto Pereyra
Manager:
(Italy) Massimiliano Allegri

Match rules

- 90 minutes.
- 30 minutes of extra time if necessary.
- Penalty shoot-out if scores still level.

== See also ==
- 2015–16 AC Milan season
- 2015–16 Juventus FC season
- 2018 Coppa Italia final - played between same teams
