= 2018 Coppa Italia final =

70th Coppa Italia final
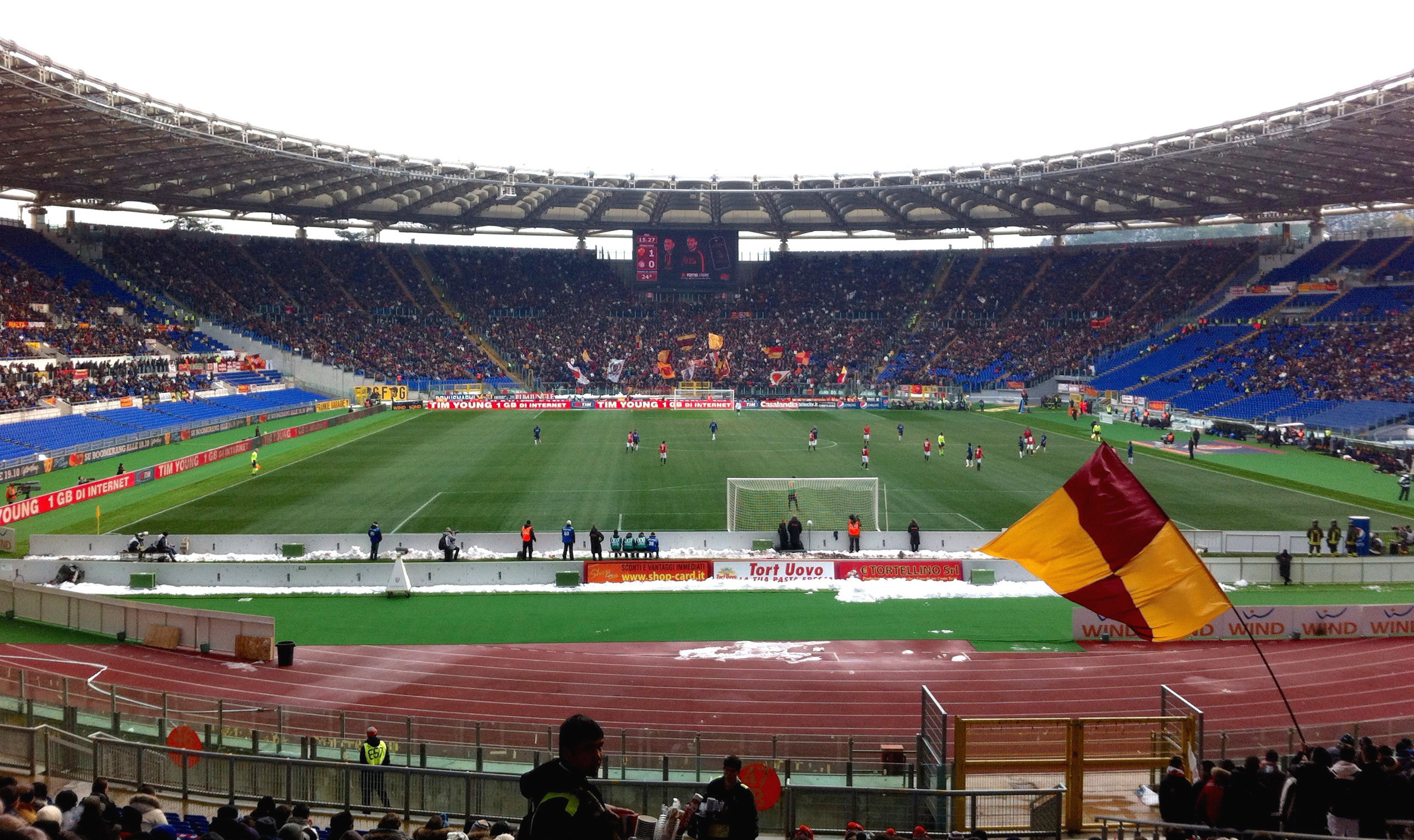
- The Stadio Olimpico in Rome held the final
- Event: 2017–18 Coppa Italia
Juventus	Milan
4	0
- Date: 9 May 2018
- Venue: Stadio Olimpico, Rome
- Referee: Antonio Damato
- Attendance: 64,983

The 2018 Coppa Italia final decided the winner of the 2017–18 Coppa Italia, Italy's main football cup. It was played on 9 May 2018 at the Stadio Olimpico in Rome between rivals Juventus and Milan.

Juventus won the match 4–0 with all four goals coming in the second half, winning their fourth consecutive Coppa Italia title and 13th title overall. This was the fifth time these teams met in the Coppa Italia Final, with Juventus winning previously in 1942, 1990 and 2016, and Milan winning in the 1973 final.

== Road to the final ==
Note: In all results below, the score of the finalist is given first (H: home; A: away).

Juventus		Round	Milan
Opponent	Result	2017–18 Coppa Italia	Opponent	Result
Genoa	2–0 (H)	Round of 16	Hellas Verona	3–0 (H)
Torino	2–0 (H)	Quarter-finals	Internazionale	1–0 (a.e.t.) (H)
Atalanta	1–0 (H), 1–0 (A) (2–0 agg.)	Semi-finals	Lazio	0–0 (H), 0–0 (a.e.t.) (A) (0–0 agg., 5–4 p)

== Match ==
=== Details ===
9 May 2018
21:00 CEST (UTC+2)

Juventus	4–0	Milan
Benatia 56', 64'; Douglas Costa 61'; Kalinić 76' (o.g.)	Report

Stadio Olimpico, Rome
Attendance: 64,983
Referee: Antonio Damato

Juventus	Milan

GK	1	(Italy) Gianluigi Buffon (c)
RB	7	(Colombia) Juan Cuadrado
CB	15	(Italy) Andrea Barzagli
CB	4	(Morocco) Medhi Benatia
LB	22	(Ghana) Kwadwo Asamoah
CM	6	(Germany) Sami Khedira
CM	5	(Bosnia and Herzegovina) Miralem Pjanić		(substituted off) 87'
CM	14	(France) Blaise Matuidi
RW	10	(Argentina) Paulo Dybala		(substituted off) 83'
LW	11	(Brazil) Douglas Costa	(yellow card) 62'	(substituted off) 73'
CF	17	(Croatia) Mario Mandžukić
Substitutes:
GK	16	(Italy) Carlo Pinsoglio
GK	23	(Poland) Wojciech Szczęsny
DF	2	(Italy) Mattia De Sciglio
DF	12	(Brazil) Alex Sandro
DF	21	(Germany) Benedikt Höwedes
DF	24	(Italy) Daniele Rugani
DF	26	(Switzerland) Stephan Lichtsteiner
MF	8	(Italy) Claudio Marchisio		(substituted in) 87'
MF	27	(Italy) Stefano Sturaro
MF	30	(Uruguay) Rodrigo Bentancur
FW	9	(Argentina) Gonzalo Higuaín		(substituted in) 83'
FW	33	(Italy) Federico Bernardeschi		(substituted in) 73'
Manager:
(Italy) Massimiliano Allegri

GK	99	(Italy) Gianluigi Donnarumma
RB	2	(Italy) Davide Calabria	(yellow card) 73'
CB	19	(Italy) Leonardo Bonucci (c)
CB	13	(Italy) Alessio Romagnoli
LB	68	(Switzerland) Ricardo Rodríguez
CM	79	(Ivory Coast) Franck Kessié
CM	73	(Italy) Manuel Locatelli		(substituted off) 80'
CM	5	(Italy) Giacomo Bonaventura
RW	8	(Spain) Suso		(substituted off) 67'
CF	63	(Italy) Patrick Cutrone		(substituted off) 62'
LW	10	(Turkey) Hakan Çalhanoğlu
Substitutes:
GK	30	(Italy) Marco Storari
GK	90	(Italy) Antonio Donnarumma
DF	17	(Colombia) Cristián Zapata
DF	20	(Italy) Ignazio Abate
DF	22	(Argentina) Mateo Musacchio
DF	31	(Italy) Luca Antonelli
MF	4	(Italy) José Mauri
MF	18	(Italy) Riccardo Montolivo		(substituted in) 80'
MF	21	(Argentina) Lucas Biglia
FW	7	(Croatia) Nikola Kalinić		(substituted in) 62'
FW	9	(Portugal) André Silva
FW	11	(Italy) Fabio Borini		(substituted in) 67'
Manager:
(Italy) Gennaro Gattuso

Assistant referees:
Riccardo Di Fiore
Giulio Dobosz
Fourth official:
Marco Guida
Reserve assistant referee:
Fabrizio Posado
Video assistant referee:
Massimiliano Irrati
Assistant video assistant referee:
Gianluca Vuoto

Match rules

- 90 minutes.
- 30 minutes of extra time if necessary.
- Penalty shoot-out if scores still level.
- Twelve named substitutes, of which up to three may be used.

== See also ==
- 2017–18 AC Milan season
- 2017–18 Juventus FC season
