= La Molisana =

Italian food company

- Company type: Public
- Industry: Food
- Founded: 1912; 114 years ago
- Founder: Carlone family
- Headquarters: Campobasso, Italy
- Key people: Giuseppe Ferro, CEO
- Products: Pasta, flour, tomato sauce
- Owner: Ferro Group
- Website: www.lamolisana.it

La Molisana ("The One from Molise") is an Italian food company based in Campobasso. It was founded in 1912.

It is one of the largest pasta producers in Italy. The company exports products to about 50 countries and offers private-label production services. It was one of 13 companies which together accounted for 16% of U.S. pasta imports from Italy as of 2025.
