= Massimiliano Allegri =

Italian football manager (born 1967)

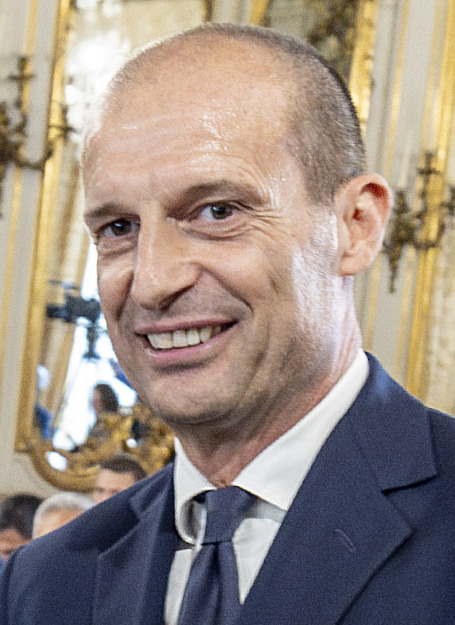
- Allegri in 2024

Personal information
- Full name: Massimiliano Allegri
- Date of birth: 11 August 1967 (age 59)
- Place of birth: Livorno, Italy
- Height: 1.83 m (6 ft 0 in)
- Position: Midfielder

Team information
- Current team: Napoli (head coach)

Senior career*
Years	Team	Apps	(Gls)
1984–1985	Cuoiopelli	7	(0)
1985–1988	Livorno	29	(0)
1988–1989	Pisa	2	(0)
1989–1990	Livorno	32	(8)
1990–1991	Pavia	29	(5)
1991–1993	Pescara	64	(16)
1993–1995	Cagliari	46	(4)
1995–1997	Perugia	41	(10)
1997	Padova	21	(0)
1997–1998	Napoli	7	(0)
1998–2000	Pescara	46	(4)
2000–2001	Pistoiese	18	(1)
2001–2003	Aglianese	32	(8)
Total		374	(56)

Managerial career
- 2003–2004: Aglianese
- 2004–2005: SPAL
- 2005–2006: Grosseto
- 2006–2007: Grosseto
- 2007–2008: Sassuolo
- 2008–2010: Cagliari
- 2010–2014: AC Milan
- 2014–2019: Juventus
- 2021–2024: Juventus
- 2025–2026: AC Milan
- 2026–: Napoli
- * Club domestic league appearances and goals

Massimiliano "Max" Allegri (Italian pronunciation: [massimiˈljaːno alˈleːɡri, -ˈlɛː-]; born 11 August 1967) is an Italian professional football manager and former professional player who is currently the head coach of Serie A club Napoli.

During his playing career, Allegri played in the Serie A as a midfielder with Pisa, Pescara, Cagliari, Perugia and Napoli. In 2002, he won the Serie D title with Aglianese, with whom he retired as a player. During his time in Livorno, due to his lean body and quickness, he was referred to as "Acciughina" (Little Anchovy), a nickname the Italian press still uses to address him.

After beginning his managerial career in 2003 with several smaller Italian sides, Allegri helped Sassuolo gain promotion to the Serie B for the first time in their history, winning the Serie C1 championship and Super Cup in the same year. From 2008 to 2010, he coached Cagliari in Serie A, leading them to their best Serie A finish in almost 15 years. His performances as head coach of Cagliari earned him a move to AC Milan in 2010, where he remained until January 2014; he won a Scudetto in 2010–11, Milan's first since 2004, and a Supercoppa Italiana title in 2011. Between 2014 and 2019, Allegri was in charge of Juventus, with whom he won eleven trophies: five consecutive league titles (from 2015 to 2019), four Coppa Italia titles in a row (from 2015 to 2018) and two Supercoppa Italiana titles (2015 and 2018); he also reached two UEFA Champions League finals (2015 and 2017). He returned to Juventus in 2021, following two years away from management. In his second period at the club, he won another Coppa Italia in 2024, but was sacked only a couple days later, largely due to his behaviour during and after the final, which the club deemed incompatible with its values. He returned as manager of AC Milan in May 2025 and served until July 2026.

Individually, Allegri won the Panchina d'Oro (Golden Bench) four times (2009, 2015, 2017 and 2018) and was four times Serie A Coach of the Year (2011, 2015, 2016 and 2018), as well as being awarded the Enzo Bearzot Award (2015) and inducted into the Italian Football Hall of Fame (2018). He is also the only coach in Italian football history to have won five Scudetti and four Coppa Italia titles consecutively, and the only one in Europe's top five leagues to have won a domestic double for four consecutive seasons.

== Club career ==
After spending the earlier part of his career in the lower leagues, including his hometown club Livorno, Allegri joined Pescara in 1991. A talented and creative player, he established himself in midfield as Giovanni Galeone's side won promotion to Serie A in 1992. Allegri was an outstanding performer for Pescara in Serie A. Despite the side's relegation in last place, there was no shortage of goals and Allegri scored an impressive 12 goals from midfield. He moved on to Cagliari and then Perugia and Napoli before returning to Pescara. Brief spells at Pistoiese and Aglianese followed before his retirement from active football in 2003.

Alongside five other Italian footballers, Allegri received a one-year ban for match-fixing following a Coppa Italia tie in 2000. The Italian Football Federation (FIGC) also handed one-year suspensions to Fabio Gallo, Sebastiano Siviglia, and Luciano Zauri of Serie A side Atalanta; and Alfredo Aglietti of Serie B's Pistoiese. In 2001, all players were cleared of the offences.

== Managerial career ==
=== Early career ===
Allegri started his managerial career in 2004, serving as the manager of Serie C2 team Aglianese, the club where he spent his two final years as a player. Following an impressive season with them, Allegri was called to head Grosseto, then in Serie C1, but his experience with the biancorossi proved not to be as successful as with Aglianese and he was ultimately sacked shortly after the beginning of the 2006–07 Serie C1 season. Shortly after being sacked by Grosseto, Allegri agreed to rejoin his mentor Giovanni Galeone at Udinese, becoming part of his coaching staff. However, this practice proved to be forbidden by the Italian football laws because he was still contracted with the Tuscan club, which caused Allegri to be disqualified for three months in early 2008.

=== Sassuolo ===
In August 2007, Allegri became head coach of ambitious Serie C1 team Sassuolo, who Allegri managed to lead quickly into the top league spots. On 27 April 2008, Sassuolo mathematically ensured the 2007–08 Serie C1/A league title, thus winning a historical first promotion to Serie B for the neroverdi.

=== Cagliari ===
On 29 May 2008, Allegri was announced as new head coach of Cagliari in the Serie A, replacing Davide Ballardini. Despite a disappointing start, with five losses in the first five league matches, Allegri was confirmed by club chairman Massimo Cellino and later went on to bring his team up to a mid-table placement in December. On 9 December, following a 1–0 home win to Palermo, Cagliari announced they had agreed a two-year contract extension with Allegri, with a new contract that was set to expire on 1 June 2011. The contract was then revealed to have been signed in October, in the midst of the rossoblu's early crisis.

He completed the 2008–09 season in an impressive ninth place, their best result in Serie A in almost fifteen years, which was hailed as a huge result in light of the limited resources, the lack of top-class players, and the high quality of Cagliari's attacking football style, which led the Sardinians not far from UEFA Europa League qualification. Such results led him to be awarded the Panchina d'Oro (Golden bench), a prize awarded to the best Serie A football manager according to other managers' votes, ahead of Serie A winning coach José Mourinho. In the 2009–10 season, he managed to confirm Cagliari's high footballing levels despite the loss of regular striker Robert Acquafresca, leading an impressive number of three players from his side—namely Davide Biondini, Federico Marchetti, and Andrea Cossu—to receive Italy national team call-ups during his reign at the club.

On 13 April 2010, Cagliari surprisingly removed Allegri from his managerial duties despite a solid 12th place with 40 points, and youth coach Giorgio Melis—with Gianluca Festa as his assistant—was appointed as his replacement.

=== AC Milan ===
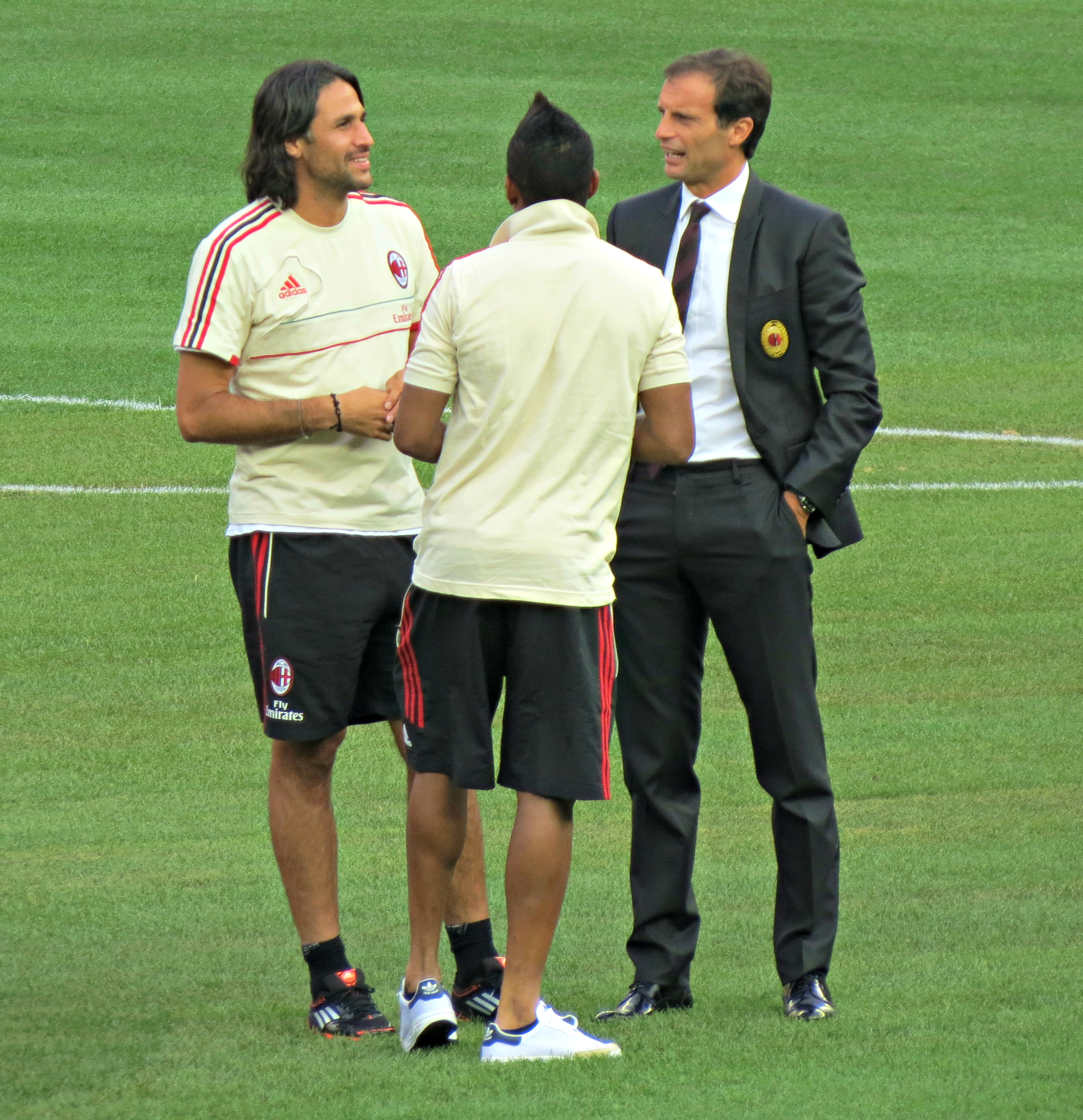
Allegri with Mario Yepes and Robinho in 2012

Allegri was released from his contract by Cagliari on 17 June 2010, under request of Serie A giants AC Milan, who were interested in appointing him as their new manager. On 25 June, Allegri was officially appointed as the new manager of Milan. In his first season in charge, Allegri led Milan to their first championship title since 2004, beating title incumbents and cross-city rivals Inter Milan in both league fixtures; at the time, only Roberto Mancini had achieved that feat at a younger age. Allegri's Milan side, however, failed to make it past the semi-finals of the Coppa Italia, losing to Palermo 4–3 on aggregate. The team also competed in the knockout stage of the UEFA Champions League, where they were eliminated by Tottenham Hotspur.

Success continued in his second season at the club. He led Milan to their sixth Supercoppa Italiana title on 6 August 2011, by coming from behind in a 2–1 win over city rivals Inter in a game played at the Beijing National Stadium. That was as far as his success went for that season, however. A semi-final Coppa Italia knockout at the hands of Juventus followed by a quarter-final UEFA Champions League knockout at the hands of Barcelona left Milan fighting on only one front towards the end of the season—the Scudetto. Even that was to be lost, however, with the Rossoneri finishing in second place to Juventus and therefore qualifying for next season's Champions League group stage. The season was also marked with controversy however, as in the second half of the season, Milan had a goal by Sulley Muntari disallowed in a key match against title rivals Juventus at the San Siro, after they had already been leading 1–0; the match eventually ended in a 1–1 draw. Along with Adriano Galliani, Allegri drew criticism for his decision to sell veteran deep-lying playmaker Andrea Pirlo to Juventus, after excluding him from the starting eleven the previous season, and deeming him to be a surplus due to his age; Pirlo went on to play a key role in Juventus' victorious Serie A title.

On 13 January 2012, Allegri agreed to extend his contract with Milan to the end of 2013–14 season. With the departure and retirement of several of the club's key players, Milan struggled at the beginning of the 2012–13 season, and had only collected 8 points from their first 7 games, putting Allegri in danger of getting fired early on. Despite all the criticism from the critics, Milan stuck with Allegri and he managed to get the best out of some younger players including Stephan El Shaarawy, Milan's home-grown player Mattia De Sciglio and later on Mario Balotelli. Allegri managed to steer the Rossoneri from 16th place to a 3rd-place finish at the end of the season, with an epic 2–1 comeback victory away to Siena. The result gave Milan a spot in the playoff round for the 2013–14 Champions League campaign.

On 1 June 2013, club president Silvio Berlusconi confirmed Allegri to remain as the manager of Milan, despite numerous speculations that he would be given the sack. On 31 December 2013, Allegri confirmed he would leave the club at the end of the season, telling Gazzetta dello Sport: "Of course this is my last Christmas at AC Milan". However, Milan reported that Allegri and his staff were relieved of their duties with immediate effect on 13 January 2014.

=== Juventus ===
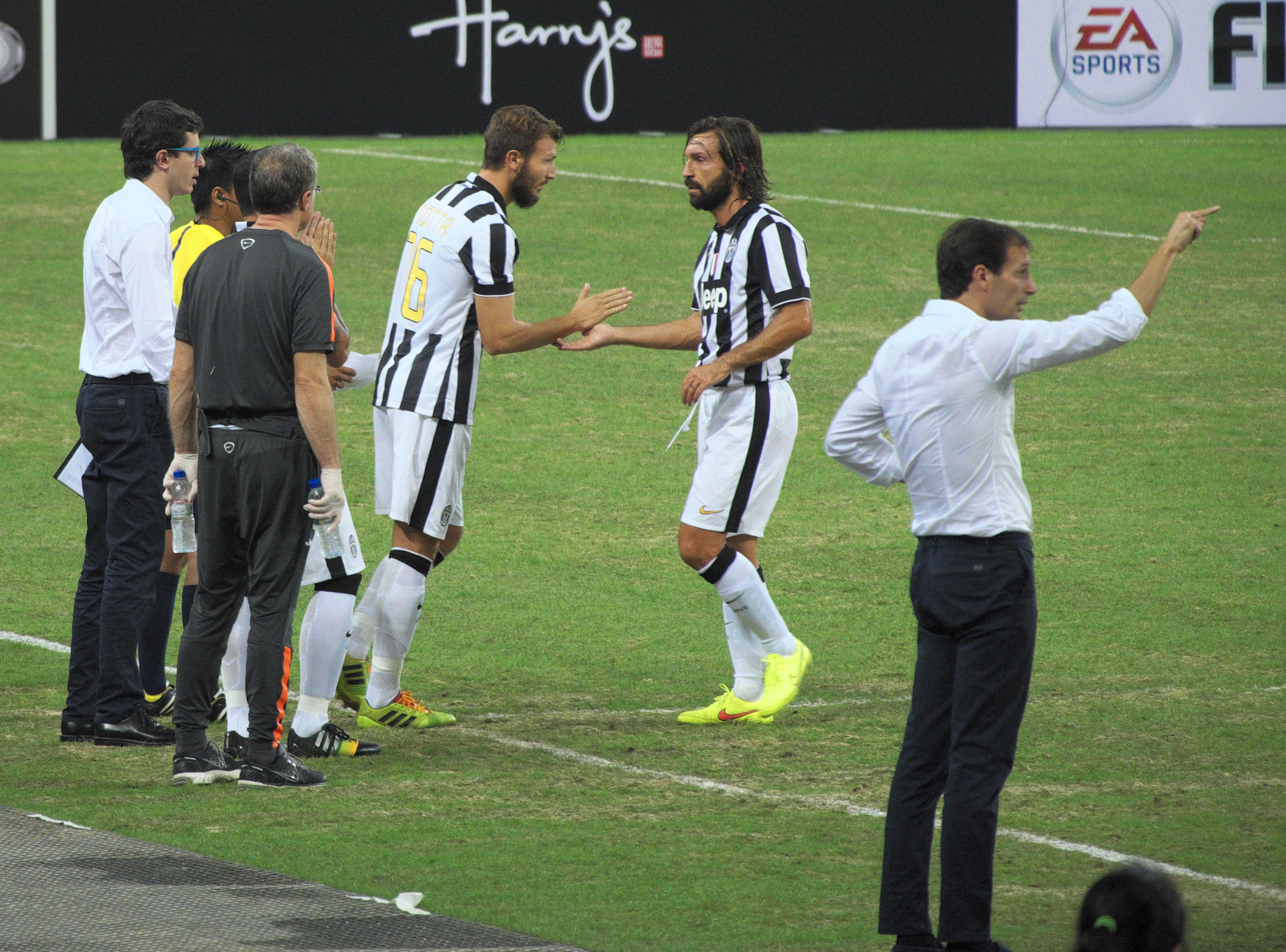
Allegri (right) coaching Juventus in 2014

On 16 July 2014, Allegri was appointed as the new head coach of Juventus, replacing Antonio Conte who had resigned the day before. Although the decision to hire Allegri was initially met with ambivalence, on 2 May 2015, he guided Juventus to their fourth consecutive Serie A title, as the club defeated Sampdoria 1–0 at the Stadio Luigi Ferraris in Genoa; this was only the second time Juventus had won four consecutive Scudetto titles (the last time being from 1931 to 1935, when they won five Scudetto titles in a row). Having previously won the title with AC Milan in 2011, it also marked his second Scudetto title as a manager in Serie A. On 13 May 2015, Allegri guided Juventus to the Champions League final by defeating defending champions Real Madrid in the semifinals, 3–2 on aggregate; it had been twelve years since the Bianconeri had last appeared in the final, eventually losing to Milan 3–2 on penalties in 2003. A week later, on 20 May 2015, Allegri guided Juventus to a domestic double by helping the club win their record tenth Coppa Italia, defeating Lazio 2–1 in extra time. The Old Lady last won the trophy in 1995, breaking their twenty-year drought of having not won the competition, and making them the first team in Italy to win the trophy ten times. On 6 June 2015, Juventus were defeated by Barcelona, 3–1, in the 2015 UEFA Champions League final.

On 6 July 2015, almost a year after signing with Juventus, Allegri signed a one-year extension to his current contract keeping him at the club until the end of the 2016–17 season. On 8 August 2015, Allegri led Juventus to a 2–0 victory over Lazio in the Supercoppa Italiana, with new signings Mario Mandžukić and Paulo Dybala scoring the goals. Allegri was included in the 10-man shortlist of nominees for the 2015 FIFA World Coach of the Year Award, but was later not included among the three finalists, despite almost completing a treble in his first season as Juventus' coach. However, on 14 December 2015, Allegri won the Serie A Coach of the Year award; and later on 7 March 2016, his second ever Panchina d'Oro for his success with Juventus during the 2014–15 season. On 25 April, Juventus were crowned 2015–16 Serie A champions; after initially struggling during the first ten league matches of the season, Juventus went on an unbeaten streak and won 24 of their next 25 league games to come back from 12th place to defend the title. The team's unbeaten streak ended after 26 matches, and was broken following a 2–1 away loss to Verona on 8 May. On 6 May, Allegri extended his contract as Juventus manager to 2018. On 21 May, he led Juventus to the domestic double once again after a 1–0 victory over Milan in the 2016 Coppa Italia Final, the first team in Italy to win back-to-back doubles.

On 17 May 2017, Allegri led Juventus to their 12th Coppa Italia title in a 2–0 win over Lazio, becoming the first team to win three consecutive championships. Four days later on 21 May, following a 3–0 win over Crotone, Juventus secured their sixth consecutive Serie A title, establishing an all-time record of successive triumphs in the competition. On 3 June 2017, Allegri entered his second Champions League Final in three years with Juventus, but suffered a 4–1 defeat to defending champions Real Madrid. On 7 June, Allegri renewed his contract with Juventus until 2020. Allegri took charge of his 200th game with Juventus on 9 February 2018, a 2–0 away win over Fiorentina. On 9 May 2018, Allegri won his fourth consecutive Coppa Italia title, in a 4–0 win over Milan. Four days later on 13 May, following a 0–0 draw with Roma, Allegri secured his fourth consecutive Serie A title, becoming the first manager in Europe's top five leagues to win four consecutive doubles. On 17 May 2019, after Juventus had already secured its fifth straight Scudetto under Allegri on 20 April, Juventus announced that he would leave the club at the end of the season. Allegri left Juventus in 2019 with a win percentage of 70.48%, the highest in the history of Juventus to date.

=== Return to Juventus ===
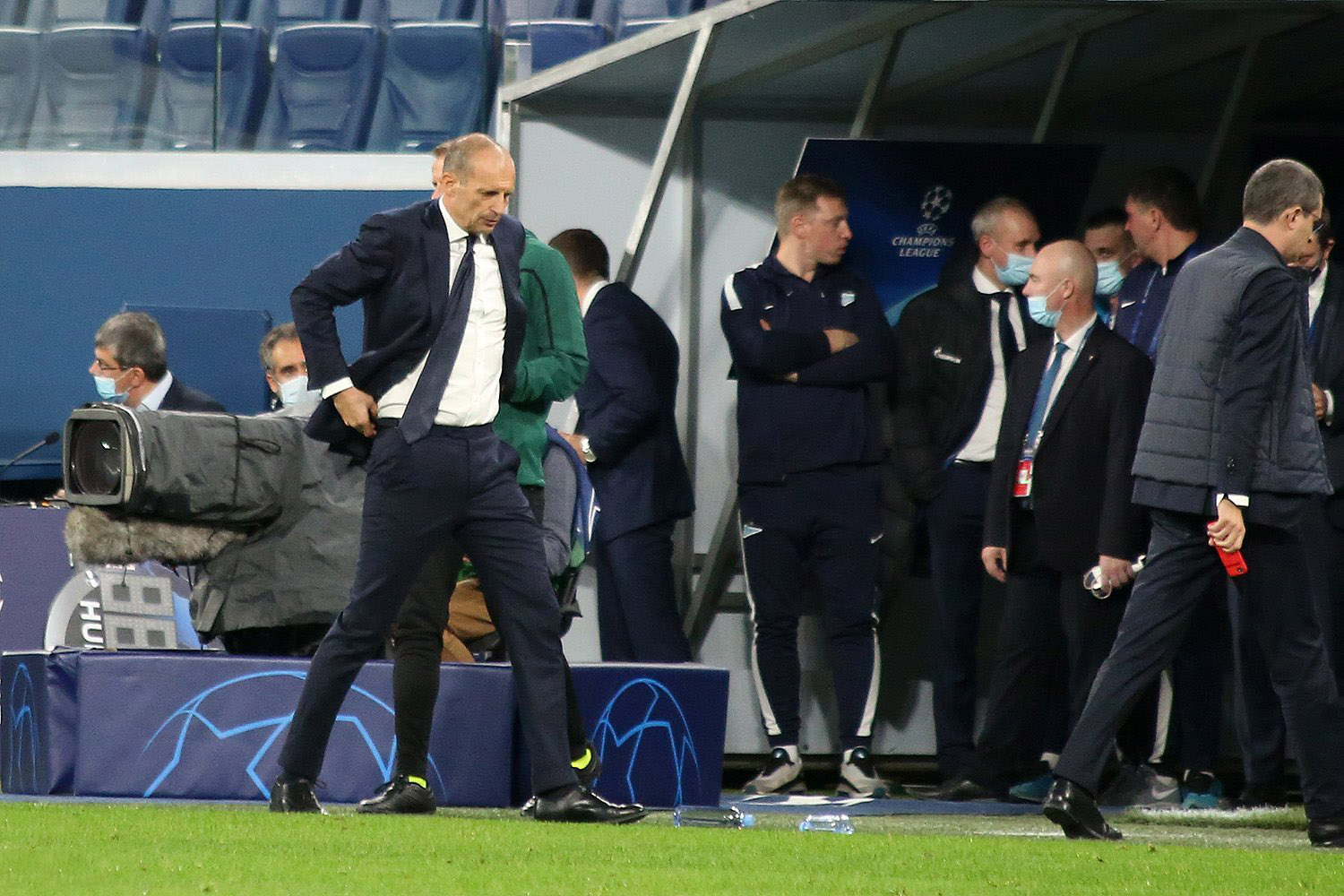
Allegri as Juventus head coach in 2021

On 28 May 2021, Juventus announced Allegri's return to the club as manager after two years away from management, replacing the sacked Andrea Pirlo on a four-year contract. Allegri's first match since his return came on 22 August, in a 2–2 away draw against Udinese. On 23 November, Juventus lost 4–0 to Chelsea at Stamford Bridge; the team had not lost with such disadvantage since February 2004. On 15 January 2022, Allegri reached his 300th bench with Juventus, in the league return match to Udinese. On 16 March, Juventus were eliminated from the 2021–22 UEFA Champions League after a 3–0 home defeat to Villarreal. On 11 May, following to the Bianconeri's 4–2 loss after extra time to Inter in the Coppa Italia final, the 2021–22 season ended up trophyless, for the first time since 2010–11, under Luigi Delneri's guide.

On 2 November, he featured in his 100th Champions League match in a 2–1 home defeat against Paris Saint-Germain. The match against PSG was Juventus' last Champions League match of the season; the team made their worst-ever Champions League campaign, having won only three points, from a victory and five defeats, with 13 goals conceded during the group stage. For the first time since 2013–14, Juventus placed third in the group stage, because of a better goal difference with Israeli team Maccabi Haifa, obtaining access to the UEFA Europa League. In the same month, Allegri won the Serie A Coach of the Month award, following to three league victories to Inter, Hellas Verona and Lazio.

On 13 January 2023, Juventus ended an eight-game winning streak in Serie A with no goals conceded following by a 5–1 loss to Napoli; Juventus had not conceded so many goals since Pescara–Juventus 5–1 (30 May 1993), in which Allegri himself scored the first goal the match while playing for Pescara. Allegri's second season upon his return ended up trophy less again after a 2–1 loss to Sevilla after extra-time in the Europa League semi-finals. The last manager not to win any trophy in two seasons was Rino Marchesi, who coached Juventus from 1986 to 1988.

On 15 May 2024, Allegri was sent off in Juventus's 1–0 victory over Atalanta in the 2024 Coppa Italia final; with the victory, he became the first manager to win the title five times. Following the game, he was also reported to have angrily attacked the referees, threatened a journalist and waved off sporting director Cristiano Giuntoli during the post-match celebrations. He was sacked just two days later on 17 May, reportedly in large part due to the incident.

=== Return to AC Milan ===
On 30 May 2025, Allegri was appointed as the new AC Milan manager replacing Sérgio Conceição, returning to the club 11 years after his first tenure ended. A year later, on 25 May, following the club's failure to qualify for the UEFA Champions League, he was sacked by the club.

=== Napoli ===
On 3 July 2026, Allegri was appointed as the new head coach of Napoli on a three-year deal, replacing outgoing manager Antonio Conte.

== Style of management ==
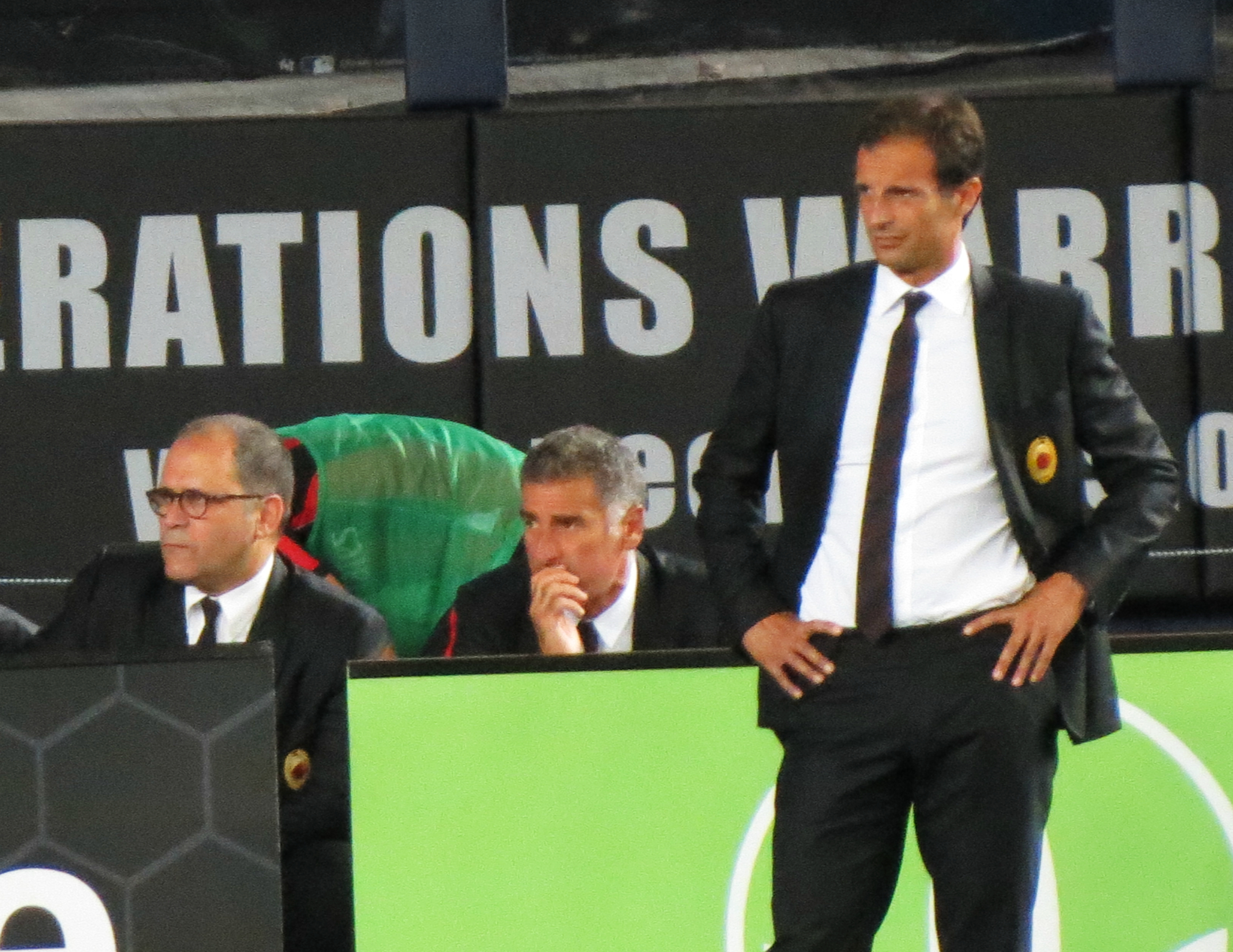
Allegri managing AC Milan in 2012

Allegri has been praised for his tactical intelligence and his ability to build effectively upon Antonio Conte's successful tactics and winning mentality as Juventus' manager, albeit in a less rigorous manner. He initially continued to use Conte's trademark 3–5–2 formation, but later switched to a four-man back-line, in particular in the UEFA Champions League. Under Allegri, Juventus became slightly less aggressive and intense in their pressing off the ball while their playing style became more patient and focused on keeping possession and gaining territorial advantage in order to conserve energy, tactics which he had previously used while at Milan. Although Allegri's team was still effective at winning the ball in midfield and scoring from counter-attacks, the club's attacking play on the ball usually involved a slower build-up, which mainly consisted of short passes, and fewer long balls from Pirlo and Bonucci. Goalkeeper Buffon also continued to primarily play the ball out from the back with short ground passes to the defenders, but he also began to use deeper goal kicks out to the wings. Allegri has also been lauded for his versatility, which he demonstrated by adopting and switching between several different formations during his first season with Juventus, including the 4–3–1–2, the 4–4–2 and the 4–3–3 formations, which he had also previously adopted while at Milan in order to find the most suitable system for his players. The fluidity of Juventus' formations under Allegri allowed talented players more freedom and creative licence and enabled the midfielders to make attacking runs into the area. Despite implementing several changes, Allegri still managed to preserve Juventus' defensive organisation and strength—this was further demonstrated by his tendency to switch to the 3–5–2 in the final 20 minutes of closely contested matches in order to hold on to the result as well as by his tendency to play behind the ball with two deep, tight defensive lines when facing teams that dominated possession, preferring instead to focus on breaking up play and adopting a counter-attacking style of play similar to that which he had previously also used with Milan.

Pirlo praised Allegri's seemingly more relaxed attitude to coaching stating that he "brought a sense of calm" to the team and that he aided in endowing the players with a sense of confidence. Regarding Juventus' fluidity under Allegri, Italian football analyst Antonio Gagliardi tweeted: "Juventus defend low with a 5–4–1, they press with a 4–4–2 and they attack with a 4–2–3–1. Systems in the future will become ever more fluid". In his second season with the club, Allegri was praised for rebuilding the team following the departure of several key players, such as Pirlo, Vidal and Tevez; and for his role in inspiring Juventus to a comeback to defend the league title, which included a 15-match winning streak after a negative start. Although a 1–0 defeat to Sassuolo on 28 October 2015 left them in 12th place, 11 points from the top of the table after their first 10 league matches, Juventus went unbeaten in their next 25 fixtures, winning 24 of them and finished the season as 2015–16 Serie A champions with three games to spare—this was the club's record fifth consecutive league title since the 2011–12 season.

During the 2016–17 season, Allegri drew further praise in the media for his decision to occasionally depart from the team's trademark 3–5–2 formation and instead adopt a new 4–2–3–1 formation, in particular for European matches, a system which better suited the characteristics of the club's new signings—the tactical switch most notably saw Gonzalo Higuaín fielded as the team's main striker while Dybala was used in a more creative role as number 10, backed by two central box-to-box midfielders (usually the more defensive-minded Sami Khedira alongside either Miralem Pjanić or Claudio Marchisio in a deeper playmaking role) and flanked by Juan Cuadrado on the right wing. The switch to a four-man back-line also allowed Allegri to rotate several players, such as centre-backs Giorgio Chiellini, Andrea Barzagli and Leonardo Bonucci as well as right-backs Dani Alves and Stephan Lichtsteiner, while centre-forward Mario Mandžukić was deployed in a deeper, wider role as a winger or attacking midfielder on the left flank—this new position utilised the Croatian's work-rate, intelligence, hold-up play and ability to cover for teammates making overlapping runs, in particular those of left-back Alex Sandro while Mandžukić's height and ability in the air also enabled him to function essentially as a "target man" in wider areas.

Juventus' tactical versatility was demonstrated by their ability to switch between the 3–5–2 and 4–2–3–1 formations during matches; this trait was particularly evident in the team's first leg fixture of the Champions League semi-final against Monaco. Ahead of the match, Allegri fielded Dani Alves as a right-sided wing-back in a 3–5–2 formation in lieu of Cuadrado and reverted to the team's trademark back-three composed of Barzagli, Bonucci and Chiellini. When in possession, Juventus kept the ball and played it out from the back and usually attacked with a 3–2–4–1, 3–4–3 or 4–2–3–1 formation as Dani Alves often made offensive overlapping runs behind the opposition's defence, essentially acting as a winger, which created difficulties for Monaco's back-line while Barzagli moved out wide to cover for the Brazilian, functioning as a makeshift right-back. When defending behind the ball, the team reverted to an organised 3–5–2 or 5–3–2 formation, which was difficult for Monaco to break down, courtesy of the strength of Juventus' defensive trio, who were dubbed "the BBC" in the media, a reference to the defenders' initials—Juventus' defensive solidity ensured that the club only conceded three goals en route to the 2017 Champions League final and also allowed the Turin side to create goalscoring opportunities from swift, sudden and efficient counter-attacks after winning back possession. Juventus ended the season by capturing their third consecutive domestic double, which included an unprecedented Italian record sixth consecutive league title; and also reached the Champions League final for the second time in three years, losing out 4–1 to defending champions Real Madrid.

During the 2017–18 season, Allegri deployed holding midfielder Blaise Matuidi in a new position, playing him out wide, rather than in the centre, as a left-sided defensive winger or attacking midfielder in a 4–2–3–1 formation, with Matuidi often tucking into the centre off the ball, in order to help support the midfield defensively. This role was similar to that which he occupied with the France national football team under manager Didier Deschamps, in particular during the team's victorious 2018 FIFA World Cup campaign.

In 2024, Brazilian defender and Juventus captain Danilo praised Allegri for his intelligence and ability to manage his teams' players off the pitch. Allegri described football as being "simple" that same year. However, while he has been lauded in the media for his player-management skills, he has also earned both praise and criticism by pundits over his rigid, pragmatic style and defensive tactics, in particular during his second stint at Juventus, where the team's lacklustre game-play and his conservative and perceived "old-fashioned" style were thought to have stifled several of the team's talented younger players, despite being effective.

== Personal life ==
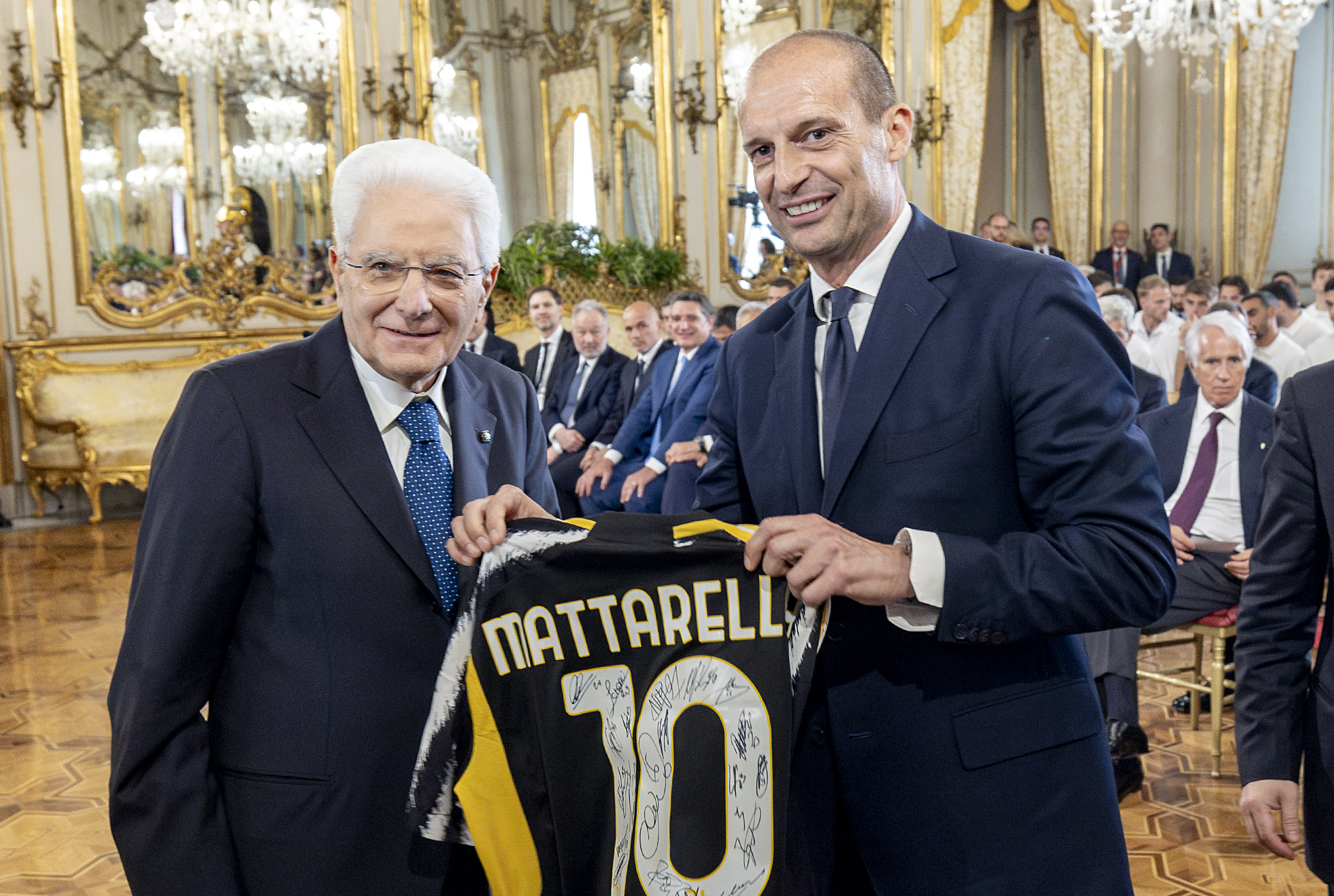
Allegri with Sergio Mattarella in 2024

Allegri was born in Livorno to a father who worked at the port of Livorno and a mother who was a nurse, and grew up in Coteto. In 1992, when he was 24, he called off his wedding with his fiancée Erika two days before the ceremony. In 1994, Allegri married model Gloria Patrizi, fathering a child Valentina a year later; he later fathered another child, Giorgio, in 2011 with another woman, Claudia. From 2017, Allegri was in a relationship with actress Ambra Angiolini; the couple broke up in 2021.

== Managerial statistics ==
As of 21 November 2026

Managerial record by team and tenure
Team	Nat	From	To	Record							
Team	Nat	From	To	G	W	D	L	GF	GA	GD	Win %
Aglianese	(Italy)	1 July 2003	30 June 2004	38	10	13	15	30	35	−5	26.32
SPAL	(Italy)	1 July 2004	30 May 2005	40	13	15	12	47	41	+6	32.50
Grosseto	(Italy)	19 July 2005	26 October 2005	20	6	9	5	21	18	+3	30.00
Grosseto	(Italy)	17 April 2006	29 October 2006	10	1	6	3	12	15	−3	10.00
Sassuolo	(Italy)	17 July 2007	28 May 2008	42	23	6	13	56	43	+13	54.76
Cagliari	(Italy)	29 May 2008	13 April 2010	74	27	15	32	100	106	−6	36.49
AC Milan	(Italy)	25 June 2010	13 January 2014	178	91	49	38	303	178	+125	51.12
Juventus	(Italy)	16 July 2014	26 May 2019	271	191	43	37	511	195	+316	70.48
Juventus	(Italy)	1 July 2021	17 May 2024	149	80	34	35	221	138	+83	53.69
AC Milan	(Italy)	30 May 2025	25 May 2026	42	22	10	10	58	38	+20	52.38
Napoli	(Italy)	3 July 2026	present	16	6	3	7	25	25	+0	37.50
Career Total				880	470	203	207	1,384	832	+552	53.41

== Honours ==
=== Player ===
Livorno

- Coppa Italia Serie C: 1986–87

Aglianese

- Serie D: 2001–02 (group D)

=== Manager ===
Sassuolo

- Serie C1: 2007–08

Milan

- Serie A: 2010–11
- Supercoppa Italiana: 2011

Juventus

- Serie A: 2014–15, 2015–16, 2016–17, 2017–18, 2018–19
- Coppa Italia: 2014–15, 2015–16, 2016–17, 2017–18, 2023–24
- Supercoppa Italiana: 2015, 2018

Individual

- Panchina d'Oro Prima Divisione: 2007–08
- Panchina d'Oro: 2008–09, 2014–15, 2016–17, 2017–18
- Serie A Coach of the Year: 2011, 2015, 2016, 2018
- Enzo Bearzot Award: 2015
- Gazzetta Sports Awards – Coach of the Year: 2018
- Italian Football Hall of Fame: 2018
- Serie A Coach of the Month: November 2022, November 2023 September 2025, November 2025
