= Piero Trapanelli =

Italian footballer (1924–2023)

Personal information
- Date of birth: 13 July 1924
- Place of birth: Milan, Italy
- Date of death: 30 August 2023 (aged 99)
- Position: Winger

Senior career*
Years	Team	Apps	(Gls)
1941–1943	Milan		
1944	Cremonese		
1945–1946	Milan		
1946–1948	Varese	72	(20)
1948–1951	Pisa	104	(25)
1951–1952	Treviso	20	(0)
- * Club domestic league appearances and goals

Piero Trapanelli (13 July 1924 – 30 August 2023) was an Italian football player and coach.

== Career ==
Trapanelli played football as a winger for A.C. Milan in the pre-war period and again briefly after the war. He would later enjoy success with A.S. Varese 1910, Pisa Calcio and Treviso F.B.C. 1993 before retiring to become a manager.

== Personal life ==
Trapanelli was born in Milan. He died on 30 August 2023, at the age of 99.
