= 1940–41 Bologna FC 1909 season =

Bologna Associazione Giuoco del Calcio
1940-41 season
- Chairman: Renato Dall'Ara
- Manager: Hermann Felsner
- Stadium: Littoriale
- Serie A: 1st
- Coppa Italia: Quarterfinals
- Top goalscorer: League: Ettore Puricelli (22); All: Puricelli (28)
Home colours	Away colours

During the 1940–41 season Bologna Associazione Giuoco del Calcio competed in Serie A and Coppa Italia.

== Summary ==
Even with the war the season started four months before, Bologna won its fourth title; This was the last trophy for the club until the 60s: the next season Bologna grab the 7th spot and the, due to war, the tournament was in fact suspended. Also, Uruguayan striker Puricelli repeated his feat as capocannoniere with 22 goals At the end of the tournament, Felsner returned to his country Germany in a first signal of the end of an era for the club.

== Squad ==
Note: Flags indicate national team as defined under FIFA eligibility rules; some limited exceptions apply. Players may hold more than one non-FIFA nationality.

Pos.	Nation	Player
GK	ITA	Pietro Ferrari
GK	ITA	Glauco Vanz
DF	ITA	Arturo Boniforti
DF	ITA	Giordano Corsi
DF	ITA	Dino Fiorini
DF	ITA	Aurelio Marchese
DF	ITA	Mario Montesanto
DF	ITA	Mario Pagotto
DF	ITA	Secondo Ricci
MF	ITA	Michele Andreolo
MF	ITA	Narciso Benetti

Pos.	Nation	Player
MF	ITA	Amedeo Biavati
MF	ITA	Tolmino Casadio
MF	ITA	Giovanni Ferrari
MF	ITA	Raffaele Sansone
FW	ITA	Piero Andreoli
FW	ITA	Antonio Innocenti
FW	ITA	Bruno Maini
FW	URU	Héctor Puricelli
FW	ITA	Carlo Reguzzoni
FW	ITA	Mario Sdraulig

== Competitions ==
=== Serie A ===
==== League table ====
Pos	Team	Pld	W	D	L	GF	GA	GR	Pts
1	Bologna (C)	30	16	7	7	60	37	1.622	39
2	Ambrosiana-Inter	30	14	7	9	52	42	1.238	35
3	Milano	30	12	10	8	55	34	1.618	34
4	Fiorentina	30	14	6	10	60	49	1.224	34
5	Juventus	30	12	8	10	50	47	1.064	32

Source: goal average officially used in event of equal points.
(C) Champions

==== Matches ====
Win Draw Loss

6 October 1940 1	Bologna	2–1	Roma	Bologna
	Puricelli 30' (pen.); G. Ferrari 56'	Report	54' Amadei	Stadium: Stadio Littoriale; Attendance: 12 000; Referee: Francesco Mattea

13 October 1940 2	Juventus	3–1	Bologna	Turin
	Gabetto 1', 6', 21'	Report	83' G. Ferrari	Stadium: Stadio Benito Mussolini; Attendance: 25 000; Referee: Rinaldo Barlassina

20 October 1940 3	Bologna	3–0	Torino	Bologna
	Maini 48'; Puricelli 65'; Andreolo 82' (pen.)	Report		Stadium: Stadio Littoriale; Attendance: 11500; Referee: Ferruccio Bonivento

27 October 1940 4	Genoa	0–1	Bologna	Genoa
		Report	38' Puricelli	Stadium: Stadio Luigi Ferraris; Attendance: 18,000; Referee: Barlassina

3 November 1940 5	Bologna	1–0	Atalanta	Bologna
	Biavati 44'	Report		Stadium: Stadio Littoriale; Attendance: 12,000; Referee: Renzo Curradi

10 November 1940 6	Napoli	4–4	Bologna	Naples
	Barrera 15'; Rosellini 40', 53', 75'	Report	35' Puricelli; 62', 88' Reguzzoni; 70' Andreoli	Stadium: Stadio Partenopeo; Attendance: 20 000; Referee: Generoso Dattilo

17 November 1940 7	Bologna	1–1	Venezia	Bologna
	Puricelli 20'	Report	35' Alberti	Stadium: Stadio Littoriale; Referee: Giacomo Bertolio

24 November 1940 8	Novara	0–1	Bologna	Novara
		Report	68' (pen.) Reguzzoni	Stadium: Stadio Littorio; Attendance: 9 000; Referee: Mario Ciamberlini

8 December 1940 9	Bologna	5–1	Bari	Bologna
	Reguzzoni 32'; Andreoli 37', 68'; Puricelli 57', 82'	Report	60' C. Fabbri	Stadium: Stadio Littoriale; Attendance: 7000; Referee: Giuseppe Fois

15 December 1940 10	Ambrosiana-Inter	2–1	Bologna	Milan
	Candiani 3', 12'	Report	64' Sansone	Stadium: Arena Civica; Referee: Rinaldo Barlassina

22 December 1940 11	Bologna	4–2	Milan	Bologna
	Puricelli 9', 15'; Reguzzoni 20', 52'	Report	58' Todeschini; 85' B. Arcari	Stadium: Stadio Littoriale; Referee: Bertolio

29 December 1940 12	Livorno	2–2	Bologna	Livorno
	Cattaneo 18'; Ricci 60' (o.g.)	Report	3', 42' Puricelli	Stadium: Stadio Edda Ciano Mussolini; Referee: Ciamberlini

5 January 1941 13	Bologna	5–3	Fiorentina	Bologna
	Reguzzoni 26'; Andreoli 35'; Puricelli 36', 48'; Biavati 52'	Report	70' (o.g.) Pagotto; 77' Di Benedetti; 86' (pen.) R. Menti	Stadium: Stadio Littoriale; Attendance: 6500; Referee: Mattea

12 January 1941 14	Bologna	2–0	Triestina	Bologna
	Puricelli 46', 82'	Report		Stadium: Stadio Littoriale; Attendance: 6000; Referee: Umberto Biancone

19 January 1941 15	Lazio	2–4	Bologna	Rome
	Vettraino 44'; Ramella 60'	Report	2' Andreoli; 19' (pen.) Reguzzoni; 64' Puricelli; 87' Biavati	Stadium: Stadio Nazionale del PNF; Attendance: 18 000; Referee: Achille Pizziolo

26 January 1941 16	Roma	1–1	Bologna	Rome
	Amadei 49'	Report	30' Andreolo	Stadium: Stadio Nazionale del PNF; Attendance: 20 000; Referee: Mario Ciamberlini

2 February 1941 17	Bologna	1–0	Juventus	Bologna
	Reguzzoni 82'	Report		Stadium: Stadio Littoriale; Referee: Generoso Dattilo

11 February 1941 18	Torino	0–0	Bologna	Turin
16:15 UTC+1		Report		Stadium: Stadio Filadelfia; Attendance: 16 000; Referee: Giuseppe Scarpi

16 February 1941 19	Bologna	4–1	Genoa 1941	Bologna
	Sansone 27'; Reguzzoni 60'; Puricelli 75', 85'	Report	77' Gabardo	Stadium: Stadio Littoriale; Attendance: 9 000; Referee: Giacomo Bertolio

23 February 1941 20	Atalanta	2–0	Bologna	Bergamo
	Gaddoni 41'; Pagliano 70'	Report		Stadium: Stadio Mario Brumana; Attendance: 8 000; Referee: Achille Pizziolo

2 March 1941 21	Bologna	3–0	Napoli	Bologna
	Puricelli 65', 76'; Reguzzoni 68'	Report		Stadium: Stadio Littoriale; Attendance: 7 500; Referee: Emiliano Saracini

9 March 1941 22	Venezia	1–0	Bologna	Venice
	Loik 35'	Report		Stadium: Stadio Pier Luigi Penzo; Attendance: 12000; Referee: Mario Ciamberlini

16 March 1941 23	Bologna	3–0	Novara	Bologna
	Reguzzoni 8'; Andreoli 59', 67'	Report		Stadium: Stadio Littoriale; Referee: Generoso Dattilo

23 March 1941 24	Bari	1–0	Bologna	Bari
	Fabbri 17'	Report		Stadium: Stadio della Vittoria; Attendance: 20000; Referee: Renzo Curradi

30 March 1941 25	Bologna	5–0	Ambrosiana-Inter	Bologna
	Reguzzoni 13', 88'; Puricelli 30'; Biavati 46', 83'	Report		Stadium: Stadio Littoriale; Attendance: 24000; Referee: Ciamberlini

6 April 1941 26	Milan	5–1	Bologna	Milan
	E. Boniforti 50' (pen.); Boffi 57'; Cappello 59', 85'; Meazza 73'	Report	61' Marchese	Stadium: Stadio San Siro; Referee: Bertolio

13 April 1941 27	Bologna	3–0	Livorno	Bologna
	Reguzzoni 10', 20'; Puricelli 26'	Report		Stadium: Stadio Littoriale; Attendance: 7500; Referee: Barlassina

20 April 1941 28	Fiorentina	3–0	Bologna	Florence
	Penzo 32', 66'; Koenig 87'	Report		Stadium: Stadio Giovanni Berta; Attendance: 15000; Referee: Giorgio Moretti

27 April 1941 29	Triestina	0–0	Bologna	Trieste
		Report		Stadium: Stadio Littorio; Attendance: 6000; Referee: Achille Pizziolo

4 May 1941 30	Bologna	2–2	Lazio	Bologna
	Reguzzoni 43'; Biavati 47'	Report	22' Romagnoli; 30' Vettraino	Stadium: Stadio Littoriale; Attendance: 6500; Referee: Mario Ciamberlini

=== Coppa Italia ===
==== Round of 32 ====
11 May 1941	Siena	1–1	Bologna	Siena
	Polacchi 83'		80' G. Ferrari	Stadium: Stadio Rino Daus; Attendance: 4000; Referee: Giuseppe Fois

15 May 1941	Siena	0–0	Bologna	Siena
				Stadium: Stadio Rino Daus; Attendance: 4000; Referee: Giorgio Moretti

18 May 1941 replay	Bologna	6–3	Siena	Bologna
10:00 UTC+1	Biavati 8', 39'; Reguzzoni 54' (pen.); Puricelli 67', 71', 73'		50', 59' Polacchi; 88' Boldi	Stadium: Stadio Littoriale; Referee: Oreste Dellarole

==== Eightfinals ====
22 May 1941	Bologna	3–1	Livorno	Bologna
	Sdraulig 37', 119'; Puricelli 115'		5' Stua	Stadium: Stadio Littoriale; Attendance: 5000; Referee: Emiliano Saracini

==== Quarterfinals ====
25 May 1941	Bologna	3–4	Venezia	Bologna
	Puricelli 32', 66'; Sdraulig 70' (pen.)		5' Loik; 31' Alberico; 40', 75' Pernigo	Stadium: Stadio Littoriale; Referee: Achille Pizziolo

== Statistics ==
=== Squad statistics ===
Competition	Points	Home						Away						Total						GD
Competition	Points	G	W	D	L	Gs	Ga	G	W	D	L	Gs	Ga	G	W	D	L	Gs	Ga	GD
Serie A	39	15	13	2	0	44	11	15	3	5	7	16	26	30	16	7	7	60	37	+23
Coppa Italia		3	2	0	1	12	8	1	0	1	0	0	0	4	2	1	1	12	8	+4
Total		18	15	2	1	56	19	16	3	6	7	16	26	34	18	8	8	72	45	+27

=== Players statistics ===
==== Appearances ====
- 26. (Italy) Piero Andreoli
- 24. (Italy) Michele Andreolo
- 2. (Italy) Narciso Benetti
- 34. (Italy) Amedeo Biavati
- 11. (Italy) Arturo Boniforti
- 1. (Italy) Tolmino Casadio
- 4. (Italy) Giordano Corsi
- 20. (Italy) Giovanni Ferrari
- 29. (Italy) Pietro Ferrari
- 15. (Italy) Dino Fiorini
- 1. (Italy) Antonio Innocenti
- 14. (Italy) Bruno Maini
- 27. (Italy) Aurelio Marchese
- 8. (Italy) Mario Montesanto
- 32. (Italy) Mario Pagotto
- 30. (Uruguay) Héctor Puricelli
- 31. (Italy) Carlo Reguzzoni
- 30. (Italy) Secondo Ricci
- 25. (Italy) Raffaele Sansone
- 5. (Italy) Mario Sdraulig
- 5. (Italy) Glauco Vanz

==== Goalscorers ====
- 7. (Italy) Piero Andreoli
- 2. (Italy) Michele Andreolo
- 8. (Italy) Amedeo Biavati
- 2. (Italy) Giovanni Ferrari
- 1. (Italy) Bruno Maini
- 1. (Italy) Aurelio Marchese
- 28. (Uruguay) Héctor Puricelli
- 18. (Italy) Carlo Reguzzoni
- 2. (Italy) Raffaele Sansone
- 3. (Italy) Mario Sdraulig

== Bibliography ==
- Almanacco illustrato del calcio - La storia 1898-2004. Panini, Modena, 2004, Panini.
- Carlo F. Chiesa. Il grande romanzo dello scudetto. Calcio 2000.
