= 1936–37 Bologna FC 1909 season =

Bologna Associazione Giuoco del Calcio
1936–37 season
- President: Renato Dall'Ara
- Manager: Árpád Weisz
- Serie A: 1st(in Mitropa Cup)
- Coppa Italia: round of 32
- Mitropa Cup: Eightfinals
- Torneo Internazionale dell'Expo Universale di Paris 1937: Winners
- Top goalscorer: League: Reguzzoni (12); All: Reguzzoni (13)
Home colours	Away colours

During the 1936–37 season Bologna Associazione Giuoco del Calcio competed in Serie A, Coppa Italia, Mitropa Cup and International Tournament of 1937 Paris Expo.

== Summary ==
The club won its second title in a row, defeating Lazio and Torino in an exciting race

After clinched the trophy came 1937 Mitropa Cup, defeating early by Austria Vienna, and winning a friendly tournament in Paris defeating Chelsea in Final.

== Squad ==
Note: Flags indicate national team as defined under FIFA eligibility rules; some limited exceptions apply. Players may hold more than one non-FIFA nationality.

Pos.	Nation	Player
GK	ITA	Carlo Ceresoli
GK	ITA	Pietro Ferrari
DF	ITA	Giordano Corsi
DF	ITA	Dino Fiorini
DF	ITA	Felice Gasperi
DF	ITA	Mario Montesanto
DF	ITA	Mario Pagotto
MF	ITA	Michele Andreolo
MF	ITA	Amedeo Biavati

Pos.	Nation	Player
MF	ITA	Aldo Donati
MF	ITA	Francisco Fedullo
MF	ITA	Raffaele Sansone
FW	ITA	Giovanni Busoni
FW	ITA	Lodovico De Filippis
FW	ITA	Bruno Maini
FW	ITA	Carlo Reguzzoni
FW	ITA	Angelo Schiavio

== Competitions ==
=== Serie A ===
==== League table ====
Pos	Team	Pld	W	D	L	GF	GA	GD	Pts	Qualification or relegation
1	Bologna (C)	30	15	12	3	45	26	+19	42	1937 Mitropa Cup
2	Lazio	30	17	5	8	56	42	+14	39	1937 Mitropa Cup
3	Torino	30	13	12	5	50	25	+25	38	
4	Milan	30	13	10	7	39	29	+10	36	
5	Juventus	30	12	11	7	53	31	+22	35	

Source: Panini
(C) Champions

==== Matches ====
Win Draw Loss

13 September 1936 1	Alessandria	0–1	Bologna	Alessandria
		Report	23' Fedullo	Stadium: Campo del Littorio; Referee: Generoso Dattilo

20 September 1936 2	Bologna	2–2	Bari	Bologna
	Andreolo 3'; Busoni 19'	Report	56' Violi; 63' (o.g.) Andreolo	Stadium: Stadio Littoriale; Referee: Marcello Salvagno

27 September 1936 3	Ambrosiana-Inter	0–1	Bologna	Milan
		Report	21' Reguzzoni	Stadium: Arena Civica; Referee: Giuseppe Scarpi

4 October 1936 4	Bologna	1–1	Lazio	Bologna
	Montesanto 72'	Report	57' Busani	Stadium: Stadio Littoriale; Referee: Rinaldo Barlassina

11 October 1936 5	Lucchese	2–2	Bologna	Lucca
	Andreoli 4'; Coppa 86'	Report	37' Biavati; 55' Reguzzoni	Stadium: Stadio Porta Elisa; Referee: Generoso Dattilo

18 October 1936 6	Bologna	4–1	Sampierdarenese	Bologna
	Fedullo 3'; Montesanto 47'; Busoni 80', 84'	Report	5' Mascheroni	Stadium: Stadio Littoriale; Referee: Emiliano Saracini

1 November 1936 7	Genoa	0–1	Bologna	Genoa
		Report	62' Busoni	Stadium: Stadio Luigi Ferraris; Attendance: 18 000; Referee: Giuseppe Scarpi

8 November 1936 8	Bologna	0–1	Torino	Bologna
		Report	81' Galli	Stadium: Stadio Littoriale; Attendance: 20 000; Referee: Gino Mazzarini

22 November 1936 9	Napoli	0–1	Bologna	Naples
		Report	75' Reguzzoni	Stadium: Stadio Giorgio Ascarelli; Attendance: 15 000; Referee: Rinaldo Barlassina

29 November 1936 10	Bologna	1–1	Juventus	Bologna
	Busoni 46'	Report	35' Gabetto	Stadium: Stadio Littoriale; Referee: Giuseppe Scarpi

6 December 1936 11	Roma	0–1	Bologna	Rome
		Report	67' Reguzzoni	Stadium: Campo Testaccio; Attendance: 15 000; Referee: Francesco Mattea

20 December 1936 12	Bologna	1–1	Fiorentina	Bologna
	Busoni 64'	Report	42' Viani II	Stadium: Stadio Littoriale; Attendance: 12 000; Referee: Rinaldo Barlassina

27 December 1936 13	Triestina	1–2	Bologna	Trieste
	Pasinati 66'	Report	13' Busoni; 39' Reguzzoni	Stadium: Stadio Littorio; Referee: Mario Scotto

3 January 1937 14	Bologna	5–1	Novara	Bologna
	Fedullo 14', 61'; Busoni 76', 80'; Corsi 82'	Report	19' Romano	Stadium: Stadio Littoriale; Referee: Gialma Bevilacqua

10 January 1937 15	Milan	1–0	Bologna	Milan
	Bonizzoni 65' (pen.)	Report		Stadium: Stadio San Siro; Attendance: 25 000; Referee: Scarpi

17 January 1937 16	Bologna	4–0	Alessandria	Bologna
	Reguzzoni 40', 45', 56'; Sansone 53'	Report		Stadium: Stadio Littoriale; Referee: Giorgio Moretti

24 January 1937 17	Bari	0–1	Bologna	Bari
		Report	20' Reguzzoni	Stadium: Stadio della Vittoria; Attendance: 10 000; Referee: Bevilacqua

31 January 1937 18	Bologna	1–0	Ambrosiana-Inter	Bologna
	Reguzzoni 33'	Report		Stadium: Stadio Littoriale; Attendance: 10 000; Referee: Mattea

7 February 1937 19	Lazio	0–0	Bologna	Rome
		Report		Stadium: Stadio Nazionale del PNF; Attendance: 25 000; Referee: Barlassina

14 February 1937 20	Bologna	0–0	Lucchese	Bologna
		Report		Stadium: Stadio Littoriale; Referee: Giacomo Bertolio

21 February 1937 21	Sampierdarenese	2–2	Bologna	Genoa
	Cappellini 3'; Mascheroni 27'	Report	36' Andreolo; 79' Reguzzoni	Stadium: Stadio del Littorio; Attendance: 10 000; Referee: Gialma Bevilacqua

28 February 1937 22	Bologna	4–4	Genoa	Bologna
	De Filippis 24'; Andreolo 39', 48'; Corsi 79'	Report	3', 44' Arcari III; 16' Fasanelli; 35' Marchionneschi	Stadium: Stadio Littoriale; Referee: Marcello Salvagno

7 March 1937 23	Torino	3–3	Bologna	Turin
	Buscaglia 36'; Prato 47'; Galli 79'	Report	53' (o.g.) Allasio; 60' Maini; 64' Sansone	Stadium: Stadio Filadelfia; Attendance: 30 000; Referee: Lelio Salvatori

14 March 1937 24	Bologna	2–1	Napoli	Bologna
	Andreolo 9'; Maini 47'	Report	65' Ferrara I	Stadium: Stadio Littoriale; Referee: Otello Sassi

28 March 1937 25	Juventus	0–0	Bologna	Turin
		Report		Stadium: Stadio Benito Mussolini; Referee: Rinaldo Barlassina

4 April 1937 26	Bologna	1–0	Roma	Bologna
	Sansone 83'	Report		Stadium: Stadio Littoriale; Attendance: 10 000; Referee: Mario Ciamberlini

18 April 1937 27	Fiorentina	0–0	Bologna	Florence
		Report		Stadium: Stadio Giovanni Berta; Attendance: 18 000; Referee: Mario Scotto

2 May 1937 28	Bologna	2–0	Triestina	Bologna
	Reguzzoni 9'; Andreolo 54'	Report		Stadium: Stadio Littoriale; Referee: Giorgio Moretti

9 May 1937 29	Novara	4–0	Bologna	Novara
	Torri 43'; Fiorini 50' (o.g.); Rizzotti 69'; Bellini 88'	Report		Stadium: Stadio Littorio; Referee: Emiliano Saracini

16 May 1937 30	Bologna	2–0	Milan	Bologna
	Schiavio 10', 38'	Report		Stadium: Stadio Littoriale; Referee: Gialma Bevilacqua

=== Coppa Italia ===
==== Round of 32 ====
6 January 1937	Sampierdarenese	1–0	Bologna	Genoa
	Spivach 7'			Stadium: Stadio del Littorio; Referee: Francesco Mattea

=== Mitropa Cup ===
==== Eightfinals ====
13 June 1937	Bologna	1–2	Austria Vienna	Bologna
	Reguzzoni 35'		67' Neumer; 79' Sindelar	Stadium: Stadio Littoriale; Attendance: 15 000; Referee: (Hungary) Rertaks

27 June 1937	Austria Vienna	5–1	Bologna	Wien
	Sindelar 3'; Nausch 18', 67', 75'; Jerusalem 88'		90' Schiavio	Stadium: Prater; Attendance: 40.000; Referee: (Czech Republic) Zenicek

== Statistics ==
=== Squad statistics ===
Competition	Points	Home						Away						Total						GD
Competition	Points	G	W	D	L	Gs	Ga	G	W	D	L	Gs	Ga	G	W	D	L	Gs	Ga	GD
Serie A	42	15	8	6	1	30	13	15	7	6	2	15	13	30	15	12	3	45	26	+19
Coppa Italia		-	-	-	-	-	-	1	0	0	1	0	1	1	0	0	1	0	1	-1
Mitropa Cup		1	0	0	1	1	2	1	0	0	1	1	5	2	0	0	2	2	7	-5
Total		16	8	6	2	31	15	17	7	6	4	16	19	33	15	12	6	47	34	+13

=== Players statistics ===
No.	Pos	Nat	Player	Total		Serie A		Coppa Italia		Mitropa Cup	
No.	Pos	Nat	Player	Apps	Goals	Apps	Goals	Apps	Goals	Apps	Goals
		(Italy) ITA	Michele Andreolo	28	6	25	6	1	0	2	0
		(Italy) ITA	Amedeo Biavati	17	1	16	1	1	0	-	-
		(Italy) ITA	Giovanni Busoni	31	9	29	9	1	0	1	0
		(Italy) ITA	Carlo Ceresoli	30	-26	27	-18	1	-1	2	-7
		(Italy) ITA	Giordano Corsi	33	2	30	2	1	0	2	0
		(Italy) ITA	Lodovico De Filippis	4	1	4	1	-	-	-	-
		(Italy) ITA	Aldo Donati	5	0	5	0	-	-	-	-
		(Italy) ITA	Francisco Miope llo	32	4	30	4	2	0	-	-
		(Italy) ITA	Pietro Ferrari	3	-8	3	-8	-	-	-	-
		(Italy) ITA	Dino Fiorini	33	0	30	0	1	0	2	0
		(Italy) ITA	Felice Gasperi	13	0	15	0	-	-	2	0
		(Italy) ITA	Bruno Maini	13	2	11	2	1	0	1	0
		(Italy) ITA	Mario Montesanto	33	2	30	2	1	0	2	0
		(Italy) ITA	Mario Pagotto	16	0	15	0	1	0	-	-
		(Italy) ITA	Carlo Reguzzoni	32	13	29	12	1	0	2	1
		(Italy) ITA	Raffaele Sansone	32	3	29	3	1	0	2	0
		(Italy) ITA	Angelo Schiavio	4	3	2	2	0	0	2	1

== Bibliography ==
- Almanacco illustrato del calcio – La storia 1898–2004, Modena. Panini.
- Carlo F. Chiesa. Il grande romanzo dello scudetto. Calcio 2000 years 1936 and 1937.
- "Stadio Il Littoriale, 1936 and 1937". Corriere dello Sport.
- "Championship 1936 and 1937". La Stampa. Archived from the original on 2011-04-11.
