= 1938–39 Bologna FC 1909 season =

Bologna Associazione Giuoco del Calcio
1938-39 season
- President: Renato Dall'Ara
- Manager: Árpád Weisz, (until 26 October 1938); Hermann Felsner
- Serie A: 1st (in Mitropa Cup )
- Coppa Italia: round of 32
- Mitropa Cup: Semifinals
- Top goalscorer: League: Puricelli (19); All: Puricelli (23)
Home colours	Away colours

During the 1938-39 season Bologna Associazione Giuoco del Calcio competed in Serie A, Coppa Italia and Mitropa Cup.

== Summary ==
The club won its 5th league championship ever, winning the race against Torino. Weisz was replaced by German manager Felsner on round 6 The squad, after a 4-0 score against Napoli on 21 May 1939, clinched the title. With the trophy of Italian champions, the club reached a decent place in 1939 Mitropa Cup semifinals defeated by Ferencváros.

== Squad ==
Note: Flags indicate national team as defined under FIFA eligibility rules; some limited exceptions apply. Players may hold more than one non-FIFA nationality.

Pos.	Nation	Player
GK	ITA	Carlo Ceresoli
GK	ITA	Pietro Ferrari
DF	ITA	Dino Fiorini
DF	ITA	Mario Montesanto
DF	ITA	Mario Pagotto
DF	ITA	Secondo Ricci
DF	ITA	Aldo Tugnoli
MF	ITA	Michele Andreolo
MF	ITA	Giordano Corsi

Pos.	Nation	Player
MF	ITA	Francisco Fedullo
MF	ITA	Aurelio Marchese
MF	ITA	Raffaele Sansone
FW	ITA	Piero Andreoli
FW	ITA	Amedeo Biavati
FW	ITA	Bruno Maini
MF	URU	Ettore Puricelli
FW	ITA	Carlo Reguzzoni
FW	ITA	Alcide Ivan Violi

== Competitions ==
=== Serie A ===
==== League table ====
Pos	Team	Pld	W	D	L	GF	GA	GR	Pts	Qualification or relegation
1	Bologna (C)	30	16	10	4	53	31	1.710	42	1939 Mitropa Cup
2	Torino	30	14	10	6	45	34	1.324	38	
3	Ambrosiana-Inter	30	14	9	7	55	37	1.486	37	1939 Mitropa Cup
4	Genova 1893	30	14	7	9	53	30	1.767	35	
5	Roma	30	14	3	13	39	35	1.114	31	

Source: goal average officially used in event of equal points.
(C) Champions

==== Matches ====
Win Draw Loss

18 September 1938 1	Genoa	2–3	Bologna	Genoa
	Scarabello 8'; Cattaneo 81'	Report	39' Montesanto; 59' Biavati; 77' Puricelli	Stadium: Stadio Luigi Ferraris; Attendance: 14 000; Referee: Giacomo Bertolio

Jack Prims, April 21, 1846 2	Bologna	4–3	Bari	Bologna
	Reguzzoni 8', 41' (pen.); Marchese 13'; Puricelli 60'	Report	20' (pen.) Del Bianco; 39' Costantino; 59' Grossi	Stadium: Stadio Littoriale; Referee: Aniello Mazza

2 October 1938 3	Livorno	3–1	Bologna	Livorno
	Viani II 2', 10', 72'	Report	87' (pen.) Reguzzoni	Stadium: Stadio Edda Ciano Mussolini; Attendance: 8 000; Referee: Mario Scotto

9 October 1938 4	Bologna	0–3	Torino	Bologna
		Report	40' Petron; 73' Bo; 87' Gaddoni	Stadium: Stadio Littoriale; Referee: Mario Ciamberlini

16 October 1938 5	Bologna	2–0	Lazio	Bologna
	Puricelli 29'; Andreolo 39'	Report		Stadium: Stadio Littoriale; Attendance: 9 000; Referee: Rinaldo Barlassina

30 October 1938 6	Novara	1–3	Bologna	Novara
	Torri 35'	Report	33' (o.g.) Mornese; 38' Puricelli; 79' Andreolo	Stadium: Stadio Littorio; Attendance: 7 000; Referee: Attilio Soliani

6 November 1938 7	Bologna	2–1	Milan	Bologna
	Reguzzoni 14'; Puricelli 40'	Report	53' (pen.) Cossio	Stadium: Stadio Littoriale; Referee: Renzo Curradi

13 November 1938 8	Liguria	1–2	Bologna	Genoa
	Spivach 84'	Report	43' Maini; 76' Andreolo	Stadium: Stadio del Littorio; Attendance: 18 000; Referee: Generoso Dattilo

27 November 1938 9	Bologna	1–0	Juventus	Bologna
	Sansone 32'	Report		Stadium: Stadio Littoriale; Attendance: 5 000; Referee: Giorgio Moretti

11 December 1938 10	Triestina	1–1	Bologna	Trieste
	Trevisan 51'	Report	72' Puricelli	Stadium: Stadio Littorio; Attendance: 7 000; Referee: Francesco Mattea

18 December 1938 11	Bologna	2–2	Lucchese	Bologna
	Reguzzoni 78'; Biavati 82'	Report	48' Pomponi; 75' Stella	Stadium: Stadio Littoriale; Attendance: 6 000; Referee: Luigi Pirovano

1 January 1939 12	Modena	1–1	Bologna	Modena
	Bazan 37'	Report	9' Reguzzoni	Stadium: Stadio Cesare Marzari; Attendance: 12 000; Referee: Generoso Dattilo

8 January 1939 13	Bologna	1–0	Roma	Bologna
	Sansone 54'	Report		Stadium: Stadio Littoriale; Referee: Giacomo Bertolio

15 January 1939 14	Napoli	1–6	Bologna	Naples
	Rocco 88'	Report	7' Reguzzoni; 23' Sansone; 45' Biavati; 46', 65' Puricelli; 89' Andreoli	Stadium: Stadio Giorgio Ascarelli; Attendance: 8 000; Referee: Achille Pizziolo

22 January 1939 15	Bologna	1–1	Ambrosiana-Inter	Bologna
	Puricelli 31'	Report	49' (pen.) Meazza	Stadium: Stadio Littoriale; Attendance: 20 000; Referee: Giacomo Bertolio

29 January 1939 16	Bologna	3–0	Genoa	Bologna
	Andreolo 10'; Biavati 44'; Puricelli 78'	Report		Stadium: Stadio Littoriale; Attendance: 9 000; Referee: Rinaldo Barlassina

5 February 1939 17	Bari	2–2	Bologna	Bari
	Grossi 32'; Capocasale 39'	Report	6', 47' Puricelli	Stadium: Stadio della Vittoria; Attendance: 7 000; Referee: Giovanni Tonnetti

12 February 1939 18	Bologna	1–1	Livorno	Bologna
	Puricelli 72'	Report	42' Conti	Stadium: Stadio Littoriale; Attendance: 7 000; Referee: Rinaldo Barlassina

19 February 1939 19	Torino	1–1	Bologna	Turin
	Baldi III 23'	Report	73' Sansone	Stadium: Stadio Filadelfia; Attendance: 25 000; Referee: Generoso Dattilo

26 February 1939 20	Lazio	1–2	Bologna	Rome
	Busani 39'	Report	14' Sansone; 83' Puricelli	Stadium: Stadio Nazionale del PNF; Attendance: 18 000; Referee: Rinaldo Barlassina

5 March 1939 21	Bologna	3–0	Novara	Bologna
	Andreolo 11'; Biavati 37'; Puricelli 74'	Report		Stadium: Stadio Littoriale; Attendance: 7 000; Referee: Achille Pizziolo

12 March 1939 22	Milan	0–1	Bologna	Milan
		Report	69' Puricelli	Stadium: San Siro; Attendance: 35 000; Referee: Generoso Dattilo

19 March 1939 23	Bologna	1–1	Liguria	Bologna
	Biavati 53'	Report	34' Gabardo	Stadium: Stadio Littoriale; Attendance: 10 000; Referee: Giacomo Bertolio

2 April 1939 24	Juventus	1–0	Bologna	Turin
	Varglien II 64'	Report		Stadium: Stadio Benito Mussolini; Attendance: 10 000; Referee: Rinaldo Barlassina

9 April 1939 25	Bologna	2–0	Triestina	Bologna
	Fedullo 11'; Biavati 89'	Report		Stadium: Stadio Littoriale; Attendance: 7 500; Referee: Emiliano Saracini

16 April 1939 26	Lucchese	1–1	Bologna	Lucca
	Rosellini 50'	Report	37' Puricelli	Stadium: Stadio Porta Elisa; Referee: Generoso Dattilo

21 April 1939 27	Bologna	1–1	Modena	Bologna
	Sansone 77'	Report	25' Sentimenti III	Stadium: Stadio Littoriale; Attendance: 10 000; Referee: Attilio Soliani

30 April 1939 28	Roma	0–1	Bologna	Rome
		Report	47' Puricelli	Stadium: Campo Testaccio; Attendance: 12 000; Referee: Rinaldo Barlassina

21 May 1939 29	Bologna	4–0	Napoli	Bologna
	Andreolo 5'; Reguzzoni 67'; Castello 77' (o.g.); Puricelli 85'	Report		Stadium: Stadio Littoriale; Attendance: 6 000; Referee: Giovanni Galeati

28 May 1939 30	Ambrosiana-Inter	2–0	Bologna	Milan
	Candiani 38'; Guarnieri 64'	Report		Stadium: Arena Civica; Referee: Generoso Dattilo

=== Coppa Italia ===
==== Round of 32 ====
25 December 1938	Triestina	1–0	Bologna	Trieste
	Colaussi 119'			Stadium: Stadio Littorio; Attendance: 3 000; Referee: Giovanni Tonnetti

=== Mitropa Cup ===
==== Quarterfinals ====
18 June 1939	(Romania) Venus	1–0	Bologna	Bucharest
	Ene 9'			Stadium: Stadio Giulești; Referee: (Hungary) Majorski

25 June 1939	Bologna	5–0	(Romania) Venus	Bologna
	Sansone 20'; Maini 46', 68'; Reguzzoni 84', 88'			Stadium: Stadio Littoriale; Attendance: 12 000; Referee: (Czech Republic) Augustin Krist

==== Semifinals ====
9 July 1939	Bologna	3–1	(Hungary) Ferencváros	Bologna
	Puricelli 64', 69', 70'		36' Kiszely	Stadium: Stadio Littoriale; Attendance: 14 000; Referee: (Czech Republic) Augustin Krist

16 July 1939	(Hungary) Ferencváros	4–1	Bologna	Budapest
	Toldi 1', 64', 84', 86'		42' Puricelli	Stadium: Üllői Stadion; Referee: (England) Jim Wiltshire

== Statistics ==
=== Squad statistics ===
Competition	Points	Home						Away						Total						GD
Competition	Points	G	W	D	L	Gs	Ga	G	W	D	L	Gs	Ga	G	W	D	L	Gs	Ga	GD
Serie A	42	15	9	5	1	28	13	15	7	5	3	25	18	30	16	10	4	53	31	+22
Coppa Italia		-	-	-	-	-	-	1	0	0	1	0	1	1	0	0	1	0	1	-1
1939 Mitropa Cup		2	2	0	0	8	1	2	0	0	2	1	5	4	2	0	2	9	6	+3
Total	-	17	11	5	1	36	14	18	7	5	6	26	24	35	18	10	7	62	38	+24

=== Players statistics ===
==== Appearances ====
- 5. (Italy) Piero Andreoli
- 35. (Italy) Michele Andreolo
- 34. (Italy) Amedeo Biavati
- 20. (Italy) Carlo Ceresoli
- 24. (Italy) Giordano Corsi
- 24. (Italy) Francisco Fedullo
- 15. (Italy) Pietro Ferrari
- 8. (Italy) Dino Fiorini
- 21. (Italy) Bruno Maini
- 19. (Italy) Aurelio Marchese
- 18. (Italy) Mario Montesanto
- 35. (Italy) Mario Pagotto
- 32. (Uruguay) Hector Puricelli
- 35. (Italy) Carlo Reguzzoni
- 26. (Italy) Secondo Ricci
- 32. (Italy) Raffaele Sansone
- 1. (Italy) Aldo Tugnoli
- 1. (Italy) Alcide Ivan Violi

==== Goalscorers ====
- 1. (Italy) Piero Andreoli
- 6. (Italy) Michele Andreolo
- 7. (Italy) Amedeo Biavati
- 1. (Italy) Francisco Fedullo
- 3. (Italy) Bruno Maini
- 1. (Italy) Aurelio Marchese
- 1. (Italy) Mario Montesanto
- 23. (Uruguay) Hector Puricelli
- 10. (Italy) Carlo Reguzzoni
- 7. (Italy) Raffaele Sansone

== Bibliography ==
- Almanacco illustrato del calcio - La storia 1898-2004, Modena. Panini.
- Carlo F. Chiesa. Il grande romanzo dello scudetto. da Calcio 2000 years 2002 and 2003.
- "Stadio Il Littoriale, 1938 and 1939". Corriere dello Sport.
- "Championship 1938 and 1939". La Stampa. Archived from the original on 2011-04-11.
