= List of Bologna FC 1909 seasons =

Bologna FC 1909 is an Italian professional football club based in Bologna, Emilia-Romagna, who play their matches in Stadio Renato Dall'Ara. The club was formed in 1909, and joined the Italian league in 1929.

The club has won the Prima Divisione (predecessor of Serie A) twice, the Serie A five times and the Coppa Italia three times.

This list details the club's achievements in major competitions, and the top scorers for each season. The top scorers in bold were also the top scorers in the Italian league that season. Records of local or regional competitions are not included due to them being considered of less importance.

== Key ==
- Pld = Matches played
- W = Matches won
- D = Matches drawn
- L = Matches lost
- GF = Goals for
- GA = Goals against
- Pts = Points
- Pos = Final position
- Serie A = 1st Tier in Italian League
- Serie B = 2nd Tier in Italian League
- Serie C = 3rd Tier in Italian League
- Prima Categoria = 1st Tier (until 1922)
- Promozione = 2nd Tier (until 1922)
- Prima Divisione = 1st Tier (until 1926)
- Prima Divisione = 2nd Tier (1926–1929)
- Seconda Divisione = 2nd Tier (until 1926)
- Seconda Divisione = 3rd Tier (1926–1929)
- Divisione Nazionale = 1st Tier (1926–1929)
- F = Final
- SF = Semi-finals
- QF = Quarter-finals
- R16 = Last 16
- R32 = Last 32
- QR1 = First qualifying round
- QR2 = Second qualifying round
- QR3 = Third qualifying round
- PO = Play-Offs
- 1R = Round 1
- 2R = Round 2
- 3R = Round 3
- GS = Group stage
- 2GS = Second group stage
- LP = League phase
- EC = European Cup (1955–1992)
- UCL = UEFA Champions League (1993–present)
- CWC = UEFA Cup Winners' Cup (1960–1999)
- UC = UEFA Cup (1971–2008)
- UEL = UEFA Europa League (2009–present)
- USC = UEFA Super Cup
- INT = Intercontinental Cup (1960–2004)
- WC = FIFA Club World Cup (2005–present)

**Champions**	Runners-up	Promoted	Relegated	1st Tier	2nd Tier	3rd Tier

== Seasons ==
Results of league and cup competitions by season
Season	Division	Pld	W	D	L	GF	GA	Pts	Pos	Coppa Italia	Supercoppa Italiana	Cup	Result	Player(s)	Goals
Season	League									Coppa Italia	Supercoppa Italiana	UEFA – FIFA		Top goalscorer(s)	
1909–10	Terza Categoria (3); Emilia	2	2	0	0	18	1	4	1st					N/A	
1910–11	Prima Categoria (1); Veneto-Emiliano	6	2	0	4	11	20	4	3rd					Antonio Bernabéu	5
1911–12	Prima Categoria (1); Veneto-Emiliano	6	2	1	3	10	9	5	4th					Antonio Bernabéu Gino Donati	3
1912–13	Prima Categoria (1); Veneto-Emiliano	10	2	0	8	14	30	4	5th					Natalio Rivas	3
1913–14	Prima Categoria (1); Veneto-Emiliano	16	6	4	6	29	35	16	5th					Emilio Badini	8
1914–15	Prima Categoria (1); Girone D	10	2	5	3	15	24	9	3rd					Angelo Badini Emilio Badini	3
1915–16	World War I														
1916–17	World War I														
1917–18	World War I														
1918–19	World War I														
1919–20	Prima Categoria (1); SF Girone C	10; 10	8; 6	2; 1	0; 3	39; 20	5; 14	18; 13	1st 2nd					Emilio Badini Bernardo Perin	13
1920–21	Prima Categoria (1); SF Girone C Final	8; 6; 1	7; 4; 0	1; 2; 0	0; 0; 1	25; 13; 1	5; 4; 2	15; 10; 0	1st 1st RU					Cesrae Alberti	13
1921–22	Prima Categoria (1); Lega Nord Girone A	22	11	5	6	44	22	27	3rd					Cesrae Alberti	14
1922–23	Prima Divisione (1); Lega Nord Girone B	22	11	5	6	66	21	27	3rd					Bernardo Perin	16
1923–24	Prima Divisione (1); Lega Nord Girone B	22	13	5	4	41	18	31	1st					Angelo Schiavio	16
1924–25	Prima Divisione (1); Lega Nord Girone B	24	15	4	5	53	22	34	**W**					Giuseppe Della Valle	17
1925–26	Prima Categoria (1); Lega Nord Girone A	22	17	4	1	74	20	38	1st					Angelo Schiavio	26
1926–27	Divisione Nazionale (1) B Girone Finale	18; 10	11; 5	2; 2	5; 3	38; 14	26; 6	24; 12	1st RU					N/A	
1927–28	Divisione Nazionale (1) B Girone Finale	20; 14	10; 5	7; 5	3; 4	44; 28	16; 18	27; 15	1st 5th					Angelo Schiavio	13
1928–29	Divisione Nazionale (1); Girone B	30	22	5	3	84	32	49	**W**					Angelo Schiavio	29
1929–30	Serie A (1)	34	14	8	12	56	46	36	7th					Bruno Maini	20
1930–31	Serie A (1)	34	21	6	7	81	33	48	3rd					Carlo Reguzzoni	18
1931–32	Serie A (1)	34	21	8	5	85	33	50	2nd					**Angelo Schiavio**	26
1932–33	Serie A (1)	34	15	12	7	69	33	42	3rd					Angelo Schiavio	28
1933–34	Serie A (1)	34	16	10	8	53	33	42	4th					Carlo Reguzzoni	19
1934–35	Serie A (1)	34	11	8	11	46	34	30	6th					Angelo Schiavio	12
1935–36	Serie A (1)	34	15	10	5	39	21	40	**W**	R16				Angelo Schiavio	11
1936–37	Serie A (1)	34	15	12	3	45	26	42	**W**	R32				Carlo Reguzzoni	13
1937–38	Serie A (1)	34	14	9	7	46	34	37	5	QF				Carlo Reguzzoni	17
1938–39	Serie A (1)	34	16	10	4	53	31	42	**W**	R32				**Ettore Puricelli**	23
1939–40	Serie A (1)	34	16	9	5	44	23	41	2nd	R16				Ettore Puricelli Carlo Reguzzoni	14
1940–41	Serie A (1)	34	16	7	7	60	37	39	**W**	QF				**Ettore Puricelli**	28
1941–42	Serie A (1)	30	12	5	13	50	37	29	7th	QF				Ettore Puricelli	16
1942–43	Serie A (1)	30	12	5	13	53	39	29	6th	QF				Frane Matosic	14
1943–44	World War II														
1944–45	World War II														
1945–46	Divisione Nazionale (1)	26	11	4	11	30	33	26	6th					N/A	
1946–47	Serie A (1)	38	15	9	14	42	41	39	5th					Gino Cappello	9
1947–48	Serie A (1)	40	14	12	14	51	52	40	8th					Mario Gritti	10
1948–49	Serie A (1)	38	11	18	9	53	46	41	5th					István Mike Mayer	21
1949–50	Serie A (1)	38	8	16	14	54	63	32	15th					István Mike Mayer	14
1950–51	Serie A (1)	38	16	9	13	61	59	41	6th					Gino Cappello	16
1951–52	Serie A (1)	38	11	11	16	45	55	33	16th					Cesarino Cervellati	14
1952–53	Serie A (1)	34	16	7	11	52	43	39	5th					Giancarlo Bacci	18
1953–54	Serie A (1)	34	14	8	12	50	41	36	6th					Gino Cappello	12
1954–55	Serie A (1)	34	15	10	9	56	47	40	4th					Gino Pivatelli	17
1955–56	Serie A (1)	34	15	7	12	68	52	37	5th					**Gino Pivatelli**	29
1956–57	Serie A (1)	34	12	11	11	54	48	35	5th					Cesarino Cervellati	12
1957–58	Serie A (1)	34	12	10	12	47	43	34	6th	3rd				Ezio Pascutti Gino Pivatelli	12
1958–59	Serie A (1)	34	10	11	13	47	53	31	10th	QF				Ezio Pascutti	17
1959–60	Serie A (1)	34	14	8	12	50	42	36	5th	R16				Gino Pivatelli	14
1960–61	Serie A (1)	34	10	11	13	44	51	31	9th	R16				Luís Vinício	11
1961–62	Serie A (1)	34	19	7	8	57	41	45	4th	2R				Ezio Pascutti Marino Perani	11
1962–63	Serie A (1)	34	17	8	9	58	39	42	4th	R16				**Harald Nielsen**	19
1963–64	Serie A (1)	34	22	10	2	54	18	54	**W**	QF				**Harald Nielsen**	25
1964–65	Serie A (1)	34	11	12	11	43	42	34	6th	QF		EC	QR1	Helmut Haller	11
1965–66	Serie A (1)	34	19	8	7	60	37	46	2nd	1R				Helmut Haller Harald Nielsen	12
1966–67	Serie A (1)	34	18	9	7	48	27	45	3rd	QF		FC	QF	Ezio Pascutti	10
1967–68	Serie A (1)	34	11	11	8	30	23	33	5th	4R		FC	SF	Ezio Pascutti	7
1968–69	Serie A (1)	34	10	9	11	27	36	29	9th	1R		FC	2R	Lucio Mujesan	11
1969–70	Serie A (1)	30	6	16	8	22	24	28	10th	**W**				Giuseppe Savoldi	16
1970–71	Serie A (1)	30	10	14	6	30	24	34	5th	1R		CWC	1R	Giuseppe Savoldi	15
1971–72	Serie A (1)	30	7	11	12	12	28	25	11th	2R		UC	2R	Giuseppe Savoldi	11
1972–73	Serie A (1)	30	11	9	10	33	31	31	7th	2R				**Giuseppe Savoldi**	17
1973–74	Serie A (1)	30	6	17	7	35	36	29	9th	**W**				Giuseppe Savoldi	22
1974–75	Serie A (1)	30	10	12	8	36	33	32	7th	2R		CWC	1R	Giuseppe Savoldi	15
1975–76	Serie A (1)	30	9	14	7	32	32	32	7th	GS				Stefano Chiodi Sergio Clerici	8
1976–77	Serie A (1)	30	8	11	11	32	32	32	7th	2R				Sergio Clerici	9
1977–78	Serie A (1)	30	7	12	11	21	32	26	12th	1R				Gianluca De Ponti	7
1978–79	Serie A (1)	30	4	16	10	23	30	24	13th	1R				Antonio Bordon	7
1979–80	Serie A (1)	30	8	14	8	23	24	30	7th	1R				Giuseppe Savoldi	11
1980–81	Serie A (1)	30	11	12	7	32	27	29	7th	SF				Salvatore Garritano	10
1981–82	Serie A (1)	30	6	11	13	25	37	23	15th	1R				Roberto Mancini	9
1982–83	Serie B (2)	38	9	14	15	31	47	32	18th	R16				Mauro Gibellini	6
1983–84	Serie C1 (3)	34	17	14	3	46	21	48	2nd	1R				Sauro Frutti	17
1984–85	Serie B (2)	38	9	18	11	25	31	36	9th	GS				Domenico Marocchino	7
1985–86	Serie B (2)	38	15	11	12	37	29	41	6th	GS				Loris Pradella	12
1986–87	Serie B (2)	38	10	16	12	40	38	36	10th	QF				Lorenzo Marronaro	9
1987–88	Serie B (2)	38	17	17	4	62	37	51	1st	R16				Lorenzo Marronaro	21
1988–89	Serie A (1)	34	8	13	13	26	43	29	14th	GS				Fabio Poli	10
1989–90	Serie A (1)	34	9	16	9	29	36	34	8th	3R				Bruno Giordano	7
1990–91	Serie A (1)	34	4	10	20	29	63	22	18th	QF		UC	QF	Kubilay Türkyilmaz	9
1991–92	Serie B (2)	38	12	12	14	37	41	36	11th	1R				Kubilay Türkyilmaz	10
1992–93	Serie B (2)	38	9	12	17	38	55	30	18th	1R				Giuseppe Incocciati	10
1993–94	Serie C1 (3)	34	17	7	10	41	26	58	4th	1R				Luca Cecconi	11
1994–95	Serie C1 (3)	38	16	17	5	42	23	65	1st	SF				Luca Cecconi	14
1995–96	Serie B (2)	34	24	9	1	59	17	81	1st	QF				Carlo Nervo	7
1996–97	Serie A (1)	34	13	10	11	50	44	49	7th	SF				Igor Kolyvanov	12
1997–98	Serie A (1)	34	12	12	10	55	46	48	8th	R16				Roberto Baggio	23
1998–99	Serie A (1)	34	11	11	12	44	47	44	9th	SF		UC	SF	Giuseppe Signori	15
1999–2000	Serie A (1)	34	9	13	12	32	39	40	11th	R16		UC	R32	Giuseppe Signori	19
2000–01	Serie A (1)	34	11	10	13	49	53	43	10th	2R				Giuseppe Signori	16
2001–02	Serie A (1)	34	15	7	12	40	40	52	7th	R16				Julio Ricardo Cruz	12
2002–03	Serie A (1)	34	10	11	13	39	47	41	11th	R16				Giuseppe Signori	16
2003–04	Serie A (1)	34	10	9	15	45	53	39	12th	R16				Claudio Bellucci	9
2004–05	Serie A (1)	38	9	15	14	33	36	42	18th	R16				Claudio Bellucci	10
2005–06	Serie B (2)	42	16	16	10	55	42	64	8th	2R				Claudio Bellucci	25
2006–07	Serie B (2)	42	18	11	13	52	43	65	7th	3R				Claudio Bellucci	19
2007–08	Serie B (2)	42	24	12	6	58	29	84	2nd	2R				Massimo Marazzina	23
2008–09	Serie A (1)	38	9	10	19	43	62	37	17th	R16				Marco Di Vaio	25
2009–10	Serie A (1)	38	10	12	16	42	55	42	17th	3R				Marco Di Vaio	12
2010–11	Serie A (1)	38	11	12	15	35	52	42	16th	3R				Marco Di Vaio	19
2011–12	Serie A (1)	38	13	12	13	41	43	51	9th	R16				Marco Di Vaio	10
2012–13	Serie A (1)	38	11	11	16	46	52	44	13th	QF				Alberto Gilardino	13
2013–14	Serie A (1)	38	5	14	19	28	58	29	19th	4R				Alessandro Diamanti	6
2014–15	Serie B (2)	42	17	17	8	49	35	68	4th	2R				Daniele Cacia	12
2015–16	Serie A (1)	38	11	9	18	33	45	42	14th	3R				Mattia Destro	8
2016–17	Serie A (1)	38	11	8	19	40	58	41	15th	R16				Mattia Destro	11
2017–18	Serie A (1)	38	11	6	21	40	52	39	15th	3R				Simone Verdi	10
2018–19	Serie A (1)	38	11	11	16	48	56	44	10th	R16				Riccardo Orsolini	10
2019–20	Serie A (1)	38	12	11	15	52	65	47	12th	4R				Riccardo Orsolini	9
2020–21	Serie A (1)	38	10	11	17	51	65	41	12th	4R				Musa Barrow Riccardo Orsolini Roberto Soriano	9
2021–22	Serie A (1)	38	12	10	16	44	55	46	13th	1R				Marko Arnautović	15
2022–23	Serie A (1)	38	14	12	12	53	49	54	9th	R16				Riccardo Orsolini	11
2023–24	Serie A (1)	38	18	14	6	54	32	68	5th	QF				Joshua Zirkzee	12
2024–25	Serie A (1)	38	16	14	8	57	47	62	9th	**W**		UCL	LP	Riccardo Orsolini	17
2025–26	Serie A (1)	38	16	8	14	49	46	56	8th	QF	RU	UEL	QF	Riccardo Orsolini	14
