= Tournoi international de l'Exposition Universelle de Paris =

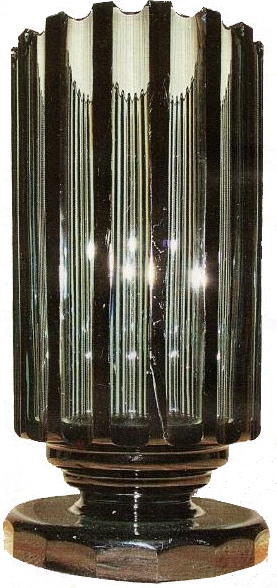
- Founded: 1937
- Abolished: 1937; 89 years ago
- Region: Europe
- Teams: 8
- Last champions: (Italy) Bologna (1937)
- Most championships: (Italy) Bologna (1 title)

The Tournoi international de l'Exposition Universelle de Paris (the international tournament of the Paris exhibition) was an international club football tournament which took place from May to June 1937. It was arranged to coincide with the international exhibition being held in France that year. Eight clubs from around Europe were invited to participate. The tournament was won by Italian champions Bologna, who beat English side Chelsea 4–1 in the final. Bologna's victory marked the first time that an Italian team won an international tournament against an English team.

== Tournament ==
=== Quarter-finals ===
Matches played were played on 30 May respectively in Le Havre, Strasbourg, Antibes and Paris

Team 1	Score	Team 2
Austria Vienna	2–0	(Germany) Leipzig
Slavia Praga (Czechoslovakia)	2–1	(Hungary) Phöbus FC
Chelsea (England)	1–1^{1}	(France) Olympique de Marseille
Bologna (Italy)	4–1	(France) Sochaux

^{1} Chelsea won on coin toss

=== Semi finals ===
Matches were played on 3 June respectively in Paris and Lille

Team 1	Score	Team 2
Chelsea (England)	2–0	Austria Vienna
Bologna (Italy)	2–0	(Czechoslovakia) Slavia Praga

=== Third-place play-off ===
Match played 5 June in Saint-Ouen

Team 1	Score	Team 2
Slavia Praga (Czechoslovakia)	3–0	Austria Vienna

=== Final ===
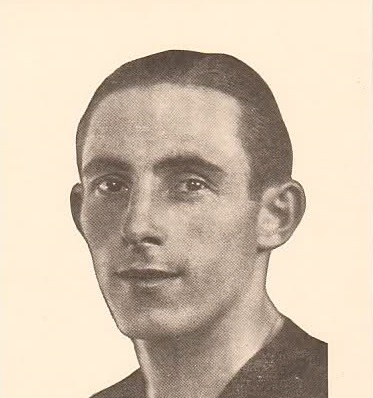
Carlo Reguzzoni scored a hat-trick for Bologna in the final

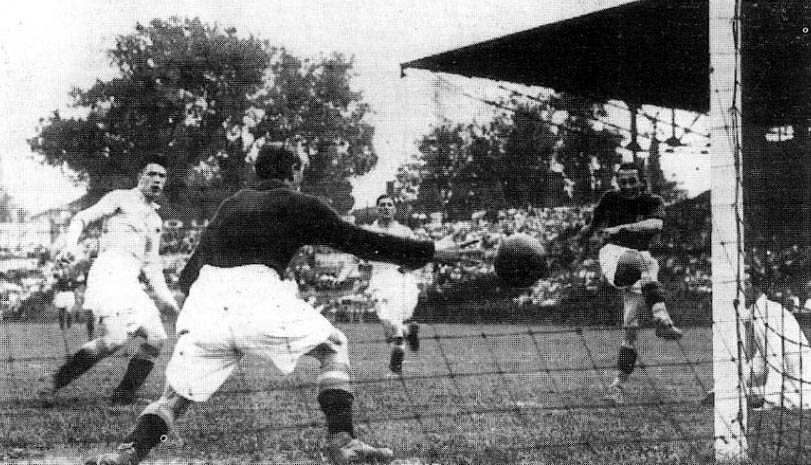
A moment of the match

The final took place on 6 June in front of a crowd at the Saint-Ouen. Bologna imposed themselves physically and with their ferocious desire to win, but they also showed a sense of security that hindered Chelsea. The first ten minutes saw the English side produce some brilliant and inspired moves, easily dribbling past their opponents. However, the Italians managed to organize themselves and took the lead when Carlos Reguzzoni opened the scoring after an error by full-back Ned Barkas. The now more determined Bologna quickly and clearly imposed themselves on the game, and just six minutes later Giovanni Busoni doubled their lead;

Bologna managed to score a third before the break, again via Reguzzoni. In the second half, Bologna relaxed due their three-goal advantage, and the English took advantage of this to take control of the game, but they failed to find a goal because of the great Bologna defence, which included the unbeatable Carlo Ceresoli between the posts, the physical strength and class of Dino Fiorini and the positional sense of Felice Gasperi. Reguzzoni sealed his hat-trick in the 65th minute with a goal against the run of play, and thus gave Bologna a resounding 4–0 lead. Chelsea was able to salvage a small measure of honour with a fine solo move by Sam Weaver. The best Bologna players were Ceresoli, Reguzzoni, Sansone and Andreolo and Fedullo, all of whom were South Americans.

Tournoi International de Paris final
6 June 1937

Bologna (Italy)	4–1	(England) Chelsea
Reguzzoni 15', 31', 65'; Busoni 20'	Report1; Report2	Weaver 72'

Saint-Ouen, Paris
Referee: (France) Lucien Leclercq

Team details

Bologna
Chelsea

GK	Carlo Ceresoli
DF	Dino Fiorini
DF	Felice Gasperi
MF	Mario Montesanto
MF	Michele Andreolo
MF	Giordano Corsi
FW	Giovanni Busoni
FW	Raffaele Sansone
FW	Angelo Schiavio
FW	Francisco Fedullo
FW	Carlo Reguzzoni
Manager:
Árpád Weisz

GK	John Jackson
DF	Ned Barkas
DF	George Barber
MF	Billy Mitchell
MF	Allan Craig
MF	Sam Weaver
FW	Dick Spence
FW	Jimmy Argue
FW	Joe Bambrick
FW	George Gibson
FW	Ernest Reid
Manager:
(Scotland) Leslie Knighton

== See also ==
- Coupe des Nations
- Inter-Cities Fairs Cup
- Exposition Internationale des Arts et Techniques dans la Vie Moderne
