= Derby dell'Appennino =

Italian football derby

- Bologna FC 1909 ACF Fiorentina
- First meeting: Fiorentina 2–3 Bologna; 1928–29 Divisione Nazionale (25 October 1928)
- Latest meeting: Bologna 1–2 Fiorentina; Serie A (18 January 2026)
- Stadiums: Stadio Renato Dall'Ara (Bologna); Stadio Artemio Franchi (Fiorentina)

Statistics
- Total meetings: 152
- Most wins: Fiorentina (60)
- All-time series: Bologna: 43; Drawn: 49; Fiorentina: 60

The Derby dell'Appennino is a derby between Bologna FC 1909 and ACF Fiorentina, two football clubs in Italy. Derby dell'Appennino gets its name from the Appennino Tosco-Emiliano mountains of the Apennine Mountains which geographically separate the two cities.

== Statistics ==
As of match played 18 January 2026

Competition	Played	Bologna wins	Draws	Fiorentina wins	Bologna goals	Fiorentina goals
Serie A	147	41	47	59	153	191
Coppa Italia	5	2	2	1	8	7
Total	152	43	49	60	161	198

== Cup matches ==
Bologna win Draw Fiorentina win

Season	Competition	Date	Home team	Result	Away team
1989–90	Coppa Italia	3 January 1990	Bologna	3–2	Fiorentina
1996–97	Coppa Italia	23 October 1996	Bologna	3–1	Fiorentina
1998–99	Coppa Italia	18 February 1999	Bologna	0–2	Fiorentina
1998–99	Coppa Italia	10 March 1999	Fiorentina	2–2	Bologna
2023–24	Coppa Italia	9 January 2024	Fiorentina	0–0 (Note: Fiorentina won 5–4 on penalties after extra time.)	Bologna

== Head-to-head ranking in Serie A (1930–2025) ==
P.	30	31	32	33	34	35	36	37	38	39	40	41	42	43	46	47	48	49	50	51	52	53	54	55	56	57	58	59	60	61	62	63	64	65	66	67	68	69	70	71	72	73	74	75	76	77	78	79	80	81	82	83	84	85	86	87	88	89	90	91	92	93	94	95	96	97	98	99	00	01	02	03	04	05	06	07	08	09	10	11	12	13	14	15	16	17	18	19	20	21	22	23	24	25
1							1	1		1		1													1								1					1																																																								
2			2								2															2	2	2	2						2																2																																											
3		3		3		3																	3								3					3										3							3															3																										
4			4		4							4									4			4							4	4	4	4	4		4					4																							4												4	4				4	4	4										
5				5					5							5		5	5	5		5		5	5	5			5							5	5		5	5									5	5		5			5												5																		5								5	
6					6	6								6						6			6				6					6		6							6		6																																	6																		6
7	7												7	7			7					7								7												7		7	7			7	7	7								7								7			7		7																				7			
8																	8	8																										8													8		8								8																			8	8					8	8	
9								9					9																	9								9					9		9									9												9		9		9					9					9	9											9		9
10																												10											10																	10								10						10																		10	10					
11																																									11																												11			11							11															
12							12																																							12	12												12	12	12												12																12	12				
13											13																													13							13	13																																	13	13								13	13			
14																																																										14																											14									
15																			15																																15																																			15	15							
16									16												16																																									16												16						16								16						
17																17																																																							17							17	17															
18																																																												18														18																				
19																																																																																			19											
20																																																																																														

• Total: Fiorentina with 44 higher finishes, Bologna with 29 higher finishes (as of the end of the 2024–25 season).

Notes:

- Both teams didn't qualify for the final round of 8 teams in 1946
