= Derby del Sole =

Italian football derby

- Other names: Derby of the Sun, Derby del Sud
- Location: Italy
- Teams: Roma; Napoli
- First meeting: 8 April 1928; Coppa CONI; Roma 4–1 Napoli
- Latest meeting: 24 October 2026; Serie A Napoli 3–3 Roma
- Stadiums: Stadio Olimpico (Roma); Stadio Diego Armando Maradona (Napoli)

Statistics
- Total meetings: Official matches: 182; Unofficial matches: 10; Total matches: 192
- Most wins: Official matches: Roma (66); Unofficial matches: Roma (4); Total matches: Roma (70)
- Top scorer: Dino da Costa (8)
- Largest victory: Roma 8–0 Napoli; 1958–59 Serie A (29 March 1959)

The Derby del Sole (or the Derby of the Sun in English), also known as Derby del Sud, is an Italian football derby between Napoli and Roma. The two clubs are considered the most popular outside of Northern Italy; Roma being from Central Italy and Napoli from Southern Italy.

== Statistics ==
As of 15 February 2026

Competition	Played	Roma wins	Draws	Napoli wins
Serie A	163	54	58	51
Coppa Italia	17	11	2	4
Coppa CONI	2	1	0	1
Total (official)	182	66	60	56
Other meetings	10	4	3	3
Total	192	70	63	59

== Results ==
- SF = Semi-finals
- QF = Quarter-finals
- R16 = Round of 16
- R32 = Round of 32
- GS = Group stage
- R1 = Round 1
- R2 = Round 2

Napoli won Draw Roma won

Season	Competition	Date	Home team	Result	Away team
1928–29	Coppa CONI	8 April 1928	Roma	4–1	Napoli
1928–29	Coppa CONI	24 June 1928	Napoli	2–0	Roma
1929–30	Serie A	10 November 1929	Roma	2–2	Napoli
1929–30	Serie A	13 April 1930	Napoli	1–1	Roma
1930–31	Serie A	19 October 1930	Roma	3–1	Napoli
1930–31	Serie A	8 March 1931	Napoli	3–0	Roma
1931–32	Serie A	29 November 1931	Roma	1–0	Napoli
1931–32	Serie A	24 April 1932	Napoli	1–0	Roma
1932–33	Serie A	18 December 1932	Napoli	1–2	Roma
1932–33	Serie A	25 May 1933	Roma	1–1	Napoli
1933–34	Serie A	19 November 1933	Napoli	1–2	Roma
1933–34	Serie A	8 April 1934	Roma	1–2	Napoli
1934–35	Serie A	7 October 1934	Napoli	3–2	Roma
1934–35	Serie A	3 March 1935	Roma	4–0	Napoli
1935–36	Serie A	6 October 1935	Roma	1–0	Napoli
1935–36	Serie A	9 February 1936	Napoli	1–2	Roma
1936–37	Serie A	13 September 1936	Napoli	0–0	Roma
1936–37	Serie A	17 January 1937	Roma	1–0	Napoli
1936–37	Coppa Italia QF	20 May 1937	Napoli	0–1	Roma
1937–38	Serie A	26 September 1937	Roma	2–1	Napoli
1937–38	Coppa Italia R16	26 December 1937	Napoli	4–2	Roma
1937–38	Serie A	30 January 1938	Napoli	2–2	Roma
1938–39	Serie A	13 November 1938	Roma	2–2	Napoli
1938–39	Serie A	19 March 1939	Napoli	1–0	Roma
1939–40	Serie A	8 October 1939	Napoli	0–1	Roma
1939–40	Serie A	11 February 1940	Roma	1–0	Napoli
1940–41	Serie A	22 December 1940	Napoli	2–1	Roma
1940–41	Serie A	6 April 1941	Roma	2–2	Napoli
1941–42	Serie A	26 October 1941	Roma	5–1	Napoli
1941–42	Serie A	15 February 1942	Napoli	1–1	Roma
1945–46	Serie A-B	16 December 1945	Roma	0–0	Napoli
1945–46	Serie A-B	17 March 1946	Napoli	1–1	Roma
1945–46	Serie A-B	26 May 1946	Napoli	2–1	Roma
1945–46	Serie A-B	14 July 1946	Roma	2–0	Napoli
1946–47	Serie A	19 January 1947	Roma	0–0	Napoli
1946–47	Serie A	22 June 1947	Napoli	0–3	Roma
1947–48	Serie A	21 December 1947	Napoli	1–2	Roma
1947–48	Serie A	9 May 1948	Roma	1–0	Napoli
1950–51	Serie A	19 November 1950	Roma	0–0	Napoli
1950–51	Serie A	1 April 1951	Napoli	0–0	Roma
1952–53	Serie A	4 January 1953	Roma	5–2	Napoli
1952–53	Serie A	10 May 1953	Napoli	0–0	Roma
1953–54	Serie A	27 December 1953	Roma	0–0	Napoli
1953–54	Serie A	9 May 1954	Napoli	1–0	Roma
1954–55	Serie A	24 October 1954	Roma	0–0	Napoli
1954–55	Serie A	13 March 1955	Napoli	2–0	Roma
1955–56	Serie A	23 October 1955	Napoli	1–1	Roma
1955–56	Serie A	18 March 1956	Roma	2–1	Napoli
1956–57	Serie A	30 December 1956	Roma	1–3	Napoli
1956–57	Serie A	13 March 1957	Napoli	1–2	Roma
1957–58	Serie A	17 November 1957	Napoli	0–0	Roma
1957–58	Serie A	13 April 1958	Roma	0–2	Napoli
1957–58	Coppa Italia GS	8 June 1958	Napoli	0–2	Roma
1957–58	Coppa Italia GS	1 July 1958	Roma	2–1	Napoli
1958–59	Serie A	16 November 1958	Napoli	3–0	Roma
1958–59	Serie A	29 March 1959	Roma	8–0	Napoli
1959–60	Serie A	24 January 1960	Roma	3–0	Napoli
1959–60	Serie A	29 May 1960	Napoli	1–0	Roma
1960–61	Coppa Italia R2	18 September 1960	Napoli	1–2	Roma
1960–61	Serie A	23 October 1960	Napoli	3–2	Roma
1960–61	Serie A	5 March 1961	Roma	2–0	Napoli
1961–62	Coppa Italia QF	1 May 1962	Roma	0–1	Napoli
1962–63	Serie A	16 September 1962	Roma	3–0	Napoli
1962–63	Serie A	20 January 1963	Napoli	3–3	Roma
1964–65	Coppa Italia QF	5 May 1965	Napoli	1–2	Roma
1965–66	Serie A	24 October 1965	Roma	0–0	Napoli
1965–66	Serie A	13 March 1966	Napoli	1–0	Roma
1966–67	Serie A	2 October 1966	Roma	0–2	Napoli
1966–67	Serie A	12 February 1967	Napoli	2–0	Roma
1967–68	Serie A	1 October 1967	Roma	2–1	Napoli
1967–68	Serie A	28 January 1968	Napoli	2–0	Roma
1968–69	Serie A	27 October 1968	Napoli	0–0	Roma
1968–69	Serie A	23 February 1969	Roma	0–0	Napoli
1969–70	Serie A	12 October 1969	Napoli	0–0	Roma
1969–70	Serie A	8 February 1970	Roma	2–1	Napoli
1970–71	Serie A	3 January 1971	Roma	2–2	Napoli
1970–71	Serie A	25 April 1971	Napoli	1–2	Roma
1971–72	Serie A	12 December 1971	Napoli	4–0	Roma
1971–72	Serie A	2 April 1972	Roma	1–0	Napoli
1972–73	Serie A	20 October 1972	Roma	1–0	Napoli
1972–73	Serie A	18 February 1973	Napoli	1–0	Roma
1973–74	Serie A	2 December 1973	Roma	0–1	Napoli
1973–74	Serie A	24 March 1974	Napoli	1–1	Roma
1974–75	Serie A	13 October 1974	Roma	0–0	Napoli
1974–75	Serie A	9 February 1975	Napoli	2–0	Roma
1974–75	Coppa Italia R2	29 May 1975	Roma	0–0	Napoli
1974–75	Coppa Italia R2	19 June 1975	Napoli	0–2	Roma
1975–76	Serie A	18 January 1976	Napoli	2–1	Roma
1975–76	Serie A	2 May 1976	Roma	0–3	Napoli
1976–77	Serie A	12 December 1976	Napoli	1–0	Roma
1976–77	Serie A	10 April 1977	Roma	0–0	Napoli
1977–78	Serie A	30 October 1977	Napoli	2–0	Roma
1977–78	Serie A	5 March 1978	Roma	0–0	Napoli
1978–79	Serie A	15 October 1978	Napoli	1–0	Roma
1978–79	Serie A	11 February 1979	Roma	0–0	Napoli
1979–80	Serie A	7 October 1979	Napoli	3–0	Roma
1979–80	Serie A	3 February 1980	Roma	0–0	Napoli
1980–81	Serie A	19 October 1980	Napoli	4–0	Roma
1980–81	Serie A	8 March 1981	Roma	1–1	Napoli
1981–82	Serie A	3 January 1982	Napoli	1–0	Roma
1981–82	Serie A	2 May 1982	Roma	1–1	Napoli
1982–83	Serie A	10 October 1982	Napoli	1–3	Roma
1982–83	Serie A	20 February 1983	Roma	5–2	Napoli
1983–84	Serie A	30 October 1983	Roma	5–1	Napoli
1983–84	Serie A	11 March 1984	Napoli	1–2	Roma
1984–85	Serie A	16 December 1984	Napoli	1–2	Roma
1984–85	Serie A	28 April 1985	Roma	1–1	Napoli

Season	Competition	Date	Home team	Result	Away team
1985–86	Serie A	29 September 1985	Napoli	1–1	Roma
1985–86	Serie A	26 January 1986	Roma	2–0	Napoli
1986–87	Serie A	26 October 1986	Roma	0–1	Napoli
1986–87	Serie A	15 March 1987	Napoli	0–0	Roma
1987–88	Serie A	25 October 1987	Roma	1–1	Napoli
1987–88	Serie A	6 March 1988	Napoli	1–2	Roma
1988–89	Serie A	31 December 1988	Roma	1–0	Napoli
1988–89	Serie A	14 March 1989	Napoli	1–1	Roma
1989–90	Serie A	8 October 1989	Roma	1–1	Napoli
1989–90	Serie A	18 February 1990	Napoli	3–1	Roma
1990–91	Serie A	13 January 1991	Napoli	1–1	Roma
1990–91	Serie A	19 May 1991	Roma	1–1	Napoli
1991–92	Coppa Italia R16	29 September 1991	Roma	1–0	Napoli
1991–92	Serie A	17 November 1991	Roma	1–1	Napoli
1991–92	Coppa Italia R16	4 December 1991	Napoli	3–2	Roma
1991–92	Serie A	5 April 1992	Napoli	3–2	Roma
1992–93	Serie A	25 October 1992	Napoli	2–1	Roma
1992–93	Coppa Italia QF	27 January 1993	Napoli	0–0	Roma
1992–93	Coppa Italia QF	9 February 1993	Roma	2–0	Napoli
1992–93	Serie A	21 March 1993	Roma	1–1	Napoli
1993–94	Serie A	12 September 1993	Roma	2–3	Napoli
1993–94	Serie A	30 January 1994	Napoli	1–1	Roma
1994–95	Serie A	9 November 1994	Roma	1–1	Napoli
1994–95	Serie A	9 April 1995	Napoli	0–0	Roma
1995–96	Serie A	17 December 1995	Napoli	0–2	Roma
1995–96	Serie A	21 April 1996	Roma	4–1	Napoli
1996–97	Serie A	15 December 1996	Roma	1–0	Napoli
1996–97	Serie A	11 May 1997	Napoli	1–0	Roma
1997–98	Serie A	5 October 1997	Roma	6–2	Napoli
1997–98	Serie A	22 February 1998	Napoli	0–2	Roma
2000–01	Serie A	28 January 2001	Roma	3–0	Napoli
2000–01	Serie A	10 June 2001	Napoli	2–2	Roma
2005–06	Coppa Italia R16	8 December 2005	Napoli	0–3	Roma
2005–06	Coppa Italia R16	11 January 2006	Roma	2–1	Napoli
2007–08	Serie A	20 October 2007	Roma	4–4	Napoli
2007–08	Serie A	9 March 2008	Napoli	0–2	Roma
2008–09	Serie A	31 August 2008	Roma	1–1	Napoli
2008–09	Serie A	25 January 2009	Napoli	0–3	Roma
2009–10	Serie A	4 October 2009	Roma	2–1	Napoli
2009–10	Serie A	28 February 2010	Napoli	2–2	Roma
2010–11	Serie A	3 October 2010	Napoli	2–0	Roma
2010–11	Serie A	12 February 2011	Roma	0–2	Napoli
2011–12	Serie A	18 December 2011	Napoli	1–3	Roma
2011–12	Serie A	28 April 2012	Roma	2–2	Napoli
2012–13	Serie A	6 January 2013	Napoli	4–1	Roma
2012–13	Serie A	19 May 2013	Roma	2–1	Napoli
2013–14	Serie A	18 October 2013	Roma	2–0	Napoli
2013–14	Coppa Italia SF	5 February 2014	Roma	3–2	Napoli
2013–14	Coppa Italia SF	12 February 2014	Napoli	3–0	Roma
2013–14	Serie A	9 March 2014	Napoli	1–0	Roma
2014–15	Serie A	1 November 2014	Napoli	2–0	Roma
2014–15	Serie A	4 April 2015	Roma	1–0	Napoli
2015–16	Serie A	13 December 2015	Napoli	0–0	Roma
2015–16	Serie A	25 April 2016	Roma	1–0	Napoli
2016–17	Serie A	15 October 2016	Napoli	1–3	Roma
2016–17	Serie A	4 March 2017	Roma	1–2	Napoli
2017–18	Serie A	14 October 2017	Roma	0–1	Napoli
2017–18	Serie A	3 March 2018	Napoli	2–4	Roma
2018–19	Serie A	28 October 2018	Napoli	1–1	Roma
2018–19	Serie A	31 March 2019	Roma	1–4	Napoli
2019–20	Serie A	2 November 2019	Roma	2–1	Napoli
2019–20	Serie A	5 July 2020	Napoli	2–1	Roma
2020–21	Serie A	29 November 2020	Napoli	4–0	Roma
2020–21	Serie A	21 March 2021	Roma	0–2	Napoli
2021–22	Serie A	24 October 2021	Roma	0–0	Napoli
2021–22	Serie A	18 April 2022	Napoli	1–1	Roma
2022–23	Serie A	23 October 2022	Roma	0–1	Napoli
2022–23	Serie A	29 January 2023	Napoli	2–1	Roma
2023–24	Serie A	23 December 2023	Roma	2–0	Napoli
2023–24	Serie A	28 April 2024	Napoli	2–2	Roma
2024–25	Serie A	24 November 2024	Napoli	1–0	Roma
2024–25	Serie A	2 February 2025	Roma	1–1	Napoli
2025–26	Serie A	30 November 2025	Roma	0–1	Napoli
2025–26	Serie A	15 February 2026	Napoli	2–2	Roma
2026–27	Serie A	24 October 2026	Napoli	3–3	Roma

== Head-to-head ranking in Serie A (1930–2026) ==
P.	30	31	32	33	34	35	36	37	38	39	40	41	42	43	47	48	49	50	51	52	53	54	55	56	57	58	59	60	61	62	63	64	65	66	67	68	69	70	71	72	73	74	75	76	77	78	79	80	81	82	83	84	85	86	87	88	89	90	91	92	93	94	95	96	97	98	99	00	01	02	03	04	05	06	07	08	09	10	11	12	13	14	15	16	17	18	19	20	21	22	23	24	25	26
1													1																																						1				1			1											1																						1		1	
2		2					2																													2							2						2			2		2		2	2													2		2		2	2	2		2			2	2	2	2	2	2	2							2
3			3	3	3																		3											3					3			3	3						3	3				3		3																							3			3		3	3	3				3				3
4						4															4					4									4															4										4						4																												
5	5			5	5					5												5				5			5	5	5													5																5			5	5			5													5			5					5	5				5	
6	6	6							6										6	6	6	6	6	6			6											6	6							6	6	6										6				6						6									6	6	6		6						6			6	6	6		
7						7				7	7																7										7			7					7								7		7							7	7																	7								7	7					
8							8					8			8																			8			8			8		8			8	8							8				8		8												8		8			8																		
9			9											9														9					9								9																		9																																			
10								10	10																										10	10								10				10			10										10																															10		
11												11													11													11			11											11									11																																	
12																																12															12																	12	12												12																	
13								13																				13																																					13																													
14											14						14							14	14																																																																					
15													15		15																																																																															
16																															16																																																															
17																17		17											17																																								17																									
18																18																																																		18																												
19																			19																																																																											
20																																																																																														

• Total: Napoli with 41 higher finishes, Roma with 38 higher finishes (only including seasons in which both teams played in Serie A, as of the end of the 2025–26 season).

== Trophies ==
As of 22 December 2025

Team	Major domestic				International										Grand total
Team	SA	CI	SCI	National total	CL	CWC	ICFC	EL	ECL	USC	UIC	IC	FCWC	International total	Grand total
Roma	3	9	2	14	—	—	1	—	1	—	—	—	—	2	16
Napoli	4	6	3	13	—	—	—	1	—	—	—	—	—	1	14

Note: Roma won the Inter-Cities Fairs Cup once, but it does not count towards their official European record.
