= Mario Pagotto =

Italian footballer (1911–1992)

Personal information
- Full name: Mario Pagotto
- Date of birth: 14 December 1911
- Place of birth: Fontanafredda, Italy
- Date of death: August 1992 (aged 80)
- Place of death: Bologna, Italy
- Position: Defender

Senior career*
Years	Team	Apps	(Gls)
1933–1936	Pordenone	?	(?)
1936–1943	Bologna	184	(0)
1945–1946	Bologna	23	(0)
1946–1948	Bologna	5	(0)
1948–1949	Vignolese	?	(?)

International career
1940	Italy	1	(0)
- * Club domestic league appearances and goals

Mario Pagotto (Italian pronunciation: [ˈmaːrjo paˈɡɔtto]; 14 December 1911 – August 1992) was an Italian footballer who played as a defender. On 14 April 1940, he represented the Italy national football team on the occasion of a friendly match against Romania in a 2–1 home win.

== Honours ==
=== Player ===
Bologna

- Serie A: 1936–37, 1938–39, 1940–41
