= Mario Montesanto =

Italian footballer (1909–1987)

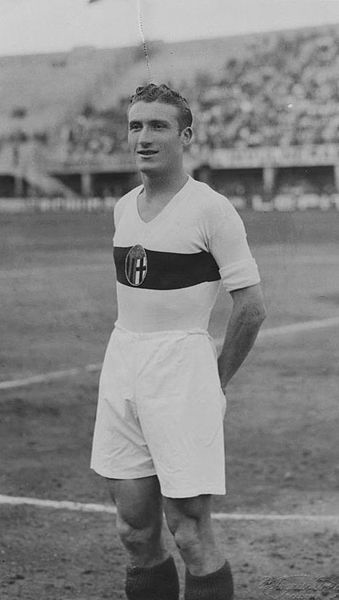
- Montesanto in 1932

Personal information
- Date of birth: 11 August 1909
- Place of birth: Venice, Italy
- Date of death: 29 March 1987 (aged 77)
- Place of death: Castel San Pietro Terme, Italy
- Position: Midfielder

Senior career*
| Years | Team | Apps | (Gls) |
| 1928–1930 | Venezia | 50 | (5) |
| 1930–1942 | Bologna | 277 | (9) |
| 1945–1946 | Persicetana | ? | (?) |

International career
| 1935–1936 | Italy | 2 | (0) |

Managerial career
- 1942–1943: Bologna
- * Club domestic league appearances and goals

Mario Montesanto (Italian pronunciation: [ˈmaːrjo monteˈsanto]; 11 August 1909 – 29 March 1987) was an Italian football manager and player who played as a midfielder.

He is best known for his long and successful career with Bologna.

== Club career ==
Montesanto began his football journey with Venezia, but in 1930, at a young age, he transferred to Bologna. He spent twelve seasons at the club, making 280 appearances and scoring 10 goals.

== International career ==
He represented the Italy national team twice, the first being on 17 February 1935 in a 2–1 home win in a friendly match against France.

== Honours ==
=== Player ===
Bologna

- Serie A: 1935–36, 1936–37, 1938–39, 1940–41
- Mitropa Cup: 1932, 1934
- Tournoi international de l'Exposition Universelle de Paris
