= Secondo Ricci =

Italian footballer

Personal information
- Full name: Secondo Ricci
- Date of birth: 8 October 1913
- Place of birth: Bagnacavallo, Italy
- Date of death: 13 January 1984 (aged 70)
- Place of death: Bagnacavallo, Italy
- Position: Defender

Senior career*
Years	Team	Apps	(Gls)
1932–1936	Russi	4	(1)
1936–1937	Ravenna	21	(0)
1937–1938	Russi	?	(?)
1938–1950	Bologna	183	(0)
1950–1952	Ravenna	57	(0)

International career
1940	Italy	1	(0)
- * Club domestic league appearances and goals

Secondo Ricci (Italian pronunciation: [seˈkondo ˈrittʃi]; 8 October 1913 – 13 January 1984) was an Italian footballer who played as a defender. On 14 April 1940, he represented the Italy national football team on the occasion of a friendly match against Romania in a 2–1 home win.

== Honours ==
=== Player ===
Bologna

- Serie A: 1938–39, 1938–39 Serie A
