= Walter Petron =

Italian footballer

Personal information
- Date of birth: 25 August 1918
- Place of birth: Padua, Italy
- Date of death: 21 March 1945 (aged 26)
- Place of death: Padua, Italy
- Position: Forward

Senior career*
Years	Team	Apps	(Gls)
1938–1942	Torino	107	(26)
1942–1943	Venezia	26	(4)
Total		133	(30)
- * Club domestic league appearances and goals

Walter Petron (25 August 1918 – 21 March 1945) was an Italian professional footballer who played as a forward in Serie A for Torino and Venezia.

Petron was killed in a bombing raid during the Second World War. A stadium in his hometown of Padua was named after him.
