= Giovanni Costa (footballer) =

Italian footballer

Personal information
- Full name: Giovanni Costa
- Date of birth: 1901
- Place of birth: La Spezia, Italy
- Date of death: 1968 (aged 66–67)
- Position: Goalkeeper

Senior career*
| Years | Team | Apps | (Gls) |
| 1919–1922 | Spezia | 33 | (0) |
| 1922–1923 | Entella | ? | (0) |
| 1923–1924 | Sestrese | 19 | (0) |
| 1924–1925 | Esperia | ? | (0) |
| 1925–1928 | Biellese | 24 | (0) |
| 1928–1929 | Pistoiese | 24 | (0) |
| 1929–1931 | Spezia | 10 | (0) |

International career
| 1924 | Italy | 1 | (0) |
- * Club domestic league appearances and goals

Giovanni Costa (Italian pronunciation: [dʒoˈvanni ˈkɔsta]; 1901 – 1968) was an Italian footballer who played as a goalkeeper. On 20 January 1924, he represented the Italy national football team on the occasion of a friendly match against Austria in a 4–0 away loss.
