= Michele Andreolo =

Italian footballer (1912-1981)

Miguel Andreolo
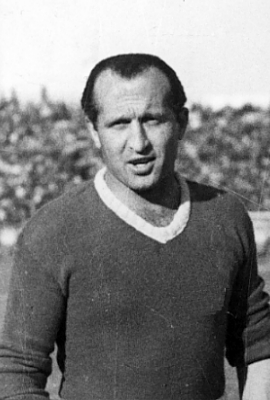
- Andreolo in 1945

Personal information
- Full name: Miguel Ángel Andreolo Frodella
- Date of birth: 6 September 1912
- Place of birth: Dolores, Uruguay
- Date of death: 14 May 1981 (aged 68)
- Place of death: Potenza, Italy
- Position: Midfielder

Youth career
- Nacional

Senior career*
Years	Team	Apps	(Gls)
1932–1935	Nacional	35	(0)
1935–1943	Bologna	165	(24)
1943–1944	Lazio	14	(1)
1945–1948	Napoli	93	(11)
1948–1949	Catania	–	
1949–1950	Forlì	–	

International career
1935	Uruguay	0	(0)
1936–1942	Italy	26	(1)
Medal record
Representing Uruguay and Italy
South American Football Championship
Gold medal – first place	1935 South American Championship
FIFA World Cup
Gold medal – first place	1938 France
- * Club domestic league appearances and goals as of March 2008

Miguel Ángel Andreolo Frodella (6 September 1912 – 14 May 1981), known as Michele Andreolo (Italian: [miˈkɛːle andreˈɔːlo]), was a Uruguayan Italian footballer who played as a midfielder. He was born in Dolores, Uruguay but his family was from Valle dell'Angelo in the province of Salerno. He was a member of the Italy team that won the 1938 FIFA World Cup.

== Club career ==
Andreolo played for Nacional in Uruguay before joining Serie A team Bologna F.C. 1909 ahead of the 1935–36 season and helping them win the league title (Scudetto) that year. He would remain in Bologna until 1943, winning the Scudetto three more times, in 1936–37, 1938–39 and 1940–41.

Later in his career he played for Italian sides Lazio, Napoli, Catania and Forlì.

== International career ==
Following his success with Bologna, Andreolo was also called up to the Italy national team by Vittorio Pozzo and debuted on 17 May 1936 against Austria. He soon became a regular in the team, playing his crucial role of connection between defence and attack. He helped win the 1938 FIFA World Cup in France, and played his last match for the national team on 19 April 1942, having earned 26 caps and 1 goal. With Uruguay, he won the 1935 South American Championship.

== Death ==
Andreolo died in Potenza, southern Italy.

== Honours ==
=== Club ===
Bologna

- Serie A: 1935–36, 1936–37, 1938–39, 1940–41

=== International ===
Uruguay

- Copa América: 1935

Italy

- FIFA World Cup: 1938

=== Individual ===
- FIFA World Cup All-Star Team: 1938
