= Lodovico De Filippis =

Italian footballer

Personal information
- Date of birth: 22 December 1915
- Place of birth: Ancona, Italy
- Height: 1.70 m (5 ft 7 in)
- Position: Midfielder

Senior career*
Years	Team	Apps	(Gls)
1932–1936	Fano	96	(28)
1936–1937	Bologna	4	(1)
1937–1939	Juventus	52	(7)
1939–1940	Venezia	25	(5)
1940–1943	Triestina	71	(14)
1945–1948	Brescia	90	(23)
1948–1949	Pro Sesto	28	(8)
1949–1952	Palazzolo		
- * Club domestic league appearances and goals

Lodovico De Filippis (born 22 December 1915 in Ancona, died 12 March 1985 in Palazzolo sull’Oglio) was an Italian professional footballer. He mainly played as a right-wing half / lateral midfielder.

Over the course of his career (1932–1952), he appeared in eight Serie A seasons with the clubs Bologna, Juventus, Venezia, Triestina, and Brescia, totaling 187 top-flight matches and scoring 33 goals.

He won the Serie A title with Bologna in 1936-37 and the Coppa Italia with Juventus in 1937-38.
