= Giordano Corsi =

Italian footballer and manager

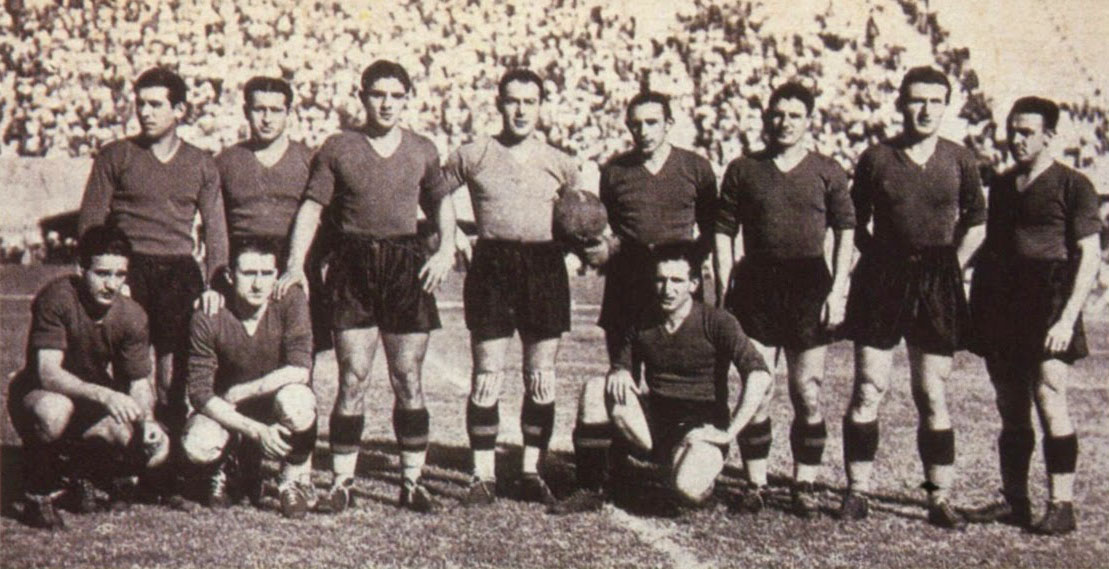

Personal information
- Date of birth: 9 January 1908
- Place of birth: Gonzaga, Italy
- Date of death: 29 July 1958 (aged 50)
- Position: Defensive midfielder

Senior career*
Years	Team	Apps	(Gls)
1929–1932	Verona	72	(0)
1932–1933	Padova	34	(2)
1933–1941	Bologna	197	(7)
1941–1943	Vis Pesaro		

International career
1935–1937	Italy	6	(0)

Managerial career
- 1941–1943: Vis Pesaro
- 1946–1950: Vis Pesaro
- 1957–1958: Vis Pesaro
Medal record
Men's Football
Italy
Central European International Cup
Gold medal – first place	1933–35 Europe
- * Club domestic league appearances and goals

Giordano Corsi (Italian pronunciation: [dʒorˈdaːno ˈkorsi]; 9 January 1908 – 29 July 1958) was an Italian professional footballer and manager who played as a defensive midfielder.

He won four scudetto with Bologna. Corna also played six times with the Italy national football team, where he was part of the squad that won the 1933–35 Central European International Cup.

He was manager of Vis Pesaro in three different spells (1941–1943, 1946–50, 1957–1958).

== Honours ==
=== Club ===
Bologna

- Serie A: 1935–36, 1936–37, 1938–39, 1940–41
- Mitropa Cup: 1934

=== International ===
Italy

- Central European International Cup: 1933–35
