= 1936–37 Coppa Italia =

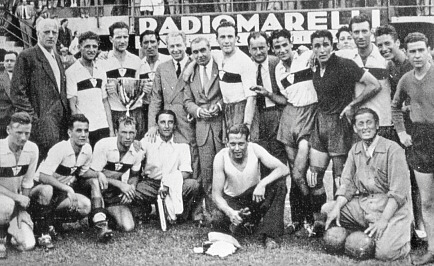
- The Rossoblu with their Coppa Italia

Tournament details
- Country: Italy
- Dates: 25 Oct 1936 – 6 June 1937
- Teams: 108

Final positions
- Champions: Genova 1893 (1st title)
- Runners-up: Roma

Tournament statistics
- Matches played: 121
- Goals scored: 431 (3.56 per match)
- Top goal scorer: Aldo Boffi (7 goals)

The 1936–37 Coppa Italia was the fourth edition of the national cup in Italian football and the second edition of the tournament under the organization of the Direttorio Divisioni Superiori.

All teams from Serie A, Serie B and Serie C took part in this competition, which included a first phase, with elimination rounds reserved for teams in Serie B and C, and a final phase, where the 16 winners of the first phase met the 16 Serie A teams. All the matches were played in a single leg with eventual replay on the model of the FA Cup; homefields were decided by a draw except for the final match in Florence.

The trophy was won by Genova 1893, which defeated 1–0 Roma in the final match, played at the Giovanni Berta Stadium in Florence on June 6, 1937. By winning the cup, Genova 1893 also qualified for the 1937 edition of the Mitropa Cup.

== Qualifying round ==
Serie C qualifying and preliminary rounds were under geographical zones.

Home team	Score	Away team
Anconitana-Bianchi	5-2	Libertas Rimini
Asti	3-1	Acqui
Corniglianese	0-1	Sestrese
Entella	2-1	Adrea Adoria
Foggia	2-0	Benevento
Forlì	2-1	Forlimpopoli
Parma	2-1	Monza
SPAL	4-1	Carpi
Reggiana	2-1	Varese
Taranto	1-2	Lecce
Udinese	4-3	Vicenza
Vigevano	2-1	Legnano

== 1st Preliminary Round ==
52 clubs are added.

Home team	Score	Away team
Anconitana-Bianchi	4-3	Pontedera
Carrarese	1-1 (aet)	Derthona
Civitavecchiese	1-1 (aet)	Molfetta
Entella	1-0	Rivarolese
Fanfulla	5-1	Falck
Fiumana	2-0	Udinese
Foggia	4-0	Bagnolese
Fortitudo Trieste	1-2	Pro Gorizia
Jesi	6-3	Piombino
Lecce	2-1	Salernitana
Macerata	4-3 (aet)	Alma Juventus Fano
Manfredonia	0-2	Potenza
Mantova	4-0	Ponziana
MATER	0-0 (aet)	Cerignola
Padova	2-0	Grion Pola
Parma	4-3	Biellese
Piacenza	5-1	Gallaratese
Pistoiese	0-0 (aet)	Forlì
Pontedemico	2-1	Imperia
Ravenna	5-2 (aet)	Baracca Lugo
Reggiana	4-2	Lecco
Sanremese	4-0	Asti
Savona	2-1 (aet)	Pinerolo
Seregno	3-1	Crema
Sestrese	2-1	Vado
SIAI Marchetti	2-0	Pro Patria
Siena	3-0	Prato
Signe	2-1	Grosseto
SPAL	3-4 (aet)	Rovigo
Taranto	1-2	Cosenza
Treviso	1-2	Marzotto Valdagno
Vigevano	4-0	Cusiana

Replay matches

Home team	Score	Away team
Derthona	2-0	Carrarese
Molfetta	4-0	Civitavecchiese
Cerignola	1-1 *	MATER
Forlì	0-0 *	Pistoiese

* Cerignola and Pistoiese qualify after drawing of lots.

== 2nd Preliminary Round ==
Home team	Score	Away team
Entella	9-0	Derthona
Fiumana	3-0	Rovigo
Pro Gorizia	2-1	Marzotto Valdagno
Lecce	0-0 (aet)	Cerignola
Macerata	1-2 (aet)	Anconitana-Bianchi
Molfetta	5-2	Foggia
Padova	3-3 (aet)	Mantova
Parma	3-0	Ravenna
Piacenza	4-0	SIAI Marchetti
Potenza	4-0	Cosenza
Reggiana	3-1	Seregno
Savona	0-0 (aet)	Sanremese
Sestrese	2-1	Pontedemico
Siena	2-5	Jesi
Signe	1-3	Pistoiese
Vigevano	0-1	Fanfulla

Replay matches

Home team	Score	Away team
Cerignola	2-0	Lecce
Mantova	0-0 *	Padova
Sanremese	3-1	Savona

* Mantova qualify after drawing of lots.

== 3rd Preliminary Round ==
All 16 Serie B clubs are added (Catanzarese, Catania, Hellas Verona, Livorno, Atalanta, Brescia, L'Aquila, Viareggio, Pisa, Messina, Pro Vercelli, Spezia, Cremonese, Palermo, Venezia, Modena).

Home team	Score	Away team
Anconitana-Bianchi	4-1	Catanzarese
Catania	1-0	Cerignola
Hellas Verona	3-1	Pro Gorizia
Jesi	2-2 (aet)	Fanfulla
Livorno	4-0	Atalanta
Mantova	0-1	Fiumana
Molfetta	2-2 (aet)	Brescia
Parma	0-1	L'Aquila
Piacenza	3-1	Viareggio
Pisa	6-2	Entella
Reggiana	4-2	Messina
Sanremese	3-0	Pro Vercelli
Sestrese	2-0	Pistoiese
Spezia	2-2 (aet)	Cremonese
Palermo	1-0	Potenza
Venezia	4-2	Modena

Replay matches

Home team	Score	Away team
Fanfulla	3-0	Jesi
Brescia	2-0	Molfetta
Cremonese	2-2 (aet) *	Spezia

* Spezia qualify after drawing of lots.

== Knockout stage ==
All 16 Serie A clubs are added (Bari, Milano, Alessandria, Genova 1893, Lazio, Sampierdarenese, Bologna, Fiorentina, Ambrosiana-Inter, Napoli, Lucchese, Juventus, Roma, Triestina, Torino, Novara).

Round of 32
Livorno	6
Piacenza	2
Fiumana	2
Bari	3
Milano	4
Alessandria	0
Pisa	0
Venezia	2
Genova 1893	5
Lazio	0
Reggiana	2
Palermo	3
Sampierdarenese	1
Bologna	0
Catania (aet)	3
Fiorentina	1
Sanremese	2
Hellas Verona	0
Ambrosiana–Inter	4
L'Aquila	3
Anconitana-Bianchi	1
Fanfulla (replay: 0–2)	1
Spezia	1
Brescia	0
Napoli	5
Sestrese	2
Lucchese	0
Juventus	1
Roma	2
Triestina	1
Torino	3
Novara	0

Round of 16
Livorno	1
Bari	2
Milano	2
Venezia	0
Genova 1893	4
Palermo	0
Sampierdarenese	3
Catania	4
Sanremese	1
Ambrosiana–Inter	3
Fanfulla	0
Spezia (replay: 1–3)	0
Napoli	2
Juventus	1
Roma	3
Torino	1

Quarterfinals
Bari	2
Milano (replay: 1–3)	2
Genova 1893	4
Catania	0
Ambrosiana–Inter	7
Spezia	1
Napoli	0
Roma	1

Semifinals
Milano	1
Genova 1893 (replay: 1–2 aet)	1
Ambrosiana–Inter	0
Roma	2

Final
Genova 1893	1
Roma	0

Legend:

- 1936–37 Serie A teams
- 1936–37 Serie B teams
- 1936–37 Serie C teams

== Final ==
6 June 1937

Genova 1893	1–0	Roma
Torti 79'

Stadio Comunale Giovanni Berta, Florence
Referee: Francesco Mattea

== Top goalscorers ==
Rank	Player	Club	Goals
1	(Italy) Aldo Boffi	Milano	7
2	(Italy) Orfeo Pagliari	Jesi	5
2	(Italy) Alessandro Fornasaris	Reggiana	5
2	(Italy) Giuseppe Calò	Molfetta	5
2	(Italy) Fiore Co	Entella	5

== Sources ==
- Almanacco Illustrato del Calcio–La Storia 1898–2004, Panini Edizioni, Modena, September 2005
