= Oliviero Mascheroni =

Italian footballer

Personal information
- Date of birth: 11 June 1914
- Place of birth: Milan, Kingdom of Italy
- Date of death: 27 November 1987
- Place of death: Galliate, Italy
- Height: 1.81 m (5 ft 11 1/2 in)
- Position: Midfielder

Senior career*
| Years | Team | Apps | (Gls) |
| 1932–1934 | Mottese | | |
| 1933–1934 | Milan (B team) | | |
| 1934–1936 | Milan | 6 | (0) |
| 1936–1937 | Sampierdanese | 27 | (5) |
| 1937–1939 | Roma | 36 | (9) |
| 1939–1940 | Novara | 14 | (0) |
| 1940–1941 | Torino | 28 | (9) |
| 1941–1943 | Ambrosiana-Inter | 13 | (3) |
| 1943–1944 | Pro Patria | 10 | (1) |
- * Club domestic league appearances and goals

Oliviero Mascheroni (11 June 1914 – 27 November 1987) was an Italian professional football player.

His sons, Norberto Mascheroni and Riccardo Mascheroni, played football professionally (Riccardo played in the Serie A for Varese and Napoli in the 1970s).
