= Glauco Vanz =

Italian footballer (1920–1986)

Personal information
- Date of birth: 4 March 1920
- Place of birth: Mantua, Kingdom of Italy
- Date of death: 28 September 1986 (aged 66)
- Position: Goalkeeper

Glauco Vanz (4 March 1920 – 28 September 1986) was an Italian footballer. He played in more than 180 matches for Bologna between 1938 and 1952. He was also part of Italy's squad for the football tournament at the 1948 Summer Olympics, but he did not play in any matches.
