= Remo Galli =

Italian footballer and coach

Personal information
- Date of birth: 3 July 1912
- Place of birth: Montecatini Terme, Italy
- Date of death: 12 June 1993 (aged 80)
- Height: 1.70 m (5 ft 7 in)
- Position: Striker

Senior career*
Years	Team	Apps	(Gls)
1930–1931	Montecatini	25	(11)
1931–1933	Prato	51	(44)
1933–1934	Modena	31	(33)
1934–1935	Ambrosiana-Inter	2	(1)
1935–1937	Torino	45	(16)
1937–1939	Lucchese	5	(0)
1939	Modena	1	(0)
1939–1941	Alfa Romeo Milano		
1941–1942	Prato	3	(0)
1942–1943	Scafatese	23	(10)
1943–1944	Montecatini	6	(2)
1945–1946	Nocerina		

Managerial career
- 1951–1952: Palermo
- * Club domestic league appearances and goals

Remo Galli (3 July 1912 – 12 June 1993) was an Italian professional football player and coach. He was born in Montecatini Terme.

== Honours ==
- Coppa Italia winner: 1935/36.
