= 1937 Mitropa Cup =

Tournament details
- Dates: 13 June – 24 October 1937
- Teams: 16

Final positions
- Champions: (Hungary) Ferencváros (2nd title)
- Runners-up: (Italy) Lazio

Tournament statistics
- Matches played: 30
- Top scorer: (Hungary) György Sárosi (12 goals)

The 1937 season of the Mitropa Cup football club tournament was won by Ferencváros who defeated Lazio 9–6 on aggregate in the final. It was their second victory in the competition, having previously won it in 1928. The two legs of the final were played on 12 September and 24 October.

This was the eleventh edition of the tournament, and the first edition to feature a team from Romania. Defending champions Austria Wien lost at the semifinal stage to eventual winners Ferencváros.

== First round ==
Team 1	Agg.	Team 2	1st leg	2nd leg
Slavia Prague (Czechoslovakia)	3–5	(Hungary) Ferencváros	2–2	1–3
First Vienna (Austria)	2–2^{a}	(Switzerland) Young Fellows Zurich	2–1	0–1
AGC Bologna (Italy)	2–7	Austria Wien	1–2	1–5
Venus București (Romania)	5–10	(Hungary) Újpest	4–6	1–4
Admira Wien (Austria)	3–3^{a}	(Czechoslovakia) Sparta Prague	1–1	2–2
Genoa (Italy)	6–1	(Kingdom of Yugoslavia) Građanski	3–1	3–0
Hungária MTK (Hungary)	3–4	(Italy) Lazio	1–1	2–3
Grasshoppers (Switzerland)	6–5	(Czechoslovakia) Prostějov	4–3	2–2

- ^{a} Match decided by playoff.

=== First round playoffs ===
Team 1	Score	Team 2
First Vienna (Austria)	2–0	(Switzerland) FC Young Fellows Zurich
Admira Wien (Austria)	2–0	(Czechoslovakia) Sparta Prague

== Quarterfinals ==
Team 1	Agg.	Team 2	1st leg	2nd leg
Ferencváros (Hungary)	2–2^{a}	(Austria) First Vienna	2–1	0–1
Austria Wien	7–5	(Hungary) Újpest	5–4	2–1
Lazio (Italy)	8–4	(Switzerland) Grasshoppers	6–1	2–3
Admira Wien (Austria)	^{b}	(Italy) Genoa	2–2	–

- ^{a} Match decided by playoff.
- ^{b} The second leg was not played; both teams were subsequently disqualified from the competition.

=== Quarterfinal playoff ===
Team 1	Score	Team 2
Ferencváros (Hungary)	2–1	(Austria) First Vienna

== Semifinals ==
Team 1	Agg.	Team 2	1st leg	2nd leg
Austria Wien	5–7	(Hungary) Ferencváros	4–1	1–6

(Italy) Lazio

== Finals ==
Team 1	Agg.	Team 2	1st leg	2nd leg
Ferencváros (Hungary)	9–6	(Italy) Lazio	4–2	5–4

12 September 1937

Ferencváros (Hungary)	4–2	(Italy) Lazio
Toldi 22'; Sárosi 53', 59' (pen.), 73'		Busani 26'; Piola 64'

Üllői úti, Budapest
Attendance: 34,000
Referee: Gustav Krist (Czechoslovakia)

24 October 1937

Lazio (Italy)	4–5	(Hungary) Ferencváros
Costa 4'; Piola 19', 24', 36'		Sárosi 6' (pen.), 8', 80'; Toldi 37'; Kiss 71'

Nazionale del PNF, Rome
Attendance: 35,000
Referee: Hans Wüthrich (Switzerland)

1937 Mitropa Cup Champions

Ferencváros
2nd Title

== Top goalscorers ==
Rank	Player	Team	Goals
1	(Hungary) György Sárosi	(Hungary) Ferencváros	12
2	(Italy) Silvio Piola	(Italy) Lazio	10
3	(Hungary) Géza Toldi	(Hungary) Ferencváros	9
