= Dante Di Benedetti =

Italian footballer (born 1916)

Personal information
- Date of birth: October 28, 1916
- Place of birth: Genzano di Roma, Italy
- Height: 1.72 m (5 ft 7 1/2 in)
- Position: Striker

Senior career*
Years	Team	Apps	(Gls)
1933–1937	Roma	31	(13)
1934–1935	→ Rhodense (loan)		
1937–1939	Fiorentina	31	(13)
1939–1940	Lucchese	34	(21)
1940–1941	Fiorentina	28	(12)
1941–1942	Pisa	24	(13)
1942–1943	Bari	26	(6)
1943–1944	Avia Roma	5	(1)
1945–1946	Bari	28	(14)
1946–1948	Napoli	47	(20)
1948–1949	Bari	2	(0)
1949–1950	Jesi	21	(6)
- * Club domestic league appearances and goals

Dante Di Benedetti (born October 28, 1916) is a former Italian professional football player.

He played for 8 seasons (143 games, 52 goals) in the Serie A for A.S. Roma, ACF Fiorentina, A.S. Bari and S.S.C. Napoli.

He was among the top 10 scorers of the 1940/41 Serie A season.
