= Elpidio Coppa =

Italian footballer (1914-1978)

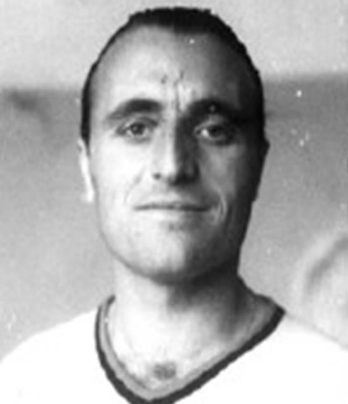

Personal information
- Date of birth: 6 October 1914
- Place of birth: Milan, Kingdom of Italy
- Date of death: 31 August 1978 (aged 63)
- Place of death: Lucca, Italy
- Height: 1.63 m (5 ft 4 in)
- Position: Midfielder

Senior career*
Years	Team	Apps	(Gls)
1932–1934	Ambrosiana-Inter	1	(0)
1934–1935	Pro Patria	29	(6)
1935–1938	Lucchese	89	(30)
1938–1939	Milano	11	(2)
1939–1941	Lucchese	60	(21)
1941–1942	Liguria	12	(3)
1942–1943	Fanfulla	23	(5)
1943–1944	Montecatini	5	(2)
1945–1946	Ausonia Spezia	15	(4)
1946–1948	Lucchese	47	(9)
1948	Casale	0	(0)
1949–1950	Stade Rennais	5	(0)
- * Club domestic league appearances and goals

Elpidio Coppa (6 October 1914 — 31 August 1978) was an Italian professional football player.
