= Gino Cappello =

Italian footballer

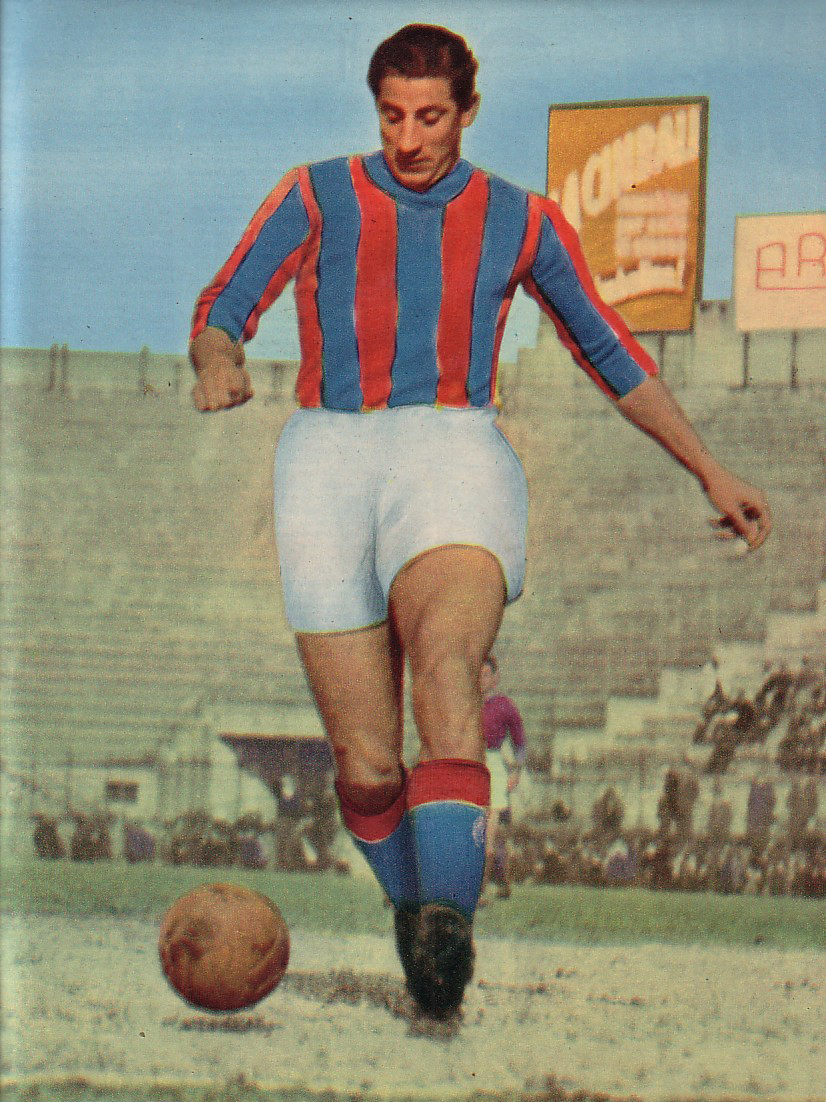
- Cappello playing for Bologna, c. 1951.

Personal information
- Full name: Gino Cappello IV
- Date of birth: 2 June 1920
- Place of birth: Padua, Kingdom of Italy
- Date of death: 28 March 1990 (aged 69)
- Height: 1.80 m (5 ft 11 in)
- Position: Forward

Senior career*
Years	Team	Apps	(Gls)
1939–1940	Padova	60	(39)
1940–1943	Milan	74	(29)
1944	Padova	10	(6)
1945–1956	Bologna	245	(80)
1956–1958	Novara	22	(5)
Total		411	(159)

International career
1949–1954	Italy	11	(3)
1950	Italy B	1	(2)
- * Club domestic league appearances and goals

Gino Cappello (Italian pronunciation: [ˈdʒiːno kapˈpɛllo]; 2 June 1920 – 28 March 1990) was a former Italian footballer, who played primarily as a striker.

== Club career ==
Gino Cappello was born in Padua, Italy on 2 June 1920. He began his career with Calcio Padova in the late 1930s, playing for both, the under-19 and first team at the club.

In 1940, after two seasons with Calcio Padova, he signed for AC Milan in Serie A. Cappello became the second leading goalscorer at the time, despite the club not being a title contender. In January 1944 he moved back to Calcio Padova.

After the end of World War II, Cappello moved to Bologna, where he played for ten seasons, scoring 80 goals in 245 matches.

In his last two seasons, he played for Novara in Serie B. He retired in 1958 at the age of thirty-eight.

== International career ==
Cappello debuted for the Italian national team on 22 May 1949 in a 3–1 win against Austria. A year later, at the 1950 World Cup, he was one of four Italian players to play both games. Four years later, he was selected to play again in the 1954 World Cup where he became the first Italian player to wear the number 10 shirt at a World Cup. He played his last game for Italy in a 4–1 win against Belgium during the tournament.

== Style of play ==
Cappello was known for his body feints, close control, and exceptional dribbling ability that was outstanding for the time period. However, he was also known for poor work rate and inconsistency, often practicing misconduct off the field. Initially deployed as an advanced playmaker or second striker, he became proficient playing anywhere along the front line, on either wing or in the center. Cappello later adapted to the center-forward role.
