= Pietro Ferrari (footballer, born 1914) =

Italian footballer

Personal information
- Full name: Pietro Ferrari
- Date of birth: 24 August 1914
- Place of birth: Reggio Emilia, Italy
- Date of death: 1982 (aged 67–68)
- Position: Goalkeeper

Senior career*
Years	Team	Apps	(Gls)
1933–1936	Reggio Audace	32	(0)
1936–1947	Bologna	146	(0)
1947–1948	Reggio Audace	10	(0)

International career
1940	Italy	1	(0)
- * Club domestic league appearances and goals

Pietro Ferrari (Italian pronunciation: [ˈpjɛːtro ferˈraːri]; 24 August 1914 – 1982) was an Italian footballer who played as a goalkeeper. On 12 January 1940, he represented the Italy national football team on the occasion of a friendly match against Austria in a 1–1 home draw.
