= Ettore Puricelli =

Uruguayan footballer and manager (1916-2001)

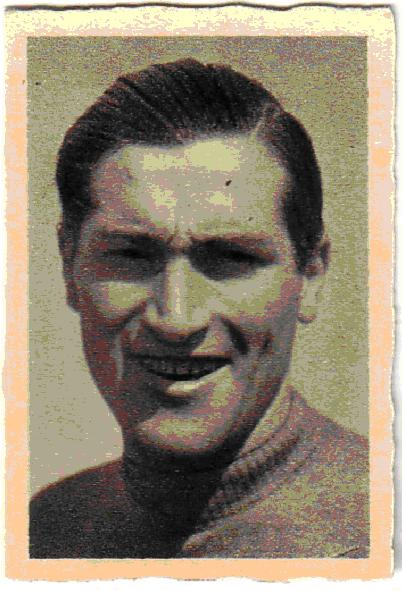
- Ettore Puricelli

Personal information
- Full name: Héctor Puricelli
- Date of birth: 15 September 1916
- Place of birth: Montevideo, Uruguay
- Date of death: 14 May 2001 (aged 84)
- Position: Striker

Senior career*
Years	Team	Apps	(Gls)
1935–1936	River Plate (URU)	?	(?)
1936–1938	Central Español	?	(?)
1938–1944	Bologna	139	(87)
1944–1949	Milan	114	(55)
1949–1951	Legnano	38	(25)
Total		291	(167)

International career
1939	Italy	1	(1)

Managerial career
- 1954–1956: Milan
- 1956–1957: Palermo
- 1959–1960: Porto
- 1960–1961: Salernitana
- 1965–1966: Atalanta
- 1966: Alessandria
- 1967–1968: Cagliari
- 1969–1971: Vicenza
- 1973–1975: Vicenza
- 1978–1979: Genoa
- 1980–1981: Foggia
- * Club domestic league appearances and goals

Héctor "Ettore" Puricelli (Italian pronunciation: [ˈɛttore puriˈtʃɛlli]; 15 September 1916 – 14 May 2001) was a football player and manager who played as a striker. Born in Uruguay, he represented Italy at international level. As a player, he is most famous for his time with Italian clubs Bologna and Milan. A prolific goalscorer, he was known for his ability in the air, which earned him the nickname "testina d'oro" ("golden little head," in Italian).

== Career ==
After playing for his hometown side Central Español from Montevideo, Puricelli decided to move from Uruguay to Italy in 1938 to play for Serie A side Bologna. The club were going through a good spell in their history and with goals from Puricelli they were able to continue that; in his first season they won the Italian championship of 1938–39.

In his first season Puricelli was joint-capcannoniere (top scorer) in Serie A, along with Aldo Boffi of Milan, with 19 goals. He repeated this feat in 1940–41 with 22 goals, also winning his second league title with Bologna that season.

After World War II, Puricelli joined Milan and although his goalscoring record continued in healthy fashion, the club did not capture the league championship; the nearest they came during this period was runners-up in 1947–48, serving as the team's captain. He ended his playing career with Legnano in Serie B still prolific in his goalscoring.

== Honours ==
=== Player ===
==== Club ====
Bologna

- Serie A: 1938–39, 1940–41

==== Individual ====
- Capocannoniere: 1938–39, 1940–41

=== Manager ===
A.C. Milan

- Serie A: 1954–55
- Latin Cup: 1956

Sporting positions
Preceded by Giuseppe Antonini	Milan captain 1948	Succeeded by Andrea Bonomi
