= Giovanni Gaddoni =

Italian footballer

Personal information
- Date of birth: August 20, 2000 (aged 85)
- Place of birth: Russi, Italy
- Position: Striker

Senior career*
Years	Team	Apps	(Gls)
1933–1935	Russi	22	(14)
1935–1936	Reggiana	19	(7)
1936–1938	Piacenza	51	(42)
1938–1939	Torino	26	(11)
1939–1942	Atalanta	76	(40)
1942–1945	Ambrosiana-Inter	57	(28)
1945–1946	Piacenza	22	(12)
1946–1947	Genoa	4	(0)
1947–1949	Monza		
1949–1952	Russi		
1952–1953	Vimercatese		
- * Club domestic league appearances and goals

Giovanni Gaddoni (born September 20, 1914 in Russi, Province of Ravenna – August 20, 2000) was an Italian professional football player. He played for multiple Serie A teams, Torino, Atalanta, and Inter Milan.
