= 1936–37 Serie A =

36th season of top-tier Italian football

Serie A
- Season: 1936–37
- Champions: Bologna; 4th title
- Relegated: Novara; Alessandria
- Matches: 240
- Goals: 639 (2.66 per match)
- Top goalscorer: Silvio Piola (21 goals)

The 1936-37 Serie A was the thirty-seventh edition of the Italian Football Championship and the eighth since 1929 re-branding to create Serie A. It was the fourteenth season from which the Italian Football Champions adorned their team jerseys in the subsequent season with a Scudetto. Bologna were champions for the second successive season and fourth time in their history. This was their fourth scudetto since the scudetto started being awarded in 1924 and their second win contested as Serie A. This continued a run of four Bologna wins from six consecutive Serie A competitions until 1941.

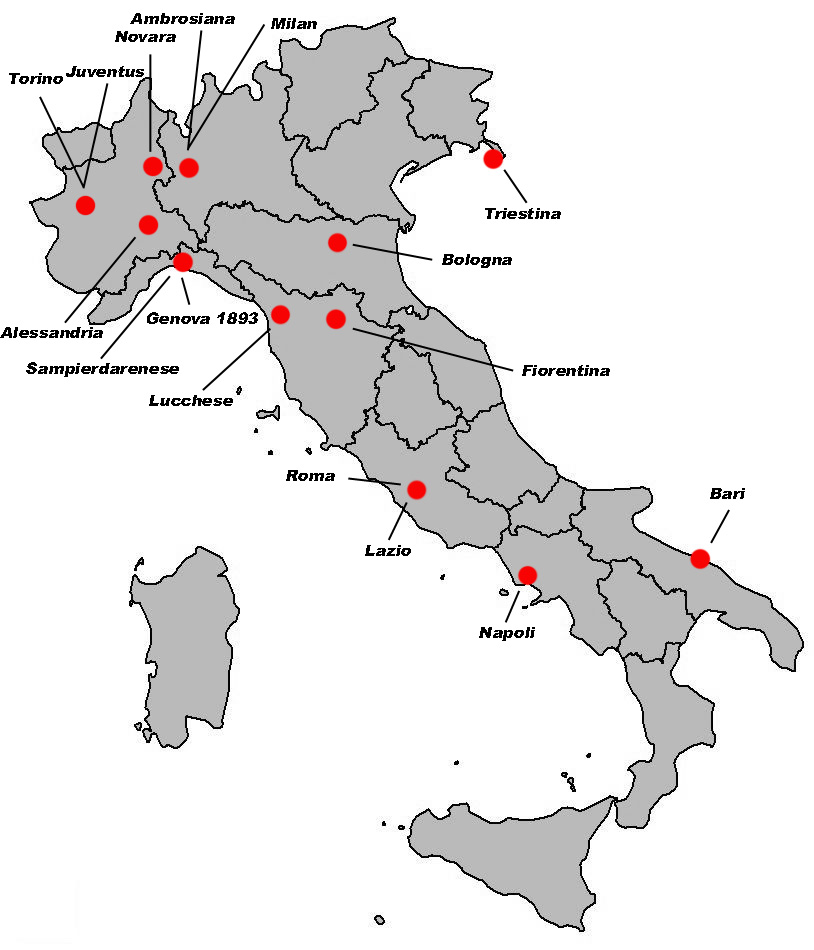
Serie A 1936-37 teams distribution

== Teams ==
Lucchese and Novara had been promoted from Serie B.

== Final classification ==
Pos	Team	Pld	W	D	L	GF	GA	GD	Pts	Qualification or relegation
1	Bologna (C)	30	15	12	3	45	26	+19	42	1937 Mitropa Cup
2	Lazio	30	17	5	8	56	42	+14	39	1937 Mitropa Cup
3	Torino	30	13	12	5	50	25	+25	38	
4	Milan	30	13	10	7	39	29	+10	36	
5	Juventus	30	12	11	7	53	31	+22	35	
6	Genova 1893	30	11	11	8	51	36	+15	33	1937 Mitropa Cup
7	Ambrosiana-Inter	30	9	13	8	43	35	+8	31	
7	Lucchese	30	9	13	8	39	43	−4	31	
9	Fiorentina	30	9	12	9	34	32	+2	30	
10	Roma	30	10	7	13	36	45	−9	27	
10	Bari	30	9	9	12	35	45	−10	27	
12	Triestina	30	7	12	11	29	36	−7	26	
13	Napoli	30	8	8	14	31	39	−8	24	
14	Sampierdarenese	30	6	10	14	32	46	−14	22	
15	Novara (R)	30	8	5	17	43	62	−19	21	Relegation to Serie B
16	Alessandria (R)	30	8	2	20	23	67	−44	18	Relegation to Serie B

Source: Panini
(C) Champions; (R) Relegated

Note: Genova qualified as Coppa Italia winners.

== Results ==
Home \ Away	ALE	AMB	BAR	BOL	FIO	GEN	JUV	LAZ	LUC	MIL	NAP	NOV	ROM	SAM	TOR	TRI
Alessandria		0–3	0–2	0–1	1–0	2–1	1–0	1–5	1–0	1–3	2–0	1–3	5–3	1–0	0–0	0–0
Ambrosiana-Inter	3–0		2–2	0–1	2–2	0–1	2–0	2–2	2–2	1–1	2–2	3–1	2–1	1–1	1–0	1–2
Bari	2–1	1–1		0–1	1–1	1–0	1–1	0–2	2–0	2–0	3–1	4–1	1–0	0–1	0–0	4–0
Bologna	4–0	1–0	2–2		1–1	4–4	1–1	1–1	0–0	2–0	2–1	5–1	1–0	4–1	0–1	2–0
Fiorentina	1–0	1–0	1–0	0–0		1–2	2–2	5–1	2–2	1–2	1–1	1–0	2–0	2–1	1–0	2–1
Genova 1893	4–0	1–2	3–1	0–1	1–1		1–1	4–1	1–1	0–1	0–1	5–1	3–1	1–1	2–2	4–3
Juventus	4–1	1–1	2–0	0–0	3–0	2–2		6–1	1–1	2–0	2–0	1–1	5–1	3–1	0–1	0–0
Lazio	4–0	1–0	3–1	0–0	2–1	2–1	1–0		2–1	3–0	4–0	1–0	0–1	1–0	0–0	2–1
Lucchese	1–0	1–0	0–0	2–2	1–1	2–2	1–1	1–0		0–0	3–2	3–1	5–1	1–0	3–1	1–1
Milan	4–1	1–1	4–0	1–0	1–0	2–2	3–4	5–3	3–0		1–0	2–0	1–0	2–2	0–0	0–0
Napoli	2–0	2–1	3–0	0–1	1–0	0–0	0–1	3–5	4–2	0–1		4–0	0–0	0–2	1–1	0–0
Novara	3–4	3–5	1–1	4–0	2–1	1–0	0–2	2–4	1–2	1–0	0–0		5–1	3–3	0–0	2–1
Roma	1–0	0–0	5–2	0–1	2–2	0–0	3–1	3–1	3–0	0–0	1–0	1–0		3–0	1–1	1–3
Sampierdarenese	5–0	2–2	2–0	2–2	1–1	0–2	2–6	0–2	3–0	0–0	0–2	2–1	0–1		0–1	0–0
Torino	5–0	1–2	6–1	3–3	0–0	1–3	2–1	2–2	2–2	3–1	3–0	4–1	2–0	4–0		2–0
Triestina	3–0	1–1	1–1	1–2	1–0	0–1	1–0	1–0	4–1	0–0	1–1	1–4	2–2	0–0	0–2	

Source: Almanacco Illustrato del Calcio - La Storia 1898-2004, Panini Edizioni, Modena, September 2005 (in Italian)
Legend: Blue = home team win; Yellow = draw; Red = away team win.

== Top goalscorers ==
Rank	Player	Club	Goals
1	(Italy) Silvio Piola	Lazio	21
2	(Italy) Guglielmo Gabetto	Juventus	18
3	(Italy) Pietro Buscaglia	Torino	17
4	(Italy) Felice Borel	Juventus	16
4	(Italy) Alfredo Marchionneschi	Genova 1893	16
6	(Italy) Umberto Busani	Lazio	15
7	(Italy) Elpidio Coppa	Lucchese	13
7	(Italy) Danilo Michelini	Lucchese	13
7	(Italy) Otello Torri	Novara	13
10	(Italy) Ezio Rizzotti	Novara	12
10	(Italy) Carlo Reguzzoni	Bologna	12
10	(Italy) Egidio Capra	Milan	12
13	(Italy) Annibale Frossi	Ambrosiana-Inter	11
13	(Italy) Giuseppe Meazza	Ambrosiana-Inter	11
15	(Italy) Remo Galli	Torino	10
15	(Italy) Vinicio Viani	Fiorentina	10
17	(Italy) Cesare Fasanelli	Genova 1893	9
17	(Italy) Luigi Pantani	Genova 1893	9

== References and sources ==
- Almanacco Illustrato del Calcio - La Storia 1898-2004, Panini Edizioni, Modena, September 2005
