= Carlo Reguzzoni =

Italian footballer (1908-1996)

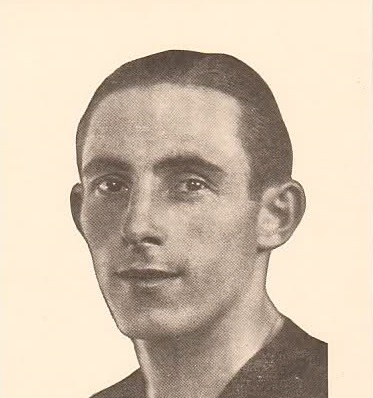

Personal information
- Date of birth: 18 January 1908
- Place of birth: Busto Arsizio, Kingdom of Italy
- Date of death: 16 December 1996 (aged 88)
- Place of death: Busto Arsizio, Italy
- Positions: Forward; winger

Senior career*
Years	Team	Apps	(Gls)
1927–1930	Pro Patria	75	(52)
1930–1943	Bologna	359	(141)
1944	Pro Patria	14	(3)
1945–1946	Bologna	18	(2)
1946–1948	Pro Patria	51	(14)
Total		517	(212)

International career
1940	Italy	1	(0)
- * Club domestic league appearances and goals

Carlo Reguzzoni (Italian pronunciation: [ˈkarlo reɡutˈtsoːni]; 18 January 1908 – 16 December 1996) was an Italian footballer who played as a winger.

== Club career ==
Reguzzoni was born in Busto Arsizio, in the province of Varese, Lombardy. He made his Serie A debut with Pro Patria on 6 October 1929, in a 4–2 home win over Cremonese. He also played with Bologna in the 1930s and 1940s, where he spent most of his career, scoring 143 goals in 377 games for the club, making him Bologna's second highest goalscorer of all-time, behind only Angelo Schiavio. In total, he scored 155 goals in 401 appearances in Serie A.

== International career ==
Reguzzoni made his only appearance for the Italy national football team on 14 April 1940, in a 2–1 home win over Romania.

== Honours ==
=== Club ===
Bologna

- Serie A: 1935–36, 1936–37, 1938–39, 1940–41
