= 1940–41 Serie A =

40th season of top-tier Italian football

Serie A
- Season: 1940–41
- Champions: Bologna; 6th title
- Relegated: Novara; Bari
- Matches: 240
- Goals: 733 (3.05 per match)
- Top goalscorer: Ettore Puricelli (22 goals)

The 1940-41 Serie A was the forty-first edition of the Italian Football Championship and its twelfth since 1929 re-branding to create Serie A. It was the eighteenth season from which the Italian Football Champions adorned their team jerseys in the subsequent season with a Scudetto. Bologna were champions for the sixth time in their history. This was their sixth scudetto since the scudetto started being awarded in 1924 and their fourth win contested as Serie A. This completed the twice Ambrosiana-Inter punctuated run of four Bologna wins from six consecutive Serie A competitions.

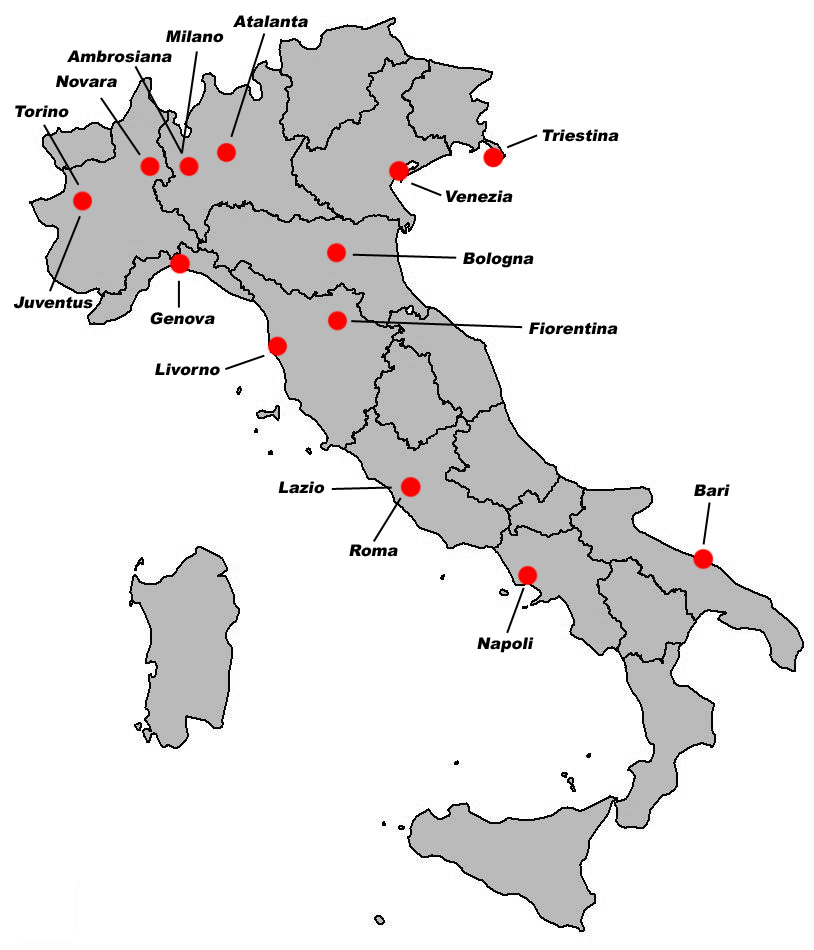
Serie A 1940-41 teams distribution

== Teams ==
Atalanta and Livorno had been promoted from Serie B.

== Final classification ==
| Pos | Team | Pld | W | D | L | GF | GA | GR | Pts | Qualification or relegation |
|---|---|---|---|---|---|---|---|---|---|---|
| 1 | Bologna (C) | 30 | 16 | 7 | 7 | 60 | 37 | 1.622 | 39 | |
| 2 | Ambrosiana-Inter | 30 | 14 | 7 | 9 | 52 | 42 | 1.238 | 35 | |
| 3 | Milano | 30 | 12 | 10 | 8 | 55 | 34 | 1.618 | 34 | |
| 4 | Fiorentina | 30 | 14 | 6 | 10 | 60 | 49 | 1.224 | 34 | |
| 5 | Juventus | 30 | 12 | 8 | 10 | 50 | 47 | 1.064 | 32 | |
| 6 | Atalanta | 30 | 11 | 9 | 10 | 45 | 38 | 1.184 | 31 | |
| 7 | Torino | 30 | 11 | 8 | 11 | 54 | 50 | 1.080 | 30 | |
| 8 | Napoli | 30 | 11 | 8 | 11 | 41 | 48 | 0.854 | 30 | |
| 9 | Triestina | 30 | 9 | 11 | 10 | 43 | 39 | 1.103 | 29 | |
| 10 | Genova 1893 | 30 | 10 | 9 | 11 | 46 | 44 | 1.045 | 29 | |
| 11 | Roma | 30 | 9 | 11 | 10 | 48 | 46 | 1.043 | 29 | |
| 12 | Venezia | 30 | 8 | 13 | 9 | 39 | 44 | 0.886 | 29 | |
| 13 | Livorno | 30 | 9 | 10 | 11 | 40 | 51 | 0.784 | 28 | |
| 14 | Lazio | 30 | 7 | 13 | 10 | 38 | 42 | 0.905 | 27 | |
| 15 | Novara (R) | 30 | 8 | 11 | 11 | 31 | 38 | 0.816 | 27 | Relegation to Serie B |
| 16 | Bari (R) | 30 | 5 | 7 | 18 | 31 | 84 | 0.369 | 17 | Relegation to Serie B |

Source: goal average officially used in event of equal points.
(C) Champions; (R) Relegated

== Results ==
| Home \ Away | AMB | ATA | BAR | BOL | FIO | GEN | JUV | LAZ | LIV | MIL | NAP | NOV | ROM | TOR | TRI | VEN |
|---|---|---|---|---|---|---|---|---|---|---|---|---|---|---|---|---|
| Ambrosiana-Inter | | 2–1 | 5–0 | 2–1 | 0–2 | 4–0 | 2–1 | 1–1 | 3–0 | 2–2 | 1–0 | 0–0 | 5–1 | 0–2 | 1–1 | 4–2 |
| Atalanta | 1–3 | | 4–0 | 2–0 | 0–0 | 1–1 | 3–0 | 2–0 | 2–1 | 2–1 | 4–0 | 2–0 | 0–0 | 0–1 | 2–0 | 3–1 |
| Bari | 0–0 | 2–2 | | 1–0 | 1–0 | 1–1 | 3–5 | 1–2 | 1–1 | 1–3 | 0–4 | 1–2 | 2–2 | 1–0 | 0–3 | 3–2 |
| Bologna | 5–0 | 1–0 | 5–1 | | 5–3 | 4–1 | 1–0 | 2–2 | 3–0 | 4–2 | 3–0 | 3–0 | 2–1 | 3–0 | 2–0 | 1–1 |
| Fiorentina | 2–1 | 1–1 | 4–0 | 3–0 | | 4–3 | 5–0 | 2–1 | 5–2 | 2–3 | 1–2 | 2–2 | 1–1 | 2–1 | 6–3 | 2–1 |
| Genova 1893 | 2–0 | 2–0 | 6–1 | 0–1 | 0–1 | | 2–0 | 2–2 | 3–0 | 1–1 | 1–2 | 1–1 | 0–0 | 4–0 | 2–1 | 1–0 |
| Juventus | 2–0 | 3–1 | 5–1 | 3–1 | 2–3 | 2–0 | | 3–2 | 2–1 | 1–2 | 0–0 | 3–0 | 3–1 | 2–1 | 1–1 | 2–2 |
| Lazio | 2–4 | 1–1 | 2–2 | 2–4 | 4–1 | 0–1 | 2–2 | | 1–0 | 0–0 | 1–1 | 0–0 | 2–0 | 0–2 | 2–1 | 4–1 |
| Livorno | 1–1 | 3–1 | 1–0 | 2–2 | 1–1 | 2–2 | 1–0 | 2–1 | | 1–0 | 1–1 | 1–1 | 6–1 | 0–1 | 2–1 | 3–1 |
| Milano | 0–1 | 0–3 | 5–0 | 5–1 | 3–1 | 1–1 | 2–2 | 3–0 | 5–0 | | 4–0 | 2–0 | 1–3 | 1–1 | 1–1 | 0–0 |
| Napoli | 0–1 | 4–1 | 3–1 | 4–4 | 0–2 | 1–0 | 2–2 | 0–2 (Note: Decided by the FIGC.) | 1–2 | 3–2 | | 2–0 | 2–1 | 2–1 | 1–0 | 1–1 |
| Novara | 2–4 | 5–1 | 4–0 | 0–1 | 2–0 | 2–1 | 1–2 | 0–0 | 0–0 | 2–0 | 1–0 | | 1–1 | 1–1 | 0–0 | 0–0 |
| Roma | 3–0 | 1–0 | 6–2 | 1–1 | 1–1 | 3–0 | 3–0 | 1–1 | 3–1 | 1–2 | 2–2 | 1–3 | | 4–1 | 0–0 | 5–2 |
| Torino | 5–5 | 1–1 | 4–0 | 0–0 | 6–2 | 3–6 | 2–0 | 1–1 | 5–2 | 0–4 | 6–2 | 5–1 | 0–0 | | 2–1 | 0–2 |
| Triestina | 2–0 | 3–3 | 2–4 | 0–0 | 1–0 | 6–2 | 1–1 | 0–0 | 1–1 | 0–0 | 2–0 | 1–0 | 4–1 | 1–0 | | 3–1 |
| Venezia | 1–0 | 1–1 | 1–1 | 1–0 | 2–1 | 0–0 | 1–1 | 2–0 | 2–2 | 0–0 | 1–1 | 3–0 | 1–0 | 2–2 | 4–3 | |

Source: Almanacco Illustrato del Calcio - La Storia 1898-2004, Panini Edizioni, Modena, September 2005 (in Italian)
Legend: Blue = home team win; Yellow = draw; Red = away team win.

== Top goalscorers ==
| Rank | Player | Club | Goals |
|---|---|---|---|
| 1 | (Uruguay) (Italy) Ettore Puricelli | Bologna | 22 |
| 2 | (Italy) Amedeo Amadei | Roma | 18 |
| 2 | (Italy) Romeo Menti | Fiorentina | 18 |
| 4 | (Italy) Carlo Reguzzoni | Bologna | 17 |
| 5 | (Italy) Aldo Boffi | Milano | 16 |
| 5 | (Italy) Guglielmo Gabetto | Juventus | 16 |
| 7 | (Italy) Franco Ossola | Torino | 14 |
| 8 | (Italy) Luigi Rosellini | Napoli | 13 |
| 9 | (Italy) Gino Cappello | Milano | 12 |
| 9 | (Italy) Francesco Cergoli | Triestina | 12 |
| 9 | (Italy) Dante Di Benedetti | Fiorentina | 12 |
| 12 | (Argentina) Michelangelo Pantò | Roma | 11 |
| 12 | (Italy) Giacomo Neri | Genova 1893 | 11 |
| 14 | (Italy) Severino Cominelli | Atalanta | 10 |
| 14 | (Italy) Vinicio Viani | Livorno | 10 |
| 14 | (Italy) Silvio Piola | Lazio | 10 |

== References and sources ==
- Almanacco Illustrato del Calcio - La Storia 1898-2004, Panini Edizioni, Modena, September 2005
