= 1938–39 Serie A =

38th season of top-tier Italian football

Serie A
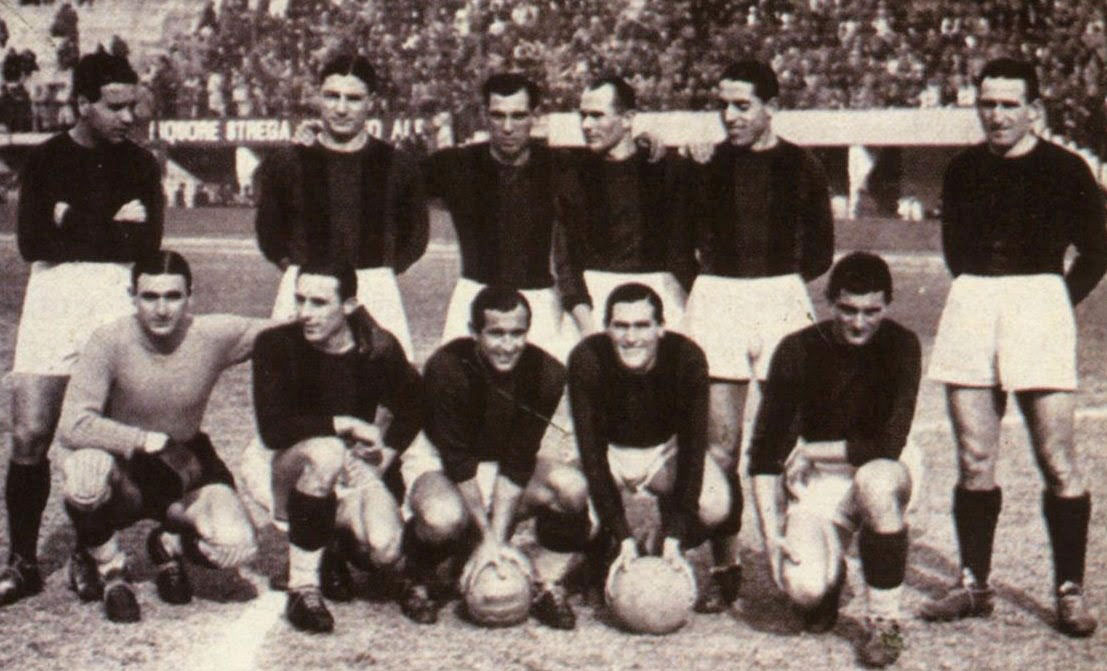
- 1938–39 Bologna's squad
- Season: 1938–39
- Champions: Bologna; 5th title
- Relegated: Livorno; Lucchese
- Matches: 240
- Goals: 593 (2.47 per match)
- Top goalscorer: Aldo Boffi; Ettore Puricelli (19 goals each)

The 1938-39 Serie A was the thirty-ninth edition of the Italian Football Championship and its tenth since 1929 re-branding to create Serie A. It was the sixteenth season from which the Italian Football Champions adorned their team jerseys in the subsequent season with a Scudetto. Bologna were champions for the fifth time in their history. This was their fifth scudetto since the scudetto started being awarded in 1924 and their third win contested as Serie A. This re-ignited the Ambrosiana-Inter punctuated run of four Bologna wins from six consecutive Serie A competitions until 1941.

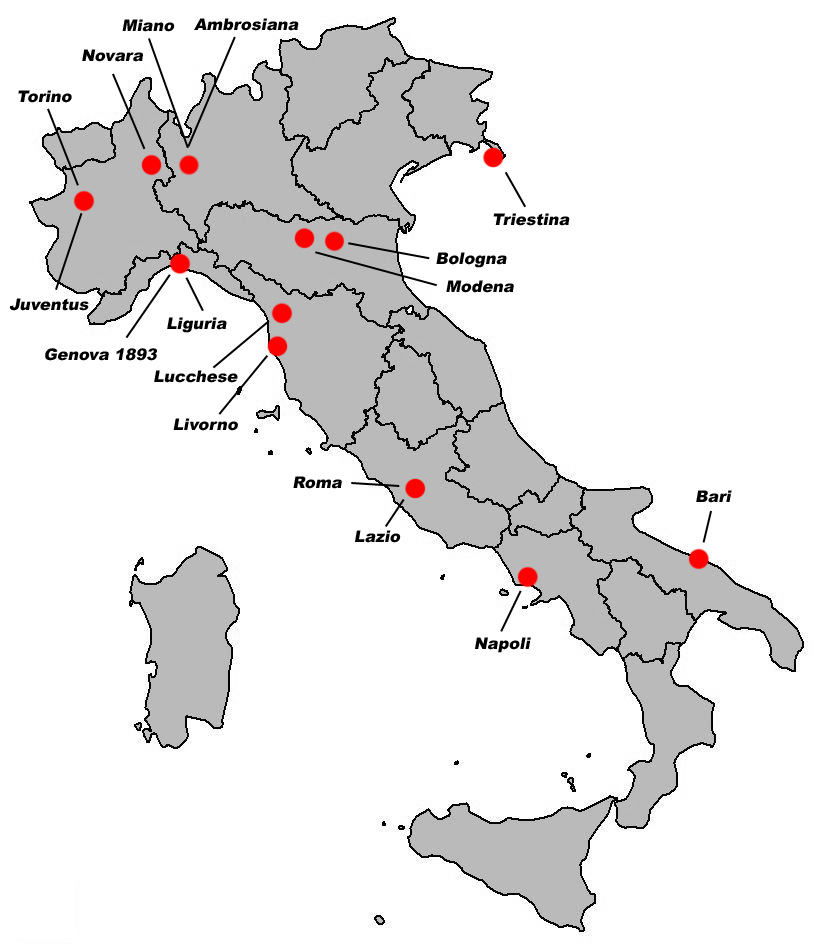
Serie A 1938-39 teams distribution

== Teams ==
Novara and Modena had been promoted from Serie B.

== Events ==
The goal average substituted the tie-breaker in event of equal points, to save time considering the risk of war. This change greatly helped Triestina.

== Final classification ==
Pos	Team	Pld	W	D	L	GF	GA	GR	Pts	Qualification or relegation
1	Bologna (C)	30	16	10	4	53	31	1.710	42	1939 Mitropa Cup
2	Torino	30	14	10	6	45	34	1.324	38	
3	Ambrosiana-Inter	30	14	9	7	55	37	1.486	37	1939 Mitropa Cup
4	Genova 1893	30	14	7	9	53	30	1.767	35	
5	Roma	30	14	3	13	39	35	1.114	31	
6	Liguria	30	12	7	11	35	34	1.029	31	
7	Napoli	30	10	11	9	30	35	0.857	31	
8	Juventus	30	8	13	9	28	34	0.824	29	
9	Milano	30	10	8	12	36	34	1.059	28	
10	Lazio	30	11	6	13	33	40	0.825	28	
11	Bari	30	9	9	12	33	46	0.717	27	
12	Novara	30	9	8	13	27	32	0.844	26	
13	Modena	30	8	9	13	32	40	0.800	25	
14	Triestina	30	7	10	13	23	28	0.821	24	
15	Livorno (R)	30	9	6	15	40	49	0.816	24	Relegation to Serie B
16	Lucchese (R)	30	7	10	13	31	54	0.574	24	Relegation to Serie B

Source: goal average officially used in event of equal points.
(C) Champions; (R) Relegated

Note: Ambrosiana-Inter qualified as Coppa Italia winners.

== Results ==
Home \ Away	AMB	BAR	BOL	GEN	JUV	LAZ	LIG	LIV	LUC	MIL	MOD	NAP	NOV	ROM	TOR	TRI
Ambrosiana-Inter		5–3	2–0	1–0	5–0	1–1	5–2	3–1	7–1	1–0	4–2	1–2	3–1	0–0	1–1	0–0
Bari	4–1		2–2	0–0	1–1	2–1	2–1	2–0	1–1	2–1	1–0	1–1	1–0	3–1	0–0	0–0
Bologna	1–1	4–3		3–0	1–0	2–0	1–1	1–1	2–2	2–1	1–1	4–0	3–0	1–0	0–3	2–0
Genova 1893	3–0	8–0	2–3		3–2	2–1	0–1	0–1	4–1	2–0	5–1	3–1	3–1	2–0	6–1	0–0
Juventus	0–0	3–0	1–0	1–1		1–0	2–1	2–1	1–1	2–2	1–1	1–0	1–0	0–0	1–1	2–1
Lazio	1–2	1–0	1–2	2–1	1–1		1–0	2–1	5–0	2–2	2–1	0–0	1–0	1–3	1–1	1–0
Liguria	1–0	1–0	1–2	1–0	1–1	0–1		3–3	1–1	0–1	1–0	2–0	3–1	3–2	2–1	2–2
Livorno	2–2	3–0	3–1	2–2	1–0	2–3	0–1		1–0	0–2	1–0	2–0	0–2	3–1	1–1	1–0
Lucchese	1–1	0–0	1–1	0–1	1–0	2–1	3–1	2–1		1–2	3–1	2–2	0–1	1–4	1–1	1–0
Milano	3–1	3–1	0–1	1–2	0–0	3–0	0–0	2–2	1–0		2–0	0–0	2–1	0–1	0–0	2–4
Modena	1–1	0–2	1–1	0–0	2–0	4–0	2–3	3–2	0–1	2–2		2–1	1–1	2–0	0–1	1–0
Napoli	1–0	1–1	1–6	2–0	4–1	0–0	0–0	3–1	3–1	1–0	0–1		2–1	1–0	0–0	2–0
Novara	0–1	2–0	1–3	0–0	0–0	2–0	1–0	2–1	1–1	2–1	0–0	0–0		5–0	0–1	1–0
Roma	2–3	2–0	0–1	3–1	1–0	0–2	1–0	4–1	3–0	1–0	0–1	2–2	3–0		2–0	1–2
Torino	2–1	2–1	1–1	0–1	3–2	3–1	1–0	3–2	5–1	3–2	4–2	3–0	1–1	0–1		1–0
Triestina	1–2	1–0	1–1	1–1	1–1	2–0	0–2	2–0	2–1	0–1	0–0	0–0	0–0	0–1	3–1	

Source: Almanacco Illustrato del Calcio - La Storia 1898-2004, Panini Edizioni, Modena, September 2005 (in Italian)
Legend: Blue = home team win; Yellow = draw; Red = away team win.

== Top goalscorers ==
Rank	Player	Club	Goals
1	(Italy) Aldo Boffi	Milano	19
1	(Uruguay) (Italy) Ettore Puricelli	Bologna	19
3	(Italy) Alfredo Lazzaretti	Genova 1893	14
4	(Italy) Danilo Michelini	Roma	13
5	(Italy) Giovanni Gaddoni	Torino	11
5	(Italy) Luigi Scarabello	Genova 1893	11
5	(Italy) Vinicio Viani	Livorno	11
8	(Italy) Pietro Ferraris	Ambrosiana-Inter	10
8	(Italy) Annibale Frossi	Ambrosiana-Inter	10
8	(Italy) Guglielmo Gabetto	Juventus	10
8	(Italy) Ottorino Dugini	Bari	10
8	(Italy) Arrigo Morselli	Genova 1893	10
8	(Italy) Guglielmo Trevisan	Triestina	10
14	(Italy) Aldo Campatelli	Ambrosiana-Inter	9

== References and sources ==
- Almanacco Illustrato del Calcio - La Storia 1898-2004, Panini Edizioni, Modena, September 2005
