= 1939–40 AS Ambrosiana-Inter season =

Associazione Sportiva Ambrosiana-Inter
1939–40 season
- Chairman: Ferdinando Pozzani
- Manager: Tony Cargnelli
- Stadium: Arena Civica
- Serie A: 1st
- Coppa Italia: round of 32
- Top goalscorer: League: Guarnieri (15); All: Guarnieri (16)
Home colours

The 1939-40 season was Associazione Sportiva Ambrosiana-Inter's 31st in existence and 24th consecutive season in the top flight of Italian football.

== Summary ==
The club clinched the title, the fifth in its history, and the third as Ambrosiana. In the Coppa Italia, Ambrosiana Inter lost to Torino. In the Mitropa Cup the squad was defeated by Újpest and its manager Bela Guttmann. An injury to the left foot of Meazza saw him resigned to the bench for almost the entire season. Still the Nerazzurri managed to top the table with Tony Cargnelli as manager, defeating Bologna in the final round of matches and lifted the title at the San Siro, the stadium of fierce rivals Milan, due to the stadium having a higher capacity Arena Civica.

== Squad ==
Note: Flags indicate national team as defined under FIFA eligibility rules; some limited exceptions apply. Players may hold more than one non-FIFA nationality.

Pos.	Nation	Player
GK	ITA	Angelo Caimo
GK	ITA	Giuseppe Peruchetti
DF	ITA	Giuseppe Ballerio
DF	ITA	Celso Battaia
DF	ITA	Carmelo Buonocore
DF	ITA	Ugo Locatelli
DF	ITA	Bernardo Poli
DF	ITA	Duilio Setti
MF	ITA	Aldo Campatelli
MF	ITA	Enrico Candiani
MF	ITA	Antonio Caracciolo
MF	ITA	Attilio Demaría

Pos.	Nation	Player
MF	ITA	Giovanni Ferrari
MF	ITA	Ezio Meneghello
MF	ITA	Renato Olmi
MF	ARG	Víctor Pozzo
FW	ITA	Giorgio Barsanti
FW	ITA	Pietro Ferraris II
FW	ITA	Annibale Frossi
FW	ITA	Umberto Guarnieri
FW	ITA	Giuseppe Meazza
FW	ITA	Pietro Rebuzzi
FW	ITA	Vittorio Rovelli

== Competitions ==
=== Serie A ===
==== League table ====
Pos	Team	Pld	W	D	L	GF	GA	GR	Pts
1	Ambrosiana-Inter (C)	30	20	4	6	56	23	2.435	44
2	Bologna	30	16	9	5	44	23	1.913	41
3	Juventus	30	15	6	9	45	40	1.125	36
4	Lazio	30	12	11	7	44	36	1.222	35
5	Genova 1893	30	14	5	11	56	47	1.191	33

Source: goal average officially used in event of equal points.
(C) Champions

==== Matches ====
Win Draw Loss

17 September 1939 1	Ambrosiana-Inter	4–0	Juventus	Milan
	Frossi 63', 69'; Guarnieri 67', 74'	Report		Stadium: Arena Civica; Referee: Mario Ciamberlini

24 September 1939 2	Venezia	2–1	Ambrosiana-Inter	Venice
	De Filippis 13'; Pernigo 42'	Report	2' (pen.) Demaría	Stadium: Stadio Pier Luigi Penzo; Referee: Francesco Mattea

1 October 1939 3	Ambrosiana-Inter	4–0	Napoli	Milan
	Ferraris II 15'; Guarnieri 30', 75'; Locatelli 81'	Report		Stadium: Arena Civica; Referee: Giorgio Moretti

8 October 1939 4	Liguria	0–2	Ambrosiana-Inter	Genoa
		Report	31' Candiani; 46' Guarnieri	Stadium: Stadio del Littorio; Referee: Generoso Dattilo

15 October 1939 5	Bari	3–0	Ambrosiana-Inter	Bari
	Dugini 30'; Begnini 32', 47'	Report		Stadium: Stadio della Vittoria; Referee: Raffaele Scorzoni

22 October 1939 6	Ambrosiana-Inter	3–0	Roma	Milan
	Demaría 43'; Guarnieri 49', 67'	Report		Stadium: Arena Civica; Referee: Giovanni Galeati

29 October 1939 7	Triestina	2–1	Ambrosiana-Inter	Trieste
	Trevisan 30'; Rancilio 49'	Report	3' Guarnieri	Stadium: Stadio Littorio; Referee: Mario Ciamberlini

5 November 1939 8	Ambrosiana-Inter	2–1	Modena	Milan
	Ferraris II 30'; Demaría 82' (pen.)	Report	35' Montanari	Stadium: Arena Civica; Referee: Giuseppe Scarpi

19 November 1939 9	Torino	0–1	Ambrosiana-Inter	Turin
		Report	61' Demaría	Stadium: Stadio Filadelfia; Referee: Generoso Dattilo

3 December 1939 10	Ambrosiana-Inter	3–0	Fiorentina	Milan
	Ferraris II 8'; Candiani 26'; Demaría 49'	Report		Stadium: Arena Civica; Referee: Giacomo Bertolio

10 December 1939 13	Genoa	2–2	Ambrosiana-Inter	Genoa
	Gabardo 25'; Conti 54'	Report	13' Candiani; 58' (pen.) Demaría	Stadium: Stadio Luigi Ferraris; Referee: Giacomo Bertolio

17 December 1939 12	Ambrosiana-Inter	0–3	Milano	Milan
		Report	19' Chizzo; 56', 75' Boffi	Stadium: Arena Civica; Referee: Raffaele Scorzoni

31 December 1939 13	Lazio	1–1	Ambrosiana-Inter	Rome
	Piola 56'	Report	44' Demaría	Stadium: Stadio Nazionale del PNF; Referee: Giovanni Galeati

7 January 1940 14	Ambrosiana-Inter	1–0	Novara	Milan
	Guarnieri 84'	Report		Stadium: Arena Civica; Referee: Emiliano Saracini

14 January 1940 15	Bologna	0–0	Ambrosiana-Inter	Bologna
		Report		Stadium: Stadio Littoriale; Referee: Attilio Soliani

21 January 1940 16	Juventus	1–0	Ambrosiana-Inter	Turin
	Gabetto 8'	Report		Stadium: Stadio Benito Mussolini; Referee: Giuseppe Scarpi

28 January 1940 17	Ambrosiana-Inter	2–1	Venezia	Milan
	Guarnieri 10', 70'	Report	18' Alberti	Stadium: Arena Civica; Referee: Giacomo Bertolio

4 February 1940 18	Napoli	0–1	Ambrosiana-Inter	Naples
		Report	78' Guarnieri	Stadium: Stadio Partenopeo; Referee: Raffaele Scorzoni

11 February 1940 19	Ambrosiana-Inter	1–0	Liguria	Milan
	Demaría 43'	Report		Stadium: Arena Civica; Referee: Giovanni Galeati

18 February 1940 20	Ambrosiana-Inter	0–0	Bari	Milan
		Report		Stadium: Arena Civica; Referee: Giacomo Bertolio

25 February 1940 21	Roma	1–2	Ambrosiana-Inter	Rome
	Alghisi 36'	Report	65' Frossi; 84' Ferraris II	Stadium: Stadio Nazionale del PNF; Referee: Raffaele Scorzoni

10 March 1940 22	Ambrosiana-Inter	5–1	Triestina	Milan
	Candiani 25', 36'; Guarnieri 41', 79'; Grezar 85' (o.g.)	Report	15' Tosolini	Stadium: Arena Civica; Referee: Oreste Dellarole

17 March 1940 23	Modena	1–2	Ambrosiana-Inter	Modena
	Montanari 48'	Report	37' Frossi; 42' Candiani	Stadium: Stadio Cesare Marzari; Referee: Generoso Dattilo

24 March 1940 24	Ambrosiana-Inter	5–1	Torino	Milan
	Candiani 1'; Demaría 32' (pen.); Guarnieri 50'; Frossi 69'; Campatelli 73'	Report	10' Allasio	Stadium: Arena Civica; Referee: Mario Ciamberlini

31 March 1940 25	Fiorentina	0–3	Ambrosiana-Inter	Florence
		Report	60' Rebuzzi I 63' Frossi; 76' Campatelli	Stadium: Stadio Giovanni Berta; Referee: Raffaele Scorzoni

21 April 1940 26	Ambrosiana-Inter	2–1	Genoa	Milan
	Ferraris II 43'; Demaría 55'	Report	3' Genta	Stadium: Arena Civica; Referee: Ferruccio Bonivento

12 May 1940 27	Milan	1–3	Ambrosiana-Inter	Milan
	Boffi 81' (pen.)	Report	41' Candiani; 64' (pen.) Demaría; 83' Ferraris II	Stadium: Campo San Siro; Referee: Rinaldo Barlassina

19 May 1940 28	Ambrosiana-Inter	4–0	Lazio	Milan
	Barsanti 32', 67'; Demaría 36'; Frossi 37'	Report		Stadium: Arena Civica; Referee: Giuseppe Scarpi

26 May 1940 29	Novara	1–0	Ambrosiana-Inter	Novara
	Calzolai 81'	Report		Stadium: Stadio Littorio; Referee: Mario Ciamberlini

2 June 1940 30	Ambrosiana-Inter	1–0	Bologna	Milan
	Ferraris II 9'	Report		Stadium: Campo San Siro; Referee: Generoso Dattilo

==== Round of 32 ====
24 December 1939	Ambrosiana-Inter	1–2	Torino	Milan
	Guarnieri 73'		63' Borsetti; 81' Capri	Stadium: Arena Civica; Referee: Giuseppe Zelocchi

== Statistics ==
=== Squad statistics ===
Competition	Points	Home						Away						Total						GD
Competition	Points	G	W	D	L	Gs	Ga	G	W	D	L	Gs	Ga	G	W	D	L	Gs	Ga	GD
Serie A	44	15	13	1	1	37	8	15	7	3	5	19	15	30	20	4	6	56	23	+ 33
Coppa Italia	-	1	0	0	1	1	2	-	-	-	-	-	-	1	0	0	1	1	2	1
Total	-	16	13	1	2	38	10	15	7	3	5	19	15	31	20	4	7	57	25	+ 32

=== Players statistics ===
==== Appearances ====
- 7. (Italy) Giorgio Barsanti
- 1. (Italy) Celso Battaia
- 12. (Italy) Carmelo Buonocore
- 7. (Italy) Angelo Caimo
- 31. (Italy) Aldo Campatelli
- 23. (Italy) Enrico Candiani
- 1. (Italy) Antonio Caracciolo
- 30. (Italy) Attilio Demaría
- 8. (Italy) Giovanni Ferrari
- 29. (Italy) Pietro FerrarisII
- 27. (Italy) Annibale Frossi
- 23. (Italy) Umberto Guarnieri
- 30. (Italy) Ugo Locatelli
- 4. (Italy) Ezio Meneghello
- 24. (Italy) Renato Olmi
- 24. (Italy) Giuseppe Peruchetti
- 18. (Italy) Bernardo Poli
- 6. (Argentina) Víctor Pozzo
- 3. (Italy) Pietro RebuzziI
- 2. (Italy) Vittorio Rovelli
- 27. (Italy) Duilio Setti

==== Goalscorers ====
- 2. (Italy) Giorgio Barsanti
- 2. (Italy) Aldo Campatelli
- 8. (Italy) Enrico Candiani
- 12. (Italy) Attilio Demaría
- 7. (Italy) Pietro Ferraris II
- 7. (Italy) Annibale Frossi
- 16. (Italy) Umberto Guarnieri
- 1. (Italy) Ugo Locatelli
- 1. (Italy) Pietro Rebuzzi I

== Bibliography ==
- Fabrizio Melegari. Almanacco illustrato del calcio - La storia 1898-2004, Modena. Panini, 2004.
- Stadio: Il Littoriale, years 1939 and 1940. Corriere dello Sport..
- Carlo F. Chiesa. Il grande romanzo dello scudetto. Panini.
