= 1939 Coppa Italia final =

5th Coppa Italia final
- Event: 1938–39 Coppa Italia
Ambrosiana-Inter	Novara
2	1
- Date: 18 May 1939
- Venue: Stadio Nazionale, Rome

The 1939 Coppa Italia final was the final of the 1938–39 Coppa Italia. The match was played on 18 May 1939 between Ambrosiana-Inter and Novara. Ambrosiana-Inter won 2–1.

== Match ==
18 May 1939

Ambrosiana-Inter	2–1	Novara
P.Ferraris 8'; Frossi 26'		Romano 59'

Stadio Nazionale, Rome

Ambrosiana-Inter	Novara

GK	1	(Italy) Orlando Sain
DF	2	(Italy) Carmelo Buonocore
DF	3	(Italy) Duilio Setti
MF	4	(Italy) Ugo Locatelli
MF	5	(Italy) Renato Olmi
MF	6	(Italy) Aldo Campatelli
FW	7	(Italy) Annibale Frossi
FW	8	(Italy) Atilio Demaría
FW	9	(Italy) Umberto Guarnieri
FW	10	(Italy) Giuseppe Meazza
FW	11	(Italy) Pietro Ferraris
Manager:
(Nazi Germany) Tony Cargnelli

GK	1	(Italy) Angelo Caimo
DF	2	(Italy) Virginio Bonati
DF	3	(Italy) Edoardo Galimberti
MF	4	(Italy) Carlo Rigotti
MF	5	(Italy) Edmondo Mornese
MF	6	(Italy) Angelo Galli
FW	7	(Italy) Marco Borrini
FW	8	(Italy) Marco Romano
FW	9	(Italy) Alfredo Marchionneschi
FW	10	(Italy) Remo Versaldi
FW	11	(Italy) Vittorio Barberis
Manager:
(Italy) Carlo Rigotti
