= Derby della Madonnina =

Football match between Inter Milan and AC Milan

- Inter Milan AC Milan
- Other names: Derby di Milano
- Location: Milan, Italy
- First meeting: 10 January 1909; Prima Categoria; AC Milan 3–2 Inter Milan
- Latest meeting: 31 October 2026; Serie A AC Milan 3–1 Inter Milan
- Next meeting: 14 February 2027; Serie A Inter Milan v AC Milan
- Stadiums: San Siro

Statistics
- Total meetings: Official matches: 247
- Most wins: Official matches: Inter Milan (91)
- Most player appearances: Paolo Maldini (56)
- Top scorer: Andriy Shevchenko (14)
- All-time series: Inter: 91; Drawn: 71; Milan: 85
- Largest victory: 11 May 2001; Serie A Inter Milan 0–6 AC Milan
- Largest goal scoring: 6 November 1949; Serie A Inter Milan 6–5 AC Milan
- Longest win streak: 6 matches AC Milan (1911–1913, 1946–1948); Inter (2023–2024)
- Longest unbeaten streak: 17 matches Inter Milan (1929–1937)
- Current win streak: 4 matches AC Milan (2025–present)
- Current unbeaten streak: 8 matches AC Milan (2024–present)

The Derby della Madonnina (Italian pronunciation: [ˈdɛrbi della madonˈniːna]; named after the Madonnina statue on top of the Milan Cathedral), also known as the Derby di Milano (English: Milan Derby), is a derby football match between the two prominent Milanese clubs, Inter Milan and AC Milan. Both clubs are among the most successful in Italian football history.

In the past, Inter Milan (commonly abbreviated to Inter) was seen as the club of the Milan bourgeoisie (nicknamed bauscia [baˈyʃa], a Milanese term meaning "braggart"), whereas Milan was supported mainly by the working class (nicknamed casciavid [kaʃaˈʋiːt], meaning "screwdriver", with reference to the blue-collar worker). Because of their more prosperous ancestry, Inter fans had the "luxury" to go to the San Siro stadium by motorcycle (motoretta, another nickname given to the Nerazzurri). On the other hand, the Rossoneri were also known as tramvee or tranvee (i.e. able to be transferred to the stadium only by "tram", or public transport). Today, this socioeconomic divide has largely been mitigated and preference for either club is personal or familial.

Taking place at least twice during the year via the league fixtures, this cross-town rivalry has extended to the Coppa Italia, Champions League, and Supercoppa Italiana, as well as minor tournaments and friendlies. It is one of the two major crosstown derbies in association football that are always played in the same stadium, in this case the San Siro, as both Inter and AC Milan call San Siro "home", the other derby being Derby della Capitale. Though both clubs share this stadium, Inter ultras traditionally occupy the stadium’s northern end (Curva Nord) while Milan ultras occupy the southern end (Curva Sud).

== History ==
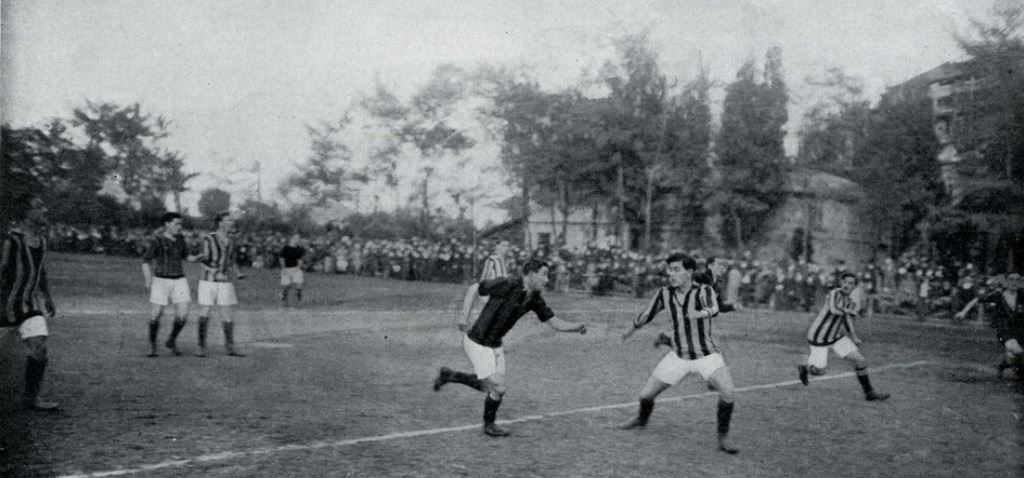
Scene of a Derby della Madonnina in 1915

On 13 December 1899, Herbert Kilpin and others founded the Milan Cricket and Football Club. Alfred Edwards, a former British vice-consul in Milan and a well-known personality of the Milanese high society, was the club's first elected president. Initially, the team included a cricket section, managed by Edward Berra, and a football section managed by David Allison. The Milan team soon gained relevant notability under Herbert Kilpin's guide. The first trophy to be won was the Medaglia del Re ("King's Medal") in January 1900, and the team later won three national leagues, in 1901, 1906 and 1907. The triumph of 1901 was particularly relevant because it ended the consecutive series of wins of Genoa, which had been the only team to have won the title prior to 1901. On 9 March 1908, issues over the signing of foreign players led to a split and the foundation of Football Club Internazionale.

The first derby match between the two Milanese rivals was held in the final of the Chiasso Cup of 1908, a football tournament played in Canton Ticino, Switzerland, on 18 October of that year; the Rossoneri won 2–1. While Inter and Milan faced each other sporadically in the early years, the rivalry has been renewed annually since the inaugural 1926–27 season of the Divisione Nazionale, the first truly national Italian league. The two teams have played each other at least twice a year since then.

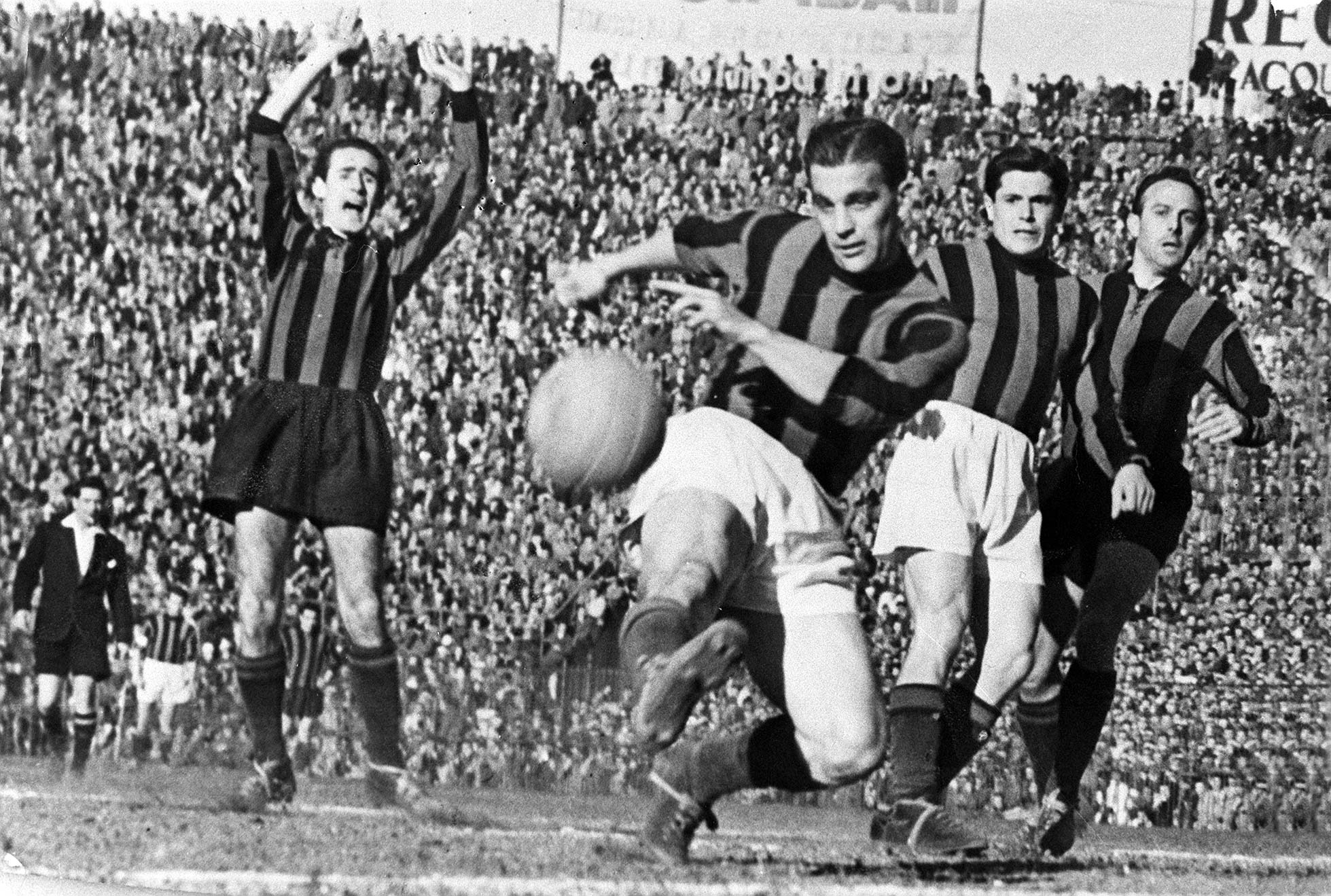
Gunnar Nordahl scoring a goal in a Milan derby on 25 March 1951

Inter won the first Serie A title in 1929-1930, in the first edition of the Italian Football Championship (the third league title for the club after 1910 and 1920). Inter won again in 1938 and 1940 with one of the greatest players of all time Giuseppe Meazza who held the title of top scorer in the Milan derbies until 2005. Between 1928 and 1938 there were 10 victories for Inter, 7 draws and none for AC Milan, the longest period without a win in the history of Derby.

In 1951 Milan finally win the first Serie A, and the first league title since 1907 after 44 years.

In the 1960s, the Milan derby saw two big stars of Italian football come face-to-face. One of the most representative players of Inter was Sandro Mazzola, the son of former Torino player Valentino Mazzola who, along with most of his Torino teammates, died in the 1949 Superga air disaster after dominating Serie A for four seasons. His Milan counterpart was Gianni Rivera, nicknamed "Golden Boy" for his talent. This era saw brilliant derby matches and an increasing rivalry: while Milan won the European Cup in 1962–63, Inter with one of the best teams in Italian football history followed with back-to-back success in 1964 and 1965 and with two consecutive Intercontinetal Cup win and with others two European Cup finals played in 1967 and 1972. Milan again won the title in 1968–69. During this successful period for both teams, Milan were coached by Nereo Rocco and Inter by Helenio Herrera, both coaching many notable players. The rivalry continued on the Italy national team, where two players from their respective clubs would often not play together, with one usually being substituted by the other at half-time. Rivera ended up losing the starting line-up to Mazzola in the 1970 final against Brazil, in which Italy was defeated 1–4 by the South Americans. He would later enter in the 84th minute after Italy were already far behind.

The derby did not take place in 1980-1981 and 1982-1983 in Serie A, due to AC Milan's double relegation to Serie B. Arguably Milan's greatest-ever era took place during the late 1980s and had extended through to the mid-2000s. Often hailed as the greatest-ever Milan side, the team stemming from the 1989 European champions managed by Arrigo Sacchi, contained legendary Milan players, Marco van Basten, Ruud Gullit, Frank Rijkaard and Paolo Maldini, amongst others. Milan's dominance, both domestically and internationally, had seen them capture four league titles and three European Cups (finishing runners-up two additional times) between 1989 and 1998. During this time, Inter win 1988–89 Serie A title with an all-time record points in Serie A history with 18 teams under Giovanni Trapattoni and with great players like Lothar Matthäus and Andreas Brehme (with Milan ending only third), and also Inter had gone on to finish runners-up in the 1992–93 season (behind Milan) and in a controversial 1997–98 season (with Milan that ended 10th) and won three UEFA Cups out of four finals played.

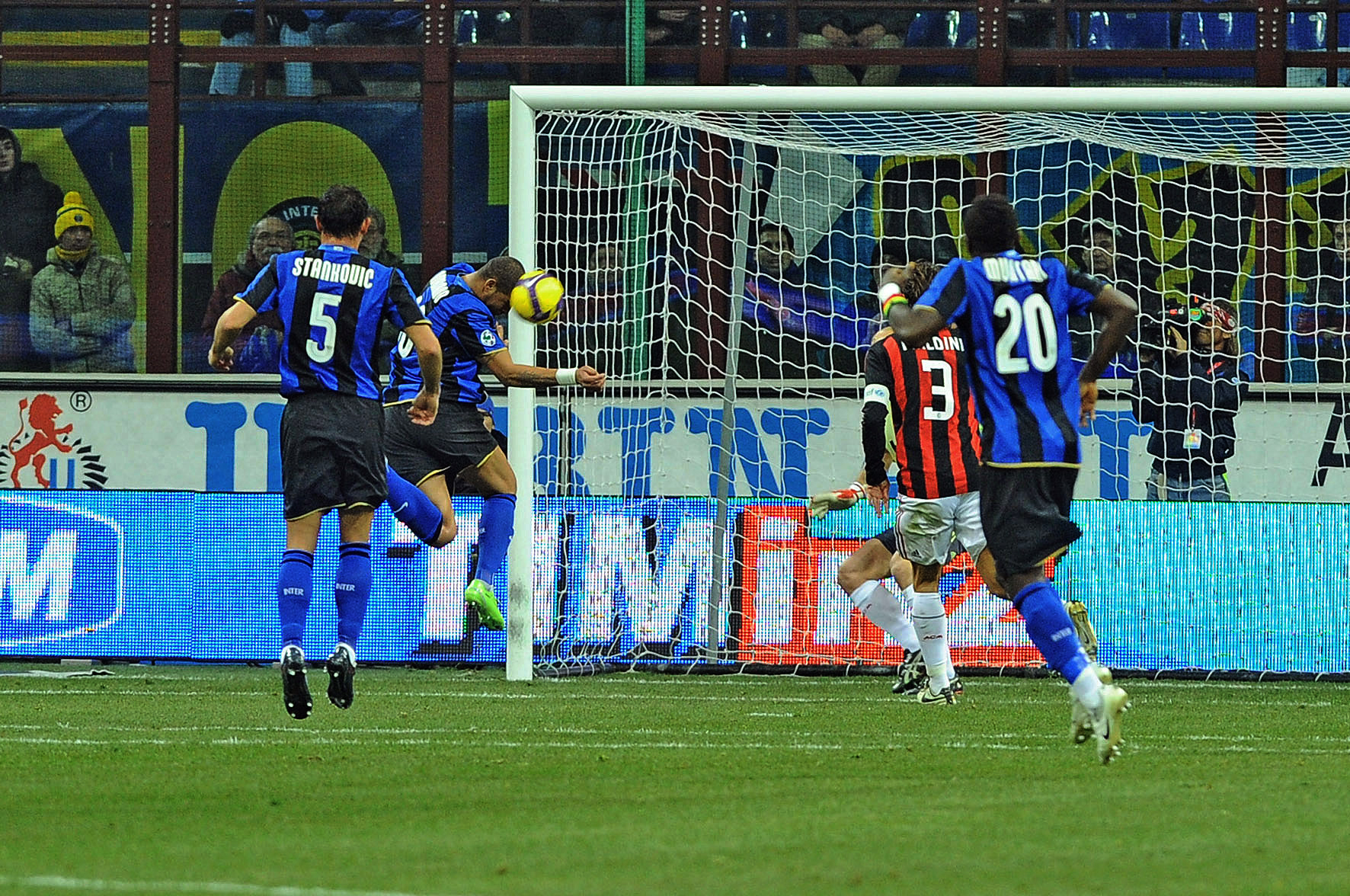
Adriano heading a goal in a Milan derby on 15 February 2009

The two clubs famously met in the semi-finals of the 2002–03 UEFA Champions League, their first ever European matches against one another, in which Milan went through on the away goals rule despite both clubs playing at the same stadium; Milan would go on to win the competition. They met again in the quarter-finals of the 2004–05 edition; Milan triumphed on aggregate after UEFA awarded them a 3–0 victory in the second leg, as the match was abandoned due to flares thrown by Inter fans.

Inter's long wait for a league title that began after 1989 finally arrived in 2006, when the Calciopoli scandal stripped Juventus of the 2005–06 title (as well as deducting points from Milan's final overall total) and handed it to Inter, who originally finished third behind both Juventus and Milan. This was seen as a controversial decision by many, as even though the title won the previous season by Juventus was also stripped, it was left unawarded, which many felt should have also been the case with the 2005–06 title. Inter went on to win the 2006–07 Serie A title as well in a season that saw Juventus relegated from the top flight, and Milan, as punishment, starting the season with negative points. Inter's triumphant campaign included a record-breaking run of 17 consecutive victories and victories in both fixtures against Milan. During the same season, however, Milan had captured their seventh European Cup/UEFA Champions League, defeating Liverpool in the final in Athens. As the Italian league recovered from the aftermath of the match-fixing scandal, Inter continued to dominate, winning each league up until the 2009–10 season in which they secured the title on the last day of the season. That season had also seen Inter become the first Italian side to win a treble. In addition to their league title, Inter also secured the Coppa Italia and their first Champions League title since 1965. The following season, however, Milan, with the acquisition of several players that included former Inter striker Zlatan Ibrahimović, recaptured the Scudetto, their 18th overall, leading the league standings from as early as November until the end of the season. That season also saw Milan win both derby matches, keeping clean sheets in both fixtures.

Between 2011–12 and 2019–20, both Milan teams lagged behind Juventus in Serie A, with a disappointing ninth-place finish for Inter in 2012–13 and a difficult campaign for Milan in 2014–15, finishing tenth. However, Inter ended Juventus' nine-year streak by winning their 19th title in 2020–21, overtaking Milan's total. Milan tied Inter's total by winning their own 19th title in the following season. In January 2023 Inter won 2022 Supercoppa Italiana defeating Milan 3-0 in Riad final.

The two clubs met once again in the semi-finals of the 2022–23 UEFA Champions League; the tie was their first European derby in 18 years, as well as being both clubs' first appearances in the semi-finals since winning the trophy in 2007 and 2010 respectively. Inter won the tie, defeating Milan 2–0 in the first leg and 1–0 in the second, reaching the final.

In 2023–24, Inter defeated Milan 2–1 as the designated "away" side on 22 April 2024; the result confirmed they had won their 20th league title, marking the first time the Scudetto had been decided in a Derby della Madonnina. The title put Inter one clear of Milan's 19 titles, and ensured a second star on the club's badge; the game was also Inter's sixth successive win over Milan, the joint-longest winning streak of either side the derby's history. Milan got revenge on Inter by winning the derby matchup in the 2024–25 Supercoppa Italiana in a 3–2 comeback victory.

The 2025–26 season saw Milan claim a league double over Inter for the first time since the 2010–11 season, however Inter would go on to claim a domestic double by winning their 21st league title and 10th Coppa Italia whilst Milan finished fifth and missed out on Champions League qualification for the second consecutive season.

== Official match results ==
- SF = Semi-finals
- QF = Quarter-finals
- R16 = Round of 16
- R32 = Round of 32
- GS = Group stage
- R1 = Round 1
- R2 = Round 2

Milan win Draw Inter win

Season	Competition	Date	Home team	Result	Away team
1909	Prima Categoria	10 January 1909	Milan	3–2	Inter
1909–10	Prima Categoria	6 February 1910	Milan	0–5	Inter
1909–10	Prima Categoria	27 February 1910	Inter	5–1	Milan
1910–11	Prima Categoria	5 February 1911	Inter	0–2	Milan
1910–11	Prima Categoria	30 April 1911	Milan	6–3	Inter
1911–12	Prima Categoria	5 November 1911	Milan	2–1	Inter
1911–12	Prima Categoria	21 January 1912	Inter	0–3	Milan
1912–13	Prima Categoria	17 November 1912	Inter	1–2	Milan
1912–13	Prima Categoria	9 February 1913	Milan	1–0	Inter
1913–14	Prima Categoria	30 November 1913	Milan	0–1	Inter
1913–14	Prima Categoria	22 February 1914	Inter	5–2	Milan
1914–15	Prima Categoria	2 May 1915	Inter	3–1	Milan
1920–21	Prima Categoria	19 December 1920	Inter	0–0	Milan
1920–21	Prima Categoria	30 January 1921	Milan	1–1	Inter
1926–27	Divisione Nazionale	3 April 1927	Inter	1–2	Milan
1926–27	Divisione Nazionale	5 June 1927	Milan	1–1	Inter
1927–28	Divisione Nazionale	29 April 1928	Milan	1–2	Inter
1927–28	Divisione Nazionale	8 July 1928	Inter	2–3	Milan
1929–30	Serie A	10 November 1929	Milan	1–2	Inter
1929–30	Serie A	13 April 1930	Inter	2–0	Milan
1930–31	Serie A	26 October 1930	Inter	1–1	Milan
1930–31	Serie A	19 March 1931	Milan	1–4	Inter
1931–32	Serie A	18 October 1931	Milan	2–3	Inter
1931–32	Serie A	6 March 1932	Inter	0–0	Milan
1932–33	Serie A	6 November 1932	Inter	5–4	Milan
1932–33	Serie A	9 April 1933	Milan	1–3	Inter
1933–34	Serie A	1 November 1933	Inter	3–0	Milan
1933–34	Serie A	11 March 1934	Milan	1–2	Inter
1934–35	Serie A	2 December 1934	Milan	2–2	Inter
1934–35	Serie A	14 April 1935	Inter	2–0	Milan
1935–36	Serie A	29 September 1935	Inter	1–1	Milan
1935–36	Serie A	2 February 1936	Milan	2–2	Inter
1936–37	Serie A	4 October 1936	Milan	1–1	Inter
1936–37	Serie A	7 February 1937	Inter	1–1	Milan
1937–38	Serie A	17 October 1937	Inter	2–1	Milan
1937–38	Serie A	20 February 1938	Milan	1–0	Inter
1938–39	Serie A	2 October 1938	Inter	1–0	Milan
1938–39	Serie A	12 February 1939	Milan	3–1	Inter
1939–40	Serie A	17 December 1939	Inter	0–3	Milan
1939–40	Serie A	12 May 1940	Milan	1–3	Inter
1940–41	Serie A	20 October 1940	Milan	0–1	Inter
1940–41	Serie A	9 February 1941	Inter	2–2	Milan
1941–42	Serie A	25 January 1942	Milan	2–1	Inter
1941–42	Serie A	7 June 1942	Inter	2–2	Milan
1942–43	Serie A	3 January 1943	Inter	3–1	Milan
1942–43	Serie A	18 April 1943	Milan	0–3	Inter
1944	Campionato Alta Italia	23 January 1944	Inter	3–1	Milan
1944	Campionato Alta Italia	19 March 1944	Milan	2–0	Inter
1945–46	Divisione Nazionale	4 November 1945	Milan	1–3	Inter
1945–46	Divisione Nazionale	10 February 1946	Inter	2–0	Milan
1945–46	Divisione Nazionale	30 May 1946	Milan	3–2	Inter
1945–46	Divisione Nazionale	21 July 1946	Inter	0–1	Milan
1946–47	Serie A	20 October 1946	Milan	3–1	Inter
1946–47	Serie A	16 March 1947	Inter	1–2	Milan
1947–48	Serie A	2 November 1947	Milan	3–2	Inter
1947–48	Serie A	11 April 1948	Inter	0–2	Milan
1948–49	Serie A	16 October 1948	Milan	0–2	Inter
1948–49	Serie A	6 February 1949	Inter	4–4	Milan
1949–50	Serie A	6 November 1949	Inter	6–5	Milan
1949–50	Serie A	19 March 1950	Milan	3–1	Inter
1950–51	Serie A	12 November 1950	Milan	2–3	Inter
1950–51	Serie A	25 March 1951	Inter	0–1	Milan
1951–52	Serie A	4 November 1951	Inter	2–2	Milan
1951–52	Serie A	6 April 1952	Milan	2–1	Inter
1952–53	Serie A	2 November 1952	Milan	0–1	Inter
1952–53	Serie A	8 March 1953	Inter	0–0	Milan
1953–54	Serie A	1 November 1953	Inter	3–0	Milan
1953–54	Serie A	21 March 1954	Milan	2–0	Inter
1954–55	Serie A	7 November 1954	Milan	1–1	Inter
1954–55	Serie A	3 April 1955	Inter	1–1	Milan
1955–56	Serie A	16 October 1955	Inter	2–1	Milan
1955–56	Serie A	11 March 1956	Milan	1–2	Inter
1956–57	Serie A	21 October 1956	Milan	1–1	Inter
1956–57	Serie A	10 March 1957	Inter	1–1	Milan
1957–58	Serie A	6 October 1957	Inter	1–0	Milan
1957–58	Serie A	23 February 1958	Milan	2–2	Inter
1957–58	Coppa Italia GS	16 June 1958	Milan	3–2	Inter
1957–58	Coppa Italia GS	6 July 1958	Inter	1–1	Milan
1958–59	Serie A	2 November 1958	Milan	1–1	Inter
1958–59	Serie A	22 March 1959	Inter	1–0	Milan
1959–60	Serie A	8 November 1959	Inter	0–0	Milan
1959–60	Serie A	27 March 1960	Milan	5–3	Inter
1960–61	Serie A	20 November 1960	Milan	0–1	Inter
1960–61	Serie A	26 March 1961	Inter	1–2	Milan
1961–62	Serie A	1 October 1961	Inter	1–3	Milan
1961–62	Serie A	4 February 1962	Milan	0–2	Inter
1962–63	Serie A	21 October 1962	Milan	1–1	Inter
1962–63	Serie A	24 February 1963	Inter	1–1	Milan
1963–64	Serie A	19 January 1964	Inter	0–2	Milan
1963–64	Serie A	22 March 1964	Milan	1–1	Inter
1964–65	Serie A	15 November 1964	Milan	3–0	Inter
1964–65	Serie A	28 March 1965	Inter	5–2	Milan
1965–66	Serie A	21 November 1965	Inter	1–1	Milan
1965–66	Serie A	3 April 1966	Milan	1–2	Inter
1966–67	Serie A	20 November 1966	Milan	0–1	Inter
1966–67	Serie A	2 April 1967	Inter	4–0	Milan
1967–68	Serie A	22 October 1967	Inter	1–1	Milan
1967–68	Serie A	18 February 1968	Milan	1–1	Inter
1967–68	Coppa Italia Final Group	16 June 1968	Inter	0–0	Milan
1967–68	Coppa Italia Final Group	26 June 1968	Milan	4–2	Inter
1968–69	Serie A	3 November 1968	Milan	1–0	Inter
1968–69	Serie A	2 March 1969	Inter	1–1	Milan
1969–70	Serie A	9 November 1969	Inter	0–0	Milan
1969–70	Serie A	8 March 1970	Milan	0–1	Inter
1970–71	Serie A	8 November 1970	Milan	3–0	Inter
1970–71	Serie A	7 March 1971	Inter	2–0	Milan
1971–72	Serie A	28 November 1971	Inter	2–3	Milan
1971–72	Serie A	19 March 1972	Milan	1–1	Inter
1971–72	Coppa Italia R2	8 June 1972	Milan	1–0	Inter
1971–72	Coppa Italia R2	28 June 1972	Inter	0–1	Milan
1972–73	Serie A	19 November 1972	Milan	3–2	Inter
1972–73	Serie A	18 March 1973	Inter	0–2	Milan
1973–74	Serie A	2 December 1973	Inter	2–1	Milan
1973–74	Coppa Italia R2	23 January 1974	Milan	0–1	Inter
1973–74	Serie A	24 March 1974	Milan	1–5	Inter
1973–74	Coppa Italia R2	1 May 1974	Inter	2–1	Milan
1974–75	Serie A	10 November 1974	Inter	0–0	Milan
1974–75	Serie A	9 March 1975	Milan	3–0	Inter
1974–75	Coppa Italia R2	16 May 1975	Inter	0–1	Milan
1974–75	Coppa Italia R2	15 June 1975	Milan	0–0	Inter
1975–76	Serie A	7 December 1975	Milan	2–1	Inter
1975–76	Serie A	28 March 1976	Inter	0–1	Milan
1976–77	Serie A	28 November 1976	Milan	1–1	Inter
1976–77	Serie A	27 March 1977	Inter	0–0	Milan
1976–77	Coppa Italia final	3 July 1977	Milan	2–0	Inter
1977–78	Serie A	6 November 1977	Inter	1–3	Milan
1977–78	Serie A	12 March 1978	Milan	0–0	Inter
1978–79	Serie A	12 November 1978	Milan	1–0	Inter
1978–79	Serie A	18 March 1979	Inter	2–2	Milan
1979–80	Serie A	28 October 1979	Inter	2–0	Milan
1979–80	Serie A	2 March 1980	Milan	0–1	Inter
1980–81	Coppa Italia GS	7 September 1980	Milan	0–1	Inter
1981–82	Coppa Italia GS	6 September 1981	Inter	2–2	Milan
1981–82	Serie A	25 October 1981	Milan	0–1	Inter
1981–82	Serie A	7 March 1982	Inter	2–1	Milan
1983–84	Serie A	6 November 1983	Inter	2–0	Milan
1983–84	Serie A	18 March 1984	Milan	0–0	Inter
1984–85	Serie A	28 October 1984	Milan	2–1	Inter
1984–85	Serie A	17 March 1985	Inter	2–2	Milan
1984–85	Coppa Italia SF	23 June 1985	Inter	1–2	Milan
1984–85	Coppa Italia SF	26 June 1985	Milan	1–1	Inter
1985–86	Serie A	1 December 1985	Milan	2–2	Inter
1985–86	Serie A	6 April 1986	Inter	1–0	Milan
1986–87	Serie A	12 October 1986	Milan	0–0	Inter
1986–87	Serie A	1 March 1987	Inter	1–2	Milan
1987–88	Serie A	20 December 1987	Inter	0–1	Milan
1987–88	Serie A	24 April 1988	Milan	2–0	Inter
1988–89	Serie A	11 December 1988	Milan	0–1	Inter
1988–89	Serie A	30 April 1989	Inter	0–0	Milan
1989–90	Serie A	19 November 1989	Inter	0–3	Milan
1989–90	Serie A	18 March 1990	Milan	1–3	Inter
1990–91	Serie A	18 November 1990	Milan	0–1	Inter
1990–91	Serie A	24 March 1991	Inter	0–1	Milan
1991–92	Serie A	1 December 1991	Inter	1–1	Milan
1991–92	Serie A	18 April 1992	Milan	1–0	Inter
1992–93	Serie A	22 November 1992	Milan	1–1	Inter
1992–93	Coppa Italia QF	27 January 1993	Milan	0–0	Inter
1992–93	Coppa Italia QF	10 February 1993	Inter	0–3	Milan
1992–93	Serie A	10 April 1993	Inter	1–1	Milan
1993–94	Serie A	7 November 1993	Inter	1–2	Milan
1993–94	Serie A	20 March 1994	Milan	2–1	Inter
1994–95	Coppa Italia R16	12 October 1994	Milan	1–2	Inter
1994–95	Coppa Italia R16	26 October 1994	Inter	2–1	Milan
1994–95	Serie A	20 November 1994	Milan	1–1	Inter
1994–95	Serie A	15 April 1995	Inter	3–1	Milan
1995–96	Serie A	29 October 1995	Inter	1–1	Milan
1995–96	Serie A	10 March 1996	Milan	0–1	Inter
1996–97	Serie A	24 November 1996	Milan	1–1	Inter
1996–97	Serie A	13 April 1997	Inter	3–1	Milan
1997–98	Serie A	22 November 1997	Inter	2–2	Milan
1997–98	Coppa Italia QF	8 January 1998	Milan	5–0	Inter
1997–98	Coppa Italia QF	21 January 1998	Inter	1–0	Milan
1997–98	Serie A	22 March 1998	Milan	0–3	Inter
1998–99	Serie A	8 November 1998	Milan	2–2	Inter
1998–99	Serie A	13 March 1999	Inter	2–2	Milan
1999–2000	Serie A	24 October 1999	Inter	1–2	Milan
1999–2000	Coppa Italia QF	12 January 2000	Milan	2–3	Inter
1999–2000	Coppa Italia QF	27 January 2000	Inter	1–1	Milan
1999–2000	Serie A	5 March 2000	Milan	1–2	Inter
2000–01	Serie A	7 January 2001	Milan	2–2	Inter
2000–01	Serie A	11 May 2001	Inter	0–6	Milan
2001–02	Serie A	21 October 2001	Inter	2–4	Milan
2001–02	Serie A	3 March 2002	Milan	0–1	Inter
2002–03	Serie A	23 November 2002	Milan	1–0	Inter
2002–03	Serie A	12 April 2003	Inter	0–1	Milan
2002–03	UEFA Champions League SF	7 May 2003	Milan	0–0	Inter
2002–03	UEFA Champions League SF	13 May 2003	Inter	1–1 (Note: Milan won on away goals after tied 1–1 on aggregate.)	Milan
2003–04	Serie A	5 October 2003	Inter	1–3	Milan
2003–04	Serie A	21 February 2004	Milan	3–2	Inter
2004–05	Serie A	24 October 2004	Milan	0–0	Inter
2004–05	Serie A	27 February 2005	Inter	0–1	Milan
2004–05	UEFA Champions League QF	6 April 2005	Milan	2–0	Inter
2004–05	UEFA Champions League QF	12 April 2005	Inter	0–3 (Note: The match was abandoned after 73 minutes with Milan leading 1–0; UEFA awarded a 3–0 win for Milan as Inter fans threw flares onto the pitch.)	Milan
2005–06	Serie A	11 December 2005	Inter	3–2	Milan
2005–06	Serie A	14 April 2006	Milan	1–0	Inter
2006–07	Serie A	28 October 2006	Milan	3–4	Inter
2006–07	Serie A	11 March 2007	Inter	2–1	Milan
2007–08	Serie A	23 December 2007	Inter	2–1	Milan
2007–08	Serie A	4 May 2008	Milan	2–1	Inter
2008–09	Serie A	28 September 2008	Milan	1–0	Inter
2008–09	Serie A	15 February 2009	Inter	2–1	Milan
2009–10	Serie A	29 August 2009	Milan	0–4	Inter
2009–10	Serie A	24 January 2010	Inter	2–0	Milan
2010–11	Serie A	14 November 2010	Inter	0–1	Milan
2010–11	Serie A	2 April 2011	Milan	3–0	Inter
2011–12	Supercoppa Italiana	6 August 2011	Milan	2–1	Inter
2011–12	Serie A	15 January 2012	Milan	0–1	Inter
2011–12	Serie A	6 May 2012	Inter	4–2	Milan
2012–13	Serie A	7 October 2012	Milan	0–1	Inter
2012–13	Serie A	24 February 2013	Inter	1–1	Milan
2013–14	Serie A	22 December 2013	Inter	1–0	Milan
2013–14	Serie A	4 May 2014	Milan	1–0	Inter
2014–15	Serie A	23 November 2014	Milan	1–1	Inter
2014–15	Serie A	19 April 2015	Inter	0–0	Milan
2015–16	Serie A	13 September 2015	Inter	1–0	Milan
2015–16	Serie A	31 January 2016	Milan	3–0	Inter
2016–17	Serie A	20 November 2016	Milan	2–2	Inter
2016–17	Serie A	15 April 2017	Inter	2–2	Milan
2017–18	Serie A	15 October 2017	Inter	3–2	Milan
2017–18	Coppa Italia QF	27 December 2017	Milan	1–0 (Note: After extra time)	Inter
2017–18	Serie A	4 April 2018	Milan	0–0	Inter
2018–19	Serie A	21 October 2018	Inter	1–0	Milan
2018–19	Serie A	17 March 2019	Milan	2–3	Inter
2019–20	Serie A	21 September 2019	Milan	0–2	Inter
2019–20	Serie A	9 February 2020	Inter	4–2	Milan
2020–21	Serie A	17 October 2020	Inter	1–2	Milan
2020–21	Coppa Italia QF	26 January 2021	Inter	2–1	Milan
2020–21	Serie A	21 February 2021	Milan	0–3	Inter
2021–22	Serie A	7 November 2021	Milan	1–1	Inter
2021–22	Serie A	5 February 2022	Inter	1–2	Milan
2021–22	Coppa Italia SF	1 March 2022	Milan	0–0	Inter
2021–22	Coppa Italia SF	19 April 2022	Inter	3–0	Milan
2022–23	Serie A	3 September 2022	Milan	3–2	Inter
2022–23	Supercoppa Italiana	18 January 2023	Milan	0–3	Inter
2022–23	Serie A	5 February 2023	Inter	1–0	Milan
2022–23	UEFA Champions League SF	10 May 2023	Milan	0–2	Inter
2022–23	UEFA Champions League SF	16 May 2023	Inter	1–0	Milan
2023–24	Serie A	16 September 2023	Inter	5–1	Milan
2023–24	Serie A	22 April 2024	Milan	1–2	Inter
2024–25	Serie A	22 September 2024	Inter	1–2	Milan
2024–25	Supercoppa Italiana final	6 January 2025	Inter	2–3	Milan
2024–25	Serie A	2 February 2025	Milan	1–1	Inter
2024–25	Coppa Italia SF	2 April 2025	Milan	1–1	Inter
2024–25	Coppa Italia SF	23 April 2025	Inter	0–3	Milan
2025–26	Serie A	23 November 2025	Inter	0–1	Milan
2025–26	Serie A	8 March 2026	Milan	1–0	Inter
2026–27	Serie A	31 October 2026	Milan	3–1	Inter
2026–27	Serie A	14 February 2027	Inter		Milan

== Statistics ==
As of 31 October 2026

Competition	Total matches played	Inter wins	Draws	Milan wins	Inter goals	Milan goals
Prima Categoria	14	5	2	7	27	24
Divisione Nazionale	8	3	1	4	13	12
Serie A	185	70	57	58	261	239
Total (league)	207	78	60	69	301	275
Campionato Alta Italia	2	1	0	1	3	3
Coppa Italia	29	9	9	11	28	38
Supercoppa Italiana	3	1	0	2	6	5
UEFA Champions League	6	2	2	2	4	6
Total (official)	247	91	71	85	342	327

=== Top scorers ===
As of 31 October 2026

Below is the list of players with the most goals scored in official games.

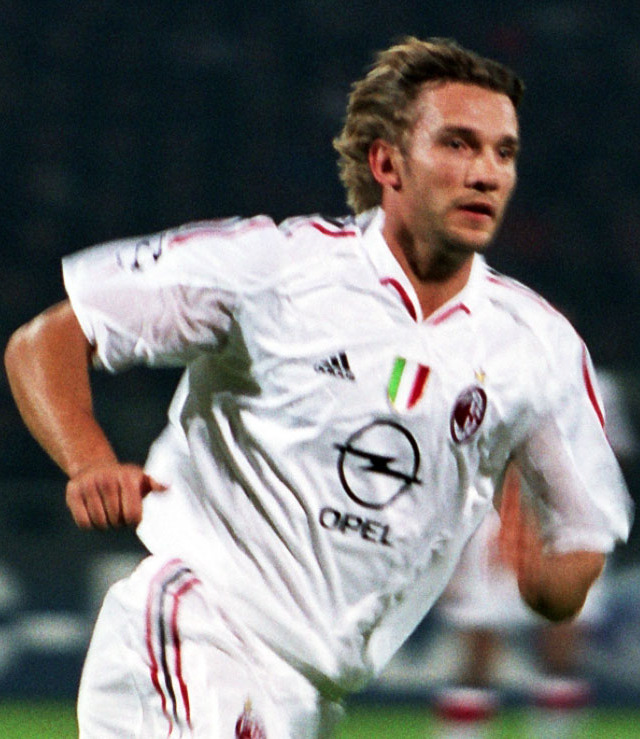
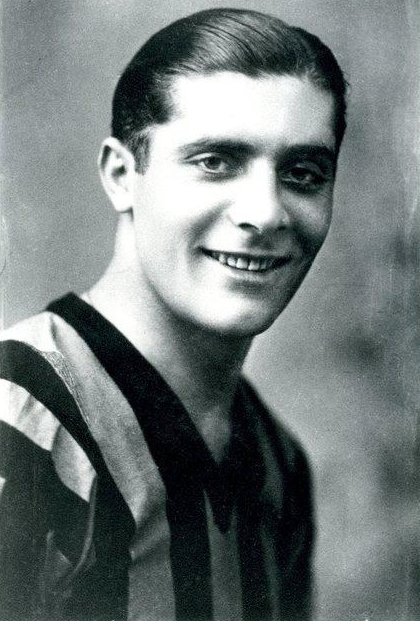
The Rossonero Andriy Shevchenko, the top scorer of the Milan derby (14), and Giuseppe Meazza, the highest scorer of the Nerazzurri (12)

Rank	Player	Team(s) (goals)	Goals
1	(Ukraine) Andriy Shevchenko	Milan	14
2	(Italy) Giuseppe Meazza	Inter (12); Milan (1)	13
3	(Sweden) Gunnar Nordahl	Milan	11
3	(Hungary) István Nyers	Inter	11
5	(Sweden) Zlatan Ibrahimović	Inter (2); Milan (8)	10
5	(Italy) Enrico Candiani	Inter (7); Milan (3)	10
7	(Argentina) Lautaro Martínez	Inter	9
8	(Italy) Benito Lorenzi	Inter	8
9	(Brazil) (Italy) José Altafini	Milan	7
9	(Italy) Alessandro Altobelli	Inter	7
9	(Italy) Roberto Boninsegna	Inter	7
9	(Belgium) Louis Van Hege	Milan	7

=== Most appearances ===
As of 31 October 2026

Below is the list of players with the most appearances in official games.

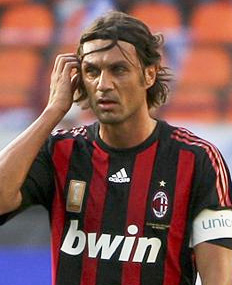
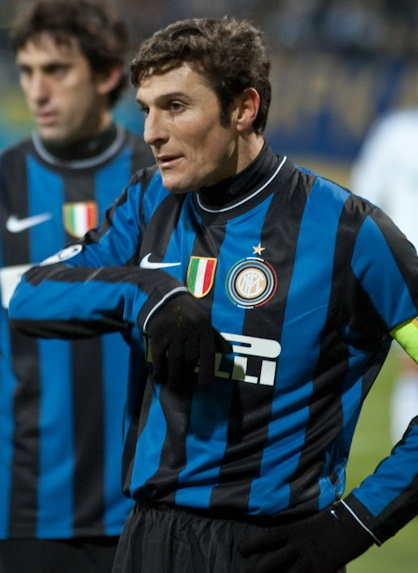
The Rossonero Paolo Maldini, the record appearance-maker of the Milan derby (53) and Javier Zanetti, the record appearance-maker of the Nerazzurri (45)

Rank	Player	Team(s) (apps)	Apps
1	(Italy) Paolo Maldini	Milan	53
2	(Argentina) Javier Zanetti	Inter	45
3	(Italy) Giuseppe Bergomi	Inter	40
3	(Italy) Alessandro Costacurta	Milan	40
5	(Italy) Gianni Rivera	Milan	38
6	(Italy) Giacinto Facchetti	Inter	37
6	(Italy) Sandro Mazzola	Inter	37
8	(Italy) Franco Baresi	Milan	35
9	(Italy) Mauro Tassotti	Milan	31
10	(Italy) Tarcisio Burgnich	Inter	30
10	(Italy) Mario Corso	Inter	30
10	(Netherlands) Clarence Seedorf	Inter (7); Milan (23)	30

=== Managers ===
==== Appearances ====
As of 31 October 2026

Below is the list of managers with the most appearances in official games.

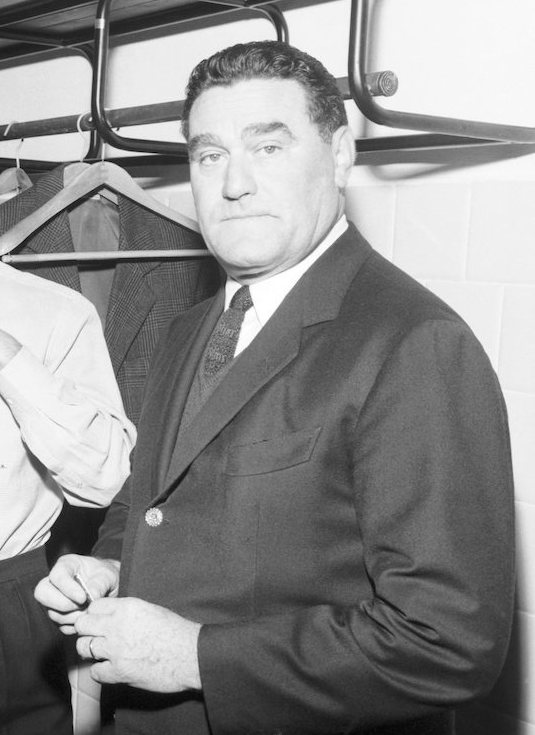
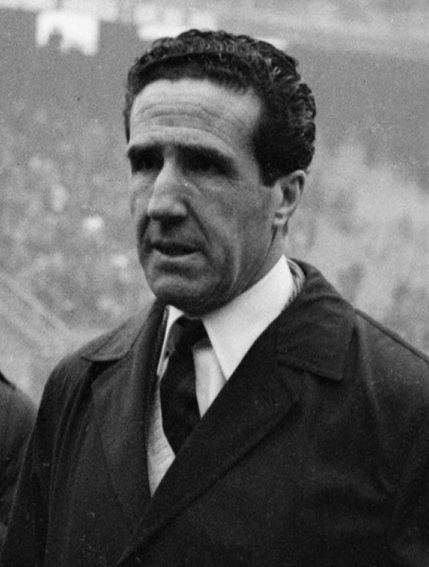
The Rossonero Nereo Rocco, the record appearance-maker of the derby della Madonnina (25) and Helenio Herrera, the record appearance-maker of the Nerazzurri (18)

Rank	Manager	Team(s) (apps)	Apps
1	(Italy) Nereo Rocco	Milan	25
2	(Italy) Giuseppe Viani	Milan	20
3	(Italy) Carlo Ancelotti	Milan	19
4	(Italy) Fabio Capello	Milan	18
4	(Argentina) Helenio Herrera	Inter	18
6	(Italy) Stefano Pioli	Inter (2); Milan (15)	17
7	(Italy) Simone Inzaghi	Inter	16
7	(Sweden) Nils Liedholm	Milan	16
9	(Italy) Roberto Mancini	Inter	14
10	(Italy) Giovanni Trapattoni	Milan (3); Inter (10)	13

=== Records ===
- Most goals in a single derby: 11, Internazionale 6–5 Milan (6 November 1949)
- Largest derby margin of victory for Milan: 0–6 (11 May 2001)
- Largest derby margin of victory for Internazionale: 0–5 (6 February 1910)
- Most derby wins in a row: 6, Milan (5 February 1911 – 9 February 1913, 30 May 1946 – 11 April 1948), Inter (18 January 2023 – 22 April 2024)
- Most consecutive derby draws: 4 (from 29 September 1935 to 7 February 1937)
- Most consecutive derby matches without a win: 17, Milan (from 10 November 1929 to 7 February 1937)
- Most goals in consecutive derbies for a player: 5, Romelu Lukaku (from 21 September 2019 to 21 February 2021)
- Fastest derby goal scored for Internazionale: Sandro Mazzola, after 13 seconds (24 February 1963)
- Fastest derby goal scored for Milan: José Altafini, after 25 seconds (26 March 1961)
- Most goals in a single derby for a Milan player: 4, José Altafini (27 March 1960)
- Most goals in a single derby for an Internazionale player: 3, Giovanni Capra (6 February 1910), Amedeo Amadei (6 November 1949), István Nyers (1 November 1953), Diego Milito (6 May 2012) and Mauro Icardi (15 October 2017)
- Most derbies played in a calendar year: 5 (2023, 2025)
- Youngest goalscorer in a derby: Edoardo Mariani (27 February 1910, aged 16 years and 359 days)
- Oldest goalscorer in a derby: Zlatan Ibrahimović (26 January 2021, aged 39 years and 115 days)

==== Most goals in a match ====
- 11 goals on 6 November 1949, Inter 6–5 Milan
- 9 goals on 30 April 1911, Milan 6–3 Inter
- 9 goals on 6 November 1932, Inter 5–4 Milan
- 8 goals on 6 February 1949, Inter 4–4 Milan
- 8 goals on 27 March 1960, Milan 5–3 Inter
- 7 goals on 22 February 1914, Inter 5–2 Milan
- 7 goals on 28 March 1965, Inter 5–2 Milan
- 7 goals on 28 October 2006, Milan 3–4 Inter

==== Biggest wins (4+ goals) ====
Winning margin	Result	Date	Competition
6	Inter 0–6 Milan	11 May 2001	Serie A
5	Milan 0–5 Inter	6 February 1910	Prima Categoria
5	Milan 5–0 Inter	8 January 1998	Coppa Italia
4	Inter 5–1 Milan	27 February 1910	Prima Categoria
4	Milan 1–5 Inter	24 March 1974	Serie A
4	Inter 5–1 Milan	16 September 2023	Serie A
4	Inter 4–0 Milan	2 April 1967	Serie A
4	Milan 0–4 Inter	29 August 2009	Serie A

== Head-to-head ranking in Serie A (1930–2026) ==
P.	30	31	32	33	34	35	36	37	38	39	40	41	42	43	47	48	49	50	51	52	53	54	55	56	57	58	59	60	61	62	63	64	65	66	67	68	69	70	71	72	73	74	75	76	77	78	79	80	81	82	83	84	85	86	87	88	89	90	91	92	93	94	95	96	97	98	99	00	01	02	03	04	05	06	07	08	09	10	11	12	13	14	15	16	17	18	19	20	21	22	23	24	25	26
1	1								1		1								1		1	1	1		1		1			1	1		1	1		1			1								1	1								1	1			1	1	1		1			1					1		1	1	1	1	1	1										1	1		1		1
2				2	2	2						2				2	2	2	2	2				2					2	2		2	2		2			2	2	2	2																	2	2		2					2					2		2						2	2								2	2	2		2	2	
3									3	3		3					3	3		3	3	3		3			3	3	3		3	3					3							3							3		3		3		3	3	3						3			3		3	3		3	3			3	3			3										3			
4			4				4	4						4	4													4									4	4				4		4	4	4	4		4			4											4					4		4		4			4									4		4	4				4			
5		5																							5											5				5	5		5			5				5			5		5	5													5							5						5					5							5
6			6											6																																						6		6									6						6											6					6	6		6						
7								7																										7								7												7										7																				7	7									
8							8				8												8												8																									8							8															8	8										8	
9					9					9																9																	9																																						9													
10						10							10		10																														10																					10																	10											
11	11			11																																																													11																													
12		12											12			12																																																																														
13																																																														13																																
14																																																		14																																												
15																																																15																																														
16																																																																																														
17																																																																																														
18																																																																																														
19																																																																																														
20																																																																																														

• Milan with 40 higher finishes, Inter with 51 higher finishes, and 1 equal finish (as of the end of the 2025–26 season). No head-to-heads in 1981 and 1983, since Milan was in Serie B.

Notes:

- 1945–46 Italian Football Championship is not included in Serie A statistics.
- Both teams finished with the same number of points in 1958, and the regulation of the time did not contemplate tiebreakers: both teams finished in ninth place.
- Both teams finished with the same number of points in 1991, but Milan had better goal difference: Milan finished in second place, Inter in third.

== Players who played for both clubs ==
Note: Senior club appearances and goals counted for the domestic league only. Player names in bold are still active for one of the two clubs. Updated per 31 October 2026.

=== Inter, then Milan ===
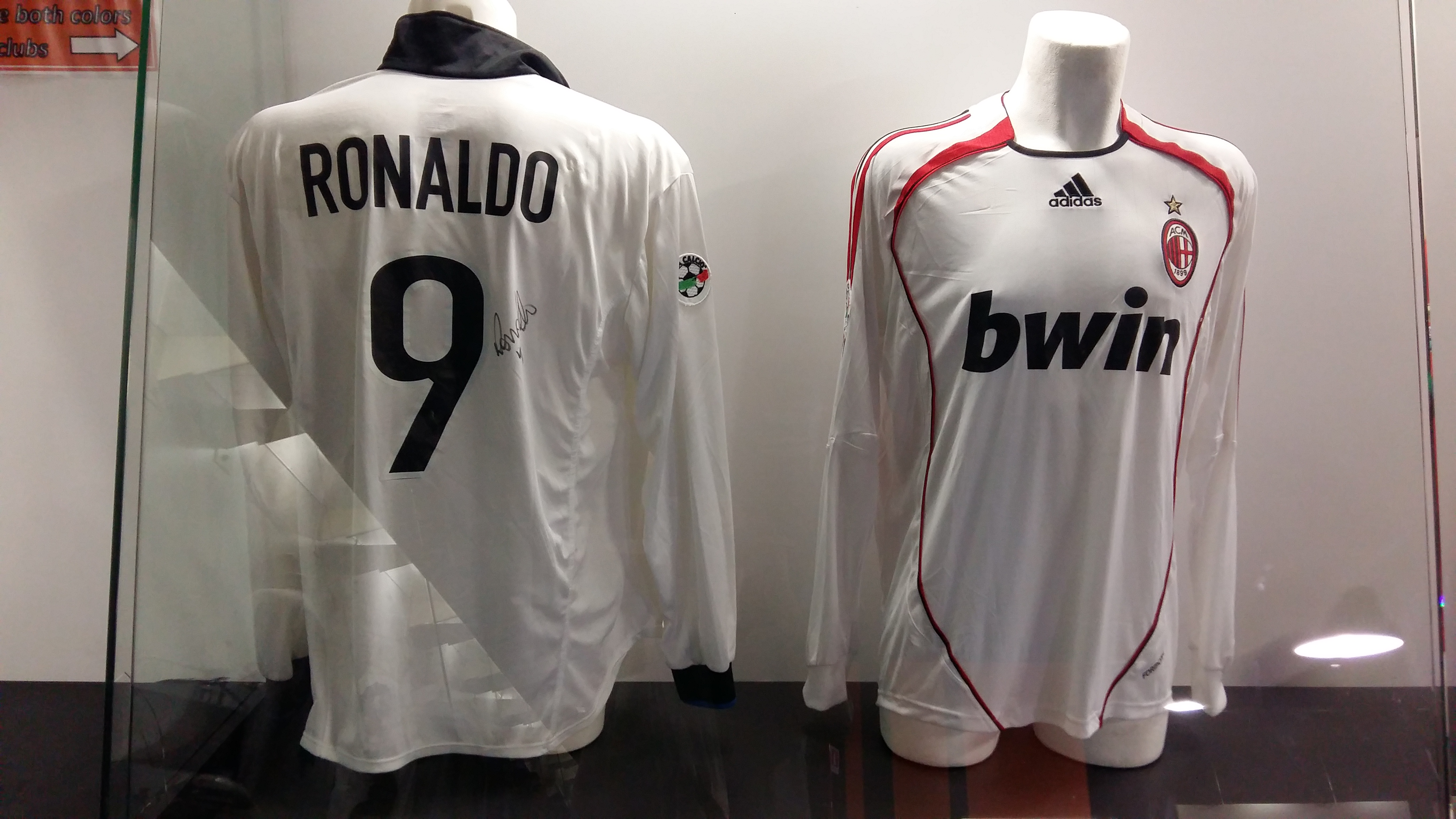
Ronaldo's Inter Milan away jersey (left) and AC Milan away jersey (right) in the San Siro museum. He played for Inter from 1997 to 2002, and AC Milan from 2007 to 2008.

Player	Pos.	Inter			Milan		
Player	Pos.	Tenure	Apps	Goals	Tenure	Apps	Goals
(Italy) Mario Cevenini	DF	1915–1916	3	0	1916–1919	4	2
(Italy) Mario Cevenini	DF	1919–1921	36	1	1916–1919	4	2
(Italy) Pietro Bronzini	FW	1915–1916	?	?	1916–1917	4	0
(Italy) Pietro Bronzini	FW	1915–1916	?	?	1919–1926	139	5
(Italy) Eugenio Negri	MF	1918–1919	0	0	1919–1920	1	0
(Italy) Luigi Binda	GK	1912–1913	0	0	1919–1922	48	0
(Italy) Luigi Binda	GK	1912–1913	0	0	1923–1925	2	0
(Italy) Antonio Da Sacco	DF	1920–1922	36	0	1923–1925	14	0
(Italy) Antonio Da Sacco	DF	1931–1932	0	0	1923–1925	14	0
(Italy) Guglielmo Tornabuoni	MF	1924–1925	11	3	1925	0	0
(Italy) Guglielmo Tornabuoni	MF	1925	8	3	1925	0	0
(Italy) Guglielmo Tornabuoni	MF	1925–1926	10	1	1925	0	0
(Italy) Orlando Bocchi	MF	1925–1926	?	?	1930–1932	35	2
(Italy) Enrico Rivolta	MF	1922–1933	265	54	1936–1937	0	0
(Italy) Renato De Manzano	MF	1933–1934	14	2	1936–1937	11	0
(Italy) Elpidio Coppa	MF	1932–1934	1	0	1938–1939	11	2
(Italy) Carlo Villa	MF	1936–1937	23	1	1944–1945	14	0
(Italy) Umberto Guarnieri	FW	1938–1942	52	25	1944–1945	20	6
(Italy) Pietro Rebuzzi	MF	1939–1941	11	5	1944–1945	2	0
(Italy) Pietro Rebuzzi	MF	1942–1944	11	6	1944–1945	2	0
(Italy) Giuseppe Meazza	FW	1927–1940	348	241	1940–1942	37	9
(Italy) Giuseppe Meazza	FW	1946–1947	17	2	1940–1942	37	9
(Italy) Celso Battaia	DF	1938–1940	4	0	1946–1947	13	0
(Italy) Celso Battaia	DF	1941–1943	29	0	1946–1947	13	0
(Italy) Celso Battaia	DF	1943–1944	11	0	1946–1947	13	0
(Italy) Celso Battaia	DF	1944–1945	12	0	1946–1947	13	0
(Italy) Enrico Candiani	MF	1937–1946	187	71	1949–1950	22	8
(Italy) Narciso Soldan	GK	1949–1951	42	0	1956–1959	36	0
(Italy) Giorgio Ghezzi	GK	1951–1958	186	0	1959–1965	123	0
(Italy) Gino Pivatelli	FW	1947–1949	–	–	1961–1963	37	11
(Italy) Saul Malatrasi	DF	1964–1966	22	0	1967–1970	67	0
(Argentina) Antonio Angelillo	FW	1957–1961	113	68	1965–1966	11	1
(Argentina) Antonio Angelillo	FW	1957–1961	113	68	1967–1968	3	1
(Italy) Aldo Bet	DF	1967–1968	8	0	1974–1981	144	0
(Italy) Egidio Calloni	FW	1968–1970	0	0	1974–1978	101	31
(Italy) Massimo Silva	FW	1968–1971	0	0	1976–1977	20	4
(Italy) Giorgio Morini	MF	1967–1968	0	0	1976–1981	75	4
(Italy) Oscar Damiani	DF	1968–1969	0	0	1982–1984	55	17
(Italy) Adelio Moro	MF	1972–1975	61	9	1981–1982	19	1
(Italy) Tiziano Manfrin	MF	1973–1974	0	0	1982–1983	17	0
(Italy) Nazzareno Canuti	DF	1974–1982	130	1	1982–1983	35	0
(Italy) Giancarlo Pasinato	MF	1978–1982	96	6	1982–1983	33	7
(Italy) Giancarlo Pasinato	MF	1983–1985	35	2	1982–1983	33	7
(Italy) Aldo Serena	FW	1978–1981	2	1	1982–1983	20	8
(Italy) Aldo Serena	FW	1981–1983	21	2	1982–1983	20	8
(Italy) Aldo Serena	FW	1983–1985	28	8	1982–1983	20	8
(Italy) Aldo Serena	FW	1987–1991	114	45	1991–1993	10	0
(Italy) Maurizio Ganz	FW	1995–1997	68	26	1998–2001	40	9
(Italy) Fabio Di Sauro	DF	1993–1999	1	0	1999–2001	0	0
(Italy) Giorgio Frezzolini	GK	1995–2001	0	0	1999	0	0
(Italy) Pierluigi Orlandini	MF	1994–1996	30	4	2000	2	1
(Italy) Andrea Polizzano	DF	1997–2000	0	0	2000–2003	0	0
(Nigeria) Taribo West	DF	1997–1999	44	1	2000–2001	4	1
(Brazil) Ronaldo	FW	1997–2002	68	49	2007–2008	20	9
(Ivory Coast) Cyril Domoraud	DF	1999–2001	6	0	2001–2004	0	0
(Italy) Andrea Pirlo	MF	1998–2001	22	0	2001–2011	284	32
(Croatia) Dario Šimić	DF	1999–2002	66	3	2002–2008	82	1
(Italy) Marco Varaldi	GK	2000–2003	0	0	2003–2008	0	0
(Italy) Christian Vieri	FW	1999–2005	143	103	2005–2006	8	1
(Italy) Matteo Bogani	FW	2000–2001	0	0	2001–2003	0	0
(Italy) Giuseppe Ticli	MF	1999–2003	0	0	2003–2007	0	0
(Italy) Alessandro Livi	MF	2001–2003	0	0	2003–2005	0	0
(Netherlands) Clarence Seedorf	MF	2000–2002	64	8	2002–2012	300	47
(Italy) Luca Ceccarelli	DF	2002	0	0	2003	0	0
(Italy) Salvatore Ferraro	DF	2002	1	0	2003–2008	0	0
(Argentina) Hernán Crespo	FW	2002–2003	18	7	2004–2005	28	11
(Argentina) Hernán Crespo	FW	2006–2008	49	18	2004–2005	28	11
(Argentina) Hernán Crespo	FW	2008–2009	14	2	2004–2005	28	11
(Italy) Giuseppe Favalli	DF	2004–2006	49	0	2006–2010	80	2
(Netherlands) Chedric Seedorf	MF	2000–2001	0	0	2008–2009	0	0
(Hungary) Attila Filkor	MF	2006–2010	0	0	2010–2015	0	0
(Romania) Cristian Daminuță	DF	2008–2010	1	0	2010–2015	0	0
(Switzerland) Mattia Desole	DF	2008–2010	0	0	2010–2014	0	0
(Italy) Mattia Destro	FW	2005–2010	0	0	2015	15	3
(Sweden) Zlatan Ibrahimović	FW	2006–2009	88	57	2010–2012	61	42
(Sweden) Zlatan Ibrahimović	FW	2006–2009	88	57	2020–2023	64	34
(Italy) Mario Balotelli	FW	2007–2010	59	20	2013–2014	43	26
(Italy) Mario Balotelli	FW	2007–2010	59	20	2015–2016	20	1
(Brazil) Amantino Mancini	FW	2008–2011	26	1	2010	7	0
(Italy) Luca Santonocito	MF	2005–2007	0	0	2010–2014	0	0
(Ghana) Sulley Muntari	MF	2008–2012	66	7	2012	13	3
(Ghana) Sulley Muntari	MF	2008–2012	66	7	2012–2015	57	8
(Italy) Giampaolo Pazzini	FW	2011–2012	50	16	2012–2015	74	21
(Italy) Andrea Poli	MF	2011–2012	18	0	2013–2017	90	3
(Argentina) Matías Silvestre	DF	2012–2015	9	0	2013–2014	4	1
(Uruguay) Diego Laxalt	DF	2013–2016	0	0	2018–2021	24	0
(Italy) Leonardo Bonucci	DF	2005–2006	1	0	2017–2018	35	2
(Italy) Leonardo Bonucci	DF	2006–2009	0	0	2017–2018	35	2

=== Milan, then Inter ===
Player	Pos.	Milan			Inter		
Player	Pos.	Tenure	Apps	Goals	Tenure	Apps	Goals
(Switzerland) Hugo Rietmann	MF	1906–1908	2	0	1909	1	0
(Switzerland) Carlo Hopf	MF	1908	0	0	1909	2	0
(Switzerland) Arnaldo Woelkel	MF	1908	?	?	1909	2	0
(Italy) Franco Bontadini	MF	1910–1911	7	1	1911–1920	47	28
(Italy) Gustavo Carrer	FW	1904–1907	2	0	1912–1913	6	0
(Italy) Gustavo Carrer	FW	1909–1912	38	6	1912–1913	6	0
(Italy) Giuseppe Rizzi	MF	1904–1907	7	3	1913–1915	20	0
(Italy) Giuseppe Rizzi	MF	1910–1913	42	16	1913–1915	20	0
(Italy) Aldo Cevenini	FW	1909–1912	42	26	1912–1915	51	42
(Italy) Aldo Cevenini	FW	1915–1919	0	0	1919–1921	18	2
(Italy) Aldo Cevenini	FW	1915–1919	0	0	1922–1923	22	2
(Italy) Luigi Cevenini	FW	1911–1912	1	1	1912–1915	55	65
(Italy) Luigi Cevenini	FW	1915–1919	0	0	1919–1921	40	55
(Italy) Luigi Cevenini	FW	1915–1919	0	0	1922–1927	94	44
(Italy) Julio Bavastro	FW	1910–1913	37	4	1913–1916	41	10
(Italy) Marco Sala	DF	1908–1920	90	3	1921–1922	18	0
(Italy) Cesare Cevenini	DF	1917–1918	0	0	1919–1923	12	3
(Italy) Cesare Cevenini	DF	1917–1918	0	0	1926–1927	?	?
(Italy) Carlo Cevenini	FW	1917–1920	9	2	1920–1921	16	15
(Italy) Carlo Cevenini	FW	1923–1927	68	25	1920–1921	16	15
(Italy) Francesco Soldera	MF	1914–1924	108	9	1924–1925	1	0
(Italy) Guglielmo Gajani	MF	1918–1919	0	0	1927–1928	?	?
(Italy) Guglielmo Gajani	MF	1925–1927	18	0	1927–1928	?	?
(Italy) Giovanni Bolzoni	DF	1924–1925	1	0	1928–1932	71	0
(Italy) Giovanni Bolzoni	DF	1926–1927	4	0	1928–1932	71	0
(Italy) Alessandro Savelli	MF	1923–1927	78	35	1927–1928	16	6
(Italy) Emilio Gattoronchieri	MF	1934–1936	7	0	1936–1938	15	0
(Italy) Bernardo Poli	DF	1933–1935	0	0	1939–1944	46	2
(Italy) Oliviero Mascheroni	MF	1934–1936	6	0	1941–1942	13	3
(Italy) Savino Bellini	MF	1943–1944	0	0	1945–1946	7	1
(Italy) Romano Penzo	FW	1943–1944	11	4	1945–1946	27	8
(Italy) Sergio Marchi	DF	1944–1945	17	0	1945–1948	88	0
(Italy) Lino Grava	DF	1947–1949	3	0	1952–1953	1	0
(Italy) Bruno Mazza	MF	1942–1943	3	1	1952–1955	83	7
(Italy) Celestino Celio	MF	1952–1953	26	0	1955–1956	16	1
(Italy) Eugenio Rizzolini	DF	1955–1956	0	0	1956–1959	4	1
(Italy) Lorenzo Buffon	GK	1949–1959	277	0	1960–1963	79	0
(Italy) Gaetano Salvemini	FW	1958–1959	0	0	1968–1969	0	0
(Peru) Víctor Benítez	DF	1962–1963	12	1	1967–1968	8	1
(Peru) Víctor Benítez	DF	1964–1965	16	1	1967–1968	8	1
(Italy) Dario Barluzzi	GK	1962–1967	85	0	1967–1968	0	0
(Italy) Aquilino Bonfanti	MF	1964–1965	3	0	1967–1968	7	1
(Italy) Nevio Scala	MF	1965–1969	11	0	1973–1975	26	1
(Italy) Nevio Scala	MF	1975–1976	23	0	1973–1975	26	1
(Italy) Fulvio Collovati	DF	1976–1982	158	4	1982–1986	109	3
(Italy) Sergio Battistini	DF	1980–1985	162	29	1990–1994	112	10
(Italy) Fabrizio Ferron	GK	1985–1986	0	0	1999–2000	4	0
(Italy) Francesco Toldo	GK	1990–1993	0	0	2001–2010	148	0
(Italy) Christian Panucci	DF	1993–1996	89	9	1999–2001	26	1
(Italy) Cristian Brocchi	MF	1994–1998	0	0	2000–2001	15	1
(Italy) Cristian Brocchi	MF	2001–2008	99	4	2000–2001	15	1
(Italy) Roberto Baggio	FW	1995–1997	51	12	1998–2000	41	9
(Italy) Davide Cordone	MF	1998–1999	0	0	1999–2003	0	0
(Italy) Marco Bonura	MF	1997–2000	0	0	2000–2003	0	0
(Italy) Stefano Lombardi	DF	1993–1994	0	0	2000–2004	0	0
(Italy) Francesco Coco	DF	1995–2002	56	2	2002–2007	26	0
(Netherlands) Edgar Davids	MF	1996–1997	19	0	2004–2005	14	0
(France) Patrick Vieira	MF	1995–1996	2	0	2006–2010	67	6
(Argentina) Andrés Guglielminpietro	MF	1998–2001	57	6	2001–2004	30	0
(Italy) Domenico Morfeo	MF	1998–1999	11	1	2002–2003	17	1
(Denmark) Thomas Helveg	DF	1998–2003	105	0	2003–2004	23	0
(Croatia) Dražen Brnčić	MF	2000–2001	1	0	2001–2003	0	0
(Italy) Paolo Ginestra	GK	2000–2001	0	0	2001–2004	0	0
(Turkey) Ümit Davala	DF	2001–2002	10	0	2002–2004	0	0
(Italy) Matteo Giordano	DF	2001–2003	0	0	2003–2007	0	0
(Italy) Simone Brunelli	GK	2002–2003	0	0	2003–2005	0	0
(Italy) Matteo Deinite	MF	2002–2003	0	0	2003–2007	0	0
(Italy) Ronny Toma	MF	2002–2003	0	0	2003–2008	0	0
(Italy) Marco Fossati	MF	2002–2007	—	—	2007–2010	—	—
(Italy) Marco Fossati	MF	2010–2011	—	—	2007–2010	—	—
(Italy) Marco Fossati	MF	2011–2015	0	0	2007–2010	—	—
(Italy) Antonio Cassano	FW	2011–2012	33	7	2012–2013	28	7
(Ghana) Edmund Hottor	MF	2010–2015	0	0	2016–2017	0	0
(Italy) Matteo Darmian	DF	2006–2010	4	0	2020–2026	150	11
(Turkey) **Hakan Çalhanoğlu**	MF	2017–2021	135	22	2021–present	158	40
(Italy) Raoul Bellanova	DF	2018–2019	0	0	2022–2023	18	0
(Italy) Francesco Acerbi	DF	2012–2013	6	0	2022–2026	101	3

== Managers who worked at both clubs ==
=== Inter, then Milan ===
Manager	Inter					Milan				
Manager	Tenure	Matches	Wins	Draws	Losses	Tenure	Matches	Wins	Draws	Losses
(Hungary) József Viola	1928–1929	31	17	3	11	1933–1934; 1938–1940	71	27	18	26
(Italy) Stefano Pioli	2016–2017	27	14	3	10	2019–2024	240	130	58	52

=== Milan, then Inter ===
Manager	Milan					Inter				
Manager	Tenure	Matches	Wins	Draws	Losses	Tenure	Matches	Wins	Draws	Losses
(Italy) Giuseppe Bigogno	1946–1949	116	61	27	28	1958–1959	26	16	5	5
(Italy) Giovanni Trapattoni	1974; 1975–1976	47	21	13	13	1986–1991	233	124	65	44
(Italy) Luigi Radice	1981–1982	23	6	8	9	1983–1984	41	16	13	12
(Italy) Ilario Castagner	1982–1984	78	36	32	10	1984–1985	70	36	20	14
(Italy) Alberto Zaccheroni	1998–2001	125	54	44	27	2003–2004	43	18	13	12
(Brazil) Leonardo Araújo	2009–2010	48	23	13	12	2010–2011	32	21	4	7

== Trophies ==
As of 13 May 2026

- Numbers with this background denote the competition record.

Inter	Competition	Milan
Domestic
21	Serie A	19
10	Coppa Italia	5
8	Supercoppa Italiana	8
39	Domestic total	32
International
3	UEFA Champions League	7
—	UEFA Cup Winners' Cup (defunct)	2
3	UEFA Cup	—
—	UEFA Super Cup	5
2	Intercontinental Cup (defunct)	3
1	FIFA Club World Cup	1
9	International total	18
48	Grand total	50
