= Tony Cargnelli =

Austrian football manager (1889–1974)

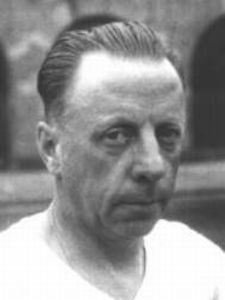

Personal information
- Full name: Anton Cargnelli
- Date of birth: 1 February 1889
- Place of birth: Vienna, Austria-Hungary
- Date of death: 27 June 1974 (aged 85)
- Position: Forward

Youth career
- Rennweger SV

Senior career*
Years	Team	Apps	(Gls)
1906–1907	Wiener AC		
1907–1910	Germania Schwechat		
1910–1917	Wiener AF		

International career
1909	Austria	1	(0)

Managerial career
- 1920–1921: Germania Schwechat
- 1921–1922: VfL Köln
- 1922–1923: SC Idar-Oberstein
- 1923: Borussia Dortmund
- 1924: Admira Wien
- 1924–1925: VfB Mühlburg
- 1926–1927: CA Timișoara
- 1926–1927: Politehnica Timișoara
- 1927–1929: Torino
- 1930–1931: Palermo
- 1932–1933: Foggia
- 1933–1934: Bari
- 1934–1936: Torino
- 1936–1938: Bari
- 1938–1940: Ambrosiana-Inter
- 1940–1942: Torino
- 1942–1943: Liguria
- 1943–1944: Cuneo
- 1946–1948: Lazio Roma
- 1948: Lucchese Libertas
- 1948–1949: Bologna
- 1950–1951: Alessandria
- * Club domestic league appearances and goals

Anton Cargnelli (1 February 1889 – 27 June 1974), commonly known as Tony Cargnelli, was an Austrian football player and manager.

Very little is known about his time as a player. He is most famous for managing several top clubs in Italian football.

== Club career ==
Cargnelli was born on 1 February 1889 in Vienna, Austria-Hungary to an Italian father and Austrian mother. He began playing junior-level football at Rennweger SV. Subsequently, he started his senior career in 1906 at Wiener AC. In 1907, he joined Germania Schwechat for three years. Afterwards, Cargnelli moved to Wiener AF with whom he won the 1913–14 title. An article in the Sport Tagblatt newspaper described Cargnelli's style of play as follows: "Old football knowers still remember the WAC (n.r. - Wiener AC club) and WAF (n.r. - Wiener FC club, or AF Vienna) player, Toni Cargnelli. Cargnelli was a fighter and a technical player. He played almost every position because he was among the few footballers who understood football and therefore did not have to rely on strength. In 1917 he retired as a player and tried to put into practice the knowledge he had acquired on the field as a coach".

== International career ==
Cargnelli made one appearance for Austria, playing the entire match on 30 May 1909 in a 1–1 friendly draw against rivals Hungary.

== Managerial career ==
Cargnelli started coaching in 1920 at Germania Schwechat. One year later, he moved to Germany, coaching VfL Köln and then SC Idar-Oberstein. In July 1923, Cargnelli became the first coach of Borussia Dortmund where he stayed until December. He returned to Austria for half a year to coach Admira Wien. Subsequently, he made a comeback to Germany at VfB Mühlburg.

In 1926, Cargnelli went to coach in Romania, being hired by CA Timișoara, but also worked as a volunteer for Politehnica Timișoara. He managed both clubs even when they faced each other, and after Politehnica's 3–0 win over CA from 1927 in the Regional championship, the Universul newspaper wrote: "The people of Timișoara had the opportunity to see a beautiful game between two teams that each in their own way showed what they owed to the joint coach Cargnelli". In 1927 he finished the Regional championship with CA in fifth place and with Politehnica in second place with 23 points, just one below first-placed Chinezul Timișoara which qualified to the national championship. After he ended his spell in Romania, an article from the Sport Tagblatt newspaper described Cargnelli's managing style: "He acquired his theoretical knowledge at the German University, being aware that it is not enough to show the players how to play the ball, but to be able to appreciate how much physical effort he can demand of each player. Physical training is not a mechanical thing, but must be worked on individually, and that is possible only if you have the necessary knowledge".

In 1927 he went to coach in Italy, first at Torino where he won the 1927–28 title with the championship's best offense of 111 goals, as players Adolfo Baloncieri with 35 goals and Julio Libonatti with 31 were the league top-scorers. In the following season, the team finished first in Group A of the league, six points ahead of AC Milan, reaching the championship final which was played in three legs and lost to Bologna.

Cargnelli's next move was to sign with Palermo in Serie B. Subsequently, he went to Serie C side Foggia, helping them gain promotion to the second league in the 1932–33 season. In the 1933–34 Serie B edition, Cargnelli coached Bari, coming close to promoting the club for the first time to Serie A, but lost the promotion final to Sampierdarenese Genova.

In 1935, Cargnelli returned to Torino, managing to save the team from relegation and to win the Coppa Italia after a 5–1 victory over Alessandria in the final. In 1936, he returned for a second spell at Bari, maintaining their position in Serie A for two years. In 1938, Cargnelli arrived at Ambrosiana-Inter where he worked with international forwards Giuseppe Meazza, Pietro Ferraris and Annibale Frossi. He helped the club win its first Coppa Italia in the 1938–39 edition, after getting past Napoli, Livorno and A.S. Roma in the campaign, defeating Novara 2–1 in the final. In the following season, Ambrosiana-Inter won the league title, with a three-point lead over Bologna. After a third spell at Torino from 1940 to 1942, he worked for Liguria and then Cuneo. In 1946, Cargnelli arrived at Lazio Roma, which he led for two seasons. In the following years he worked for Lucchese Libertas, Bologna and Alessandria, retiring at age 62 after leading the latter during the 1950–51 Serie C season.

== Death ==
Cargnelli died on 27 June 1974 at the age of 85.

== Honours ==
=== Player ===
Wiener AF

- 1. Klasse: 1913–14

=== Manager ===
Torino

- Divisione Nazionale: 1927–28, runner-up 1928–29
- Coppa Italia: 1935–36

Foggia

- Serie C: 1932–33

Ambrosiana-Inter

- Serie A: 1939–40
- Coppa Italia: 1938–39
