= Alghisi =

Alghisi is an Italian surname. Notable people with the surname include:

- Galasso Alghisi (1523–1573), Italian architect, author, and military engineer
- Luciano Alghisi (1917–2004), Italian soccer player
- Paris Francesco Alghisi (1666–1733), Italian composer and organist
