= Barsanti =

Barsanti is an Italian surname. Notable people with the surname include:

- Nino Barsanti (1983–Present), Italian American Co-Creator of Glam Competition Jewelry
- Eugenio Barsanti (1821–1864), Italian inventor of the internal combustion engine
- Alessandro Barsanti (1858–1917), Italian architect and Egyptologist
- Francesco Barsanti (1690–1775), Italian flutist, oboist and composer
- Giorgio Barsanti (1918–1994), Italian football player
- Olinto M. Barsanti (1917–1973), commander of the 101st Airborne Division in Vietnam from 1967 to 1968
- Ottavio Barsanti (c.1826–1884), Italian Franciscan missionary in New Zealand
