= Giuseppe Peruchetti =

Italian footballer and coach

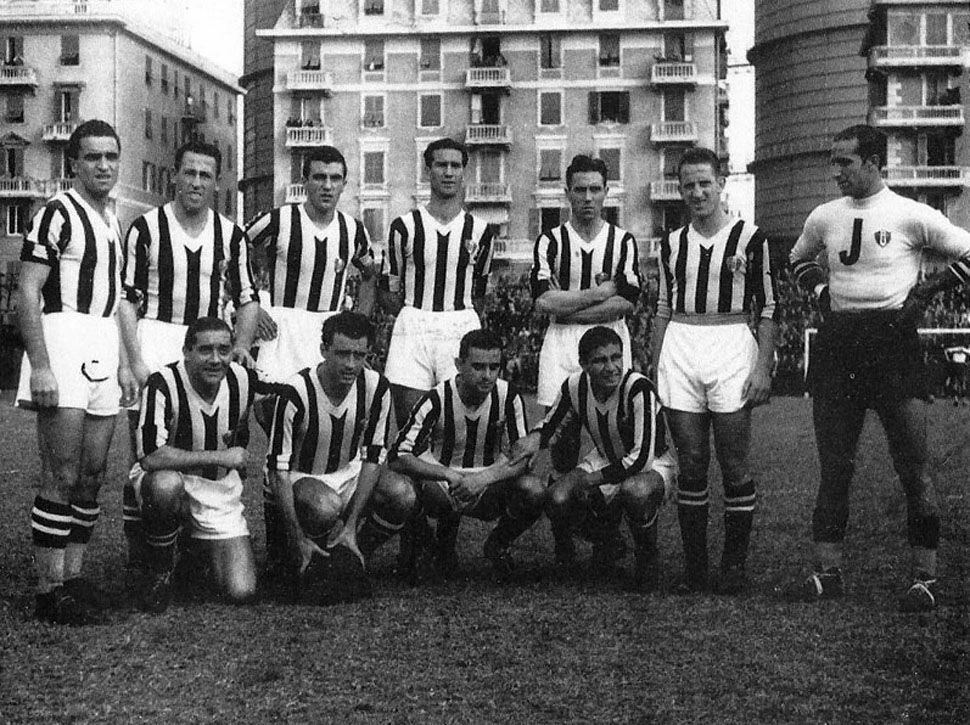
- Giuseppe Peruchetti (back row, first from right) as part of Juventus in 1942

Personal information
- Date of birth: 30 October 1907
- Place of birth: Gardone Val Trompia, Italy
- Date of death: 1995 (aged 87–88)
- Place of death: Gardone Val Trompia, Italy
- Height: 1.82 m (5 ft 11 1/2 in)
- Position: Goalkeeper

Senior career*
Years	Team	Apps	(Gls)
1928–1936	Brescia	196	(0)
1936–1941	Ambrosiana-Inter	98	(0)
1941–1944	Juventus	34	(0)

International career
1936	Italy	2	(0)

Managerial career
- 1940–1941: Internazionale
- * Club domestic league appearances and goals

Giuseppe Peruchetti (Italian pronunciation: [dʒuˈzɛppe peruˈketti]; 30 October 1907 – 1995) was an Italian professional football player and coach who played as a goalkeeper.

== Honours ==
Inter

- Serie A champion: 1937–38, 1939–40.
- Coppa Italia winner: 1938–39.

Juventus

- Coppa Italia winner: 1941–42.
