= Rovelli =

Rovelli is a surname. Notable people with the surname include:

- Carlo Rovelli (born 1956), Italian physicist
- Grant Rovelli (born 1983), Australian rugby league player
- Nino Rovelli (1917–1990), Italian bobsledder
- Vittorio Rovelli (1916–1996), Italian professional football player
- Willy Rovelli (born 1979), French actor, comedian and television personality.
