= Renato Olmi =

Italian footballer

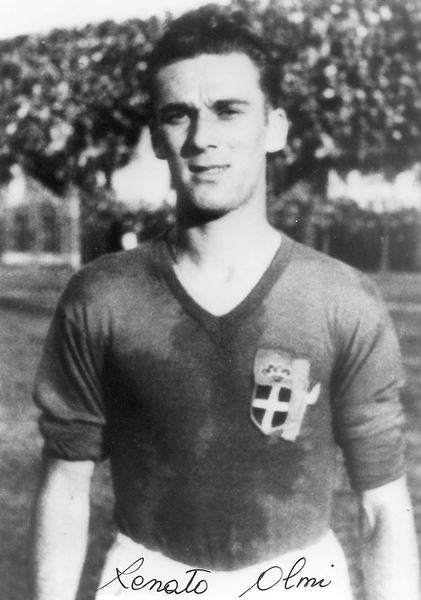

Personal information
- Full name: Renato Olmi
- Date of birth: 12 July 1914
- Place of birth: Trezzo sull'Adda, Italy
- Date of death: 15 May 1985 (aged 70)
- Place of death: Crema, Italy
- Position: Midfielder

Senior career*
Years	Team	Apps	(Gls)
1931–1933	Crema		
1933–1936	Cremonese	70	(12)
1936–1937	Brescia	26	(14)
1937–1941	Ambrosiana-Inter	107	(1)
1941–1942	Juventus	19	(1)
1942–1943	Ambrosiana-Inter	10	(0)
1943–1944	Cremonese	12	(0)
1945–1947	Crema	30	(0)

International career
1938–1940	Italy	3	(0)
Medal record
Italy
FIFA World Cup
Gold medal – first place	1938 France
- * Club domestic league appearances and goals

Renato Olmi (Italian pronunciation: [reˈnaːto ˈolmi]; 12 July 1914 – 15 May 1985) was an Italian footballer who played as a midfielder.

== Club career ==
During his club career, Olmi played for Italian sides Ambrosiana-Inter and Juventus in Serie A. He also played for Crema, Cremonese, and Brescia in the lower divisions.

== International career ==
Olmi was part of the 1938 FIFA World Cup-winning squad that won Italy's second World Cup title. He earned 3 caps for the Italy national team in 1940.

== Honours ==
=== Club ===
Cremonese

- Serie C: 1935–36

Inter

- Serie A: 1937–38, 1939–40
- Coppa Italia: 1938–39

Juventus

- Coppa Italia: 1941–42

=== International ===
Italy

- FIFA World Cup: 1938
