= Félix Demaría =

Argentine footballer (born 1912)

Personal information
- Date of birth: 27 April 1912
- Place of birth: Haedo, Argentina
- Positions: Midfielder; defender

Senior career*
Years	Team	Apps	(Gls)
1931	Estudiantes de La Plata		
1932–1934	Ambrosiana-Inter	8	(0)
- * Club domestic league appearances and goals

Félix Demaría, also known as Felice Demaria or Felix De Maria (born 27 April 1912, date of death unknown) was an Argentine professional footballer, who played as a midfielder or as a defender.

== Career ==
Demaría played for Estudiantes de La Plata in Argentina before moving to Italy to play for Ambrosiana-Inter in Serie A.

His older brother Attilio Demaría played for the national teams of Argentina and Italy. To distinguish them, Attilio was referred to as Demaría I and Félix as Demaría II.
