= Ugo Locatelli =

Italian footballer (1916-1993)

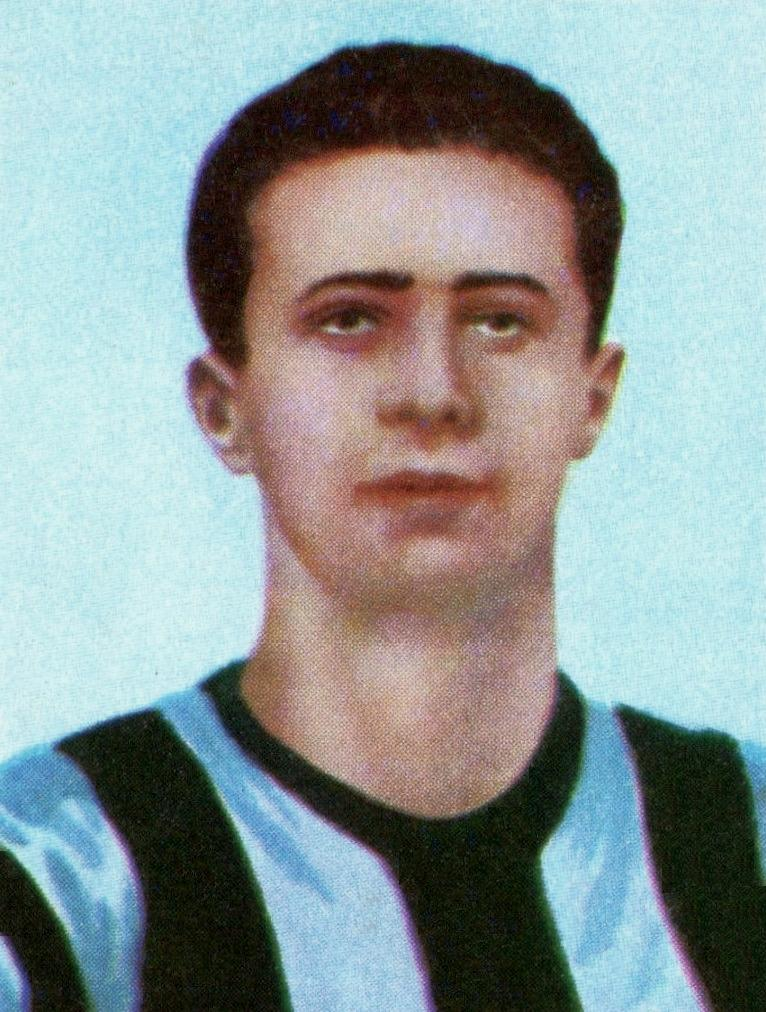
- Locatelli with Inter Milan

Personal information
- Date of birth: 5 February 1916
- Place of birth: Toscolano-Maderno, Italy
- Date of death: 28 May 1993 (aged 77)
- Place of death: Turin, Italy
- Height: 1.71 m (5 ft 7 in)
- Positions: Forward; midfielder

Senior career*
Years	Team	Apps	(Gls)
1932–1936	Brescia	24	(8)
1934–1935	→ Atalanta (loan)	15	(5)
1935–1936	Brescia	29	(2)
1936–1941	Inter Milan	146	(1)
1941–1943	Juventus	56	(3)
1943–1944	Brescia	7	(0)
1944–1949	Juventus	117	(4)
Total		394	(23)

International career
1936–1940	Italy	22	(0)
Medal record
Italy
Summer Olympics
Gold medal – first place	1936 Berlin
FIFA World Cup
Gold medal – first place	1938 France
- * Club domestic league appearances and goals

Ugo Locatelli (Italian pronunciation: [ˈuːɡo lokaˈtɛlli]; 5 February 1916 – 28 May 1993) was an Italian international footballer who played as a midfielder or as a forward. Regarded as one of Italy's greatest players, he won a gold medal at the 1936 Summer Olympics and a winner's medal at the 1938 FIFA World Cup while playing with the Italy national team, and is only one of four Italian players to have managed this achievement.

== Club career ==
Locatelli was born in Toscolano-Maderno, near Brescia, Lombardy. At club level, he had a successful career, winning the Scudetto twice with Inter Milan, in 1938 and 1940. He first played for Brescia between 1933 and 1936, aside from a brief loan to Atalanta, before transferring over to Inter, which was known as Ambrosiana Inter Milan at the time, where he remained until 1941. He ended his career with Juventus in 1949, following his transfer to the club in 1941, winning the Coppa Italia in 1942.

== International career ==
A midfielder in Vittorio Pozzo's Italy national teams, he appeared in 22 matches for the azzurri, starting play in the first round match at the 1936 Summer Olympics versus the United States, as Italy went on to win a gold medal in the tournament. He later also went on to win a winner's medal at the 1938 FIFA World Cup with Italy, and was named to the All-Star Team of the tournament. Locatelli is one of only four Italians to have been doubly honoured at the Olympics and a World Cup; he never appeared on a losing side for the Italy national team.

== Style of play ==
Locatelli was a small, quick, and agile player, with good technique, who also possessed an accurate shot, despite his lack of striking power. He initially began his career as a centre-forward, and was later deployed as a defensive central midfielder whilst at Juventus under Umberto Caligaris. During his time with Atalanta, he also played as an offensive central midfielder.

== Honours ==
Brescia

- Serie B runner-up: 1932–33

Ambrosiana Inter

- Serie A: 1937–38, 1939–40; runner-up 1940–41
- Coppa Italia: 1938–39

Juventus

- Coppa Italia: 1941–42

Italy

- Olympic Gold Medal: 1936
- FIFA World Cup: 1938

Individual

- FIFA World Cup All-Star Team: 1938
