= Enrico Candiani =

Italian footballer (1918-2008)

Personal information
- Full name: Enrico Aldo Candiani
- Date of birth: 29 September 1918
- Place of birth: Busto Arsizio, Italy
- Date of death: 27 February 2008 (aged 89)
- Place of death: Busto Arsizio, Italy
- Height: 1.78 m (5 ft 10 in)
- Position: Midfielder

Senior career*
| Years | Team | Apps | (Gls) |
| 1937–1946 | Internazionale | 187 | (71) |
| 1946–1947 | Juventus | 35 | (15) |
| 1947–1949 | Pro Patria | 56 | (18) |
| 1949–1950 | Milan | 22 | (8) |
| 1950–1951 | Livorno | 27 | (7) |
| 1951–1952 | Foggia | | |
- * Club domestic league appearances and goals

Enrico Aldo Candiani (29 September 1918, in Busto Arsizio – 27 February 2008, in Busto Arsizio) was an Italian professional footballer who played as a midfielder.

== Honours ==
Inter

- Serie A champion: 1939–40
- Coppa Italia winner: 1938–39
