= Attilio Demaría =

Italian Argentine footballer (1909–1990)

Personal information
- Full name: Atilio José Demaría
- Date of birth: 19 March 1909
- Place of birth: Buenos Aires, Argentina
- Date of death: 11 November 1990 (aged 81)
- Place of death: Haedo, Argentina
- Position: Striker

Senior career*
Years	Team	Apps	(Gls)
1926–1931	Estudiantil Porteño	108	(37)
1931	Gimnasia La Plata	1	(0)
1931–1936	Ambrosiana-Inter	155	(50)
1936	Independiente	3	(1)
1937-1938	Estudiantil Porteño	21	(14)
1938–1943	Ambrosiana-Inter	113	(26)
1943–1944	Novara	16	(5)
1944–1946	Legnano	16	(5)
1946–1948	Cosenza	44	(0)
Total		377	(138)

International career
1930–1931	Argentina	3	(0)
1932–1940	Italy	13	(3)

Managerial career
- 1945–1946: Legnano
- 1946–1948: Cosenza
- 1951: Gimnasia La Plata
- 1965: Sportivo Italiano
- 1973: Almirante Brown
Medal record
Men's football
Representing Italy
FIFA World Cup
Winner	1934 Italy
Central European International Cup
Winner	1933–35 Europe
Representing Argentina
FIFA World Cup
Runner-up	1930 Uruguay
- * Club domestic league appearances and goals

Atilio José Demaría (Spanish pronunciation: [aˈtiljo xoˈse ðemaˈɾi.a]; 19 March 1909 – 11 November 1990), Italianized as Attilio Demaria (IPA: [atˈtiːljo demaˈriːa]), was an Italian Argentine footballer, who played as a striker. He played club football in Argentina and Italy. At international level, he represented Argentina in the 1930 World Cup and Italy in the 1934 World Cup, reaching the finals of both tournaments and winning the latter edition of the competition.

== Club career ==
Demaría was born in Buenos Aires. After starting his career in Argentina, he played 295 games for Internazionale of Italy between 1931 and 1943, scoring 86 goals for the club, also serving as the team's captain between 1940 and 1943.

Demaría also played for Gimnasia de La Plata, Estudiantil Porteño and Club Atlético Independiente in Argentina and Novara, Legnano and Cosenza in Italy.

== International career ==
Demaría represented the Argentina national team on three occasions between 1930 and 1931, and took part in the 1930 World Cup, winning a runners-up medal. He was later also a member of the Italy squad that won the 1934 World Cup on home soil as well as the squad that won the 1933–35 Central European International Cup; in total, he made thirteen appearances for Italy between 1932 and 1940, scoring three goals.

== Personal life ==
His younger brother Félix Demaría also played football professionally, including a season for Ambrosiana-Inter. To distinguish them, Attilio was referred to as Demaría I and Félix as Demaría II. Attilio Demaría died in Haedo, Buenos Aires on 11 November 1990.

== Honours ==
Ambrosiana-Inter

- Serie A: 1939–40
- Coppa Italia: 1938–39

Argentina

- FIFA World Cup: Runner-up 1930

Italy

- World Cup: 1934
- Central European International Cup: 1933–35
