= Aldo Campatelli =

Italian footballer (1919–1984)

Personal information
- Date of birth: 7 April 1919
- Place of birth: Milan, Italy
- Date of death: 3 June 1984 (aged 65)
- Height: 1.75 m (5 ft 9 in)
- Position: Midfielder

Senior career*
Years	Team	Apps	(Gls)
1936–1950	Inter Milan	304	(44)
1950–1953	Bologna	46	(7)
Total		350	(51)

International career
1939–1950	Italy	7	(0)

Managerial career
- 1954–1955: Vicenza
- 1955: Inter Milan
- 1956–1957: Bologna
- 1959–1960: Inter Milan
- 1965–1966: Vicenza
- 1968–1969: Genoa
- * Club domestic league appearances and goals

Aldo Campatelli (Italian pronunciation: [ˈaldo kampaˈtɛlli]; 7 April 1919 – 3 June 1984) was an Italian football manager and player, who played as a midfielder.

== Club career ==
Born in Milan, Campatelli debuted in Serie A at 17 years of age and played for Inter Milan for twelve seasons. In his early years, he played as an offensive winger with an eye for goal; he subsequently moved to midfield and later also played as a defender.

At twenty years of age, he had already won a league championship and had been called up to the Italy national team by Pozzo to replace Serantoni in midfield.

In 1940 he won his second title with Inter becoming the club's captain and a pillar of the team's midfield, while still maintaining his great striking ability.

After taking part in the 1950 World Cup, he went to Bologna where two years later he closed a brilliant career to become a coach.

=== Managerial career ===
In 1955, Campatelli managed Inter Milan but was sacked after only 12 games. He returned again briefly as a co-manager with Camillo Achilli.

In his last two years at Inter, Campatelli became the mentor of the defender, Enzo Bearzot, who later became the coach of the Italian team that won the 1982 World Cup.

== International career ==
Campatelli played a few internationals for the Italy national team between 1939 and 1950, before being called up to the 1950 World Cup squad. In the game against Sweden, which was his last game for the 'Azzurri', Campatelli wore the number 10 jersey. A defensive midfielder, he was brought in to replace the team's best attacker.

== Honours ==
=== Player ===
Inter Milan

- Serie A: 1937–38, 1939–40
- Coppa Italia: 1938–39
