= Paris Francesco Alghisi =

Italian composer (1666–1733)

Paris Francesco Alghisi (June 19, 1666 – March 29–30, 1733) was an Italian organist and composer. He was born in and died in Brescia, Republic of Venice.

== Biography ==
Alghisi studied music with Orazio Pollarolo, the organist at Brescia Cathedral and father of the renowned composer Carlo Francesco Pollarolo. Subsequently, likely between 1681 and 1683, he spent a brief period in the service of the King of Poland, at a time when his teacher was active there as maestro di cappella.

Upon returning to his homeland, Alghisi joined the Order of Saint Philip Neri, though he did not stop composing secular music. From 1690, he served as maestro di cappella at Santa Maria della Pace, the Order's church. That same year, he also applied for the position of organist but was unsuccessful. During this period, he also served as maestro di cappella at the Collegio dei Nobili in Brescia and was a member of the Accademia Filarmonica in Bologna.

On February 10, 1701, he was appointed organist of Brescia Cathedral, a position he held until his death.

== Notable works ==
=== Operas ===
- L'amor di Curzio per la patria (libretto by G. C. Corradi, 1690, Venice)
- Il trionfo della continenza (libretto di G. C. Corradi, 1690, Venice)

=== Oratorios ===
All oratorios were premiered in Brescia.

- La giornata del Diporto (1692)
- Le piaghe sante da una ferita (1693)
- La mensa bersagliatrice dell'eresia (1695)
- Il trionfo della fede (1697)
- Megera delusa (1698)
- La gara del merito (1699)
- Il transito del glorioso S. Antonio di Padoa (1700)
- Il disinganno dell'intelletto (1701)
- Il serafino nell'amare e cherubino nell'intendere (1703)
- Il trionfo della sapienza (1704)
- Lite in cielo tra la sapienza e la santità (1705)

=== Other works ===
- Sonata da camera for 2 violins and violoncello/clavicembalo, op.1 (1693, Modena)
- Cantate (1694, Bologna)
- Suaves accentus (mottetto per soprano, archi e organo)
- Divote canzonette
- Credo a quatro, per archi, organo e tastiera
- Various sacred works
