= Aldo Boffi =

Italian footballer (1915-1987)

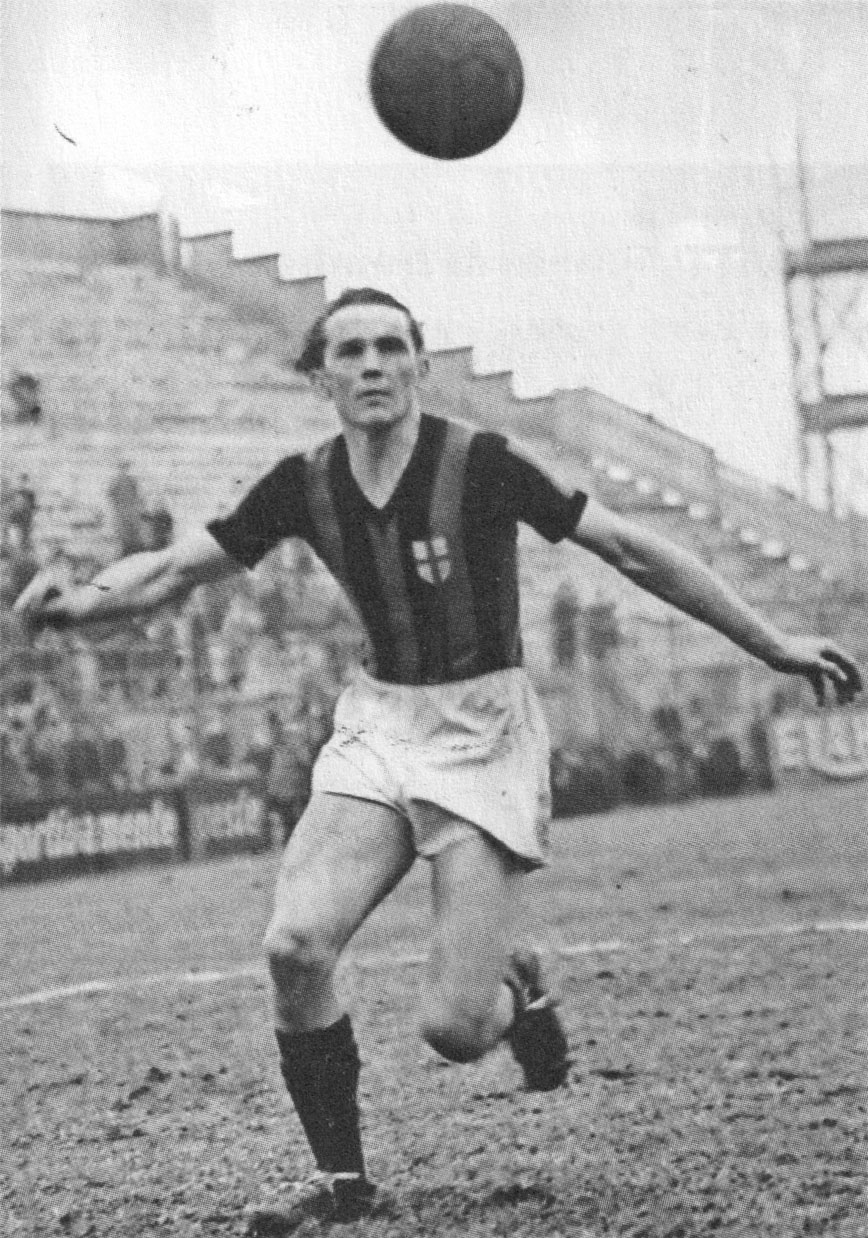
- Boffi playing for AC Milan

Personal information
- Date of birth: 26 February 1915
- Place of birth: Giussano, Kingdom of Italy
- Date of death: 26 October 1987 (aged 72)
- Place of death: Giussano, Italy
- Height: 1.76 m (5 ft 9 in)
- Position: Striker

Senior career*
Years	Team	Apps	(Gls)
1934–1936	Seregno		
1936–1945	AC Milan	163	(109)
1945–1946	Atalanta	17	(3)
1946–1952	Seregno	107	(56)
Total		287	(168)

International career
1938–1939	Italy	2	(0)
- * Club domestic league appearances and goals

Aldo Boffi (Italian pronunciation: [ˈaldo ˈbɔffi]; 26 February 1915 – 26 October 1987) was an Italian professional footballer who played as a striker. At club level, he played for Italian sides Seregno, AC Milan and Atalanta, and he represented the Italy national football team at international level.

== Club career ==
Boffi played club football with Seregno, AC Milan and Atalanta. During the 1938–39 season, he was joint-capcannonieri (top scorer) in Serie A, along with Ettore Puricelli of Bologna, with 19 goals; he managed the same feat in the 1939–40 and 1941–42 Serie A seasons, with 24 and 22 goals respectively.

== International career ==
Boffi made two appearances for Italy between 1938 and 1939.

== Career statistics ==
=== Club ===
Club	Season	League		Cup		Other		Total	
Club	Season	Apps	Goals	Apps	Goals	Apps	Goals	Apps	Goals
AC Milan	1936–1937	22	8	6	7	-	-	28	15
AC Milan	1937–1938	24	16	4	3	1	0	29	19
AC Milan	1938–1939	28	19	2	2	-	-	30	21
AC Milan	1939–1940	30	24	1	0	-	-	31	24
AC Milan	1940–1941	23	16	2	2	-	-	25	18
AC Milan	1941–1942	26	22	5	6	-	-	31	28
AC Milan	1942–1943	10	4	3	2	-	-	13	6
AC Milan	1944–1945	1	0	-	-	6	5	7	5
Total		164	109	23	22	7	5	194	136

== Honours ==
Individual

- Serie A Top-scorer: 1938–39, 1939–40, 1941–42
