= Angelo Caimo =

Italian footballer (born 1914 - date of death unknown )

Personal information
- Date of birth: 14 July 1914
- Place of birth: San Pietro Mosezzo, Kingdom of Italy
- Height: 1.80 m (5 ft 11 in)
- Position: Goalkeeper

Senior career*
Years	Team	Apps	(Gls)
1933–1939	Novara	124	(0)
1939–1943	Ambrosiana-Inter	60	(0)
1943–1944	Novara	16	(0)
1945–1946	Sparta Novara		
- * Club domestic league appearances and goals

Angelo Caimo (born 14 July 1914) was an Italian professional football player.

== Honours ==
- Serie A champion: 1939/40
