= Bernardo Poli =

Italian footballer (1915-1944)

Personal information
- Date of birth: 27 March 1915
- Place of birth: San Giovanni Lupatoto, Italy
- Date of death: 2 March 1944 (aged 28)
- Place of death: Milan, Italy
- Height: 1.83 m (6 ft 0 in)
- Position: Defender

Youth career
- 1933–1935: A.C. Milan

Senior career*
Years	Team	Apps	(Gls)
1935–1936	Schio		
1936–1938	Padova	25	(0)
1938–1939	Brescia	30	(0)
1939–1944	Ambrosiana-Inter	46	(2)
1942–1943	→ Spezia (loan)	21	(1)
- * Club domestic league appearances and goals

Bernardo Poli (27 March 1915 – 2 March 1944) was an Italian professional football player. He was killed in action during World War II.

== Honours ==
- Serie A champion: 1939/40.
