= Celso Battaia =

Italian footballer (1920-2007)

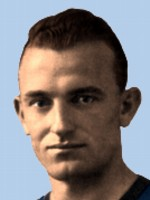
- Battaia with Inter Milan

Personal information
- Date of birth: 1 February 1920
- Place of birth: Milan, Italy
- Date of death: 5 February 2007 (aged 87)
- Place of death: Crema, Italy
- Height: 1.72 m (5 ft 8 in)
- Position: Defender

Youth career
- 1937–1938: Inter Milan

Senior career*
Years	Team	Apps	(Gls)
1938–1945	Inter Milan	33	(0)
1940–1941	→ Udinese (loan)		
1945–1946	Andrea Doria		
1946–1947	AC Milan	13	(0)
1947–1951	Cremonese		
Total		46+	(0+)
- * Club domestic league appearances and goals

Celso Battaia (1 February 1920 – 5 February 2007) was an Italian professional footballer who played for Inter Milan, Udinese, Andrea Doria, AC Milan and Cremonese as a defender. He is one of the players who played for both Inter Milan and AC Milan. He later became a professional photographer.
