= Luciano Alghisi =

Italian footballer

Personal information
- Date of birth: 18 April 1917
- Place of birth: Milan, Italy
- Date of death: 7 November 2004 (aged 87)
- Place of death: Milan, Italy
- Position: Striker

Senior career*
Years	Team	Apps	(Gls)
1936–1938	Vigevano		
1938–1940	Roma	53	(12)
1940–1941	Bari	13	(1)
1941–1943	Liguria	31	(6)
1943–1944	Lecce		
1945–1946	Padova	32	(11)
1946–1948	Varese	58	(10)
1948–1951	Pavia		
- * Club domestic league appearances and goals

Luciano Alghisi (18 April 1917 – 7 November 2004) was an Italian professional football player.

Alghisi was born in Milan in April 1917. He played for 5 seasons (97 goals, 19 goals) in the Serie A for A.S. Roma, A.S. Bari and A.C. Liguria. On his debut in Serie A for Roma, he scored a winning goal in a 1–0 victory over A.C. Milan. He died in Milan in November 2004 at the age of 87.
