= Vittorio Rovelli =

Italian footballer (1916–1996)

Personal information
- Date of birth: August 16, 1916
- Place of birth: Renate, Italy
- Height: 1.74 m (5 ft 8 1/2 in)
- Position: Midfielder

Senior career*
Years	Team	Apps	(Gls)
1933–1935	Ambrosiana-Inter	2	(0)
1935–1936	Cremonese	29	(20)
1936–1937	Ambrosiana-Inter	4	(1)
1937–1938	Brescia	25	(2)
1938–1940	Ambrosiana-Inter	6	(1)
1940–1941	Fano	16	(12)
1941–1942	L'Aquila		
1942–1943	Pisa	3	(0)
1945–1946	Arezzo	8	(0)
1946–1948	L'Aquila		
- * Club domestic league appearances and goals

Vittorio Rovelli (August 16, 1916 in Renate – 1996) was an Italian professional football player.

== Honours ==
- Serie A champion: 1939/40
- Coppa Italia winner: 1938/39
