= Giorgio Barsanti =

Italian footballer

Personal information
- Date of birth: 23 September 1918
- Place of birth: Viareggio, Italy
- Date of death: 11 November 1994 (aged 76)
- Height: 1.75 m (5 ft 9 in)
- Position: Striker

Senior career*
Years	Team	Apps	(Gls)
1935–1937	Viareggio	24	(6)
1937–1938	Genova 1893	14	(8)
1938–1941	Ambrosiana-Inter	27	(12)
1941	Lucchese	3	(0)
1941–1943	Cremonese	49	(22)
1943–1944	Trastevere	29	(3)
1945–1946	Internazionale	29	(3)
1946–1949	Sampdoria	60	(6)
1949–1952	Pro Patria	73	(6)
1952–1953	Vigevano	23	(3)
- * Club domestic league appearances and goals

Giorgio Barsanti (23 September 1918 – 11 November 1994) was an Italian football player.

== Honours ==
- Serie A champion: 1939/40
- Coppa Italia winner: 1938/39
