= Pietro Rebuzzi =

Italian footballer (born 1918)

Personal information
- Date of birth: October 31, 1918
- Place of birth: Bordighera, Italy
- Height: 1.79 m (5 ft 10 1/2 in)
- Position: Midfielder

Senior career*
Years	Team	Apps	(Gls)
1935–1937	Brescia	11	(0)
1937–1939	Fanfulla		
1939–1941	Ambrosiana-Inter	11	(5)
1941–1942	Fanfulla	30	(13)
1942–1944	Ambrosiana-Inter	11	(6)
1944–1945	Milano	2	(0)
1945–1946	Andrea Doria	20	(4)
1946–1948	Vicenza	50	(13)
1948–1949	Pro Palazzolo		
1949–1950	Vita Nova		
- * Club domestic league appearances and goals

Pietro Rebuzzi (born 31 October 31, 1918, in Bordighera, died 5 January 2000) was an Italian professional football player.

His younger brother Italo Rebuzzi also played football professionally. To distinguish them, Pietro was referred to as Rebuzzi I and Italo as Rebuzzi II.

== Honours ==
Inter Milan

- Serie A champion: 1939/40
