= Annibale Frossi =

Italian footballer (1911–1999)

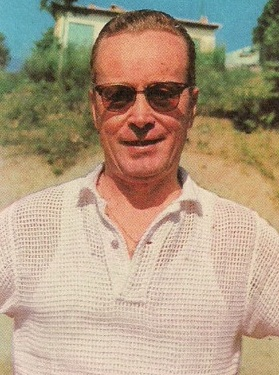

Personal information
- Date of birth: 6 July 1911
- Place of birth: Muzzana del Turgnano, Italy
- Date of death: 26 February 1999 (aged 87)
- Place of death: Milan, Italy
- Height: 1.70 m (5 ft 7 in)
- Position: Forward

Senior career*
Years	Team	Apps	(Gls)
1929–1931	Udinese	32	(0)
1931–1933	Padova	47	(10)
1933–1934	Bari	30	(12)
1934–1935	Padova	26	(14)
1935–1936	L'Aquila	34	(9)
1936–1942	Inter Milan	125	(40)
1942–1943	Pro Patria	24	(3)
1945	Como	5	(2)
Total		323	(90)

International career
1937	Italy B	1	(0)
1936–1937	Italy	5	(8)

Managerial career
- 1946–1948: Luino
- 1948–1949: Mortara
- 1949–1953: Monza
- 1954–1956: Torino
- 1956–1957: Inter Milan
- 1958–1959: Genoa
- 1959: Napoli
- 1960–1961: Genoa
- 1962–1964: Modena
- 1964–1965: Triestina
Medal record
Men's football
Representing Italy
Olympic Games
Gold medal – first place	1936 Berlin
- * Club domestic league appearances and goals

Annibale Frossi (Italian pronunciation: [anˈniːbale ˈfrɔssi]; 6 July 1911 – 26 February 1999) was an Italian football manager and player, who played as a forward.

Frossi is perhaps best known for wearing correctional glasses during his playing years after suffering from myopia from when he was a child. As a footballer, he was a member of the Italy national team, which won the gold medal in the football tournament at the 1936 Summer Olympics, finishing the tournament as top-scorer. As a manager, he is also known for his developments of the theory of catenaccio, which emphasises a defensive style of football.

== Club career ==
Born in Muzzana del Turgnano, Frossi began his career as a professional footballer with Udinese, and, after a long stay in Serie B (with Padova, Bari, and L’Aquila), he was acquired by Ambrosiana Inter, where he made his debut on 21 June 1936, in Mitropa Cup. After that, Frossi was called up for the 1936 Summer Olympics by Vittorio Pozzo, the coach of the Italy national side, leading the team to the victory of the tournament with his prolific performances. In the following years, Frossi played with Inter from 1936 until 1942, winning the “Scudetto” or league championship, twice in 1938 and 1940, as well as the Coppa Italia in 1939. He scored 49 goals in 147 matches with Inter, 40 of which came in the league, in 125 appearances. During World War II, he later also played with Pro Patria between 1942 and 1943, and Como in 1945, before retiring.

== International career ==
Frossi made five appearances for the Italy national team between 1936 and 1937, scoring eight goals. He was called up by the national team manager Vittorio Pozzo for the 1936 Summer Olympics in Berlin, where he made his international debut along with the other members of the Olympic team, scoring a goal in a 1–0 victory over the United States on 3 August; he helped Italy win the gold medal, scoring in all four matches in the competition including the final, finishing the tournament as top-scorer with seven goals. He also made one appearance for the Italy B-side in 1937, in a 3–2 win over Austria on 21 March. He made his final and only other appearance with Italy in a 2–0 win against Hungary on 25 April 1936, scoring a goal.

== Style of play ==
Frossi was an extremely fast right winger both with and without the ball, who possessed a keen eye for goal, which also made him capable of playing as a centre-forward. According to Gianni Brera, he was known in particular for his pace, energy, and coordination; he was not the most technically gifted footballer, however, and was also not particularly good in the air or acrobatically, as he needed to play with glasses due to his myopia. Vittorio Pozzo Described him as an excellent opportunist in the penalty area. Frossi was also known for his accurate shot and striking ability from outside the area, as well as his tactical intelligence, which made him an excellent executor of his team's set-plays.

== Managerial career ==
Shortly after hanging up his boots, Frossi became a coach, and became manager of a series of Italian clubs – Lumezzane, Genoa, Napoli, Monza, Torino, Modena, Triestina, and also Internazionale, without however producing any outstanding results. He was the creator of the 5–4–1 line up, and is associated (with others) with the development of the catenaccio or "lock-out" tactic in football. Frossi often declared that "the perfect result to a football game is 0–0. That is because it is an expression of the balance between the attacks and defences out on the field", with neither side evidently having made a mistake.

For his short (12 matches) tenure as coach at Internazionale, Frossi did the job jointly with manager Luigi Ferrero, a strong advocate of attacking football. Despite an 11 match unbeaten record, Inter dispensed with his services because of dissatisfaction with his tactical style and it seemed that Ferrero had won the battle of ideas, together with influential players such as Enzo Bearzot. Despite this, it was the defensive footballing theories of Frossi, Nereo Rocco and later Helenio Herrera which became dominant in Italian football for the 25 years or so after his time at Inter.

Like many intellectual struggles in Italy, the dispute between advocates of attacking and defensive football continued for years. In international terms, it is probably true that the advocates of a more balanced, attacking football have achieved more success, notably the A.C. Milan team of the late 80's and early 1990s managed by Arrigo Sacchi, and the 1982 FIFA World Cup winners of Enzo Bearzot.

== Beyond football ==
Frossi was a graduate of law. He later worked as a general manager for Alfa Romeo in the industrial sector, and then, in the last years of his life, he was a columnist for Italian newspaper Il Corriere della Sera in Milan. Frossi died on 27 February 1999, at the age of 87, at the San Raffaele Hospital in Milan, after contracting pneumonia. Following his death, in his home town of Udine, a city street near the local Friuli Stadium was named after him in his honour.

== Honours ==
=== Player ===
Inter Milan

- Serie A: 1937–38, 1939–40
- Coppa Italia: 1938–39

Italy

- Summer Olympic Gold Medal: 1936

Individual

- Olympic Golden Boot: 1936
