= Umberto Guarnieri =

Italian footballer

Personal information
- Date of birth: 2 May 1919
- Place of birth: Milan, Italy
- Date of death: 26 May 1973
- Height: 1.66 m (5 ft 5 1/2 in)
- Position: Striker

Senior career*
Years	Team	Apps	(Gls)
1936–1938	Comense	39	(29)
1938–1942	Ambrosiana-Inter	52	(25)
1942–1943	Padova	25	(15)
1943–1944	Cremonese	13	(2)
1944–1945	Milano	20	(6)
1945–1949	Legnano	129	(55)
1949–1953	Pro Patria	122	(26)
1953–1954	Brescia	16	(4)
1954–1955	Piacenza	27	(10)
- * Club domestic league appearances and goals

Umberto Guarnieri (2 May 1919 in Milan – 26 May 1973) was an Italian professional football player.

== Honours ==
Inter

- Serie A champion: 1939/40
- Coppa Italia winner: 1938/39
