= 1938–39 Coppa Italia =

Tournament details
- Country: Italy
- Dates: 3 Sept 1938 – 18 May 1939
- Teams: 140

Final positions
- Champions: Ambrosiana-Inter (1st title)
- Runners-up: Novara

Tournament statistics
- Matches played: 157
- Goals scored: 509 (3.24 per match)
- Top goal scorer(s): Alberto Marchetti (11 goals)

The 1938–39 Coppa Italia was the sixth edition of the national cup in Italian football, and the fourth edition of the tournament organized by the Direttorio Divisioni Superiori. The competition was won by Ambrosiana-Inter.

== Serie C elimination round ==
Serie C qualifying and preliminary rounds were under geographical zones.

Home team	Score	Away team
Audace	2-2 (aet)	Vicenza
Grion Pola	1-2	ARSA
Ponziana	1-2	Ampelea Isola
Pro Gorizia	3-3 (aet)	Monfalcone
Treviso	1-0	Udinese
Marzotto Valdagno	6-1	Mestre
Carpi	2-3	Parma
Pavese	0-1 (aet)	Derthona
Lecco	4-3 (aet)	Cantù
Reggiana	1-0	Caratese
Monza	6-0	Cremonese
Falck	1-0	Casalini
Legnano	2-2 (aet)	FIAT
Brescia	2-0	Crema
Como	3-1	Marchetti Sestese
Juventus Domo	1-2	Pro Patria
Varese	1-0	Gallaratese
Seregno	3-0	Cusiana
Pinerolo	2-1	Asti
Tigullia	0-2	Manlio Cavagnaro
Cuneo	1-3	Imperia
Entella	2-2 (aet)	Andrea Doria
Albingaunia	1-3	Acqui
Empoli	3-1	Vincenzo Benini
Forlimpopoli	4-2	Baracca Lugo
Grosseto	1-0	Signe
Molinella	3-2	Forlì
Macerata	5-1	Ascoli
Gubbio	0-6	Jesi
Vis Pesaro	8-1	Sambenedettese
Perugia	3-0	Tiferno
Borzacchini	4-1	Aeronautica Umbra
Supertessile Rieti	2-0	Pescara
Savoia	2-1	Bagnolese
Brindisi	1-0	Taranto
Taranto	3-2	Lecce
Vado	2-0	Centrale del Latte Genova
Arezzo	0-2	Prato
SAFFA Fucecchio	0-2	Pistoiese
Libertas Rimini	0-2	Alma Juventus Fano
Catania	0-2	Palmese
Cerignola	0-2	Stabia
Foggia	0-2	Manfredonia
La Dominante	2-0	Messina

Replay matches

Home team	Score	Away team
Vicenza	6-0	Audace
Monfalcone	1-2	Pro Gorizia
FIAT	1-3	Legnano
Andrea Doria	1-2	Entella

== First round ==
20 clubs were added (Piacenza, Mantova, Rovigo, Fiumana, Alfa Romeo, Biellese, Ilva Savona, Valpolcevera, Molinella, Pontedera, Ravenna, Civitavecchia, Aquila, MATER, Simaz Popoli, Cagliari, Cosenza, Potenza, Juventus Siderno, and Palmese).

Home team	Score	Away team
Piacenza	1-2	Mantova
Ampelea Isola	1-1 (aet)	ARSA
Rovigo	4-2	Pro Gorizia
Marzotto Valdagno	1-2	Vicenza
Treviso	3-1	Fiumana
Brescia	1-0	Alfa Romeo
Monza	5-0	Derthona
Reggiana	2-1 (aet)	Parma
Lecco	0-1	Falck
Biellese	8-2	Legnano
Ilva Savona	4-3	Acqui
Varese	2-1	Pro Patria
Seregno	1-0	Como
Manlio Cavagnaro	5-1	Entella
Imperia	2-1	Pinerolo
Valpolcevera	4-2	Vado
Pistoiese	0-0 (aet)	Molinella
Prato	2-0	Empoli
Ravenna	7-0	Forlimpopoli
Pontedera	1-0	Grosseto
Alma Juventus Fano	1-0	Macerata
Civitavecchia	1-0	Supertessile Rieti
Jesi	1-2 (aet)	Vis Pesaro
Borzacchini	1-1 (aet)	Perugia
Aquila	2-2 (aet)	MATER
Simaz Popoli	3-1	Manfredonia
Cagliari	2-0	San Giorgio
Stabia	3-0	Savoia
Taranto	2-0	Brindisi
Cosenza	1-2	Potenza
Juventus Siderno	2-0	Palmese
Siracusa	0-2	La Dominante

Replay matches

Home team	Score	Away team
ARSA	2-1 (aet)	Ampelea Isola
Molinella	2-0	Pistoiese
Perugia	0-2	Borzacchini
MATER	7-0	Aquila

== Second Round ==
Home team	Score	Away team
Treviso	5-1	ARSA
Mantova	1-1 (aet)	Monza
Reggiana	1-1 (aet)	Brescia
Vicenza	6-3	Rovigo
Varese	0-2	Biellese
Seregno	3-1	Falck
Valpolcevera	1-0	Manlio Cavagnaro
Ilva Savona	0-1	Imperia
Ravenna	1-2	Molinella
Prato	6-0	Pontedera
Vis Pesaro	1-0	Alma Juventus Fano
Civitavecchia	3-2	Cagliari
Borzacchini	0-0 (aet)	Simaz Popoli
Taranto	1-0	Potenza
Juventus Siderno	1-0	La Dominante
Stabia	1-1 (aet)	MATER

Replay matches

Home team	Score	Away team
Monza	4-2	Mantova
Brescia	1-0	Reggiana
Simaz Popoli	3-0	Borzacchini
MATER	4-5 (aet)	Stabia

== Serie B elimination round ==
Home team	Score	Away team
Fanfulla	1-2	Vigevano
Fiorentina	4-0	Hellas Verona

== Third round ==
16 Serie B clubs were added (Padova, Vigevano, Fiorentina, Atalanta, Casale, Venezia, Pro Vercelli, Alessandria, Sanremese, Spezia, Anconitana-Bianchi, SPAL, Pisa, Siena, Salernitana, and Palermo).

Home team	Score	Away team
Padova	3-1	Vigevano
Prato	2-2 (aet)	Fiorentina
Vicenza	2-1	Treviso
Atalanta	3-1	Seregno
Biellese	2-1	Casale
Brescia	0-1	Venezia
Monza	3-2	Valpolcevera
Pro Vercelli	4-3	Alessandria
Imperia	2-1	Sanremese
Spezia	1-0	Molinella
Anconitana-Bianchi	6-1	SPAL
Vis Pesaro	1-0	Pisa
Siena	2-3 (aet)	Civitavecchia
Stabia	0-1	Simaz Popoli
Taranto	2-3 (aet)	Salernitana
Juventus Siderno	0-0 (aet)	Palermo

Replay matches

Home team	Score	Away team
Fiorentina	1-0	Prato
Palermo	3-0	Juventus Siderno

== Round of 32 ==
16 Serie A clubs were added (Triestina, Bologna, Roma, Lucchese, Juventus, Genova 1893, Novara, Liguria, Torino, Milano, Livorno, Napoli, Ambrosiana-Inter, Modena, Bari, and Lazio).

Home team	Score	Away team
Triestina	1-0 (aet)	Bologna
Vis Pesaro	0-4	Roma
Monza	2-0	Civitavecchia
Biellese	2-1	Lucchese
Padova	1-3	Juventus
Genova 1893	5-2	Fiorentina
Pro Vercelli	1-1 (aet)	Novara
Simaz Popoli	3-2 (aet)	Liguria
Spezia	0-1	Venezia
Torino	2-1	Imperia
Milano	4-0	Anconitana-Bianchi
Livorno	2-1	Salernitana
Napoli	1-1 (aet)	Ambrosiana-Inter
Modena	3-2 (aet)	Bari
Palermo	2-1 (aet)	Vicenza
Lazio	1-0	Atalanta

Replay matches

Home team	Score	Away team
Novara	2-0	Pro Vercelli
Ambrosiana-Inter	1-0	Napoli

== Round of 16 ==
Home team	Score	Away team
Juventus	0-1	Genova 1893
Livorno	0-1 (aet)	Ambrosiana-Inter
Roma	2-1	Triestina
Monza	2-1	Biellese
Milano	2-1	Lazio
Simaz Popoli	0-1	Novara
Modena	3-0	Palermo
Venezia	3-2	Torino

== Quarter-finals ==
Home team	Score	Away team
Monza	1-2	Genova 1893
Ambrosiana-Inter	1-0	Roma
Venezia	1-2	Milano
Novara	3-0	Modena

== Semi-finals ==
Home team	Score	Away team
Genova 1893	1-3 (aet)	Ambrosiana-Inter
Novara	3-2	Milano

== Final ==
18 May 1939

Ambrosiana-Inter	2–1	Novara
P.Ferraris 8'; Frossi 26'		Romano 59'

Stadio Nazionale, Rome

== Top goalscorers ==
Rank	Player	Club	Goals
1	(Italy) Alberto Marchetti	Vicenza	11
2	(Italy) Riccardo Colombo	Monza	6
3	(Italy) Ettore Brossi	MATER	5
3	(Italy) Natale Cereda	Legnano	5
3	(Italy) Luigi Gelosa	Monza	5
3	(Italy) Fiorano Grassi	Monza	5
3	(Italy) Paolucci	Manlio Cavagnaro	5
3	(Italy) Mario Spagnoli	Prato	5
