= 1939–40 Serie A =

39th season of top-tier Italian football

Serie A
- Season: 1939–40
- Champions: Ambrosiana-Inter; 5th title
- Relegated: Liguria; Modena
- Matches played: 240
- Goals scored: 625 (2.6 per match)
- Top goalscorer: Aldo Boffi (24 goals)

The 1939-40 Serie A was the fortieth edition of the Italian Football Championship and the eleventh since 1929 re-branding to create Serie A. It was the seventeenth season from which the Italian Football Champions adorned their team jerseys in the subsequent season with a Scudetto. Ambrosiana-Inter were champions for the fifth time in their history. This was their third scudetto since the scudetto started being awarded in 1924 and their third win contested as Serie A. This was a second punctuation by Inter in the run of four Bologna wins from six consecutive Serie A competitions until 1941.

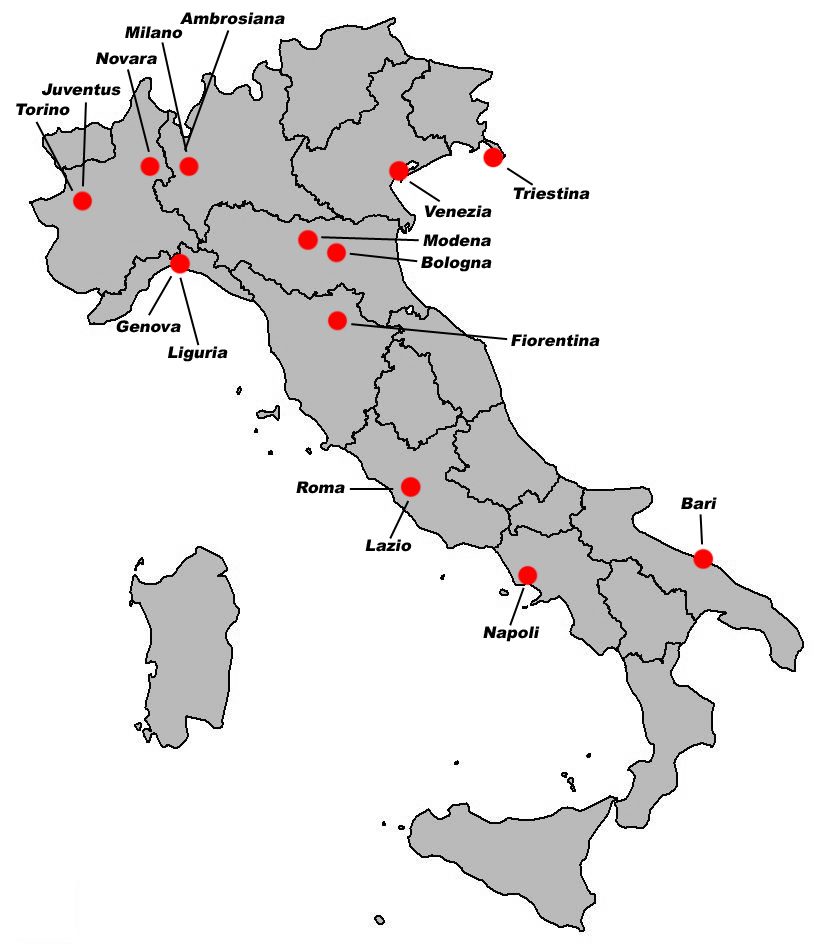
Serie A 1939-40 teams distribution

== Teams ==
Fiorentina and Venezia had been promoted from Serie B.

== Final classification ==
Pos	Team	Pld	W	D	L	GF	GA	GR	Pts	Qualification or relegation
1	Ambrosiana-Inter (C)	30	20	4	6	56	23	2.435	44	
2	Bologna	30	16	9	5	44	23	1.913	41	
3	Juventus	30	15	6	9	45	40	1.125	36	
4	Lazio	30	12	11	7	44	36	1.222	35	
5	Genova 1893	30	14	5	11	56	47	1.191	33	
6	Torino	30	13	7	10	47	41	1.146	33	
7	Roma	30	11	7	12	28	31	0.903	29	
8	Milano	30	10	8	12	46	38	1.211	28	
9	Novara	30	12	3	15	27	35	0.771	27	
10	Venezia	30	10	7	13	34	46	0.739	27	
11	Bari	30	9	9	12	33	46	0.717	27	
12	Triestina	30	10	6	14	38	43	0.884	26	
13	Fiorentina	30	9	6	15	37	48	0.771	24	
14	Napoli	30	9	6	15	26	41	0.634	24	
15	Liguria (R)	30	7	10	13	25	44	0.568	24	Relegation to Serie B
16	Modena (R)	30	7	8	15	39	43	0.907	22	Relegation to Serie B

Source: goal average officially used in event of equal points.
(C) Champions; (R) Relegated

== Results ==
Home \ Away	AMB	BAR	BOL	FIO	GEN	JUV	LAZ	LIG	MIL	MOD	NAP	NOV	ROM	TOR	TRI	VEN
Ambrosiana-Inter		0–0	1–0	3–0	2–1	4–0	4–0	1–0	0–3	2–1	4–0	1–0	3–0	5–1	5–1	2–1
Bari	3–0		1–1	2–1	0–1	2–1	1–5	1–1	2–0	1–0	1–0	1–0	0–0	2–2	2–2	3–0
Bologna	0–0	3–1		3–2	5–3	1–0	3–1	2–0	1–0	1–0	1–1	3–0	1–0	3–1	2–0	2–0
Fiorentina	0–3	1–1	1–0		1–1	0–0	2–3	4–0	1–0	3–2	2–0	2–2	1–0	3–2	1–0	3–1
Genova 1893	2–2	3–0	1–2	3–0		3–2	4–0	2–0	1–1	0–3	2–0	5–3	0–0	1–0	1–0	3–1
Juventus	1–0	6–2	1–0	3–2	3–1		3–1	4–0	2–2	1–0	2–1	1–0	1–1	1–1	2–6	1–0
Lazio	1–1	0–1	2–2	1–1	4–1	4–0		2–2	2–2	1–1	2–0	1–0	1–0	1–1	2–0	1–0
Liguria	0–2	1–0	1–1	2–1	2–1	0–2	0–0		0–2	1–1	2–0	1–0	1–0	2–1	1–1	0–0
Milano	1–3	4–0	0–2 (Note: Decided by the FIGC.)	3–1	2–2	1–2	0–2	1–1		4–0	3–0	0–2	3–0	1–3	0–0	2–1
Modena	1–2	3–0	0–0	3–0	1–4	1–2	1–1	1–1	2–2		0–0	4–1	1–0	1–2	2–1	2–2
Napoli	0–1	1–1	1–1	2–1	3–1	0–0	1–1	3–2	1–4	1–0		2–1	0–1	3–1	3–1	2–0
Novara	1–0	1–0	0–0	2–1	3–1	1–0	0–0	1–0	1–0	1–0	0–1		1–0	0–1	2–1	2–0
Roma	1–2	4–2	2–0	0–0	2–0	3–1	1–0	2–2	3–1	1–0	1–0	3–1		0–0	1–0	0–2
Torino	0–1	2–2	2–1	2–1	3–1	1–2	0–1	3–0	2–1	4–3	1–0	1–0	4–0		3–1	0–0
Triestina	2–1	1–0	0–2	2–1	0–1	1–0	2–3	3–1	1–1	4–1	2–0	2–0	1–0	2–2		0–0
Venezia	2–1	2–1	1–1	2–0	2–6	1–1	2–1	2–1	0–2	0–4	2–0	3–1	2–2	2–1	3–1	

Source: Almanacco Illustrato del Calcio - La Storia 1898-2004, Panini Edizioni, Modena, September 2005 (in Italian)
Legend: Blue = home team win; Yellow = draw; Red = away team win.

== Top goalscorers ==
Rank	Player	Club	Goals
1	(Italy) Aldo Boffi	Milano	24
2	(Italy) Umberto Guarnieri	Ambrosiana-Inter	15
3	(Uruguay) (Italy) Ettore Puricelli	Bologna	14
3	(Italy) Carlo Reguzzoni	Bologna	14
5	(Italy) Ugo Conti	Genova 1893	13
5	(Italy) Guglielmo Gabetto	Juventus	13
7	(Italy) Attilio Demaría	Ambrosiana-Inter	12
8	(Italy) Bruno Arcari	Genova 1893	11
9	(Italy) Vittorio Sentimenti	Modena	10
9	(Uruguay) Giovanni Alberti	Venezia	10
9	(Argentina) Michelangelo Pantò	Roma	10
9	(Italy) Danilo Michelini	Torino	10

== References and sources ==
- Almanacco Illustrato del Calcio - La Storia 1898-2004, Panini Edizioni, Modena, September 2005
