= 1937–38 AS Ambrosiana-Inter season =

Associazione Sportiva Ambrosiana-Inter
1937-38 season
- President: Ferdinando Pozzani
- Manager: Armando Castellazzi
- Stadium: Arena Civica
- Serie A: 1st (in 1938 Mitropa Cup)
- Coppa Italia: Semifinals
- Mitropa Cup: Quarterfinals
- Top goalscorer: League: Meazza (20); All: Meazza (30)
Home colours

During the 1937–38 season Associazione Sportiva Ambrosiana-Inter competed in Serie A, Coppa Italia and Mitropa Cup.

== Summary ==
The club started Serie A with a surprising 3–3 draw at Lucca. In the ninth round, l'Ambrosiana, managed by Armando Castellazzi, reached the top of the table by defeating Juventus. In the 15th round, the squad won the symbolic campione d'inverno by 4 points over Bologna. The second part of the season opened with a massive high scoring win against Lucchese; however in round 22 Juventus managed to overtake the club. Inter fought back to retake the advantage by 2 points the following Sunday. Then Inter managed to widen the gap to 3 points in round 26, after their match against Liguria. Following Inter's draw against Liguria, Juventus lost its own game against Trieste and then failed to beat Liguria themselves. All of which meant, Ambrosiana remained top going into the last round of games with 39 points, followed by Juventus with 38 and Bologna. The squad clinched the title in the final round of games, winning their match against Bari.

Ambrosiana beat Bari convincingly with Meazza scoring five goals in the 9–2 victory. The next week, he scored a hat-trick against Lucchese. Along with his fellow Inter players Ferraris II, Ferrari, and Locatelli, Meazza was involved in the Azzurri set-up that won the 1938 World Cup in Paris. At 33 years old, Castellazzi became the youngest manager to ever win the scudetto, a record that still remains to this day.

That season, the club also put in a strong showing in the Coppa Italia, where they were only stopped by a 2-0 defeat in the semifinals by eventual champions Juventus. In Mitropa Cup the team advanced to the Quarterfinals, where they were defeated by Slavia Prague over two legs,(0-9; 3–1). The 9 goals defeat still stands as an infamous record of the worst loss in a game.

== Squad ==
Note: Flags indicate national team as defined under FIFA eligibility rules; some limited exceptions apply. Players may hold more than one non-FIFA nationality.

Pos.	Nation	Player
GK	ITA	Giuseppe Peruchetti
DF	ITA	Giuseppe Ballerio
DF	ITA	Carmelo Buonocore
DF	ITA	Emilio Gattoronchieri
DF	ITA	Ugo Locatelli
DF	ITA	Costantino Sala
DF	ITA	Duilio Setti
MF	ITA	Aldo Campatelli
MF	ITA	Enrico Candiani
MF	ITA	Giovanni Ferrari
MF	ITA	Piero Colli

Pos.	Nation	Player
MF	ITA	Nicola Ferrara (I)
MF	ITA	Ezio Meneghello
MF	ITA	Renato Olmi
MF	ITA	Sandro Puppo
FW	ITA	Piero Antona
FW	ITA	Antonio Bisigato
FW	ITA	Antonio Ferrara (II)
FW	ITA	Pietro Ferraris (II)
FW	ITA	Annibale Frossi
FW	ITA	Giuseppe Meazza

=== Added players for Mitropa Cup ===
Note: Flags indicate national team as defined under FIFA eligibility rules; some limited exceptions apply. Players may hold more than one non-FIFA nationality.

Pos.	Nation	Player
MF	ITA	Lorenzo Suber
MF	ITA	Bruno Vale
FW	ITA	Giorgio Barsanti

== Competitions ==
=== Serie A ===
==== League table ====
Pos	Team	Pld	W	D	L	GF	GA	GD	Pts	Qualification or relegation
1	Ambrosiana-Inter (C)	30	16	9	5	57	28	+29	41	1938 Mitropa Cup
2	Juventus	30	14	11	5	43	22	+21	39	1938 Mitropa Cup
3	Genova 1893	30	15	8	7	50	35	+15	38	1938 Mitropa Cup
4	Milan	30	13	12	5	43	27	+16	38	1938 Mitropa Cup
5	Bologna	30	14	9	7	46	34	+12	37	

Source: Panini. Genoa 3rd by draw.
(C) Champions

==== Position by round ====
Round	1	2	3	4	5	6	7	8	9	10	11	12	13	14	15	16	17	18	19	20	21	22	23	24	25	26	27	28	29	30
Ground	A	H	A	H	A	A	H	A	H	H	A	H	A	H	A	H	A	H	A	H	H	A	H	A	A	H	A	H	A	H
Result	D	W	D	W	L	W	W	D	W	W	W	D	W	D	W	W	D	L	W	W	L	D	D	L	W	L	W	D	W	W
Position	5	3	4	2	4	3	2	3	1	1	1	1	1	1	1	1	1	1	1	1	1	1	1	2	2	2	2	2	1	1

Source: Competitive matches
A = Away; H = Home; W = Win; D = Draw; L = Loss; = Leader, 1938 Mitropa Cup; = 1938 Mitropa Cup

==== Matches ====
Win Draw Loss

12 September 1937 1	Lucchese	3–3	Ambrosiana-Inter	Lucca
	Rosellini 30'; Romagnoli 62'; Coppa 90'	Report	45' Ferraris II; 59' Meazza; 66' Ferrara II	Stadium: Stadio Porta Elisa; Referee: Giuseppe Scarpi

19 September 1937 2	Ambrosiana-Inter	3–1	Livorno	Milan
	Del Buono 36' (o.g.); Ferraris II 50'; Ferrari 73'	Report	2' Neri II	Stadium: Arena Civica; Referee: Emiliano Saracini

26 September 1937 3	Triestina	1–1	Ambrosiana-Inter	Trieste
	Trevisan 46'	Report	52' Frossi	Stadium: Stadio Littorio; Referee: Raffaele Scorzoni

3 October 1937 4	Ambrosiana-Inter	5–1	Fiorentina	Milan
	Meazza 6', 73' (pen.); Frossi 18', 90'; Ferrara I 88'	Report	33' Viani II	Stadium: Arena Civica; Referee: Mario Ciamberlini

10 October 1937 5	Bologna	1–0	Ambrosiana-Inter	Bologna
	Reguzzoni 64'	Report		Stadium: Stadio Littoriale; Referee: Giacomo Bertolio

17 October 1937 6	Ambrosiana-Inter	2–1	Milano	Milan
	Ferraris II 13'; Ferrari 24'	Report	84' Capra	Stadium: Arena Civica; Referee: Zelocchi

24 October 1937 7	Ambrosiana-Inter	2–1	Napoli	Milan
	Meazza 30'; Castello 75' (o.g.)	Report	34' Nicolosi	Stadium: Arena Civica; Referee: Galeati

7 November 1937 8	Genoa	1–1	Ambrosiana-Inter	Genoa
	Servetti 44'	Report	35' Ferraris II	Stadium: Stadio Luigi Ferraris; Referee: Giuseppe Scarpi

14 November 1937 9	Ambrosiana-Inter	2–1	Juventus	Milan
	Ferraris II 55'; Ferrari 81'	Report	63' (pen.) Foni	Stadium: Arena Civica; Referee: Renzo Curradi

21 November 1937 10	Lazio	1–3	Ambrosiana-Inter	Rome
	Busani 55' (pen.)	Report	4' Ferraris II; 50' Meazza; 81' Ferrara I	Stadium: Stadio Nazionale del PNF; Referee: Raffaele Scorzoni

28 November 1937 11	Ambrosiana-Inter	2–1	Liguria	Milan
	Ferraris II 29', 87'	Report	65' Bollano	Stadium: Arena Civica; Referee: Emiliano Saracini

12 December 1937 12	Atalanta	1–1	Ambrosiana-Inter	Bergamo
	Cominelli 63'	Report	68' Ferrari	Stadium: Stadio Mario Brumana; Referee: Mario Ciamberlini

19 December 1937 13	Ambrosiana-Inter	1–0	Torino	Milan
	Meazza 21'	Report		Stadium: Arena Civica; Referee: Raffaele Scorzoni

2 January 1938 14	Roma	1–1	Ambrosiana-Inter	Rome
	Serantoni 53'	Report	39' Ferraris II	Stadium: Stadio Nazionale del PNF; Referee: Mario Ciamberlini

9 January 1938 15	Ambrosiana-Inter	9–2	Bari	Milan
	Ferrara II 8', 66'; Ferrara I 16'; Meazza 19', 34', 61', 77', 86'; Ferraris II 21'	Report	24' Cason; 43' Mancini	Stadium: Arena Civica; Referee: Francesco Mattea

16 January 1938 16	Ambrosiana-Inter	4–0	Lucchese	Milan
	Ferrari 3'; Meazza 15', 36', 69'	Report		Stadium: Arena Civica; Referee: Mario Scotto

23 January 1938 17	Livorno	0–0	Ambrosiana-Inter	Livorno
		Report		Stadium: Stadio Edda Ciano Mussolini; Referee: Giuseppe Scarpi

30 January 1938 18	Ambrosiana-Inter	1–2	Triestina	Milan
	Meazza 56' (pen.)	Report	42' (pen.), 76' Trevisan	Stadium: Arena Civica; Referee: Attilio Soliani

6 February 1938 19	Fiorentina	0–3	Ambrosiana-Inter	Florence
		Report	26', 55', 87' Ferraris II	Stadium: Stadio Giovanni Berta; Referee: Francesco Mattea

13 February 1938 20	Ambrosiana-Inter	2–0	Bologna	Milan
	Meazza 11', 86'	Report		Stadium: Arena Civica; Referee: Generoso Dattilo

20 February 1938 21	Milano	1–0	Ambrosiana-Inter	Milan
	Capra 80'	Report		Stadium: Campo San Siro; Referee: Giuseppe Scarpi

27 February 1938 22	Napoli	1–1	Ambrosiana-Inter	Naples
	Buscaglia 75' (pen.)	Report	72' Meazza	Stadium: Stadio Partenopeo; Referee: Gino Mazzarini

6 March 1938 23	Ambrosiana-Inter	0–0	Genoa	Milan
		Report		Stadium: Arena Civica; Referee: Raffaele Scorzoni

13 March 1938 24	Juventus	2–1	Ambrosiana-Inter	Turin
	Bellini 14'; Gabetto 65'	Report	24' Ferrari	Stadium: Stadio Benito Mussolini; Referee: Dattilo

20 March 1938 25	Ambrosiana-Inter	3–1	Lazio	Milan
	Frossi 8'; Meazza 41'; Ferrari 44' (pen.)	Report	81' Busani	Stadium: Arena Civica; Referee: Aniello Mazza

27 March 1938 26	Liguria	3–1	Ambrosiana-Inter	Genoa
	Bollano 35'; Callegari 75'; Peretti 83'	Report	77' (o.g.) Callegari	Stadium: Stadio del Littorio; Referee: Generoso Dattilo

3 April 1938 27	Ambrosiana-Inter	1–0	Atalanta	Milan
	Ferraris II 75'	Report		Stadium: Arena Civica; Referee: Mario Scotto

10 April 1938 28	Torino	1–1	Ambrosiana-Inter	Turin
	Baldi III 82'	Report	71' Ferrari	Stadium: Stadio Filadelfia; Referee: Raffaele Scorzoni

17 April 1938 29	Ambrosiana-Inter	1–0	Roma	Milan
	Ferrari 29'	Report		Stadium: Arena Civica; Referee: Giuseppe Zelocchi

24 April 1938 30	Bari	0–2	Ambrosiana-Inter	Bari
		Report	70' Meazza; 89' Frossi	Stadium: Stadio della Vittoria; Referee: Generoso Dattilo

=== Coppa Italia ===
==== Round of 32 ====
5 December 1937	Ambrosiana-Inter	5–2	Vicenza	Milan
	Meazza 10', 30', 62', 87'; Colli 65'		40' Menti II; 67' Rossi	Stadium: Arena Civica; Referee: Rosso

==== Eightfinals ====
26 December 1937	Ambrosiana-Inter	5–1	Bari	Milan
	Meazza 4', 23', 29' (pen.); Ferraris II 59', 70'		46' Duè	Stadium: Arena Civica; Referee: Moretti

==== Quarterfinals ====
6 January 1938	Napoli	0–2	Ambrosiana-Inter	Naples
			11' Meazza; 22' Frossi	Stadium: Stadio Partenopeo; Referee: Giuseppe Zelocchi

==== Semifinals ====
21 April 1938	Juventus	2–0	Ambrosiana-Inter	Turin
	Tomasi 36'; Foni 86' (pen.)			Stadium: Stadio Benito Mussolini; Referee: Mario Ciamberlini

=== Mitropa Cup ===
==== Eightfinals ====
26 June 1938	Ambrosiana-Inter	4–2	(Hungary) Honved	Milan
	Ferraris II 67', 76'; Meazza 75'; Ferrari 81'		19' Déri; 21' Olajkár	Stadium: Arena Civica; Referee: Xifando

2 July 1938	(Hungary) Honved	1–1	Ambrosiana-Inter	Budapest
	Varga 66'		40' (pen.) Meazza	Stadium: Üllői úti stadion Referee: (Czechoslovakia) Gustav Krist

==== Quarterfinals ====
11 July 1938	(Czechoslovakia) Slavia Praha	9–0	Ambrosiana-Inter	Prague
	Bican 32', 54', 60', 69'; Horák 34', 61'; Vytlačil 48', 74'; Bradáč 59'			Stadium: Stadión Slavia; Referee: (Hungary) von Hertzka

17 July 1938	Ambrosiana-Inter	3–1	(Czechoslovakia) Slavia Praha	Milan
	Ferrari 27', 90'; Frossi 56'		25' Vytlačil	Stadium: Arena Civica; Referee: (Hungary) Ivancsics

== Statistics ==
=== Squad statistics ===
Competition	Points	Home						Away						Total						GD
Competition	Points	G	W	D	L	Gs	Gs	G	W	D	L	Gs	Gs	G	W	D	L	Gs	Gs	GD
Serie A	41	15	13	1	1	38	11	15	3	8	4	19	17	30	16	9	5	57	28	+ 29
Coppa Italia	-	2	2	0	0	10	3	2	1	0	1	2	2	4	3	0	1	12	5	+ 7
Mitropa Cup	-	2	2	0	0	8	2	2	0	1	1	1	10	4	2	1	1	9	12	3
Total	-	19	17	1	1	56	16	19	4	9	6	22	29	38	21	10	7	78	45	+ 33

=== Players statistics ===
No.	Pos	Nat	Player	Total		1937–38 Serie A		other	
No.	Pos	Nat	Player	Apps	Goals	Apps	Goals	Apps	Goals
	GK	(Italy) ITA	Giuseppe Peruchetti	38	-46	30	-28	8	-18
	DF	(Italy) ITA	Duilio Setti	31	0	26	0	5	0
	DF	(Italy) ITA	Carmelo Buonocore	34	0	29	0	5	0
	DF	(Italy) ITA	Ugo Locatelli	34	0	30	0	4	0
	MF	(Italy) ITA	Renato Olmi	35	0	30	0	5	0
	MF	(Italy) ITA	Giovanni Ferrari	35	12	30	9	5	3
	MF	(Italy) ITA	Nicola Ferrara	18	4	18	4		
	FW	(Italy) ITA	Piero Antona	31	0	28	0	3	0
	FW	(Italy) ITA	Pietro Ferraris	36	18	30	14	6	4
	FW	(Italy) ITA	Annibale Frossi	26	7	22	5	4	2
	FW	(Italy) ITA	Giuseppe Meazza	34	30	26	20	8	10
	FW	(Italy) ITA	Antonio Ferrara	15	3	10	1	5	2
	MF	(Italy) ITA	Aldo Campatelli	10	0	6	0	4	0
	MF	(Italy) ITA	Piero Colli	9	1	5	0	4	1
	DF	(Italy) ITA	Giuseppe Ballerio	8	0	4	0	4	0
	MF	(Italy) ITA	Enrico Candiani	5	0	5	0		
	DF	(Italy) ITA	Costantino Sala	4	0	2	0	2	0
	DF	(Italy) ITA	Emilio Gattoronchieri	3	0	1	0	2	0
	FW	(Italy) ITA	Antonio Bisigato	2	0	2	0		
	MF	(Italy) ITA	Ezio Meneghello	2	0	1	0	1	0
	MF	(Italy) ITA	Sandro Puppo	2	0	2	0		
		(Italy) ITA	Giorgio Barsanti	1	0	1	0		
		(Italy) ITA	Lorenzo Suber	1	0	1	0		
		(Italy) ITA	Bruno Vale	1	0	1	0		

- Source: http://calcio-seriea.net/presenze/1937/148/

== See also ==
- Corriere dello Sport - Stadio Il Littoriale, years 1937 and 1938.
- La Stampa, years 1937 and 1938.

== Bibliography ==
- Fabrizio Melegari. Almanacco illustrato del calcio - La storia 1898-2004, Modena. Panini, 2004.
- Stadio Il Littoriale, years 1939 and 1940. Corriere dello Sport..
- Carlo F. Chiesa. Il grande romanzo dello scudetto. Panini.
