= 1937–38 Serie A =

37th season of top-tier Italian football

Serie A
- Season: 1937–38
- Champions: Ambrosiana-Inter; 4th title
- Relegated: Atalanta; Fiorentina
- Matches: 240
- Goals: 617 (2.57 per match)
- Top goalscorer: Giuseppe Meazza (20 goals)

The 1937-38 Serie A was the thirty-eighth edition of the Italian Football Championship and its ninth since 1929 re-branding to create Serie A. It was the fifteenth season from which the Italian Football Champions adorned their team jerseys in the subsequent season with a Scudetto. Ambrosiana-Inter were champions for the fourth time in their history. This was their second scudetto since the scudetto started being awarded in 1924 and their second win contested as Serie A. This was the first of two Inter punctuations of a run of four Bologna wins from six consecutive Serie A competitions until 1941.

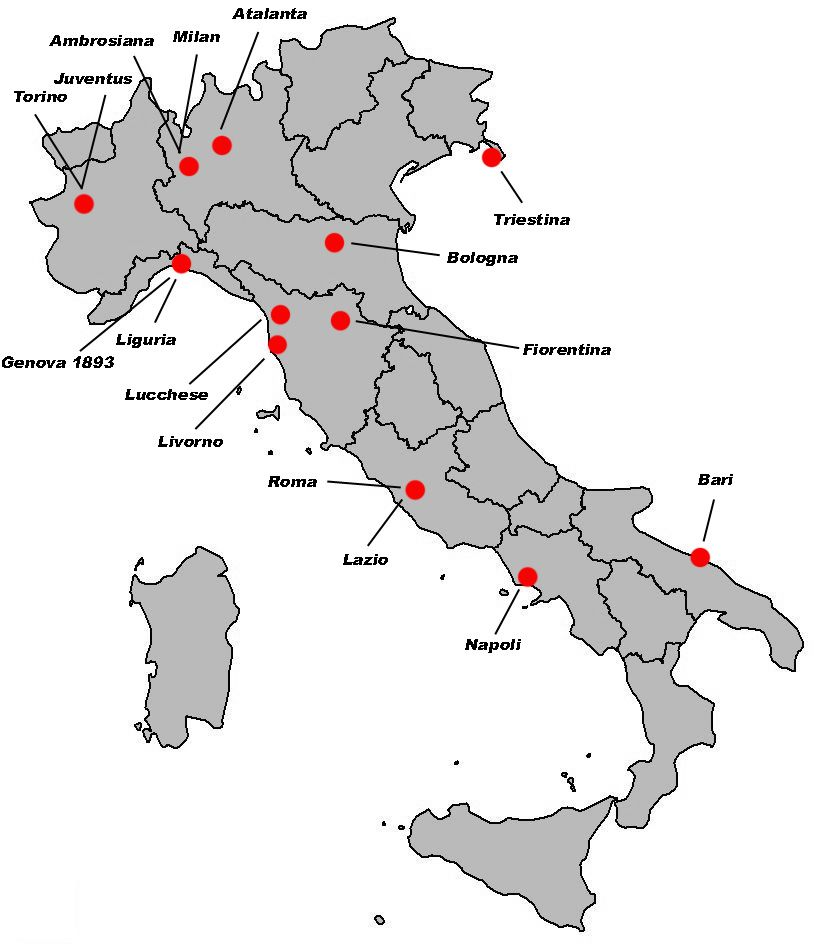
Serie A 1937-38 teams distribution

== Teams ==
Livorno and Atalanta had been promoted from Serie B.

== Final classification ==
Pos	Team	Pld	W	D	L	GF	GA	GD	Pts	Qualification or relegation
1	Ambrosiana-Inter (C)	30	16	9	5	57	28	+29	41	1938 Mitropa Cup
2	Juventus	30	14	11	5	43	22	+21	39	1938 Mitropa Cup
3	Genova 1893	30	15	8	7	50	35	+15	38	1938 Mitropa Cup
4	Milan	30	13	12	5	43	27	+16	38	1938 Mitropa Cup
5	Bologna	30	14	9	7	46	34	+12	37	
6	Triestina	30	12	12	6	35	22	+13	36	
6	Roma	30	14	8	8	44	31	+13	36	
8	Lazio	30	11	10	9	48	30	+18	32	
8	Torino	30	12	8	10	39	37	+2	32	
10	Napoli	30	8	12	10	37	39	−2	28	
11	Liguria	30	8	8	14	33	42	−9	24	
11	Livorno	30	8	8	14	29	45	−16	24	
13	Bari	30	8	7	15	35	60	−25	23	
14	Lucchese	30	5	11	14	28	55	−27	21	
15	Atalanta (R)	30	4	8	18	22	50	−28	16	Relegation to Serie B
16	Fiorentina (R)	30	3	9	18	28	60	−32	15	Relegation to Serie B

Source: Panini. Genoa 3rd by draw.
(C) Champions; (R) Relegated

== Results ==
Home \ Away	AMB	ATA	BAR	BOL	FIO	GEN	JUV	LAZ	LIG	LIV	LUC	MIL	NAP	ROM	TOR	TRI
Ambrosiana-Inter		1–0	9–2	2–0	5–1	0–0	2–1	3–1	2–1	3–1	4–0	2–1	2–1	1–0	1–0	1–2
Atalanta	1–1		0–0	1–2	1–1	3–4	0–1	0–0	2–0	1–3	1–0	0–0	2–0	0–2	2–1	0–3
Bari	0–2	2–1		0–1	1–0	2–0	0–0	5–1	0–0	1–1	2–1	2–3	3–1	2–0	0–0	0–0
Bologna	1–0	2–1	4–1		0–0	2–2	0–0	0–2	3–2	5–1	3–0	2–2	3–2	2–0	2–0	0–0
Fiorentina	0–3	4–0	1–1	2–1		1–2	1–1	1–1	3–1	1–2	0–0	0–1	1–3	1–4	1–2	2–2
Genova 1893	1–1	0–0	4–1	1–3	1–0		1–2	2–1	0–2	4–1	3–0	0–1	2–1	1–1	2–1	2–2
Juventus	2–1	5–0	3–1	0–0	5–2	1–2		1–1	0–1	2–0	1–0	2–0	2–1	0–0	3–0	2–0
Lazio	1–3	4–0	3–1	2–0	5–0	2–1	1–1		3–0	3–0	3–0	1–1	0–0	1–1	6–0	2–1
Liguria	3–1	2–1	5–0	0–0	1–1	0–1	1–3	2–1		1–1	2–1	1–1	0–0	1–1	0–3	1–2
Livorno	0–0	1–1	1–0	3–2	1–1	0–1	0–1	1–0	2–3		2–1	1–2	1–0	0–2	1–1	0–1
Lucchese	3–3	3–2	2–1	3–3	2–1	0–4	0–0	0–0	0–0	1–1		1–1	2–2	2–0	2–2	1–0
Milan	1–0	3–0	5–1	0–1	3–1	2–2	1–1	2–2	2–1	1–0	4–0		3–1	1–0	0–1	0–0
Napoli	1–1	1–0	1–0	1–1	3–0	2–2	1–1	1–0	3–2	1–1	2–1	1–1		2–2	1–1	3–0
Roma	1–1	2–1	3–2	0–1	4–0	1–3	2–1	2–1	1–0	1–0	5–0	3–1	2–1		2–1	1–1
Torino	1–1	2–1	2–4	3–1	2–0	0–1	1–1	1–0	3–0	4–1	3–2	0–0	0–0	3–1		1–0
Triestina	1–1	0–0	6–0	3–1	2–1	2–1	2–0	0–0	1–0	0–2	0–0	0–0	3–0	0–0	1–0	

Source: Almanacco Illustrato del Calcio - La Storia 1898-2004, Panini Edizioni, Modena, September 2005 (in Italian)
Legend: Blue = home team win; Yellow = draw; Red = away team win.

== Top goalscorers ==
Rank	Player	Club	Goals
1	(Italy) Giuseppe Meazza	Ambrosiana-Inter	20
2	(Italy) Guglielmo Trevisan	Triestina	18
3	(Italy) Danilo Michelini	Roma	16
3	(Italy) Aldo Boffi	Milan	16
5	(Italy) Carlo Reguzzoni	Bologna	15
5	(Italy) Silvio Piola	Lazio	15
7	(Italy) Pietro Ferraris	Ambrosiana-Inter	14
8	(Italy) Umberto Busani	Lazio	12
9	(Italy) Bruno Maini	Bologna	11
9	(Italy) Luciano Peretti	Liguria	11
11	(Italy) Ermes Borsetti	Roma	10
12	(Italy) Pietro Arcari	Genova 1893	9
12	(Italy) Giovanni Ferrari	Ambrosiana-Inter	9
12	(Italy) Angelo Bollano	Liguria	9

== References and sources ==
- Almanacco Illustrato del Calcio - La Storia 1898-2004, Panini Edizioni, Modena, September 2005
