= Calegari =

Calegari is an Italian surname. Notable people with the surname include:

- Antonio Calegari (1757–1828), Italian oratorio composer
- Danny Calegari, mathematician
- Francesco Antonio Calegari (1656–1742), Italian priest and composer
- Frank Calegari, mathematician
- Lucas Calegari (born 2002), Brazilian footballer
- Luigi Antonio Calegari (1780–1849), Italian opera composer
- Maria Calegari (born 1957), American ballet dancer
- Maria Cattarina Calegari (1644–after 1675), Italian composer
- Nínive Clements Calegari, American teacher
- Renzo Calegari (1933–2017), Italian comics artist
- Santo Calegari (1662–1717), Italian sculptor
- Stefania Calegari (born 1967), Italian ice dancer

== See also ==
- Callegari
