= Callegari =

Callegari is an Italian surname. Notable people with the surname include:

- Beatrice Callegari (born 1991), Italian synchronized swimmer
- Bill Callegari (born 1941), American businessman and civil engineer
- Claude Callegari (1962–2021), English YouTuber
- Giacomo Callegari (born 1971), Italian footballer
- Gian Paolo Callegari (1909–1982), Italian screenwriter and director
- Gino Ferrer Callegari (1911–1954), Italian footballer and manager
- Giuseppe Callegari (1841–1906), Italian cardinal
- Lorenzo Callegari (born 1998), French footballer
- Stefano Callegari (chef) (born 1968), Italian chef
- Stefano Callegari (footballer) (born 1997), Aregntine footballer

== See also ==
- Calegari
