= Ark of Saints Faustinus and Jovita =

Baroque tomb in Brescia, Italy, housing relics of Saints Faustino and Giovita

Arca sepolcrale dei Santi Faustino e Giovita
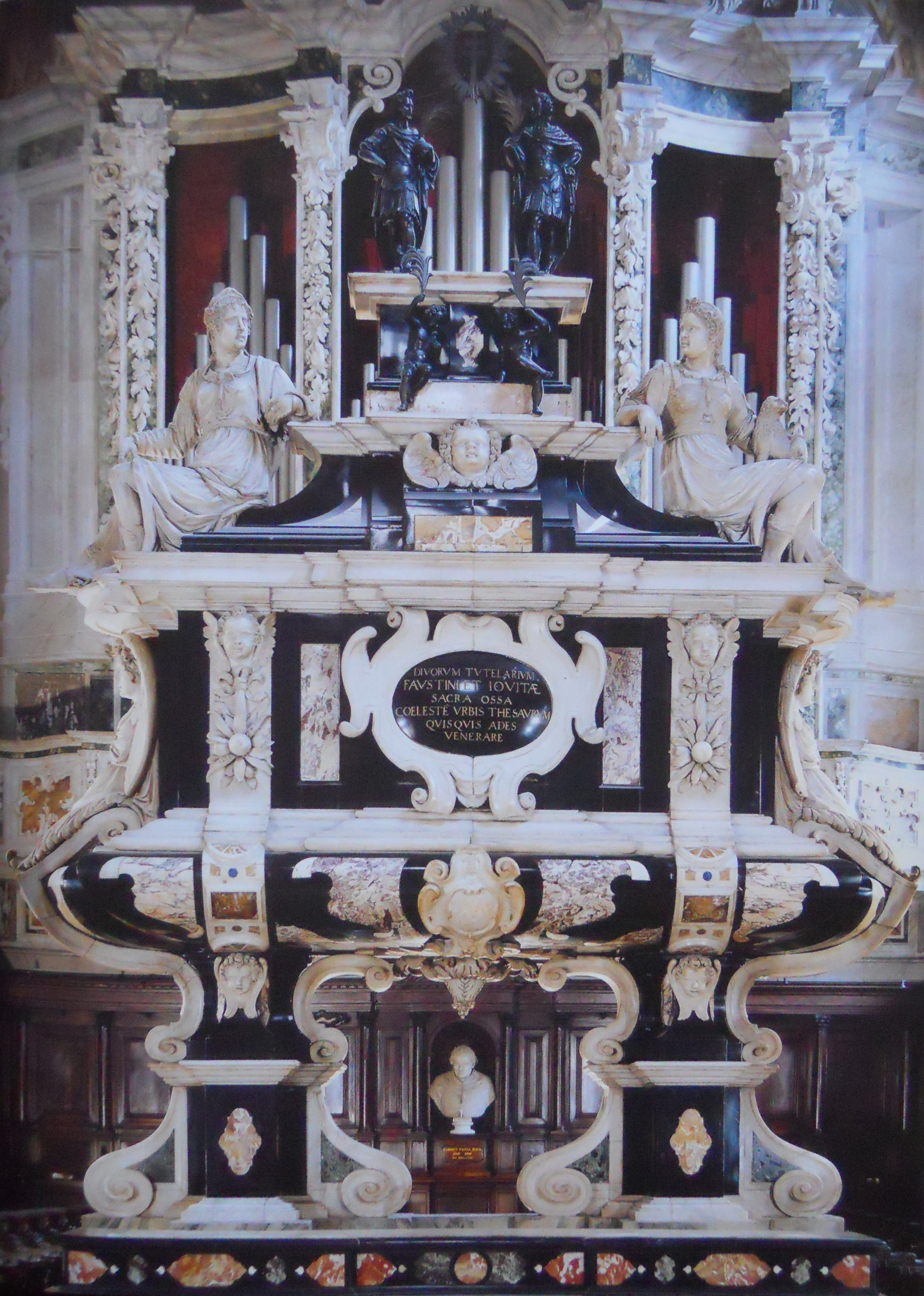
- Artist: Giovanni Antonio Carra
- Year: 1617–1622
- Type: Sculpture
- Medium: Carrara marble with inlays of black and polychrome marbles, plus numerous details in gold and bronze
- Location: Church of Saints Faustino and Giovita; Brescia

The Tomb of Saints Faustino and Giovita is an artwork housed in the Church of Saints Faustino and Giovita in Brescia, located at the center of the presbytery, as part of the high altar. The tomb contains the remains of Saints Faustinus and Jovita, the titular saints of the church and patron saints of the city, whose sepulcher was rediscovered in 1455 in the old crypt, no longer extant, where it had been placed by Bishop Ramperto in the 9th century. The current tomb is the work of the sculptor Giovanni Antonio Carra, who created it between 1617 and 1622 as part of extensive reconstruction work on the church carried out in the first half of the 17th century. The decorative style of the sepulcher is fully Baroque, and its high artistic and compositional quality makes it an exceptionally valuable piece of art. Given its function as the repository of the relics of Brescia's two patron saints, the work also holds significant religious importance.

== History ==
=== Sepulcher of Ramperto ===
The remains of the city's patron saints, already placed in a marble sepulcher by Bishop Ramperto in the 9th century, were rediscovered in the crypt of the church during major restoration work in 1455. Under Abbot Bernardo Marcello, the "magistro" Tonino from Lumezzane was immediately commissioned to provide a suitable setting. The Ramperto tomb was thus placed at the center of the crypt, replacing the high altar, on six marble columns. The arrangement remained largely unchanged until 1601, when, likely for practical reasons, the crypt was demolished to lower the level of the presbytery, which until then was very high as the crypt was only slightly below ground. According to the diaries of Scipione Covo and the chronicles of Bernardino Faino, upon completion of the floor-lowering work above the crypt on April 2 of the same year, the tomb was simply reassembled adjacent to the high altar of the new choir.

=== New tomb ===
The diaries of the Bianchi record the start of construction of a new tomb in 1617, described as "most beautiful and majestic," although the notarial act officially commissioning Giovanni Antonio Carra was recorded only on February 20, 1618, referencing, however, a "design already approved." Subsequent minutes from the meetings of the Public Deputies for Construction record the progress of the work with a wealth of information and a detailed list of the components to be created. On June 30 of the same year, the city council issued Carra a "safe-conduct" to facilitate the transport of marble blocks from Massa Carrara via Genoa. In 1620, the old tomb was reopened to inspect its contents, "until the new tomb, which is being built, is completed." The work proceeded smoothly and without delays: on April 29, 1621, Giovanni Antonio Carra received payment for the two allegorical figures placed on the tomb's lid, while the compensation for the other parts was already being determined. The work was likely completed by February 1, 1622, when the final payment was made, accompanied by praise from the public deputies. In early 1623, a new, more thorough inspection of the tomb's interior was conducted in preparation for the translation, which took place shortly afterward during a solemn ceremony.

In 1626, documents mention the tomb again, with plans to further embellish it. The commission was again entrusted to Giovanni Antonio Carra, who committed to creating "four large statues, four braccia high, consistent with the models already made in full size, to support the canopy [...] and four others in the form of angels to support the altar, all in white Botticino stone, in excellent and commendable form, and fully consistent with the models." Everything was executed as planned, except for the four angels supporting the altar, which were instead made in bronze. However, despite the extensive archival documentation, the current configuration of the tomb does not fully align with the documented descriptions: additional work must have been carried out on the tomb's decorations.

=== Fire of 1743 and repairs ===
In 1743, on the night of December 2, a fire broke out in the church, destroying the entire choir, the presbytery, the wooden stalls, the organ, the baldachin above the tomb, and all the frescoes in that area of the church. Contemporary accounts suggest that the tomb itself sustained minimal damage, likely limited to the detachment of some marble veneer slabs on the rear, "on the side facing the choir, where the heat was greatest, causing the bitumen holding them in place to melt." Subsequent restoration work evidently altered parts of the tomb's original configuration: in 1744, the following year, the sculptor Antonio Calegari was paid for work done "concerning the statues of the tomb," while the next year, his son, Santo Calegari the Younger, was paid for similar work. A few months later, an unidentified Antonio Marini was paid for supplying "quick-setting plaster" to restore the tomb, and a gilder, Giuseppe Telarolo, was paid for regilding the inscriptions.

== Description ==
=== Tomb ===
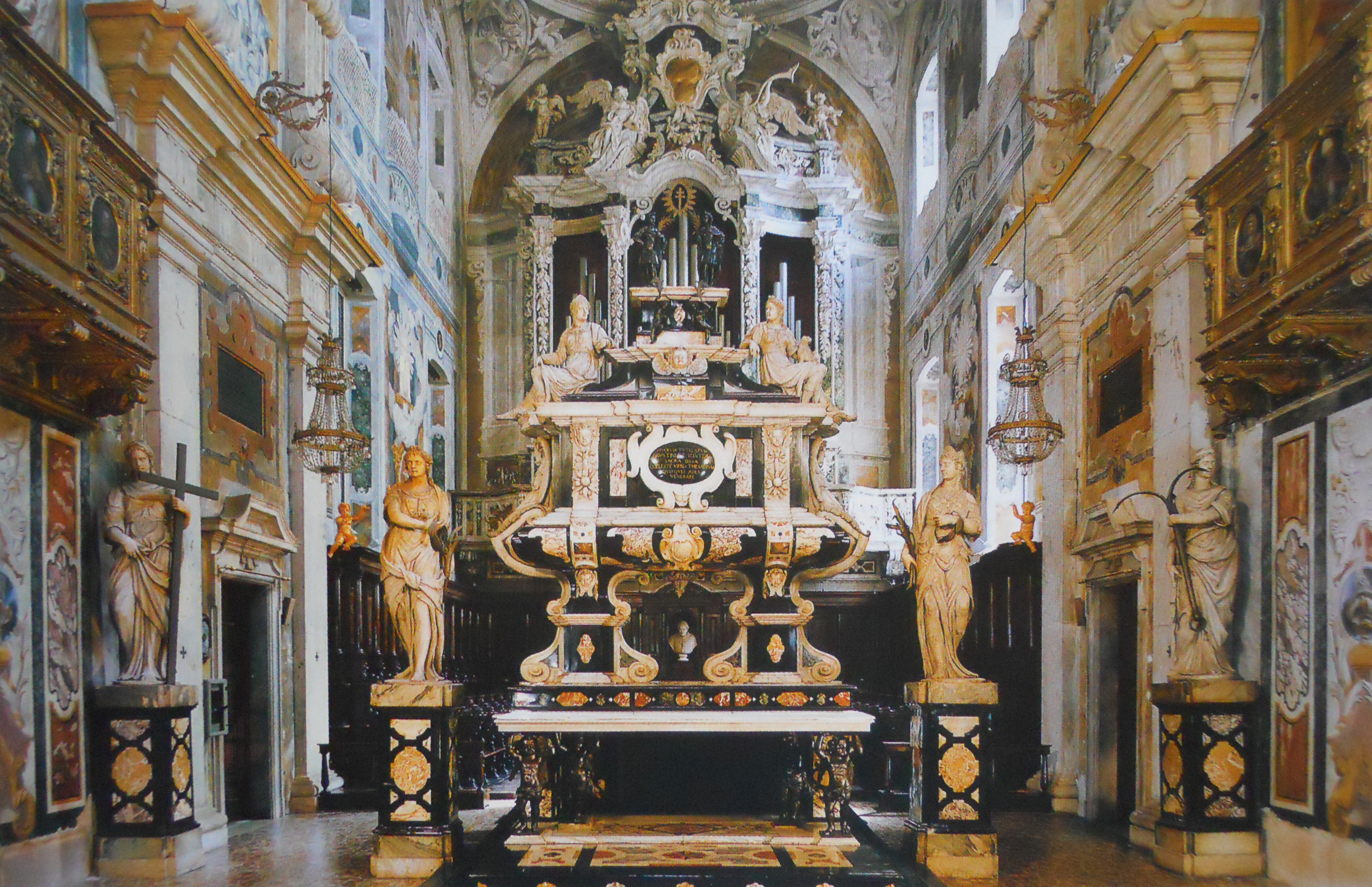
View of the presbytery with the tomb at the center. The altar is visible at its base, flanked by the four allegorical statues

The large tomb, primarily made of Carrara marble variously inlaid with black marble and other multicolored stones, rises above the altar table, to which it is connected, supported by two sturdy dark bases that expand laterally into volutes and white marble friezes. Quoting Antonio Morassi: "It is of a swollen, fully Baroque form, harmonious in proportions and design." At its very top, it bears bronze figures of the patron saints surmounted by a double-cross, modeled after the relic of the Holy Cross preserved in the Treasure of the Holy Crosses of the Old Cathedral. The two statuettes rest on a marble base supported by two small seated bronze angels. All four figures also carry the palm of martyrdom. On the lid sit two allegorical female figures in Carrara marble, not identified by specific attributes but, according to documents, likely representing Fortitude and Faith. Giovanni Vezzoli suggests instead that they may symbolize Brescia and Venice, as the figure on the right is clad in armor and holds a small lion on her knees, a symbolism fitting for Brescia. The opposite statue, however, lacks attributes to identify it with Venice.

=== The Lateral Statues ===
Flanking the tomb are the four statues originally designed to support the baldachin that crowned the composition, destroyed in the 1743 fire. The outermost two represent Faith on the left and Hope on the right, the former holding a large cross and the latter an anchor, identifying elements of the two theological virtues. The allegorical meaning of the two inner statues, which bear only a laurel crown and a palm leaf, is more problematic. Over the centuries, critics have generally referred to them as Saints, while Vezzoli suggests they may be Victories, due to the palms and crowns they hold, an iconography more suited to exalting the glory of martyrdom.

== Details/images ==
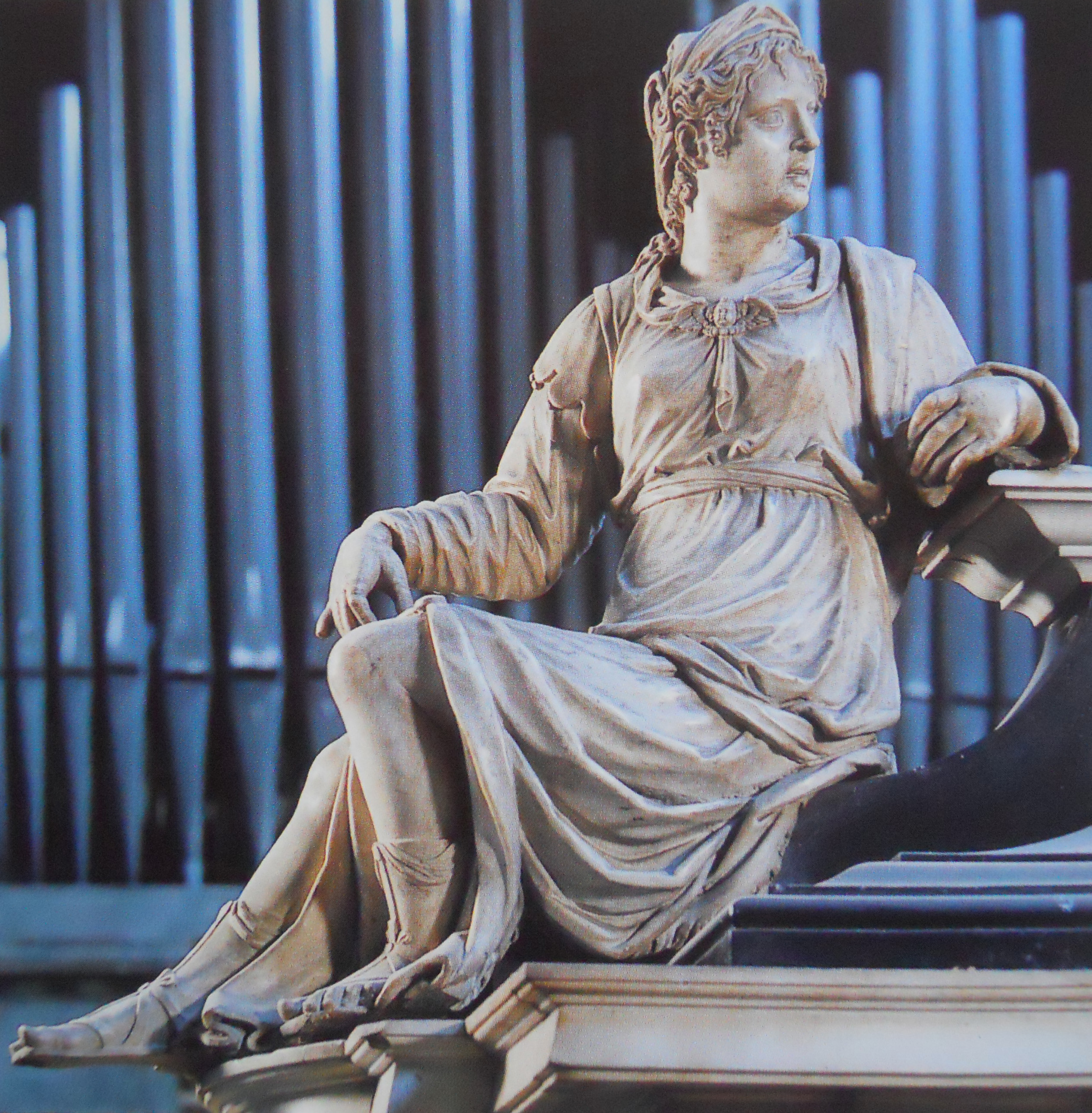
Allegorical figure of Venice or Faith on the lid

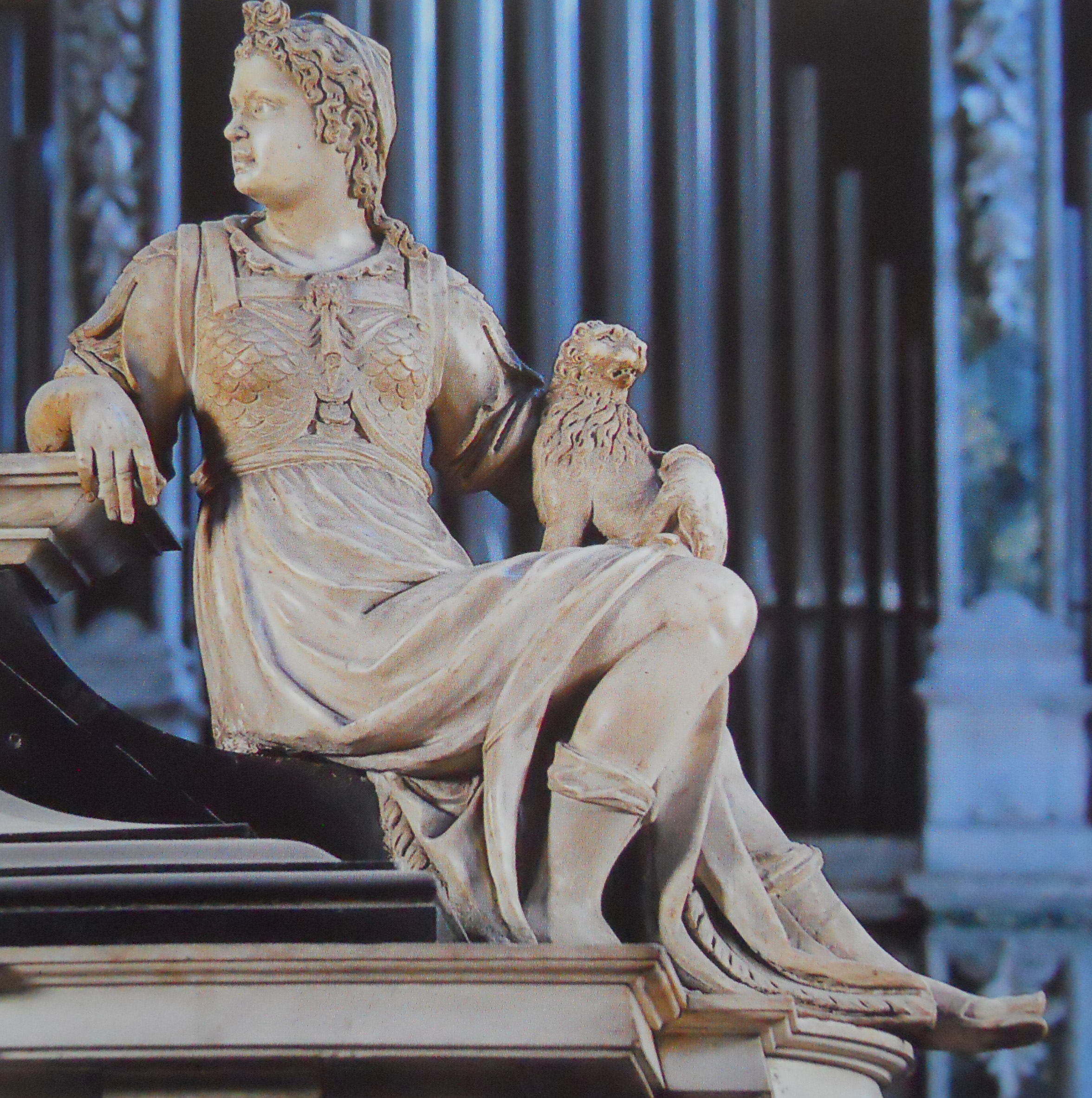
Allegorical figure of Brescia or Fortitude on the lid

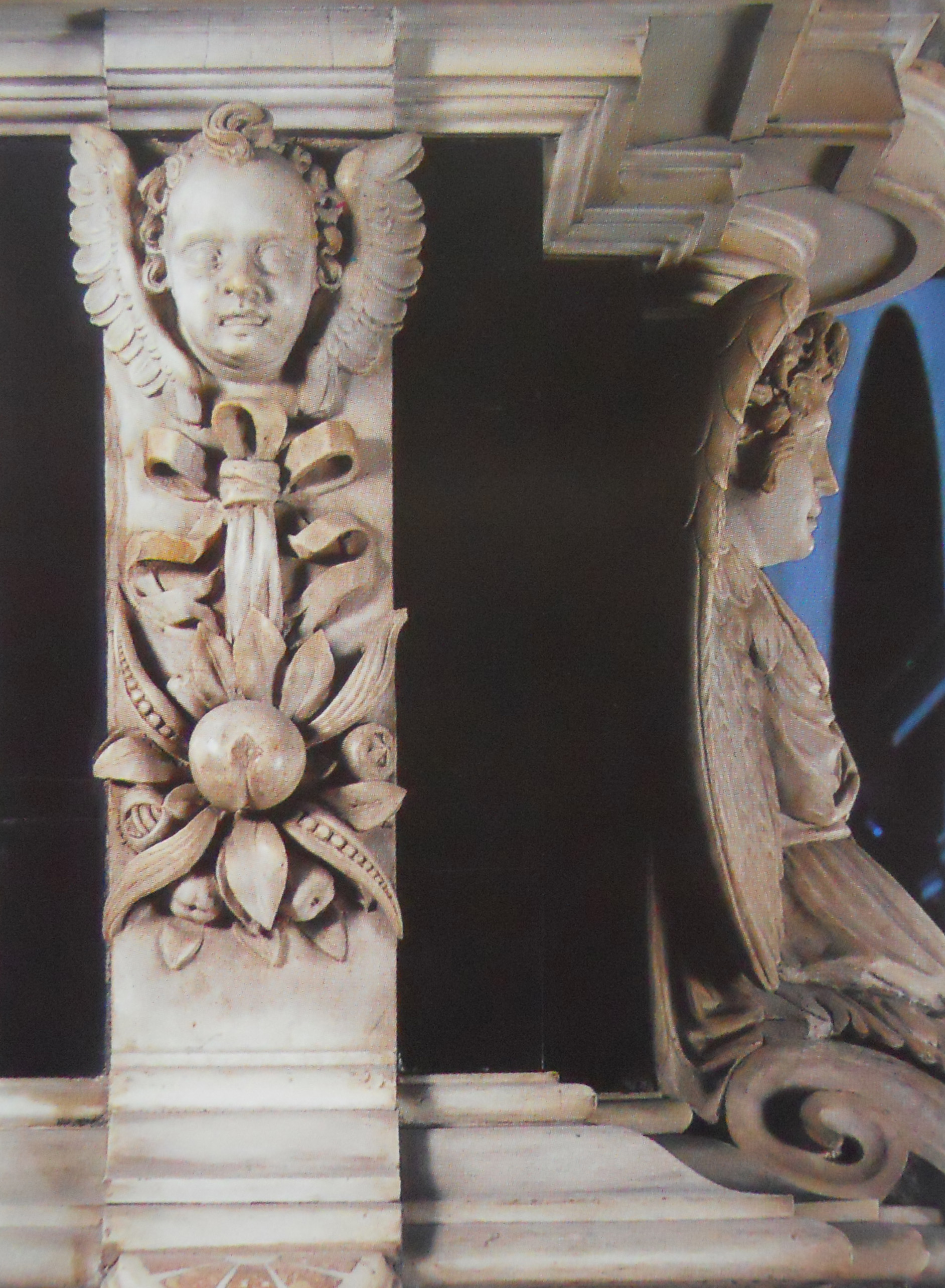
Decoration of a pilaster on the front of the tomb

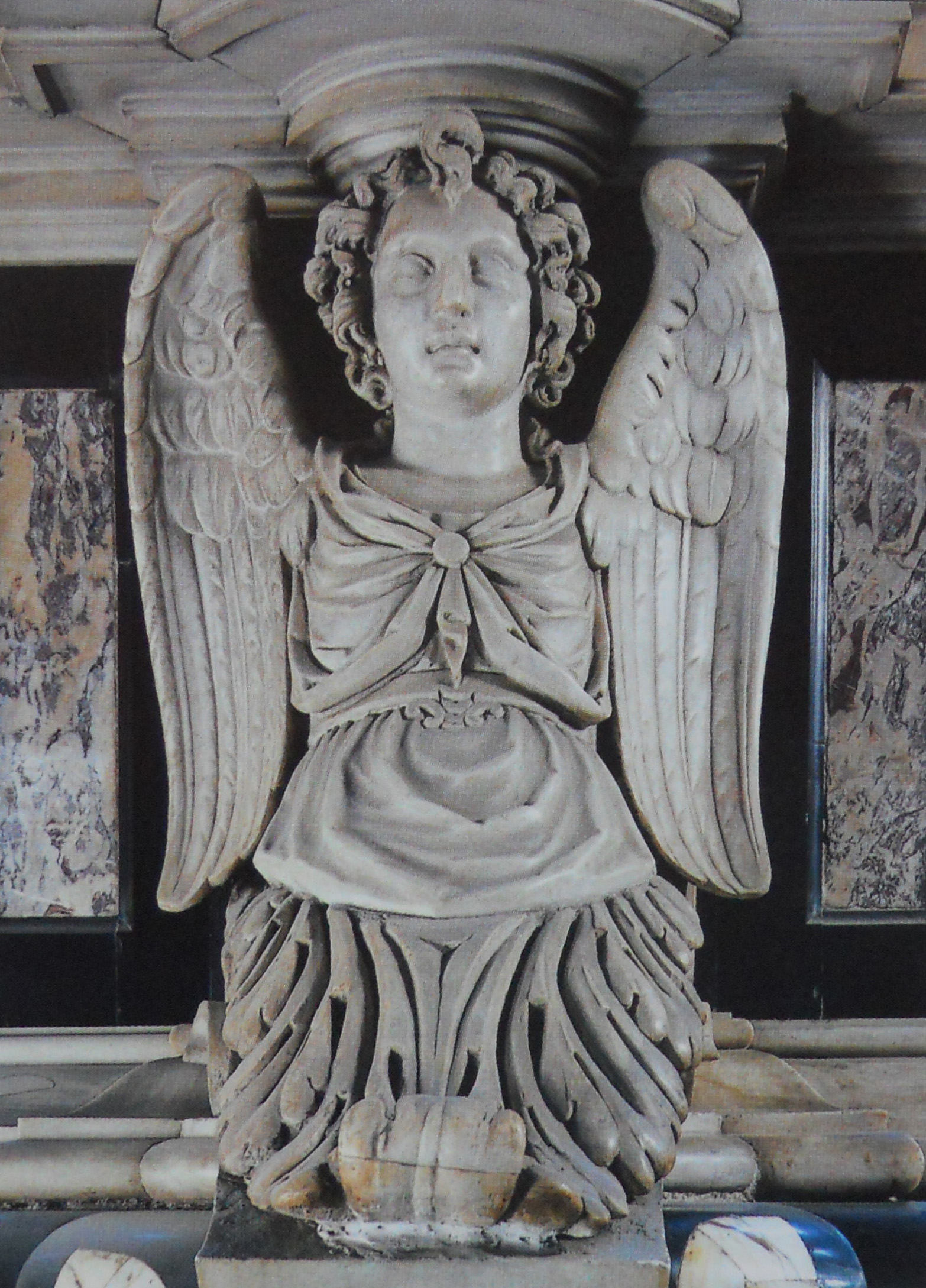
Caryatid with an angel bust on the side of the tomb

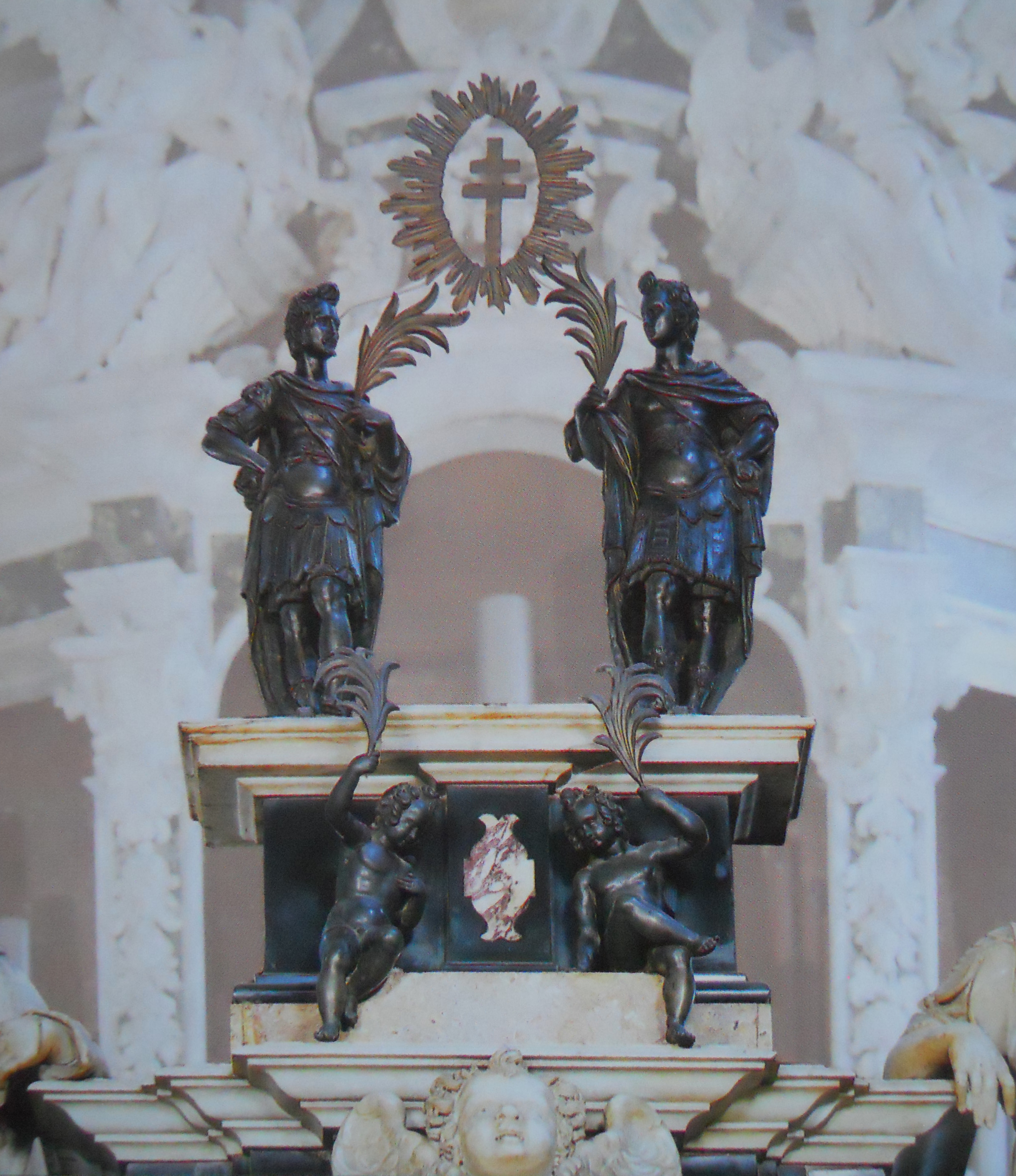
Saints Faustino and Giovita and two angels with the palms of martyrdom and the Holy Cross, bronze sculptures at the top of the tomb

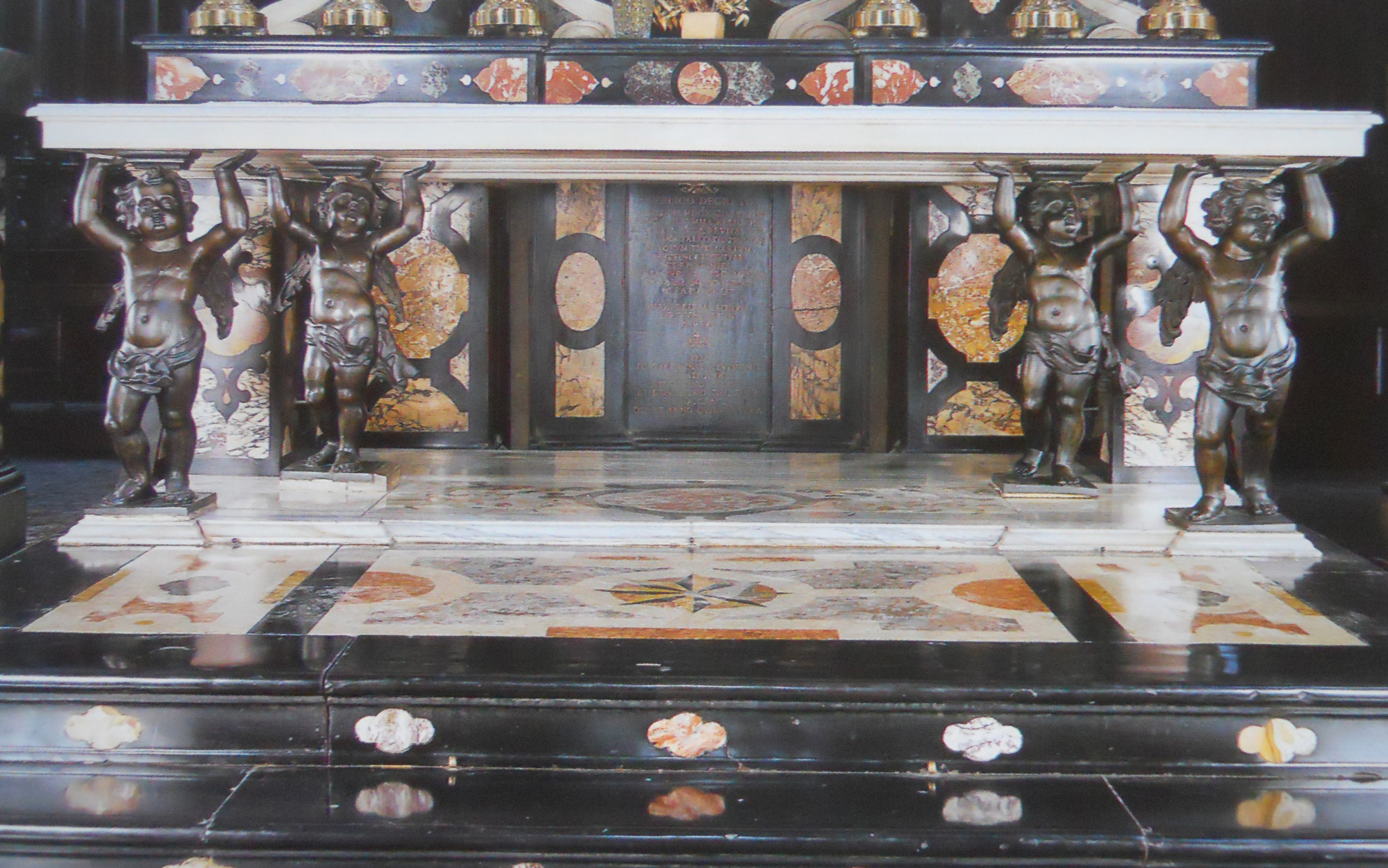
The altar in front of the tomb with the bronze angels

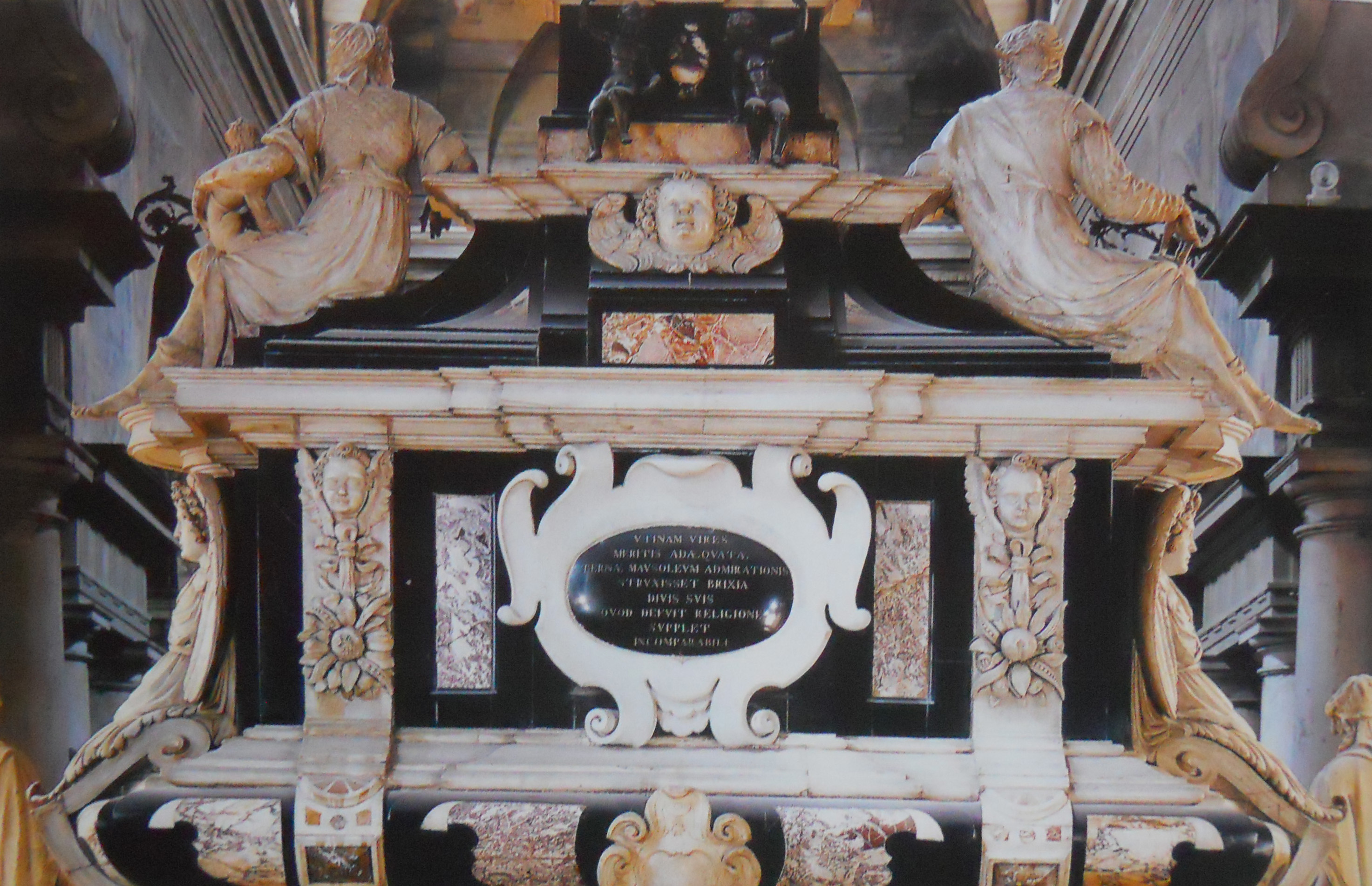
The back of the tomb

== Bibliography ==
- Bianchi (1630). Diari [Diaries] (in Italian). Brescia.
- Covo, Scipione (1610). Memorie diverse della Città di Brescia, e i suoi Fondatori; de' Santi Martiri che sono in S. Affra, de' Vescovi Santi e non Santi: et altre. Raccolte da Scipione Covo Cittadino Bresciano [Various Memories of the City of Brescia, and its Founders; of the Holy Martyrs in S. Affra, of the Holy and Non-Holy Bishops: and Others. Collected by Scipione Covo, Brescian Citizen] (in Italian). Brescia.
- Faino, Bernardino (1630). Catalogo Delle Chiese riuerite in Brescia, et delle Pitture et Scolture memorabili, che si uedono in esse in questi tempi [Catalog of the Churches Found in Brescia, and of the Memorable Paintings and Sculptures Seen in Them in These Times] (in Italian). Brescia.
- Ganassoni, Andrea (1743). Relazione per il Comune di Brescia sull'incendio della chiesa dei Santi Faustino e Giovita [Report for the Municipality of Brescia on the Fire in the Church of Saints Faustino and Giovita] (in Italian).
- Morassi, Antonio (1939). Catalogo delle cose d'arte e di antichità d'Italia - Brescia [Catalog of Art and Antiquities of Italy - Brescia] (in Italian).
- Begni Redona, Pier Virgilio (1999). AA.VV. (ed.). Pitture e sculture in San Faustino [Paintings and Sculptures in San Faustino] (in Italian). Brescia: Editrice La Scuola.
- Rossi, Ottavio (1624). Historia de' Gloriosissimi Santi Martiri Faustino et Giovita [History of the Most Glorious Holy Martyrs Faustino and Giovita] (in Italian). Brescia.
- Rossi, Ottavio (1623). Relatione dell'Aprimento dell'Arca de' Santissimi Protomartiri, et Patroni della Città di Brescia, Faustino, et Giovita [Report on the Opening of the Tomb of the Most Holy Protomartyrs and Patrons of the City of Brescia, Faustino, and Giovita] (in Italian). Brescia.
- Vezzoli, Giovanni (1964). La scultura dei secoli XVII e XVIII [Sculpture of the 17th and 18th Centuries] (in Italian). Vol. IV.
