= Suber =

Suber may refer to:

== Species ==
- Quercus suber, the cork oak, a plant species
- Schistura suber, a ray-finned fish species

== People ==
- Dianne Boardley Suber, American academic administrator
- Jackson Suber (born 1999), American professional golfer
- Lorenzo Suber (born 1912), Italian professional football player
- Margareta Suber (1892–1984), Swedish writer
- Peter Suber (born 1951), philosopher
