= Buonocore =

Buonocore is an Italian surname. Notable people with the surname include:

- Alfonso Buonocore (1933–2023), Italian swimmer and water polo player
- Carmelo Buonocore (1912–1982), Italian footballer
- Fabrizio Buonocore (born 1977), Italian water polo player
- Giovanni Battista Buonocore (1643–1699), Italian Baroque painter
- Nino Buonocore (born 1958), Italian singer-songwriter
- Pasquale Buonocore (1916–2003), Italian water polo player
