= Stefano Callegari =

Stefano Callegari may refer to:

- Stefano Callegari (chef), Italian chef
- Stefano Callegari (footballer), Argentine footballer
