= Giuseppe Di Bianco =

Italian composer

- Born: Giuseppe Di Bianco; 17 October 1969 (age 57); Naples, Italy
- Education: Salerno University
- Occupations: Composer, pianist
- Website: www.giuseppedibianco.com

Giuseppe Di Bianco (born 17 October 1969) is an Italian composer, conductor, arranger, mainly of choral music.

== Biography ==
=== Education ===
Giuseppe Di Bianco holds degrees in Piano, Composition, Choral conducting and Music Didactics from the Conservatories of Salerno and San Pietro a Majella of Naples, graduating Summa cum Laude and Honorable Mention in Foreign Languages and Modern Literature. Enrico Buondonno, direct heir of the didactic tradition of Licinio Refice, Raffaele Casimiri, Achille Longo, started him to study the composition. His training also includes advanced courses and workshops at Accademia Musicale Chigiana in Siena and Scuola di Musica of Fiesole (Florence) with Giacomo Manzoni, Salvatore Sciarrino, Louis Andriessen, Peter Maxwell Davies, Luis de Pablo; analysis seminars with Jean - Jacques Nattiez, Janet Schmalfeldt (Tufts University, MA).

=== Artistic activity ===
Active as a pianist, teacher, and composer, with the main interest in choral composition, published by Feniarco Ed. (IT), Federcoritrentino e «Композитор • Санкт-Петербург» Publishing House and performed in Italy, the Vatican City, Europe, Russia, Japan, the Philippines, he has received numerous awards in composition competitions, obtaining the first prize in the International Composition Competition "Cesare Augusto Seghizzi" of Gorizia His choral works have been commissioned and performed by international ensembles, including "The University of the Philippines Singing Ambassadors", Zürcher Sing-Akademie (CH), Vocaal Ensemble MUSA (NL), Coro Giovanile Italiano, Coro da Camera di Torino, Academic Mixed Choir "Vasilyev" (Russia), Coro di Voci Bianche of Santa Cecilia Academy, Rome, "Academic choir of Aarhus" (DK), "E STuudio Noortenkor" (EST), "San Josè State University Choraliers" (San Josè, CA, USA).

His choral music has been performed and included as part of the main international music festivals: National and International Choral Competition "Guido d'Arezzo”, International Choral Competition “Cesare Augusto Seghizzi" of Gorizia, Vittorio Veneto National Choral Competition, International Choral Competition "J. Gallus" of Maribor (Slovenia), International "Cracovia Cantans" Festival (PO), "Rainbow Petersburg Choir Festival", St. Petersburg (RU), Festival MITO SettembreMusica(IT), Salerno Festival, Fondazione Pietà dei Turchini|Fondazione "Pietà dei Turchini" of Naples; URTIcanti Contemporary Music Festival, Bari; International Milan Expo 2016, International Festival della Liuteria of Cremona, Rassegna concertistica di Villa Rufolo, Ravello. In 2021, his piece "Aetherium (Itinerarium Dantis in Deum)", was officially presented as part of the "Leading Voices" international symposium in Utrecht, organized by Europa Cantat.

He was invited as guest composer at the University of North Carolina (Chapel Hill Campus, NC, USA) and at "Fine Arts and Music University" of Aichi, Japan.

In 2014 he was selected among the composers included in the "Invisible Cities Project", an international compositional project inspired by the novel of the same name by Italo Calvino and aimed at transposing the text "Invisible Cities" into music, commissioned to a group of composers, including Carlo Domeniconi, Victor Koulaphides, Alexey Larin, Joe Schittino.

He was officially invited to join the "FENIARCO" Italian projects "Officina Corale del Futuro", La Musica di Dante, i cori giovanili italiani alla corte del sommo Poeta (2021); D'Annunzio, maestro e musico (ARCA, 2023). In 2025 his composition "Aetherium" (Itinerarium Dantis in Deum) was chosen to represent Italy at the "World EXPO 2025" in Osaka (Japan) in "Designing Voices for Our Lives" project for World Expo Osaka 2025, led by the Mozarteum University Salzburg and supported by the Association Européenne des Conservatoires (AEC)

Some of his compositions have been recorded by "Coro da Camera di Torino" (CDs "Made in Italy", 2015; "Passio Domini Jesu Christi", 2018), and included in the online PROJECT : ENCORE™ of Schola Cantorum on Hudson.

He is a member of the FENIARCO National Artistic Commission; Artistic Director of "Franco Di Franco" Musical Competition and "Wilhelm Kempff" piano Award of Positano.

=== Musical style and influences ===
Giuseppe Di Bianco’s compositional language is rooted in a close relationship with vocality, textual expression, and the spiritual dimension of choral sound. His works often develop through carefully controlled formal processes in which the semantic and phonetic qualities of the text shape musical structure, phrasing, and timbral design. Combining contemporary choral textures with modal writing and Mediterranean melodic inflections, Di Bianco’s music balances constructive rigor with expressive immediacy, avoiding overt experimentalism in favor of communicative intensity and cantabile lyricism. His aesthetic reflects an interest in the choral tradition as both a sonic and spiritual experience, where sound becomes a vehicle for reflection, inner listening, and collective expression.

=== Awards and special honours ===
==== Awards (selection) ====
2019 – International Award CostieraArte 2019, for musical activities, City of Maiori, Amalfi Coast (Italy)

2016 – Winner, 13th International Trophy of Choral Composition “Cesare Augusto Seghizzi” (Gorizia, Italy)

2014 – First prize, VIII International Contemporalia Choral Composition Competition (Badajoz, Spain)

2012 – First prize, V International Choir Laboratory – XXI Century Composition Competition (Saint Petersburg, Russia)

2010 – First prize, X A.C.P. National Choral Composition Competition, Regione Piemonte (Italy)

2008 – First prize, International Choral Award “José Ribeiro de Sousa” (Alqueidão da Serra, Portugal)

2008 – First prize, IX A.C.P. National Choral Composition Competition, Regione Piemonte (Italy)

2007 – First prize, Soldanella Choral Composition Competition (Brentonico, Trento, Italy)

2001 – First prize, XI International Choral Composition Award by Federcori Trentino (Trento, Italy)

=== Selected works ===
- Credo - SATB (2021)
- L'onda- SSATB (2023)
- Aetherium (Itinerarium Dantis in Deum) - SATB divisi, a cappella (2021)
- Plaudite manibus - SATTB (2018)
- Lumen - SATB a cappella (2017)
- The Fairy Lullaby - 2 soli, SSA, Fl, piano (2016)
- In pace - SSATB a cappella (2014)
- Angele Dei - SATB a cappella (2010)
- Silentium (Volatizzazione di Dosso Casina) - TTBB a cappella (2007)
- In laude - SATB divisi, a cappella (2004)

== Essays ==
- Introduzione all'analisi stilistica e retorica, Convegno di Studi a cura della Fondazione "F. Menna", Salerno, 1998
- Linguaggi, inventio, percorsi critici tra tradizione e contemporaneità, in Atti del XXXVI Convegno Europeo di Studi "Seghizzi", sez. musicologia, Ed. Ufficio stampa Seghizzi, Gorizia, 2005
- InCanti di Sirene: topografia musicale di un mito, dal Mediterraneo ai Mari del Nord, 2012

== Bibliography ==
- Atti del XXXVI Convegno Europeo di Studi "Seghizzi", sez. musicologia,(pp. 195–217) Ed. Ufficio stampa Seghizzi, Gorizia, 2005
- Autori vari, Melos 3, nuove composizioni corali, Edizioni Musicali Feniarco, 2012
- E. Galvani e A. Ruo Rui(a cura di):Voci & Tradizione Piemonte, Canti della tradizione orale armonizzati o elaborati per coro, Ed. Feniarco, San Vito al Tagliamento; ACP, Piemonte, 2012
- I. Vyaeslavovna Roganova (a cura di):Хоровая лаборатория. XXI век. Музыка для детей и юношества. Выпуск 4, Ed. "Композитор • Санкт-Петербург", S. Pietroburgo, RUS, 2014
- AA.VV., D'Annunzio, Maestro e musico. Nuove composizioni ed elaborazioni su versi di Gabriele D'Annunzio, ARCA Edizioni Musicali, 2023
