= Antonio Calegari =

Italian composer

Antonio Calegari (17 February 1757, in Padua – 22 or 28 July 1828) was an Italian classical composer. His oratorio La risurrezione di Lazzaro 1779, was recorded under Filippo Maria Bressan in 2000.

He is to be distinguished from three other composers called Calegari from Padua; Father Francesco Antonio Calegari (d.1742), and Giuseppe Calegari, composer of a Betulia liberata (1771). and his own nephew Luigi Antonio Calegari.

Another contemporary of the same name, Antonio Calegari, was born in Brescia in 1699 and died on July 15, 1777.
