= Valentino Sala =

Italian footballer and coach

Personal information
- Date of birth: October 8, 1908
- Place of birth: Morimondo, Kingdom of Italy
- Date of death: December 27, 2002 (aged 94)
- Place of death: Marcignago, Italy
- Height: 1.72 m (5 ft 7 1/2 in)
- Position: Midfielder

Senior career*
Years	Team	Apps	(Gls)
1927–1928	Milanese		
1928–1929	Monza		
1929–1932	Vigevanese		
1932–1935	Genova 1893	75	(9)
1935–1937	Ambrosiana-Inter	41	(1)
1937–1938	Pisa	21	(2)
1938–1941	Vigevano		
1941–1945	Meda		

Managerial career
- 1951–1952: Genoa
- * Club domestic league appearances and goals

Valentino Sala (October 8, 1908 – December 27, 2002) was an Italian professional football player and coach.

His younger brother Costantino Sala played in the Serie A for Ambrosiana-Inter in the 1930s. To distinguish them, Valentino was referred to as Sala I and Costantino as Sala II.
