= Luigi Antonio Calegari =

Italian opera composer (1780–1849)

Luigi Antonio Calegari (1780–1849) was an Italian opera composer, born in Padua. He was nephew of Antonio Calegari (1757–1828) and possibly related to other composers in the Padua Calegari family; Father Francesco Antonio Calegari (1656–1742), and Giuseppe Calegari, composer of a Betulia liberata (1771). He died in Venice.

== Operas ==
- Il matrimonio scoperto ossia Le polpette (1804, Padua)
- Erminia (1805, Venice)
- La serenata (1806, Padua)
- Amor soldato (1807, Padua)
- Irene e Filandro (1808, Venice)
- La giardiniera (1808, Rome)
- Raoul di Crequi (1808, Padua)
- Il prigioniero (1810, Venice)
- Omaggio del cuore (1815, Piacenza)
- Saul (1821, Venice) - inspired by the oratorio of Vittorio Alfieri.
