= Piero Colli =

Italian footballer (1914–2010)

Personal information
- Date of birth: 1 January 1914
- Place of birth: Vigevano, Italy
- Date of death: 19 March 2010 (aged 96)
- Position: Midfielder

Senior career*
Years	Team	Apps	(Gls)
1932–1937	Vigevano	115	(53)
1937–1938	Ambrosiana-Inter	5	(0)
1938–1941	Lucchese	75	(19)
1941–1943	Bari	21	(2)
1943–1945	Meda		
1945–1947	Vigevano	61	(13)
1947–1950	Mortara		
- * Club domestic league appearances and goals

Piero Colli (born 1 January 1914 in Vigevano – died 19 March 2010) was an Italian professional football player. He made 115 appearances for Vigevano.

== Honours ==
- Serie A champion: 1937/38
