= Nicola Ferrara =

Argentine footballer

Personal information
- Full name: Nicola Guillermo Ferrara
- Date of birth: August 28, 1910
- Place of birth: Chiaromonte, Italy
- Height: 1.62 m (5 ft 4 in)
- Position: Midfielder

Senior career*
Years	Team	Apps	(Gls)
1931–1933	Platense		
1933–1936	Livorno	52	(10)
1936–1937	Napoli	11	(2)
1937–1938	Ambrosiana-Inter	18	(4)
1939	Platense		
- * Club domestic league appearances and goals

Nicola Guillermo Ferrara (born August 28, 1910, in Chiaromonte, Italy) was an Argentine professional football player. He also held Italian citizenship.

His younger brother Antonio Ferrara also played football professionally (including 3 seasons in the Serie A on the same teams as Nicola). To distinguish them, Nicola was known as Ferrara I and Antonio as Ferrara II.

== Honours ==
- Serie A champion: 1937/38
