= Antonio Ferrara (footballer) =

Argentine footballer

Personal information
- Date of birth: April 4, 1912
- Place of birth: San Fernando, Argentina
- Position: Midfielder

Senior career*
Years	Team	Apps	(Gls)
1932–1933	Estudiantes de La Plata		
1934–1935	Livorno	19	(2)
1935–1937	Napoli	33	(6)
1937–1939	Ambrosiana-Inter	10	(1)
1939–1946	Acassuso	125	(36)
- * Club domestic league appearances and goals

Antonio Ferrara (born April 4, 1912) was an Argentine professional football player. He also held Italian citizenship.

His older brother Nicola Ferrara also played football professionally (including 3 seasons in the Serie A on the same teams as Antonio). To distinguish them, Nicola was known as Ferrara I and Antonio as Ferrara II.

== Honours ==
- Serie A champion: 1937/38.
