= Egidio Capra =

Italian footballer (1914-1958)

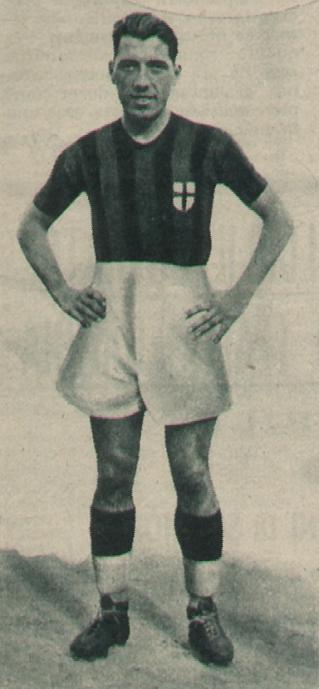

Personal information
- Date of birth: 27 May 1914
- Place of birth: Lodi, Kingdom of Italy
- Date of death: 29 March 1958 (aged 43)
- Place of death: Lodi, Italy
- Height: 1.65 m (5 ft 5 in)
- Position: Forward

Senior career*
Years	Team	Apps	(Gls)
1931–1936	Fanfulla		
1936–1939	Milan	83	(20)
1939–1941	Lucchese	63	(14)
1941–1942	Modena	20	(2)
1942–1944	Fanfulla	42	(15)
1944–1945	Pavia		
1945–1946	Cremonese	28	(6)
1946–1947	Como	41	(14)
1947–1948	Legnano	21	(6)
1948–1949	Fanfulla		

International career
1937	Italy	2	(0)
- * Club domestic league appearances and goals

Egidio Capra (Italian pronunciation: [eˈdʒiːdjo ˈkaːpra]; 27 May 1914 – 29 March 1958) was an Italian professional footballer who played as a forward.

== Club career ==
Capra played for 4 seasons (93 games, 22 goals) in the Serie A for A.C. Milan and Modena F.C.

== International career ==
Capra made his debut for the Italy national football team on 31 October 1937 in a game against Switzerland.

== Personal life ==
Capra's older brother Pietro Capra played football professionally. To distinguish them, Pietro was referred to as Capra I and Egidio as Capra II.
