= Piero Antona =

Italian footballer

Personal information
- Date of birth: 5 April 1912
- Place of birth: Vigevano, Italy
- Date of death: 5 January 1969 (aged 56)
- Height: 1.74 m (5 ft 8 1/2 in)
- Position: Midfielder

Senior career*
Years	Team	Apps	(Gls)
1929–1933	Vigevanesi		
1933–1934	Piacenza	26	(6)
1934–1935	Vigevanesi	19	(14)
1935–1939	Ambrosiana-Inter	44	(2)
1939–1940	Fiorentina	9	(0)
1940–1941	Vigevano		
1941–1945	Gallaratese		
1945–1947	Cuneo		
- * Club domestic league appearances and goals

Piero Antona (born 5 April 1912 in Vigevano; died 5 January 1969) was an Italian football player.

== Honours ==
- Serie A champion: 1937/38.
- Coppa Italia winner: 1938/39.
