= Emilio Gattoronchieri =

Italian footballer (born 1912)

Personal information
- Date of birth: February 7, 1912
- Place of birth: Milan, Italy
- Height: 1.74 m (5 ft 8 1/2 in)
- Position: Midfielder

Senior career*
Years	Team	Apps	(Gls)
1931–1934	Mottese		
1934–1936	Milan	7	(0)
1936–1938	Ambrosiana-Inter	15	(0)
1938–1940	Venezia	45	(0)
1940–1942	Liguria	38	(0)
1942–1943	Pro Patria	11	(0)
1943–1944	Tresoldi Cassano		
- * Club domestic league appearances and goals

Emilio Gattoronchieri (born February 7, 1912) was an Italian professional football player.

== Honours ==
- Serie A champion: 1937/38
