= Danilo Michelini =

Italian footballer and coach (1917–1983)

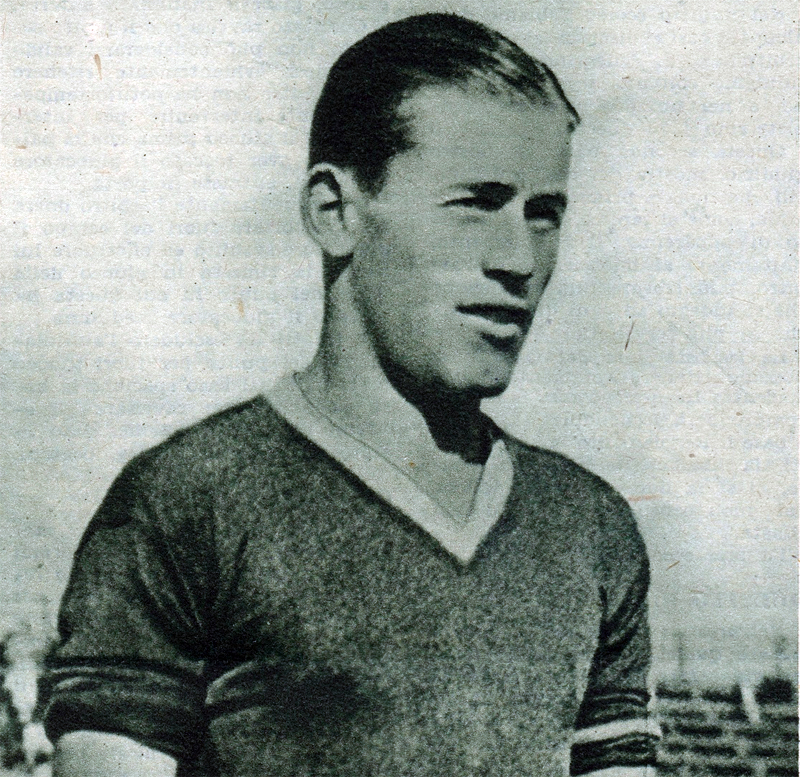

Personal information
- Date of birth: 5 March 1917
- Place of birth: Lucca, Kingdom of Italy
- Date of death: 8 December 1983 (aged 66)
- Height: 1.74 m (5 ft 8 1/2 in)
- Position: Striker

Senior career*
Years	Team	Apps	(Gls)
1934–1937	Lucchese	30	(16)
1937–1939	Roma	53	(29)
1939–1941	Torino	38	(14)
1941–1942	Livorno	29	(6)
1942–1943	Fiorentina	24	(9)
1943–1944	Genova 1893	17	(5)
1945–1949	Lucchese	103	(24)
1949–1950	Prato	24	(11)
- Brindisi

Managerial career
- Brindisi
- 1958–1959: Cascina
- * Club domestic league appearances and goals

Danilo Michelini (5 March 1917 – 8 December 1983) was an Italian professional football player and coach, who played as a forward.

Michelini was born in 1917 in Lucca. He played for 9 seasons (208 games, 77 goals) in the Serie A for A.S. Lucchese Libertas 1905, A.S. Roma, A.C. Torino, A.S. Livorno Calcio and ACF Fiorentina.

He was among the top 10 scorers of the Serie A for three seasons (1936–37: 13 goals; 1937–38: 16 goals, third best scorer; 1938–39: 13 goals, fourth best scorer).
