= Santo Calegari =

Italian sculptor

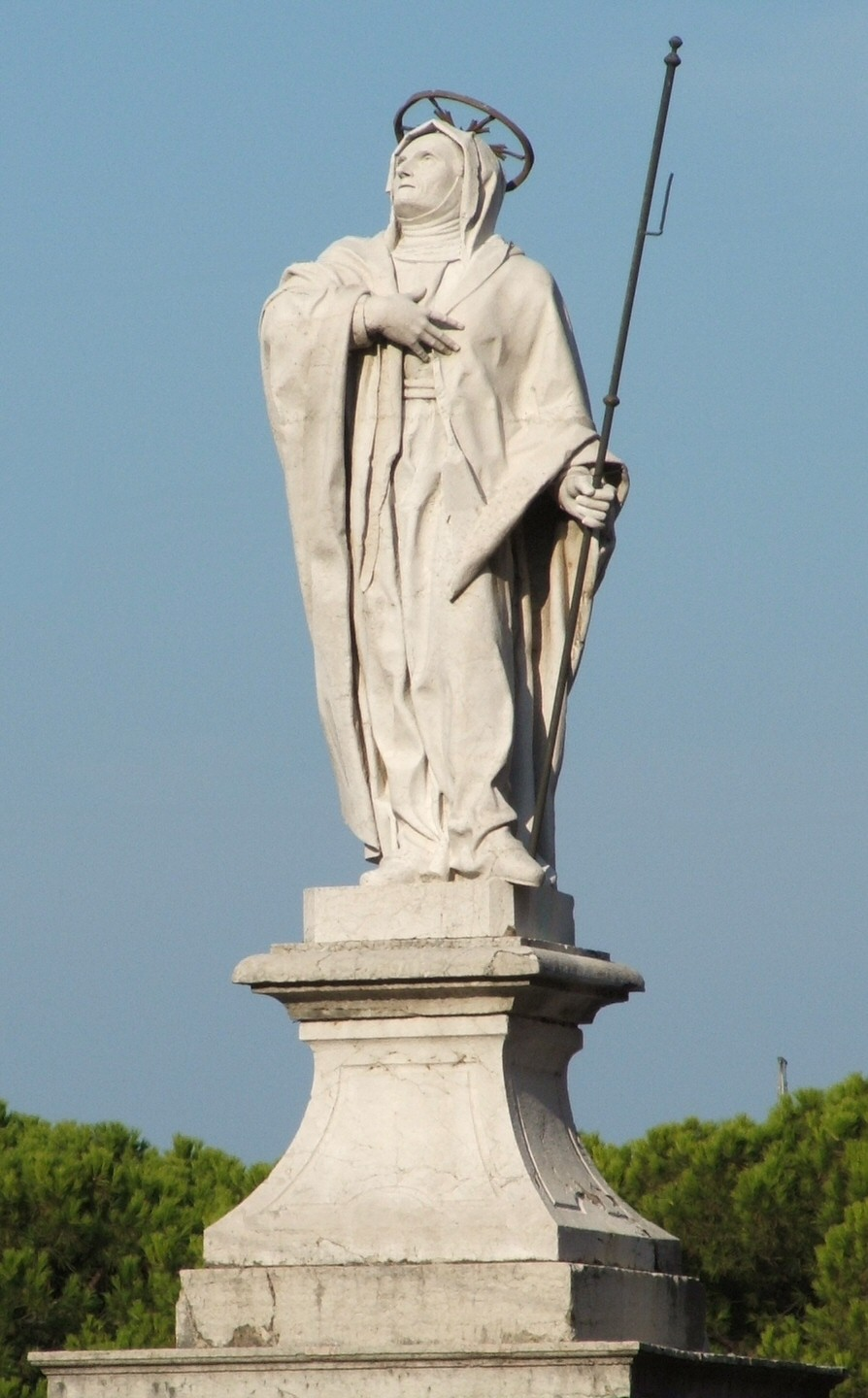
Calegari's sculpture of Saint Angela Merici

Santo Calegari (1662–1717) was an Italian sculptor of the late Baroque period who was mainly active in Brescia.

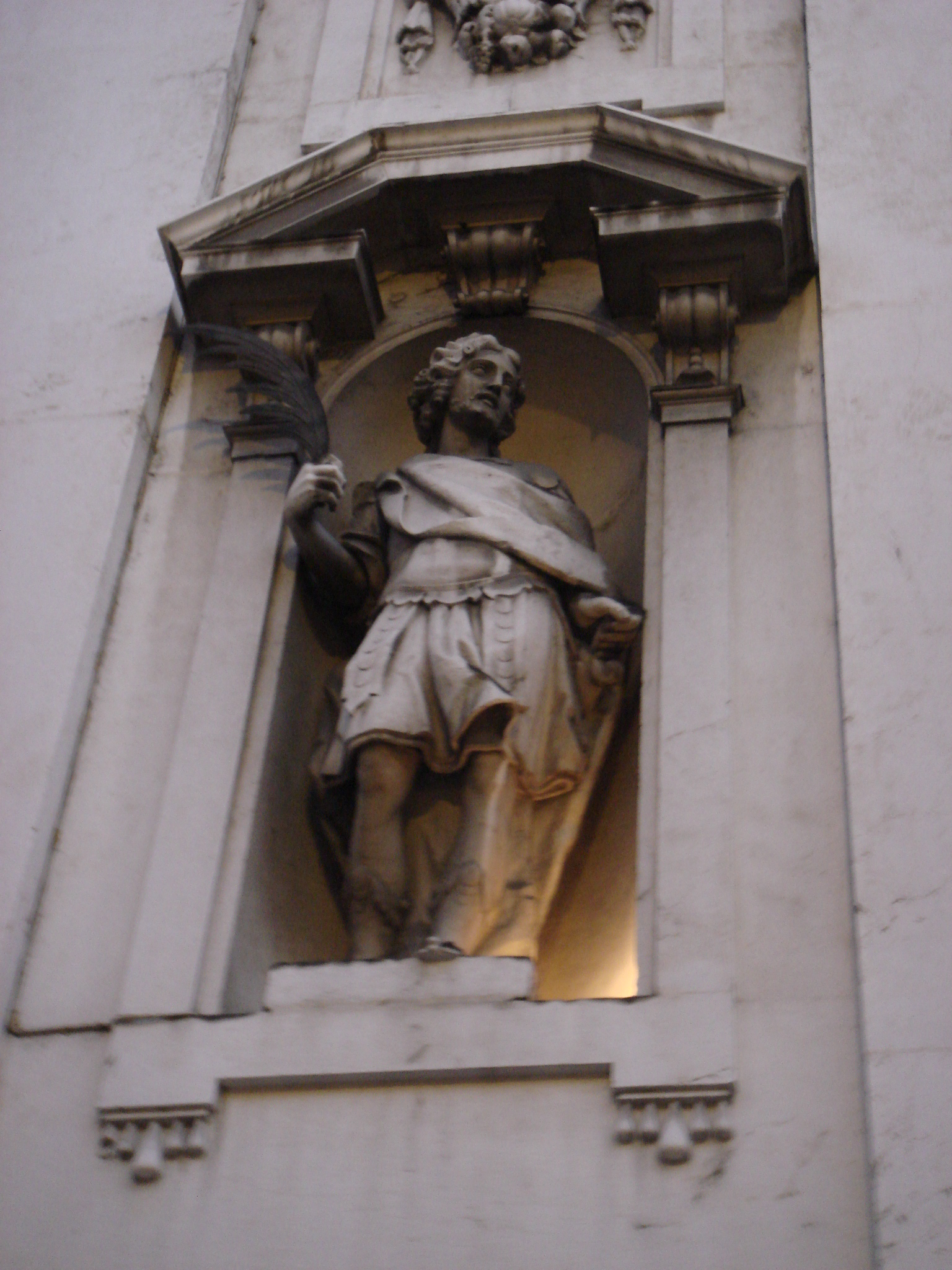
Statue of San Giovita di Sante Calegari il Vecchio

He trained with Alessandro Algardi. His son, Alessandro (1698–1777), was also a sculptor.

The statue of Angela Merici was erected in the main square of Desenzano del Garda in 1772, by Gelfino Calegari.
