= Giuseppe Ballerio =

Italian footballer

Personal information
- Date of birth: 27 June 1909
- Place of birth: Milan, Italy
- Date of death: 29 December 1999 (aged 90)
- Place of death: Milan, Italy
- Height: 1.75 m (5 ft 9 in)
- Position: Defender

Senior career*
Years	Team	Apps	(Gls)
1929–1930	Varese	19	(0)
1930–1931	Alessandria	26	(0)
1931–1932	Bari	34	(0)
1932–1940	Ambrosiana-Inter	86	(0)
1940–1941	Varese	12	(2)
1941–1942	Pro Patria	3	(0)
- * Club domestic league appearances and goals

Giuseppe Ballerio (27 June 1909 – 29 December 1999) was an Italian football player. He was born and died in Milan.

== Honours ==
- Serie A champion: 1937/38, 1939/40
- Coppa Italia winner: 1938/39
