= Alessandro Duè =

Italian footballer (born 1913)

Personal information
- Date of birth: July 10, 1913
- Place of birth: Pisa, Italy
- Height: 1.70 m (5 ft 7 in)
- Position: Midfielder

Senior career*
Years	Team	Apps	(Gls)
1930–1936	Pisa	129	(64)
1936–1937	Juventus	8	(0)
1937–1940	Bari	70	(7)
1940–1941	Trani		
- * Club domestic league appearances and goals

Alessandro Duè (born July 10, 1913) was an Italian professional football player.
