= Antonio Bisigato =

Italian footballer (1911-1965)

Personal information
- Date of birth: July 27, 1911
- Place of birth: Treviso, Italy
- Date of death: March 16, 1965 (aged 53)
- Place of death: Treviso, Italy
- Height: 1.74 m (5 ft 8 1/2 in)
- Position: Striker

Senior career*
Years	Team	Apps	(Gls)
1927–1931	Treviso	85	(41)
1931–1932	Bari	32	(16)
1932–1936	Lazio	72	(17)
1936–1938	Ambrosiana-Inter	23	(3)
1938–1940	Venezia	12	(0)
1940–1943	Treviso	43	(16)

Managerial career
- 1942–1946: Treviso
- 1949–1951: Treviso
- * Club domestic league appearances and goals

Antonio Bisigato (July 27, 1911 – March 16, 1965) was an Italian professional football player and coach.

== Honours ==
- Serie A champion: 1937/38
