= Ezio Meneghello =

Italian footballer

Personal information
- Date of birth: November 13, 1919
- Place of birth: Verona, Italy
- Date of death: October 11, 1987 (aged 67)
- Height: 1.78 m (5 ft 10 in)
- Position: Defender

Senior career*
Years	Team	Apps	(Gls)
1936–1937	Legnago		
1937–1940	Ambrosiana-Inter	6	(0)
1940–1941	Verona	22	(0)
1941–1942	Fanfulla	12	(0)
1942–1943	Suzzara		
1943–1944	Lecce		
1944–1945	Pro Italia Taranto		
1945–1947	Padova	70	(1)
1947–1948	Suzzara	32	(0)
1948–1950	Verona	24	(0)
1950–1952	Legnago		
- * Club domestic league appearances and goals

Ezio Meneghello (November 13, 1919 – October 11, 1987) was an Italian professional football player. He was born and died in Verona.

== Honours ==
- Serie A champion: 1937/38, 1939/40
- Coppa Italia winner: 1938/39
