= Francesco Antonio Calegari =

Italian composer

Father Francesco Antonio Calegari (died 1742) was an Italian baroque music theorist, composer and priest. Calegari was maestro di cappella at Basilica of Santa Maria dei Frari, Venice in 1705, and at the Basilica del Santo, Padua in the 1720s. Several manuscript copies of his treatise on consonance and dissonance survive.

The Italian oratorio La risurrezione di Lazzaro 1779, recorded under Filippo Maria Bressan in 2000, is by Antonio Calegari Another Calegari from Padua was Giuseppe Calegari, composer of a Betulia liberata (1771).
