= Duilio Setti =

Italian footballer (1912–1972)

Personal information
- Date of birth: January 7, 1912
- Place of birth: Modena, Italy
- Date of death: December 8, 1972
- Place of death: Modena, Italy
- Height: 1.83 m (6 ft 0 in)
- Position: Defender

Senior career*
Years	Team	Apps	(Gls)
1929–1934	Modena	120	(0)
1934–1937	Bari	57	(0)
1937–1941	Ambrosiana-Inter	74	(0)
1941–1942	Liguria	16	(0)
1942–1943	Parma	24	(0)
1943–1944	Modena	11	(0)
1945–1946	Parma	21	(0)
1946–1947	Vigevano	32	(0)
1947–1949	Fidenza		
- * Club domestic league appearances and goals

Duilio Setti (January 7, 1912, in Modena – December 8, 1972, in Modena) was an Italian professional footballer who played as a defender.

== Honours ==
- Serie A champion: 1937/38, 1939/40
- Coppa Italia winner: 1938/39
