= Filippo Maria Bressan =

Italian conductor

Filippo Maria Bressan (born 27 November 1957 in Este) is an Italian conductor.

Training pianist, he studied conducting with several teachers, among whom stand out Jurgen Jürgens, for the choir conducting (of which he later became assistant), and Karl Österreicher, in Vienna, for orchestra conductingspecializing himself, among others, with John Eliot Gardiner, Ferdinand Leitner and Giovanni Acciai for musicology.

Permanent conductor of Orchestra Sinfonica di Savona and of Jupiter Orchestra (formerly Orchestra dell'Accademia Musicale), he chose to work mainly in Italy or nearby. He has conducted other Orchestras including the Saint Petersburgs State Academic Symphonic Orchestra, Orchestra of Opéra Royal de Wallonie, the Orchestra Sinfonica Nazionale della RAI, the Orchestra and Choir of Accademia Nazionale di Santa Cecilia in Rome, Orchestra and Choir of Teatro La Fenice of Venice and almost all the major Italian orchestras. In the field of Opera he conducted numerous works of the baroque and classical period, favoring authors such as Händel, Gluck, Mozart, Rossini.

Many the collaborations, as conductor or choir master, both in the field of opera and symphonic, including with Claudio Abbado, Luciano Berio, Rudolf Buchbinder, Frans Brüggen, Giuliano Carmignola, Myung-whun Chung, Carlo Colombara, Enrico Dindo, Martin Fröst, Carlo Maria Giulini, Peter Maag, Lorin Maazel, Sara Mingardo, Michael Nyman, Arvo Pärt, Mstislav Leopol'dovič Rostropovič, Georges Prêtre, Giuseppe Sinopoli, Giovanni Sollima, Jeffrey Tate, Roman Vlad and many others.

He was guest conductor for five years at the Teatr Wielki in Poznań, for two years at the Teatro Lirico di Cagliari, principal conductor of the Accademia de li Musici and currently Voxonus. He is a regular guest of the major concert companies and major Italian festivals of symphonic, ancient and contemporary music (Accademia Musicale Chigiana of Siena, Venice Biennale, Festival Monteverdi of Cremona, MITO SettembreMusica, Sagra Musicale Umbra and many others). He founded Athestis Chorus & Academia de li Musici, - then Athestis Chorus & Orchestra -, a vocal and instrumental professional group specialized in the Baroque and classical repertoire, which closed its activity in 2009.

Always passionate on choral music, with choral ensembles directed by him, he won five first and two second prizes in national and international competitions and received the award of music critics in Gorizia in 1994, the Chiavi d’argento award in Chiavenna in 2004 and the award for Best Conductor at Tours in 2016.

From 2000 to 2002 he was invited to fill the position of Choir Masterof Accademia Nazionale di Santa Ceciliain Rome, in succession of Norbert Balatsch, position that he will not want to hold anymore in other Opera Houses.

He has conducted many other choral ensembles, including the Estonian Philharmonic Chamber Choir, the Estonian National Male Choir, the World Youth Choir in 2005 and 2016, the Coro Giovanile Italiano from 2003 to 2005, le Choeur National des Jeunes from 2014 to 2017, the Choirs of many Theaters and lyrical institutions.

He has collaborated in several projects on behalf of Feniarco, ECA-Europa Cantat, IFCM and in 2006 he was appointed by Prof. Bruno Cagli member of the scientific committee of the Gioachino Rossini Foundation in Pesaro.

== Discography ==
- Concerto per violino e orchestra n. 1 op. 26 by Max Bruch – Sinfonia n. 3 in la min. op. 56 Scozzese by Felix Mendelssohn B. Edoardo Zosi, violino – Filarmonica di Torino – Filippo Maria Bressan, conductor – Amadeus (Italy, February 2012)
- Messa per San Marco by Baldassarre Galuppi: Athestis Chorus & Academia de li Musici – Filippo Maria Bressan, conductor – Chandos Records (Great Britain, 2003)
- La Resurrezione di Lazzaro by Antonio Calegari: Athestis Chorus & Academia de li Musici – Filippo Maria Bressan, conductor – Chandos Records (Great Britain, 2001)
- Arianna by Benedetto Marcello: Athestis Chorus & Academia de li Musici – Filippo Maria Bressan, conductor – Chandos Records (Great Britain, 2000)
- Requiem by Benedetto Marcello: Athestis Chorus & Academia de li Musici – Filippo Maria Bressan, conductor – Chandos Records (Great Britain, 1999)
- Vespro della Beata Vergine Maria by Pier Francesco Cavalli: Athestis Chorus, Schola Gregoriana Ergo Cantemus – Filippo Maria Bressan, conductor – Tactus (Italy, 1998)
- Isolamenti 1938–1945 Vol. 5 by Gian Francesco Malipiero, Viktor Ullmann, Karl Amadeus Hartmann – Athestis Chorus – Filippo Maria Bressan, conductor – Nuova Fonit Cetra (Italy, 1996)
- Arias for Rubini – Rossini, Bellini, Donizetti: Juan Diego Florez, Coro e Orchestra dell'Accademia Nazionale di Santa Cecilia – Filippo Maria Bressan, choirmaster – Roberto Abbado, conductor (Decca, 2007)
- Pezzi sacri by Giuseppe Verdi: Coro e Orchestra dell'Accademia Nazionale di Santa Cecilia – Filippo Maria Bressan, choirmaster – Myung-Whun Chung, conductor (Deutsche Grammophon, 2000)
- Die Schöpfung (The Creation) by Franz Joseph Haydn: Athestis Chorus, Orchestra Sinfonica Nazionale della Rai – Filippo Maria Bressan, choirmaster – Jeffrey Tate, direttore – Rai (Italy, 2000) (Premio Abbiati 2000)
