= FENIARCO =

FENIARCO, acronym of Federazione Nazionale Italiana delle Associazioni Regionali Corali or Italian National Federation of Regional Choral Associations in English, is an organization representing the Italian choral community.

== History ==
It was established in 1984. It represents all regions of Italy. The Association gathers more than 2700 member choirs and 150,000 singers and partners. They are volunteers who offer music and culture through thousands of concerts, festivals, courses, conferences and meetings that are organized most of all in places not supported by institutional culture.

== International Representation ==
Feniarco is the official representative of Italian choral life at the European Choral Association – Europa Cantat (ECA-EC), and at the International Federation for Choral Music (IFCM). It participates in Europa Cantat events and has contacts and relationships with other Federations.

== Publishing ==
One of Feniarco's initiatives is publishing and research. Feniarco published works by the leading Italian choral composers: Andrea Basevi, Piero Caraba, Giuseppe Cappotto, Giuseppe Di Bianco, Orlando Dipiazza, Sandro Filippi, Battista Pradal, Pierpaolo Scattolin, Mauro Zuccante, etc.

- Choraliter, four-month magazine of Italian choral world
- Giro giro canto vol. 1, 2 e 3, new compositions for primary and junior high schools
- Teenc@nta, collection of compositions for youth choirs
- Melos, vol. 1 e 2, a chronicle of choral music in Italy through the voice of young composers and already famous authors
- Melos, vol 3
- Il respiro è già canto (F. Corti), notes of choral directions edited by Dario Tabbia
- Feniarco Editions, collection for the valorisation of contemporary Italian composers
- Choraliter, choral anthology thought as agile instrument to enrich choirs’ repertoire
- Canto "popolare" e canto corale, 3rd Day of Studies in honour of Domenico Cieri
- "Voci & Tradizione" project, one anthology for each region with songs of oral tradition harmonized or elaborated for choir (available: Friuli-Venezia Giulia, Piemonte, Tuscany)
