= Costantino Sala =

Italian footballer (born 1913)

Personal information
- Date of birth: 3 May 1913
- Place of birth: Monza, Italy
- Height: 1.70 m (5 ft 7 in)
- Position: Defender

Senior career*
Years	Team	Apps	(Gls)
1930–1931	Monza		
1931–1932	Ambrosiana-Inter	0	(0)
1932–1936	Monza		
1936–1939	Ambrosiana-Inter	9	(0)
1939–1940	Brescia	27	(0)
1940–1941	Pro Vercelli	9	(0)
1941–1943	Lecco	45	(0)
- * Club domestic league appearances and goals

Costantino Sala (born 3 May 1913 in Monza) was an Italian professional football player.

His older brother Valentino Sala played in the Serie A for Genoa C.F.C. and F.C. Internazionale Milano in the 1930s. To distinguish them, Valentino was referred to as Sala I and Costantino as Sala II.

== Honours ==
- Serie A champion: 1937/38
- Coppa Italia winner: 1938/39
