= Gino Ferrer Callegari =

Italian footballer and coach

Personal information
- Date of birth: 14 April 1911
- Place of birth: Padua, Italy
- Date of death: 14 April 1954 (aged 43)
- Place of death: Genoa, Italy
- Height: 1.74 m (5 ft 8 1/2 in)
- Position: Midfielder

Senior career*
Years	Team	Apps	(Gls)
1930–1933	Padova	74	(6)
1933–1934	Roma	20	(0)
1934–1936	Sampierdarenese	28	(1)
1936–1937	Lucchese	15	(1)
1937–1943	Liguria	139	(12)
1943–1944	Asti	12	(3)
1945–1946	Entella		

Managerial career
- 1945–1946: Entella
- * Club domestic league appearances and goals

Gino Ferrer Callegari (born 14 April 1911; died 14 April 1954) was an Italian professional football player and coach.

He played for 10 seasons (198 games, 11 goals) in the Serie A for Padova, Roma, Sampierdarenese, Lucchese and Liguria.
