= Guglielmo Trevisan =

Italian footballer and manager

Personal information
- Full name: Guglielmo Trevisan
- Date of birth: 31 January 1918
- Place of birth: Trieste, Italy
- Date of death: 23 December 2003 (aged 85)
- Place of death: Trieste, Italy
- Position: Midfielder

Senior career*
Years	Team	Apps	(Gls)
1934–1941	Triestina	117	(40)
1935–1937	→ Ponziana (loan)	?	(?)
1941–1943	Genoa	54	(26)
1943–1944	San Giusto Trieste	14	(4)
1945–1946	Genoa	58	(9)
1947–1950	Triestina	105	(15)
1950–1952	Legnano	55	(12)
1952–1953	Piacenza	31	(5)
1953–1954	Triestina	29	(1)
1954–1955	Ortona	?	(?)

International career
1940	Italy	2	(1)

Managerial career
- 1950–1952: Legnano
- 1952–1953: Piacenza
- 1954–1955: Ortona
- 1959–1961: Triestina
- 1961–1962: Cesena
- 1962–1963: Pisa
- 1963–1965: Vittorio Veneto
- 1969–1970: Triestina
- * Club domestic league appearances and goals

Guglielmo Trevisan (Italian pronunciation: [ɡuʎˈʎɛlmo treviˈzan]; 31 January 1918 – 23 December 2003) was an Italian association football manager and footballer who played as a midfielder. He represented the Italy national football team twice, the first being on 5 May 1940, the occasion of a friendly match against Germany in a 3–2 home win.
