= Stefano Callegari (chef) =

Italian chef

- Born: December 25, 1968 (age 57); Rome, Italy
- Occupations: Chef and Inventor

Stefano Callegari (born December 25, 1968) is an Italian chef and the inventor of the Trapizzino, a popular street food. Before inventing the Trapizzino, Stefano worked as a flight attendant for 15 years before returning to Rome to pursue his passion for pizza.

== Biography ==
=== Early life ===
Stefano was born in Prati, a district in the centre of Rome. He first encountered the world of pizza in 1992, when he became a delivery driver for a local bakery. Stefano learned to prepare pizza dough from the baker he was working for and, later, enrolled in a pizza-making course. For the next 15 years, Stefano worked as a flight attendant for an Italian airline.

=== Sforno ===
In 2005, Stefano opened his first restaurant, Sforno, in Rome's Cinecitta district. Stefano created a unique dough that was light, flavorful, and crispy. He experimented with different pizzas and created new versions, such as a cacio e pepe pizza.

=== 00100 (Later Trapizzino) ===
In 2008, Stefano opened 00100 in Rome's Testaccio district. After studying street food since the opening of Sforno in 2005, Stefano took inspiration from sandwiches made from pizza dough and decided to combine the simplicity of plain pizza with some of Rome's most traditional dishes to bring together the best characteristics of both elements. Stefano called this combination a Trapizzino and it became the cornerstone dish at 00100. The word Trapizzino is a combination of tramezzino (sandwich) and pizza. Stefano renamed 00100 after his creation after it became popular.

=== Trapizzino NYC ===
Encouraged by the Trapizzino's success in Rome, Stefano partnered with long-time friend and restaurateur Paul Pansera to bring the Trapizzino to the United States in 2017. Trapizzino NYC opened its doors late February, 2017.

== Philosophical views ==
In an interview with Katie Parla, a Roman food blogger, Stefano stated that his greatest inspiration is food that is made with genuine love. Stefano tries to cook food with the same love a mother would have cooking for their child. Stefano believes that traditional Roman cuisine is becoming an exotic food to the younger generations of Romans.
