= 1938 Mitropa Cup =

Tournament details
- Dates: 26 June – 11 September 1938
- Teams: 16

Final positions
- Champions: (Czechoslovakia) Slavia Prague (1st title)
- Runners-up: (Hungary) Ferencváros

Tournament statistics
- Matches played: 22
- Top scorer(s): (Czechoslovakia) Josef Bican (10 goals)

The 1938 season of the Mitropa Cup football club tournament was won by SK Slavia Prague who defeated the previous season's champions Ferencváros 4–2 on aggregate in the final. It was Slavia Prague's first and only victory in the competition.

This was the 12th edition of the tournament.

== First round ==
Team 1	Agg.	Team 2	1st leg	2nd leg
Kladno (Czechoslovakia)	5–2	(Kingdom of Yugoslavia) HAŠK	3–1	2–1
Židenice (Czechoslovakia)	3–4	(Hungary) Ferencváros	3–1	0–3
Genoa (Italy)	5–3	(Czechoslovakia) Sparta Prague	4–2	1–1
Beogradski SK (Kingdom of Yugoslavia)	3–5	(Czechoslovakia) Slavia Prague	2–3	1–2
Hungária MTK (Hungary)	4–9	(Italy) Juventus	3–3	1–6
Újpest (Hungary)	4–5	(Romania) Rapid București	4–1	0–4
Ambrosiana Inter (Italy)	5–3	(Hungary) Kispest	4–2	1–1
Ripensia Timișoara (Romania)	4–3	(Italy) Milan	3–0	1–3

== Quarterfinals ==
Team 1	Agg.	Team 2	1st leg	2nd leg
Ferencváros (Hungary)	9–5	(Romania) Ripensia Timișoara	5–4	4–1
Juventus (Italy)	6–3	(Czechoslovakia) Kladno	4–2	2–1
Slavia Prague (Czechoslovakia)	10–3	(Italy) Ambrosiana Inter	9–0	1–3
Genoa (Italy)	4–2	(Romania) Rapid București	3–0	1–2

== Semifinals ==
Team 1	Agg.	Team 2	1st leg	2nd leg
Genoa (Italy)	4–6	(Czechoslovakia) Slavia Prague	4–2	0–4
Juventus (Italy)	3–4	(Hungary) Ferencváros	3–2	0–2

== Finals ==
Team 1	Agg.	Team 2	1st leg	2nd leg
Slavia Prague (Czechoslovakia)	4–2	(Hungary) Ferencváros	2–2	2–0

4 September 1938

Slavia Prague (Czechoslovakia)	2–2	(Hungary) Ferencváros
Bican 36'; Simunek 44'	Report	Kemeny 30'; Kiss 63'

Masaryk-Stadion, Prague
Attendance: 45,000
Referee: Henry Mee (England)

11 September 1938

Ferencváros (Hungary)	0–2	(Czechoslovakia) Slavia Prague
	Report	Vytlacil 57'; Simunek 71'

Üllői úti, Budapest
Attendance: 40,000
Referee: Arthur Jewell (England)

1938 Mitropa Cup Champions

Slavia Prague
1st Title

== Top goalscorers ==
Rank	Player	Team	Goals
1	(Czechoslovakia) Josef Bican	(Czechoslovakia) Slavia Prague	10
2	(Hungary) György Sárosi	(Hungary) Ferencváros	7
3	(Czechoslovakia) Rudolf Vytlačil	(Czechoslovakia) Slavia Prague	6
