= Umberto Busani =

Italian footballer

Personal information
- Full name: Umberto Busani
- Date of birth: February 1, 1915
- Place of birth: Parma, Italy
- Date of death: 29 October 1957 (aged 42)
- Place of death: Naples, Italy
- Position: Forward

Senior career*
Years	Team	Apps	(Gls)
1931–1933	OND Chievo	22	(13)
1933–1934	Hellas Verona	2	(0)
1934–1935	GC Vigevanesi	29	(6)
1935–1936	Alessandria	28	(7)
1936–1940	Lazio	106	(38)
1940–1948	Napoli	171	(46)
1945	Frattese	?	(15)
1948–1950	Casertana	34	(22)
- * Club domestic league appearances and goals

Umberto Busani (1 February 1915 – 29 October 1957) was an Italian footballer who played as a forward for a number of Italian clubs in the 1930s and 1940s, most notably S.S. Lazio and S.S.C. Napoli.

== Playing career ==
Umberto Busani is regarded as one of the best wingers in S.S.C. Napoli's history. He started his career at Chievo, where he helped Chievo reach the final of the championship.

He then moved on to Alexandria, for whom he made his Serie A debut on 22 September 1935. He played in the cup final played in Genoa on 11 June 1936, but his side lost against Turin. He then moved to S.S. Lazio in 1936 for a joint fee of 400,000 lira, along with teammates Luigi Milano and Giovanni Riccardi.

He made his debut on 13 September 1936 in a 3–0 victory over A.C. Milan. The club finished in second place in the final standings, three points behind champions Bologna. He was the fifth most prolific goalscorer with fifteen goals that year. The following years were less positive for the biancoazzurri; an eighth place in the championship was followed by a ninth-place finish in 1938–39. In his early years in Rome he invariably started matches, missing only a few games, the majority due to a fractured collarbone.

He moved to Napoli in 1940 and the Neapolitan side finished the 1940–41 season in eighth place. The following year, Busani was the club's top scorer, but Napoli succumbed to relegation, despite some memorable victories against Milan and Juventus. The 1942–43 season, Napoli's first in Serie B, saw him play all the games and score 10 goals (the team's third top scorer), but this was not enough to bring the team promotion.

After the war he returned to Napoli and he finished as the club's top scorer in 1946–47 with 12 goals. The next season was negative for both Napoli and Busani, ending with the relegation back in Serie B; he played only 12 games and scored two goals, so decided to finish his career at Casertana.

== Post-retirement ==
After retiring, Busani settled in Campania, where he ran a sports shop and coached local sides.
