= Carmelo Buonocore =

Italian footballer (1912-1982)

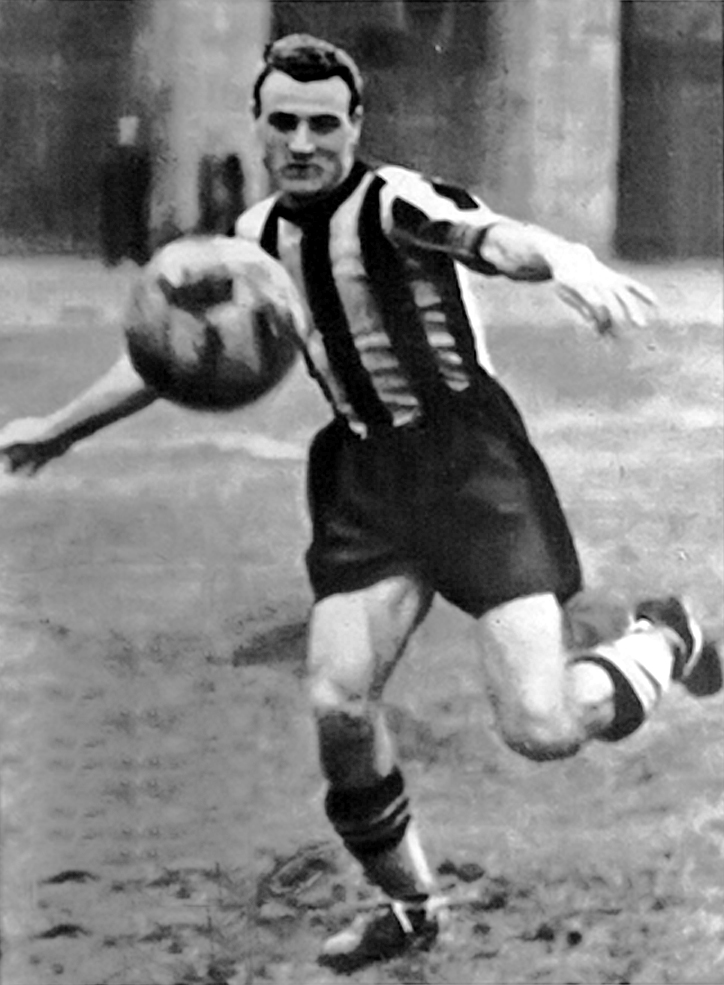

Personal information
- Date of birth: 19 February 1912
- Place of birth: Capua, Italy
- Date of death: 1982
- Height: 1.74 m (5 ft 8 1/2 in)
- Position: Defender

Senior career*
Years	Team	Apps	(Gls)
1929–1933	Peloro Messina	60	(0)
1933–1934	Palmese		
1934–1936	Messina	63	(1)
1936–1945	Ambrosiana-Inter	148	(0)
1945–1947	Lecco	57	(0)
- * Club domestic league appearances and goals

Carmelo Buonocore (19 February 1912 in Capua – 1982) was an Italian professional football player.

== Honours ==
- Serie A champion: 1937/38, 1939/40.
- Coppa Italia winner: 1938/39.
