= Angelo Bollano =

Italian footballer (1918-1978)

Personal information
- Full name: Angelo Bollano Bisio
- Date of birth: 6 July 1918
- Place of birth: Genoa, Italy
- Date of death: 1978 (aged 59–60)
- Place of death: Italy
- Positions: Midfielder; striker

Senior career*
Years	Team	Apps	(Gls)
1936–1937	Sampierdarenese	15	(6)
1937–1941	Liguria	98	(34)
1941–1942	AC Milan	25	(8)
1942–1943	Fiorentina	25	(11)
1944	Liguria	14	(2)
1945–1946	Spezia		
1946–1948	Fiorentina	50	(7)
1948–1950	Marseille	25	(12)
1950–1951	Real Murcia	13	(2)
- * Club domestic league appearances and goals

Angelo Bollano Bisio (6 July 1918 – 1978) was an Italian footballer who played in Italy for Sampierdarenese, Liguria, AC Milan, Fiorentina and Spezia, as well as for Marseille in France and Real Murcia in Spain.
