= Lorenzo Suber =

Italian footballer

Personal information
- Date of birth: 10 June 1912
- Place of birth: Bagnaria Arsa, Italy
- Height: 1.69 m (5 ft 6 1/2 in)
- Position: Midfielder

Senior career*
Years	Team	Apps	(Gls)
1931–1933	Cividalese		
1933–1934	Udinese	22	(?)
1934–1937	Pisa	72	(5)
1937–1938	Venezia	24	(8)
1938–1940	Ambrosiana-Inter	1	(0)
- * Club domestic league appearances and goals

Lorenzo Suber (born 10 June 1912 in Bagnaria Arsa) was an Italian professional football player.

== Honours ==
- Coppa Italia winner: 1938/39
