= Football league =

The Football League (now English Football League) is an English professional association football league.

Football League may also refer to:

== American football ==
- American Football League
- Arena Football League
- China Arena Football League
- Indoor Football League (1999–2000)
- Indoor Football League (2008)
- Independent Women's Football League
- Legends Football League
- National Football League
- NFL Europe
- Women's American Football League
- Women's Arena Football League
- Women's Football Alliance
- Women's Professional Football League
- World Football League
- World Football League (2008–2010)

== Association football ==
- Bulgarian Professional Football League
- Croatian First Football League
- Football League (Greece)
- Highland Football League
- Japan Football League (1992–1998)
- Japan Football League
- J.League (Japan Professional Football League)
- Gibraltar Football League
- Macedonian First Football League
- National Football League (India)
- National Football League (South Africa)
- Northern Football League
- Scottish Football League
- Scottish Professional Football League
- Southern Football League

== Australian football ==
- Australian Football League
- South Australian National Football League
- United States Australian Football League
- Victorian Football League
- West Australian Football League

== Canadian football ==
- Canadian Football League

== Gaelic football ==
- Ladies' National Football League
- National Football League (Ireland)

== Rugby football ==
- Rugby Football League

== See also ==
- National League (disambiguation)
- Midland Football League (disambiguation)
- National Football League (disambiguation)
- Northern Football League (disambiguation)
- Professional Indoor Football League (disambiguation)
- Southern Football League (disambiguation)
- Sports league
