= Derby della Capitale =

Club football rivalry in Rome, Italy

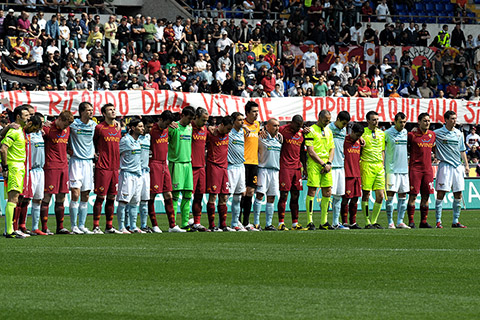
- Players from both Lazio and Roma observing a moment of silence for the victims of the L'Aquila earthquake before the 11 April 2009 match
- Other names: Rome derby
- Location: Rome
- Teams: Lazio; Roma
- First meeting: 8 December 1929; Serie A Lazio 0–1 Roma
- Latest meeting: 17 May 2026; Serie A Roma 2–0 Lazio
- Stadiums: Stadio Olimpico

Statistics
- Total meetings: Official matches: 187; Unofficial matches: 16; Total matches: 203
- Most wins: Official matches: Roma (71); Unofficial matches: Lazio (7); Total matches: Roma (77)
- Most player appearances: Francesco Totti (44)
- Top scorer: Dino da Costa; Francesco Totti (11 each)
- Largest victory: Roma 5–0 Lazio; Serie A (1 November 1933)

The Derby della Capitale (English: Derby of the capital city), also known as Derby Capitolino and Derby del Cupolone, as well as The Rome Derby in English and Derby di Roma in Italian, is the football local derby in Rome, Italy, between Lazio and Roma. It is considered to be one of the fiercest intra-city derbies in the country, along with the other major local derbies, Derby della Madonnina (Milan derby) and Derby della Mole (Turin derby), and one of the greatest and most hotly contested derbies in Europe.

== History ==
=== Football rivalry ===
Lazio was founded in 1900 in Piazza della Libertà, Borough of Prati and initially played at the Rondinella field in the upper-class quartiere of Parioli. Roma began playing at the Motovelodromo Appio and subsequently, when the new stadium was built after only two years, moved to the working-class rione of Testaccio. Thus, the Lazio ultras traditionally occupy the northern end (Curva Nord) and Roma's the southern end (Curva Sud) of the Stadio Olimpico. Making ironic remarks, known as sfottò, focused on the origins of both sets of fans, is a traditional way of teasing between the supporters of Lazio and Roma.

Roma was founded in 1927 as a result of a merger between three teams: Roman, Alba-Audace and Fortitudo, initiated by Italo Foschi. It was the intention of Fascist dictator Benito Mussolini to create a unified Roman club to challenge the dominance of northern clubs such as Juventus. Thanks to the influence of Giorgio Vaccaro, a member of the National Fascist Party, Lazio was the only major team from Rome to be excluded from the merger and remain independent, thus a kind of rivalry emerged from the very early years of the coexistence in the same city.

In 1979, Lazio fan Vincenzo Paparelli was hit in the eye and killed by a flare fired by a Roma fan from the opposite end of the stadium, becoming the first fatality in Italian football due to violence.

On 17 December 2000, Lazio's Paolo Negro scored an own goal in a 1–0 Roma victory. Roma eventually went on to lift the scudetto that season, as Lazio finished the season in third place. Negro continues to be taunted by Roma fans for the goal.

The derby on 21 March 2004 was abandoned four minutes into the second half with the score tied at 0–0, when a riot broke out in the stand; the president of the Lega Nazionale Professionisti, Adriano Galliani, ordered referee Roberto Rosetti to suspend the match. The riots began with the spreading of a rumour that a boy had been killed by a police car just outside the stadium. In fact, from last row of the stadium, some fans noticed in the square below a body covered with a white sheet. Later, medics who put the sheet explained that the boy had difficulty breathing, dangerously exacerbated by the air full of tear gas, and then the sheet was used as a filter. The denial by the police, spread through the speakers of the stadium, though it was not able to remove all doubt. Roma captain Francesco Totti then asked for the match to be called off, at which point President Galliani was reached by the referee by mobile phone—from the pitch—and ordered the game postponed. After the match was postponed, a prolonged battle between fans and police, with streets near the stadium being set on fire, eventually resulting in 13 arrests and over 170 injured among the police alone. The match was replayed on 28 March and ended in a 1–1 draw with no crowd trouble.

On 26 May 2013, the teams met in the 2013 Coppa Italia Final, the first cup final in the history of the fixture. Lazio won the match 1–0 with a goal by Senad Lulić in the 71st minute, a low right footed shot from a low cross from the right by Antonio Candreva after the goalkeeper Bogdan Lobonț failed to cut out the crossed ball.

On 15 January 2015, Roma's Francesco Totti, playing in his 40th derby, scored twice to salvage a 2–2 draw for Roma, becoming the all-time leading goalscorer in the fixture. He celebrated by taking a selfie in front of Roma's fans in the Curva Sud, having given his phone to the goalkeeping coach before kick off.

On 4 December 2016, Roma recorded their fourth victory in a row against Lazio and extended their unbeaten run in the fixture to seven games with a 0–2 away victory. However, the game was marred by controversy, with Lazio's Danilo Cataldi sent off for grabbing Roma's Kevin Strootman, after Strootman had thrown the contents of a water bottle in Cataldi's face after scoring the opening goal, sparking a mass brawl. Strootman subsequently received a two match ban for his role in the incident. Lazio's Senad Lulić was also given a 20-day ban for offensive comments made towards Roma's Antonio Rüdiger after the game.

=== Cultural rivalry ===
The devout regionalism that is perceived throughout the country is one of the reasons that make the derby more heated, as the fans view it as a battle between two clubs fighting for the right to represent the city in the rest of the country and local bragging rights. This is partly fueled by the fact that Italian football has mostly been dominated by three clubs, all of which are based in Northern Italy – namely Juventus in Turin and Milan and Internazionale in Milan.

The Rome derby has been the scene of several actions related to the political views of the fan bases. Lazio's ultras used to use swastikas and fascist symbols on their banners, and they have displayed racist behaviour on several occasions during the derbies. In particular, at a match in the 1998–99 season, Laziali unfurled a 50-metre banner around the Curva Nord that read "Auschwitz is your town, the ovens are your houses". Black players of Roma have often been targets of racist and offensive behaviour.

In November 2015, Roma's ultras and their Lazio counterparts boycotted Roma's 2–0 victory in the Derby della Capitale in a protest against the new safety measures imposed at the Stadio Olimpico. The measures, imposed by Rome's prefect, Franco Gabrielli, had involved plastic glass dividing walls being installed in both the Curva Sud and Curva Nord, splitting the sections behind each goal in two. Both sets of ultras continued their protests for the rest of the season, including during Roma's 4–1 victory in the return fixture. Lazio's ultras returned to the Curva Nord for Roma's 2–0 victory in December 2016, but the Roma ultras continue to boycott games.

In 2017, Lazio fans left anti-Semitic stickers of Anne Frank in a Roma jersey, as well as graffiti, at the Stadio Olimpico. The resulting controversy sparked a police investigation. On 30 April 2017, Lazio beat Roma 3–1 in a Serie A match, and four days later, Lazio ultras hung dummies with Roma jerseys from a pedestrian walkway near the Colosseum in the Italian capital. The mannequins were accompanied with a banner read "a warning without offence ... sleep with the lights on!"

== Official match results ==
- SF = Semi-finals
- QF = Quarter-finals
- R16 = Round of 16
- GS = Group stage
- R1 = Round 1

Lazio win Draw Roma win

Season	Competition	Date	Home team	Result	Away team
1929–30	Serie A	8 December 1929	Lazio	0–1	Roma
1929–30	Serie A	4 May 1930	Roma	3–1	Lazio
1930–31	Serie A	7 December 1930	Roma	1–1	Lazio
1930–31	Serie A	24 May 1931	Lazio	2–2	Roma
1931–32	Serie A	6 December 1931	Roma	2–0	Lazio
1931–32	Serie A	1 May 1932	Lazio	1–4	Roma
1932–33	Serie A	23 October 1932	Lazio	2–1	Roma
1932–33	Serie A	26 March 1933	Roma	3–1	Lazio
1933–34	Serie A	1 November 1933	Roma	5–0	Lazio
1933–34	Serie A	11 March 1934	Lazio	3–3	Roma
1934–35	Serie A	18 November 1934	Roma	1–1	Lazio
1934–35	Serie A	1 March 1935	Lazio	0–0	Roma
1935–36	Serie A	13 October 1935	Lazio	0–1	Roma
1935–36	Coppa Italia R16	19 January 1936	Lazio	2–1	Roma
1935–36	Serie A	16 February 1936	Roma	1–0	Lazio
1936–37	Serie A	18 October 1936	Roma	3–1	Lazio
1936–37	Serie A	21 February 1937	Lazio	0–1	Roma
1937–38	Serie A	3 October 1937	Lazio	1–1	Roma
1937–38	Serie A	6 February 1938	Roma	2–1	Lazio
1938–39	Serie A	15 January 1939	Roma	0–2	Lazio
1938–39	Serie A	21 May 1939	Lazio	1–3	Roma
1939–40	Serie A	7 January 1940	Roma	1–0	Lazio
1939–40	Serie A	26 May 1940	Lazio	1–0	Roma
1940–41	Serie A	24 November 1940	Roma	1–1	Lazio
1940–41	Serie A	16 March 1941	Lazio	2–0	Roma
1941–42	Serie A	11 January 1942	Roma	2–1	Lazio
1941–42	Serie A	24 May 1942	Lazio	1–1	Roma
1942–43	Serie A	22 November 1942	Lazio	3–1	Roma
1942–43	Serie A	7 March 1943	Roma	1–0	Lazio
1942–43	Coppa Italia QF	15 May 1943	Roma	2–1	Lazio
1945–46	Serie A-B	23 December 1945	Lazio	1–2	Roma
1945–46	Serie A-B	24 March 1946	Roma	0–1	Lazio
1946–47	Serie A	6 October 1946	Roma	3–0	Lazio
1946–47	Serie A	2 March 1947	Lazio	0–0	Roma
1947–48	Serie A	16 November 1947	Lazio	0–1	Roma
1947–48	Serie A	21 April 1948	Roma	0–2	Lazio
1948–49	Serie A	17 October 1948	Roma	1–1	Lazio
1948–49	Serie A	6 February 1949	Lazio	0–0	Roma
1949–50	Serie A	16 November 1949	Lazio	3–1	Roma
1949–50	Serie A	19 February 1950	Roma	0–0	Lazio
1950–51	Serie A	15 October 1950	Roma	0–1	Lazio
1950–51	Serie A	25 February 1951	Lazio	2–1	Roma
1952–53	Serie A	16 November 1952	Lazio	1–0	Roma
1952–53	Serie A	22 March 1953	Roma	0–2	Lazio
1953–54	Serie A	29 November 1953	Roma	1–1	Lazio
1953–54	Serie A	18 April 1954	Lazio	1–2	Roma
1954–55	Serie A	17 October 1954	Lazio	1–1	Roma
1954–55	Serie A	6 March 1955	Roma	1–3	Lazio
1955–56	Serie A	16 October 1955	Roma	0–0	Lazio
1955–56	Serie A	4 April 1956	Lazio	1–0	Roma
1956–57	Serie A	14 October 1956	Lazio	0–3	Roma
1956–57	Serie A	3 March 1957	Roma	2–2	Lazio
1957–58	Serie A	27 October 1957	Roma	3–0	Lazio
1957–58	Serie A	16 March 1958	Lazio	2–1	Roma
1957–58	Coppa Italia GS	21 June 1958	Roma	2–3	Lazio
1957–58	Coppa Italia GS	12 July 1958	Lazio	1–1	Roma
1958–59	Serie A	30 November 1958	Lazio	1–3	Roma
1958–59	Serie A	12 April 1959	Roma	3–0	Lazio
1959–60	Serie A	18 October 1959	Roma	3–0	Lazio
1959–60	Serie A	6 March 1960	Lazio	0–1	Roma
1960–61	Serie A	13 November 1960	Lazio	0–4	Roma
1960–61	Serie A	19 March 1961	Roma	1–2	Lazio
1961–62	Coppa Italia R16	25 April 1962	Roma	0–0 (Note: Roma won 6–4 on penalties)	Lazio
1963–64	Serie A	6 October 1963	Roma	0–0	Lazio
1963–64	Serie A	23 February 1964	Lazio	1–1	Roma
1964–65	Serie A	15 November 1964	Lazio	0–0	Roma
1964–65	Serie A	28 March 1965	Roma	0–0	Lazio
1965–66	Serie A	10 October 1965	Roma	0–1	Lazio
1965–66	Serie A	27 February 1966	Lazio	0–0	Roma
1966–67	Serie A	22 October 1966	Lazio	0–1	Roma
1966–67	Serie A	5 March 1967	Roma	0–0	Lazio
1968–69	Coppa Italia GS	8 September 1968	Roma	1–0	Lazio
1969–70	Coppa Italia GS	7 September 1969	Lazio	0–2 (Note: Roma won the match 2–0 by walkover)	Roma
1969–70	Serie A	26 October 1969	Roma	2–1	Lazio
1969–70	Serie A	1 March 1970	Lazio	1–1	Roma
1970–71	Coppa Italia GS	6 September 1970	Roma	2–0	Lazio
1970–71	Serie A	15 November 1970	Lazio	1–1	Roma
1970–71	Serie A	14 March 1971	Roma	2–2	Lazio
1971–72	Coppa Italia R1	29 August 1971	Lazio	1–0	Roma
1972–73	Serie A	12 November 1972	Roma	0–1	Lazio
1972–73	Serie A	11 March 1973	Lazio	2–0	Roma
1973–74	Coppa Italia R1	9 September 1973	Roma	0–0	Lazio
1973–74	Serie A	9 December 1973	Lazio	2–1	Roma
1973–74	Serie A	31 March 1974	Roma	1–2	Lazio
1974–75	Coppa Italia R1	22 September 1974	Lazio	0–1	Roma
1974–75	Serie A	1 December 1974	Roma	1–0	Lazio
1974–75	Serie A	23 March 1975	Lazio	0–1	Roma
1975–76	Serie A	16 November 1975	Lazio	1–1	Roma
1975–76	Serie A	14 March 1976	Roma	0–0	Lazio
1976–77	Serie A	28 November 1976	Lazio	1–0	Roma
1976–77	Serie A	27 March 1977	Roma	1–0	Lazio
1977–78	Serie A	20 November 1977	Roma	0–0	Lazio
1977–78	Serie A	19 March 1978	Lazio	1–1	Roma
1978–79	Serie A	12 November 1978	Lazio	0–0	Roma
1978–79	Serie A	18 March 1979	Roma	1–2	Lazio

Season	Competition	Date	Home team	Result	Away team
1979–80	Serie A	28 October 1979	Roma	1–1	Lazio
1979–80	Serie A	2 March 1980	Lazio	1–2	Roma
1983–84	Serie A	23 October 1983	Lazio	0–2	Roma
1983–84	Serie A	26 February 1984	Roma	2–2	Lazio
1984–85	Coppa Italia GS	9 September 1984	Roma	2–0	Lazio
1984–85	Serie A	11 November 1984	Roma	0–0	Lazio
1984–85	Serie A	24 March 1985	Lazio	1–1	Roma
1988–89	Serie A	15 January 1989	Lazio	1–0	Roma
1988–89	Serie A	28 May 1989	Roma	0–0	Lazio
1989–90	Serie A	19 November 1989	Roma	1–1	Lazio
1989–90	Serie A	18 March 1990	Lazio	0–1	Roma
1990–91	Serie A	2 December 1990	Lazio	1–1	Roma
1990–91	Serie A	6 April 1991	Roma	1–1	Lazio
1991–92	Serie A	6 October 1991	Roma	1–1	Lazio
1991–92	Serie A	1 March 1992	Lazio	1–1	Roma
1992–93	Serie A	29 November 1992	Lazio	1–1	Roma
1992–93	Serie A	18 April 1993	Roma	0–0	Lazio
1993–94	Serie A	24 October 1993	Roma	1–1	Lazio
1993–94	Serie A	6 March 1994	Lazio	1–0	Roma
1994–95	Serie A	27 November 1994	Lazio	0–3	Roma
1994–95	Serie A	23 April 1995	Roma	0–2	Lazio
1995–96	Serie A	1 October 1995	Roma	0–0	Lazio
1995–96	Serie A	18 February 1996	Lazio	1–0	Roma
1996–97	Serie A	8 December 1996	Lazio	0–0	Roma
1996–97	Serie A	4 May 1997	Roma	1–1	Lazio
1997–98	Serie A	2 November 1997	Roma	1–3	Lazio
1997–98	Coppa Italia QF	6 January 1998	Lazio	4–1	Roma
1997–98	Coppa Italia QF	21 January 1998	Roma	1–2	Lazio
1997–98	Serie A	8 March 1998	Lazio	2–0	Roma
1998–99	Serie A	29 November 1998	Lazio	3–3	Roma
1998–99	Serie A	11 April 1999	Roma	3–1	Lazio
1999–2000	Serie A	21 November 1999	Roma	4–1	Lazio
1999–2000	Serie A	25 March 2000	Lazio	2–1	Roma
2000–01	Serie A	17 December 2000	Lazio	0–1	Roma
2000–01	Serie A	29 April 2001	Roma	2–2	Lazio
2001–02	Serie A	27 October 2001	Roma	2–0	Lazio
2001–02	Serie A	10 March 2002	Lazio	1–5	Roma
2002–03	Serie A	27 October 2002	Lazio	2–2	Roma
2002–03	Coppa Italia SF	5 February 2003	Lazio	1–2	Roma
2002–03	Serie A	8 March 2003	Roma	1–1	Lazio
2002–03	Coppa Italia SF	16 April 2003	Roma	1–0	Lazio
2003–04	Serie A	9 November 2003	Roma	2–0	Lazio
2003–04	Serie A	21 April 2004	Lazio	1–1	Roma
2004–05	Serie A	6 January 2005	Lazio	3–1	Roma
2004–05	Serie A	15 May 2005	Roma	0–0	Lazio
2005–06	Serie A	23 October 2005	Roma	1–1	Lazio
2005–06	Serie A	26 February 2006	Lazio	0–2	Roma
2006–07	Serie A	10 December 2006	Lazio	3–0	Roma
2006–07	Serie A	29 April 2007	Roma	0–0	Lazio
2007–08	Serie A	31 October 2007	Roma	3–2	Lazio
2007–08	Serie A	19 March 2008	Lazio	3–2	Roma
2008–09	Serie A	16 November 2008	Roma	1–0	Lazio
2008–09	Serie A	11 April 2009	Lazio	4–2	Roma
2009–10	Serie A	6 December 2009	Roma	1–0	Lazio
2009–10	Serie A	18 April 2010	Lazio	1–2	Roma
2010–11	Serie A	7 November 2010	Lazio	0–2	Roma
2010–11	Coppa Italia R16	19 January 2011	Roma	2–1	Lazio
2010–11	Serie A	13 March 2011	Roma	2–0	Lazio
2011–12	Serie A	16 October 2011	Lazio	2–1	Roma
2011–12	Serie A	4 March 2012	Roma	1–2	Lazio
2012–13	Serie A	11 November 2012	Lazio	3–2	Roma
2012–13	Serie A	8 April 2013	Roma	1–1	Lazio
2012–13	Coppa Italia Final	26 May 2013	Roma	0–1	Lazio
2013–14	Serie A	22 September 2013	Roma	2–0	Lazio
2013–14	Serie A	9 February 2014	Lazio	0–0	Roma
2014–15	Serie A	11 January 2015	Roma	2–2	Lazio
2014–15	Serie A	25 May 2015	Lazio	1–2	Roma
2015–16	Serie A	8 November 2015	Roma	2–0	Lazio
2015–16	Serie A	3 April 2016	Lazio	1–4	Roma
2016–17	Serie A	4 December 2016	Lazio	0–2	Roma
2016–17	Coppa Italia SF	1 March 2017	Lazio	2–0	Roma
2016–17	Coppa Italia SF	4 April 2017	Roma	3–2	Lazio
2016–17	Serie A	30 April 2017	Roma	1–3	Lazio
2017–18	Serie A	18 November 2017	Roma	2–1	Lazio
2017–18	Serie A	15 April 2018	Lazio	0–0	Roma
2018–19	Serie A	29 September 2018	Roma	3–1	Lazio
2018–19	Serie A	2 March 2019	Lazio	3–0	Roma
2019–20	Serie A	1 September 2019	Lazio	1–1	Roma
2019–20	Serie A	26 January 2020	Roma	1–1	Lazio
2020–21	Serie A	15 January 2021	Lazio	3–0	Roma
2020–21	Serie A	15 May 2021	Roma	2–0	Lazio
2021–22	Serie A	26 September 2021	Lazio	3–2	Roma
2021–22	Serie A	20 March 2022	Roma	3–0	Lazio
2022–23	Serie A	6 November 2022	Roma	0–1	Lazio
2022–23	Serie A	19 March 2023	Lazio	1–0	Roma
2023–24	Serie A	12 November 2023	Lazio	0–0	Roma
2023–24	Coppa Italia QF	10 January 2024	Lazio	1–0	Roma
2023–24	Serie A	6 April 2024	Roma	1–0	Lazio
2024–25	Serie A	5 January 2025	Roma	2–0	Lazio
2024–25	Serie A	13 April 2025	Lazio	1–1	Roma
2025–26	Serie A	21 September 2025	Lazio	0–1	Roma
2025–26	Serie A	17 May 2026	Roma	2–0	Lazio

== Statistics and records ==
As of 17 May 2026

Competition	Matches	Lazio wins	Draws	Roma wins	Lazio goals	Roma goals
Divisione Nazionale	2	1	0	1	2	2
Serie A	164	42	62	60	157	205
Coppa Italia	21	8	3	10	22	24
Total official matches	187	51	65	71	181	231
Campionato Romano	4	1	2	1	3	2
Friendlies	4	2	1	1	10	9
Other meetings	8	4	0	4	9	11
Total matches	203	58	68	77	203	253

- The first derby was played on 8 December 1929, and ended 1–0 for Roma with a goal by Rodolfo Volk. Lazio won its first derby on 23 October 1932 with goals by Demaría (L), Volk (R) and Castelli (L).
- The biggest win in a derby was the 5–0 victory for Roma in 1933–34. The biggest win for Lazio was the 3–0 victory in 2006–07, 2018–19 and 2020–21.
- Roma holds the record for the most consecutive derby wins with five, while Lazio holds the record for most wins in a single season, winning four derbies in the 1997–98 season: two in the league (3–1 and 2–0) and two in the quarter-finals of the Coppa Italia (4–1 and 2–1).
- Only on one occasion was the derby played as a cup final, on 26 May 2013. Lazio won 1–0, winning their sixth Coppa Italia title.

=== Goalscorers ===
As of 17 May 2026

Rank	Player	Club(s)	League	Cup	Total
1	(Italy) Dino da Costa	Roma	9	2	11
1	(Italy) Francesco Totti	Roma	11	0	11
3	(Italy) Marco Delvecchio	Roma	9	0	9
4	(Italy) Vincenzo Montella	Roma	7	1	8
5	(Italy) Silvio Piola	Lazio	6	1	7
5	(Italy) Rodolfo Volk	Roma	7	0	7
7	(Italy) Ciro Immobile	Lazio	4	2	6
8	(Italy) Amedeo Amadei	Roma	5	0	5
8	(Italy) Giorgio Chinaglia	Lazio	4	1	5
8	(Brazil) Alejandro Demaría	Lazio	5	0	5
8	(Argentina) Pedro Manfredini	Roma	5	0	5
8	(Italy) Tommaso Rocchi	Lazio	5	0	5
8	(Sweden) Arne Selmosson	Lazio; Roma	5	0	5

=== Players ===
- Francesco Totti has played the most derbies, with 44 for Roma. The player with the most derby appearances for Lazio is Giuseppe Wilson, with 23.
- Francesco Totti and Dino da Costa have scored the most goals in the derbies, with each player scoring 11 for Roma. The top scorer for Lazio in the derby is Silvio Piola, with 7 goals.
- Vincenzo Montella holds the record for the most goals scored in a single derby; on 11 March 2002, he scored four goals in a 5–1 Roma victory.
- Arne Selmosson, Aleksandar Kolarov and Pedro are the only three players which have scored in the derby for both teams.
- Francesco Totti has won the most derbies, with 15 for Roma. The second player is Daniele De Rossi who won 14 derbies as a Roma player and 1 as Roma coach.

== Honours ==
Lazio	Competition	Roma
Domestic
2	Serie A	3
7	Coppa Italia	9
5	Supercoppa Italiana	2
1	Serie B	1
15	Total	15
European and worldwide
1	UEFA Cup Winners' Cup (defunct)	—
—	UEFA Conference League	1
1	UEFA Super Cup	—
—	Inter-Cities Fairs Cup (defunct)	1
2	Total	2
17	Grand total	17

Note: Roma won the Inter-Cities Fairs Cup once, but it does not count towards their official European record.

=== Chronological order of honours ===
Competition	1942	1958	1964	1969	1974	1980	1981	1983	1984	1986	1991	1998	1999	2000	2001	2004	2007	2008	2009	2013	2017	2019	2022	Total
Serie A	Roma				Lazio			Roma						Lazio	Roma									5
Coppa Italia		Lazio	Roma	Roma		Roma	Roma		Roma	Roma	Roma	Lazio		Lazio		Lazio	Roma	Roma	Lazio	Lazio		Lazio		16
Supercoppa Italiana												Lazio		Lazio	Roma		Roma		Lazio		Lazio	Lazio		7
UEFA Cup Winners' Cup													Lazio											1
UEFA Conference League																							Roma	1
UEFA Super Cup													Lazio											1

== Head-to-head ranking in Serie A (1930–2026) ==
P.	30	31	32	33	34	35	36	37	38	39	40	41	42	43	46	47	48	49	50	51	52	53	54	55	56	57	58	59	60	61	62	63	64	65	66	67	68	69	70	71	72	73	74	75	76	77	78	79	80	81	82	83	84	85	86	87	88	89	90	91	92	93	94	95	96	97	98	99	00	01	02	03	04	05	06	07	08	09	10	11	12	13	14	15	16	17	18	19	20	21	22	23	24	25	26
1													1																														1									1																	1	1																									
2		2					2	2																																										2			2		2									2				2			2		2		2	2	2		2				2	2		2						2			
3			3																					3	3	3																3		3							3						3								3					3						3								3	3		3								3
4						4					4								4	4	4																							4																			4			4	4					4									4								4						
5				5	5	5				5			5														5			5	5	5														5															5	5		5	5			5												5						5	5		5		5			5	
6	6								6						6							6	6		6			6												6									6										6										6		6		6					6		6		6						6		6	6	6	6		
7							7				7				7																										7													7		7							7				7														7	7								7			7	7	
8		8							8																								8		8			8	8				8			8	8	8										8														8		8											8			8							
9														9															9					9																									9	9																							9												9
10				10	10			10		10						10	10					10														10	10								10													10			10	10																10																	
11												11		11									11					11											11			11					11													11																																			
12																								12			12		12				12		12													12																		12											12		12																
13			13															13																											13								13																					13																					
14												14						14								14								14																																																													
15	15															15																				15				15														15																																									
16																																																	16																										16																				
17																	17		17																																																																												
18																														18																																																																	
19																				19																																																																											
20																																																																																															

• Summary: Roma with 53 higher finishes and Lazio with 30 higher finishes as of the end of the 2025–26 season (only including seasons in which both teams played in Serie A).

Notes:

- Lazio spent eleven seasons in Serie B, and Roma one season in Serie B.
- Only Roma qualified for the final round of 8 teams in 1946; Lazio finished 7th in their group and didn't qualify.
- Both teams finished with the same number of points in 1943, but Lazio had better goal difference.

== Players who played for both clubs ==
Lazio, then Roma

- 1928: (Italy) Fulvio Bernardini (via Inter Milan; then managed both, Roma (1949–1950) and Lazio (1958–1960))
- 1935: (Italy) Piero Pastore (via Perugia)
- 1938: (Italy) Attilio Ferraris (return)
- 1958: (Sweden) Arne Selmosson
- 1987: (Italy) Lionello Manfredonia (via Juventus)
- 1995: (Italy) Luigi Di Biagio (via Monza, then Foggia)
- 2001: (Italy) Diego Fuser (via Parma)
- 2017: (Serbia) Aleksandar Kolarov (via Manchester City)

Roma, then Lazio

- 1927: (Italy) Attilio Ferraris (then back to Roma in 1938)
- 1938: (Italy) Luigi Allemandi (via Venezia)
- 1972: (Italy) Sergio Petrelli
- 1985: (Italy) Astutillo Malgioglio
- 1993: (Italy) Fabrizio Di Mauro (via Fiorentina)
- 1998: (Federal Republic of Yugoslavia) Siniša Mihajlović (via Sampdoria)
- 2000: (Italy) Francesco Colonnese (via Napoli then Inter Milan)
- 2000: (Italy) Angelo Peruzzi (via Juventus, then Inter Milan)
- 2003: (Italy) Roberto Muzzi (via Cagliari, then Udinese)
- 2004: (Italy) Sebastiano Siviglia (via Parma, Atalanta and Lecce)
- 2021: (Spain) Pedro
- 2022: (Italy) Alessio Romagnoli (via Milan)
- 2023: (Italy) Luca Pellegrini (via Juventus, Cagliari, Genoa and Eintracht Frankfurt)

== See also ==
- Football derbies in Italy
