= NFAL =

NFAL may refer to:

- Newfoundland and Labrador
- Nepean Fine Arts League, a museum in Ottawa. (see List of museums in Ottawa)
- Near-field acoustic levitation

== See also ==
- NAFL (disambiguation)
- NFL (disambiguation)
