= 1977–78 Serie C =

Italian football league tournament

The 1977–78 Serie C was the fortieth edition of Serie C, the third highest league in the Italian football league system.

== Girone A ==
Serie C Gir. A 1977-78 team distribution
Serie C Gir. B 1977-78 team distribution
Serie C Gir. B 1977-78 team distribution in Tuscany
Serie C Gir. C 1977-78 team distribution
Serie C Gir. C 1977-78 team distribution in Campania

Pos	Team	Pld	W	D	L	GF	GA	GD	Pts	Promotion or relegation
1	Udinese	38	22	14	2	57	17	+40	58	Promoted to Serie B
2	Juniorcasale	38	17	16	5	51	28	+23	50	Admitted to Serie C1
3	Mantova	38	15	16	7	39	28	+11	46	Admitted to Serie C1
4	Piacenza	38	16	14	8	39	29	+10	46	Admitted to Serie C1
5	Novara	48	13	16	19	50	40	+10	42	Admitted to Serie C1
6	Treviso	38	14	13	11	42	34	+8	41	Admitted to Serie C1
7	Triestina	38	12	16	10	37	38	−1	40	Admitted to Serie C1
8	Trento	38	14	11	13	37	31	+6	39	Admitted to Serie C1
9	Lecco	38	14	11	13	38	36	+2	39	Admitted to Serie C1
10	Biellese	38	11	17	10	39	47	−8	39	Admitted to Serie C1
11	Alessandria	38	10	17	11	32	30	+2	37	Admitted to Serie C1
12	Padova	38	12	13	13	36	37	−1	37	Admitted to Serie C1
13	Pro Vercelli	38	10	16	12	31	32	−1	36	Relegated to Serie C2
14	Pergocrema	38	10	16	12	33	39	−6	36	Relegated to Serie C2
15	Sant'Angelo	38	8	17	13	34	38	−4	33	Relegated to Serie C2
16	Bolzano	38	9	14	15	34	40	−6	32	Relegated to Serie C2
17	Omegna	38	7	18	13	32	45	−13	32	Relegated to Serie C2
18	Pro Patria	38	5	19	14	18	31	−13	29	Relegated to Serie C2
19	Audace	38	7	13	18	33	56	−23	27	Relegated to Serie C2
20	Seregno	38	5	11	22	18	54	−36	21	Relegated to Serie C2

== Girone B ==
Pos	Team	Pld	W	D	L	GF	GA	GD	Pts	Promotion or relegation
1	S.P.A.L.	38	24	10	4	69	25	+44	58	Promoted to Serie B
2	Lucchese	38	16	15	7	40	24	+16	47	Admitted to Serie C1
3	Reggiana	38	16	14	8	49	26	+23	46	Admitted to Serie C1
4	Parma	38	16	14	8	50	37	+13	46	Admitted to Serie C1
5	Pisa	38	14	14	10	35	31	+4	42	Admitted to Serie C1
6	Arezzo	38	14	13	11	41	36	+5	41	Admitted to Serie C1
7	Spezia	38	14	13	11	33	33	0	41	Admitted to Serie C1
8	Teramo	38	12	16	10	39	35	+4	40	Admitted to Serie C1
9	Forlì	38	12	14	12	47	39	+8	38	Admitted to Serie C1
10	Empoli	38	14	10	14	39	35	+4	38	Admitted to Serie C1
11	Livorno	38	12	14	12	31	29	+2	38	Admitted to Serie C1
12	Chieti	38	11	16	11	30	29	+1	38	Admitted to Serie C1
13	Siena	38	10	16	12	32	35	−3	36	Relegated to Serie C2
14	Giulianova	38	9	14	15	34	46	−12	32	Relegated to Serie C2
15	Fano	38	11	10	17	29	42	−13	32	Relegated to Serie C2
16	Riccione	38	9	13	16	25	31	−6	31	Relegated to Serie C2
17	Prato	38	8	15	15	25	33	−8	31	Relegated to Serie C2
18	Grosseto	38	7	16	15	23	46	−23	30	Relegated to Serie C2
19	Massese	38	6	17	15	27	44	−17	29	Relegated to Serie C2
20	Olbia	38	6	14	18	25	67	−42	26	Relegated to Serie C2

== Girone C ==
Pos	Team	Pld	W	D	L	GF	GA	GD	Pts	Promotion or relegation
1	Nocerina	38	17	18	3	36	13	+23	52	Promoted to Serie B (Note: Promoted after play-off match in Catanzaro: Catania-Nocerina 1-2)
2	Catania	38	19	14	5	37	16	+21	52	Admitted to Serie C1
3	Reggina	38	15	17	6	39	23	+16	47	Admitted to Serie C1
4	Benevento	38	16	14	8	37	19	+18	46	Admitted to Serie C1
5	Latina	38	15	13	10	36	29	+7	43	Admitted to Serie C1
6	Salernitana	38	14	13	11	50	38	+12	41	Admitted to Serie C1
7	Campobasso	38	13	14	11	29	29	0	40	Admitted to Serie C1
8	Barletta	38	13	14	11	35	38	−3	40	Admitted to Serie C1
9	Matera	38	12	15	11	35	28	+7	39	Admitted to Serie C1
10	Paganese	38	11	17	10	28	26	+2	39	Admitted to Serie C1
11	Turris	38	15	9	14	40	41	−1	39	Admitted to Serie C1
12	Pro Cavese	38	9	20	9	29	25	+4	38	Admitted to Serie C1
13	Trapani	38	11	15	12	28	29	−1	37	Relegated to Serie C2
14	Sorrento	38	11	14	13	26	28	−2	36	Relegated to Serie C2
15	Siracusa	38	9	16	13	22	27	−5	34	Relegated to Serie C2
16	Marsala	38	10	11	17	27	43	−16	31	Relegated to Serie C2
17	Ragusa	38	7	15	16	21	41	−20	29	Relegated to Serie C2
18	Pro Vasto	38	7	13	18	23	44	−21	27	Relegated to Serie C2
19	Crotone	38	3	20	15	28	53	−25	25 (Note: 1 point deducted)	Relegated to Serie C2
20	Brindisi	38	7	10	21	38	54	−16	24	Relegated to Serie C2

== References and sources ==
- Almanacco Illustrato del Calcio – La Storia 1898–2004, Panini Edizioni, Modena, September 2005
