= 1954–55 Serie A =

52nd season of top-tier Italian football

Serie A
- Season: 1954–55
- Champions: AC Milan; 5th title
- Relegated: Udinese; Catania
- European Cup: AC Milan
- Matches: 306
- Goals: 832 (2.72 per match)
- Top goalscorer: Gunnar Nordahl (27 goals)

The 1954-55 Serie A was the fifty-third edition of the Italian Football Championship. It was the twenty-second Italian Football Championship branded Serie A, since Serie A was launched in 1929. This was the twenty-ninth season from which the Italian Football Champions adorned their team jerseys in the subsequent season with a Scudetto. AC Milan were champions for the second of four wins that decade, and for the fifth time in their history. This was their second scudetto since the scudetto started being awarded in 1924, and their second win contested as Serie A.

== Teams ==
Catania and Pro Patria had been promoted from Serie B.

On February 13, 1955 Inter Milan, Juventus, Roma and Milan all lost on the same match day, a feat that would not be repeated until September 18, 2022.

Serie A 1954-55 team distribution

== Final classification ==
Pos	Team	Pld	W	D	L	GF	GA	GD	Pts	Qualification or relegation
1	Milan (C)	34	19	10	5	81	35	+46	48	Qualification for the European Cup and for the Latin Cup
2	Udinese (D, R)	34	16	12	6	58	42	+16	44	Relegation to Serie B (Note: Catania and Udinese were relegated to Serie B by the FIGC for a corruption case. Pro Patria and SPAL maintained their places in Serie A.)
3	Roma	34	13	15	6	53	39	+14	41	
4	Bologna	34	15	10	9	56	47	+9	40	
5	Fiorentina	34	14	11	9	49	48	+1	39	
6	Napoli	34	13	12	9	50	40	+10	38	
7	Juventus	34	12	13	9	60	53	+7	37	
8	Internazionale	34	13	10	11	55	49	+6	36	
9	Sampdoria	34	11	12	11	54	44	+10	34	
9	Torino	34	12	10	12	42	45	−3	34	
11	Genoa	34	9	13	12	34	44	−10	31	
12	Catania (D, R)	34	10	10	14	38	47	−9	30	Relegation to Serie B
12	Lazio	34	11	8	15	41	52	−11	30	
12	Triestina	34	9	12	13	34	52	−18	30	
15	Atalanta	34	8	12	14	35	38	−3	28	
15	Novara	34	10	8	16	39	53	−14	28	
17	SPAL	34	5	13	16	24	49	−25	23	
18	Pro Patria	34	6	9	19	29	55	−26	21	

Source: Panini
(C) Champions; (D) Disqualified; (R) Relegated
Notes:

Milan also joined the 1955 Latin Cup.

== Results ==
Home \ Away	ATA	BOL	CTN	FIO	GEN	INT	JUV	LAZ	MIL	NAP	NOV	PPA	ROM	SAM	SPA	TOR	TRI	UDI
Atalanta		0–1	4–0	5–1	0–2	1–1	2–1	3–2	1–1	1–1	4–0	1–2	1–1	1–1	0–0	2–0	0–0	0–2
Bologna	0–0		4–2	0–2	2–1	3–2	2–1	2–1	1–2	1–3	2–2	5–0	1–3	3–1	2–0	4–1	1–1	2–4
Catania	1–0	2–2		0–1	2–0	1–1	2–2	1–0	1–3	1–1	0–0	2–1	2–2	2–1	1–0	2–1	2–1	5–0
Fiorentina	2–1	0–2	2–1		2–2	3–3	0–0	0–1	0–2	0–0	1–0	1–0	1–1	1–0	1–0	2–2	4–1	3–1
Genoa	1–0	1–2	0–0	0–0		2–0	2–0	2–0	0–8	1–1	0–0	1–3	1–0	1–1	1–1	2–0	0–0	1–1
Internazionale	3–0	2–2	3–0	3–5	0–1		1–2	2–1	1–1	1–4	3–0	2–0	1–2	1–0	1–0	1–1	4–1	2–2
Juventus	0–0	5–1	1–1	4–1	2–1	3–2		4–2	3–4	1–1	2–1	4–2	1–1	2–2	3–1	3–0	1–2	1–1
Lazio	1–0	0–0	1–0	2–1	2–1	3–2	2–1		2–4	2–1	1–1	2–0	1–1	1–3	0–0	0–2	1–1	0–2
Milan	3–1	0–0	2–0	4–0	2–2	1–1	3–1	3–0		1–1	3–0	2–0	0–2	1–3	6–0	4–1	4–0	2–2
Napoli	1–0	1–1	2–0	1–1	3–1	1–2	1–1	3–2	0–2		1–2	2–1	2–0	2–2	2–1	0–2	4–0	3–1
Novara	0–1	1–0	2–0	1–0	3–1	2–4	2–2	2–1	1–1	2–1		0–1	1–2	1–0	2–0	0–1	2–0	3–3
Pro Patria	1–2	0–2	2–1	1–1	0–2	0–1	1–2	2–0	1–1	0–2	0–0		1–1	1–0	1–1	1–2	0–2	2–2
Roma	0–0	3–4	3–1	3–4	2–1	3–0	1–1	1–3	2–1	0–0	5–3	1–1		1–1	1–0	1–0	2–0	1–1
Sampdoria	2–1	2–0	1–1	3–3	2–2	1–1	5–1	0–0	0–3	5–2	6–2	3–0	1–1		1–0	1–1	2–0	2–0
SPAL	0–0	1–1	1–3	1–3	1–0	2–0	0–0	2–2	0–0	1–1	2–1	1–1	2–5	2–0		1–1	1–0	1–4
Torino	1–1	1–2	1–0	0–1	0–0	1–1	2–2	3–1	1–2	1–0	3–2	3–1	1–1	1–0	1–0		5–1	1–1
Triestina	3–1	0–0	1–1	1–1	1–1	0–1	4–2	1–3	4–3	0–2	1–0	1–0	0–0	3–1	1–1	2–1		0–0
Udinese	3–1	2–1	1–0	2–1	3–0	0–2	0–1	1–1	3–2	3–0	1–0	2–2	1–0	2–1	3–0	3–0	1–1	

Source: Almanacco Illustrato del Calcio - La Storia 1898-2004, Panini Edizioni, Modena, September 2005 (in Italian)
Legend: Blue = home team win; Yellow = draw; Red = away team win.

== Top goalscorers ==
Rank	Player	Club	Goals
1	(Sweden) Gunnar Nordahl	Milan	27
2	(Italy) Lorenzo Bettini	Udinese	20
3	(Italy) Gino Pivatelli	Bologna	16
3	(Denmark) Poul Aage Rasmussen	Atalanta	16
5	(Italy) Giancarlo Bacci	Torino	15
5	(Italy) Giuseppe Virgili	Fiorentina	15
5	(Denmark) John Hansen	Lazio	15
5	(Uruguay) (Italy) Juan Alberto Schiaffino	Milan	15
9	(Italy) Gino Armano	Internazionale	14
9	(Sweden) Arne Selmosson	Udinese	14
11	(Denmark) Jørgen Leschly Sørensen	Milan	13
12	(Italy) Vittorio Ghiandi	Catania	12
12	(Italy) Carlo Galli	Roma	12
12	(Italy) Benito Lorenzi	Internazionale	12
15	(Paraguay) Dionisio Arce	Novara	11
15	(Denmark) Helge Bronée	Juventus	11
15	(Hungarian People's Republic) István Nyers	Roma	11
15	(Italy) Sergio Brighenti	Internazionale	11

== References and sources ==
- Almanacco Illustrato del Calcio - La Storia 1898-2004, Panini Edizioni, Modena, September 2005
