= Nafl (disambiguation) =

A nafl prayer is an optional Muslim salah.

Nafl or Nafila may also refer to:

- Fajr nafl prayer, a surerogatory prayer before Fajr prayer
- Rasm Al-Nafl, a village in Syria

== See also ==
- NAFL (disambiguation)
