= 1978–79 Serie C1 =

The Serie C1 1978–1979 was the first edition of the rebranded of major competition of the present-day Lega Pro.

== History ==
Before 1978, the Italian intermediate football league was inter-regional and semi-professional, and it was composed by two championships of three and nine groups. That year, the FIGC decided to clarify the situation opting the redistribute those 12 groups in two professional championships of two and four groups each, and an amatorial tournament of six groups.

The Serie C1 was simply divided between Northern Italy and the rest of the country. Each group had two promotions and four relegations.

=== Group A ===
Northern Italy

	Classifica	Pt
1.	COMO	50
2.	PARMA	44
3.	Triestina	44
4.	Reggiana	41
5.	Piacenza	36
6.	Novara	34
7.	Biellese	33
7.	Juniorcasale	33
9.	Cremonese	32
10.	Alessandria	31
10.	Treviso	31
10.	Lecco	31
13.	Mantova	30
13.	Forlì	30
15.	Trento	28
16.	Padova	27
17.	Spezia	26
18.	Modena	25

=== Group B ===
Southern Italy

	Classifica	Pt
1.	MATERA	44
1.	PISA	44
3.	Catania	42
4.	Campobasso	38
5.	Reggina	37
6.	Salernitana	35
7.	Benevento	34
7.	Pro Cavese	34
9.	Livorno	32
9.	Empoli	32
9.	Arezzo	32
9.	Chieti	32
9.	Teramo	32
14.	Turris	31
15.	Barletta	31
16.	Latina	30
17.	Lucchese	27
18.	Paganese	25

== References and sources ==
- Almanacco Illustrato del Calcio – La Storia 1898–2004, Panini Edizioni, Modena, September 2005

Specific
