= Udinese Channel =

Italian television channel dedicated to Udinese Calcio

Ownership
- Owner: Udinese

History
- Launched: 2011

Udinese Channel is a subscription-based channel, entirely dedicated to the Italian football team Udinese. The channel offers Udinese fans exclusive interviews with players and staff, full matches, including replays of all Serie A, Coppa Italia and UEFA Cup games, in addition to vintage matches, footballing news and other themed programming.

== Staff ==
- Francesco Pezzella
- Chiara Perale
- Gabriele Schiavi
- Maurizio Ferrari
- Luca Brivio
- Giulia Borletto
- Valerio Canetti
- Michele Criscitiello

== Regular or semi-regular guests ==
- Bruno Pizzul
- Ivan Zazzaroni
- Giancarlo Padovan
- Malu Mpasinkatu
- Riccardo Guffanti
- Massimiliano Caniato
- Xavier Jacobelli

== Programming ==
- Udinese Network
- Rassegna stampa
- Buongiorno Friuli
- Udinese news
- Udinese tonight
- A tu per tu con ...
- Udinese time
- Orizzonti bianconeri
- TG 6 minuti
- Sintesi campionato
- Diario della settimana
- Lo sai che?
- Speciale vecchie glorie bianconere
- Speciale Watford
- Speciale Granada

== Coverage Map ==

- 110 Friuli-Venezia Giulia
- 195 Veneto

== Multiplex ==
LCN	Name	Note
10	Telequattro	FTA
18	Rete Veneta	FTA
110	Udinese Channel	FTA
210	Telequattro +	FTA
601	Udinese Channel +	FTA

== See also ==
- Udinese Calcio
- Udine
