= 1924–25 Seconda Divisione =

Italian football league season

Seconda Divisione
- Season: 1924–25
- Champions: Udinese; 1st title
- Promoted: Udinese; Parma FC
- Relegated: Molassana; Esperia; Borgo S.Donnino (bankrupt); Virtus Bologna (bankruptcy)

Seconda Divisione 1924–25 was the lower championship of the Lega Nord.

Different from the higher championship, it was structured into four local groups.

== Regulations ==
It had four groups of ten clubs, with eighteen match days; however, the finals possessed four clubs and six match days.

Two of the participating teams were promoted to the First Division and the other two to test-matches.

There was one relegation in each group and a relegation tiebreaker for the penultimate teams.

== Scandals ==
Following an early match-fixing scandal, Virtus Bologna was found guilty and Mantua received a wild card for First Division.

== Group A ==
- Novese 26
- Valenzana 25
- Rivarolese 25
- Speranza 22
- Sestrese 18
- Savona 15
- Astigiani 13
- Vercellesi Erranti 13
- Vado 12
- Molassana 11

Molassana relegated.

== Group B ==
- Como 26
- Pro Patria 21
- Biellese 20
- US Milanese 19
- Juve Italia 17
- Monza 17
- Lecco 16
- Atalanta 16
- Trevigliese 16
- Esperia 12

Esperia relegated.

== Group C ==
- Parma 25
- Piacenza 12
- Carpi 16
- Libertas 16
- Pistoiese 16
- Fanfulla 14
- Viareggio 14
- Lucchese 12
- Borgo San Donnino 9
- Virtus Bologna (disqualified)

Virtus Bologna relegated; however, it soon went bankrupt. Borgo San Donnino lost a tie-breaker and soon went bankrupt.

== Group D ==
- Udinese 23
- Olympia Fiume 21
- Venezia 19
- Monfalcone 18
- Gloria Fiume 17
- Dolo 16
- Triestina 14
- Petrarca 10
- Vicenza 6 (-13)

Vicenza was identified as guilty and began a trial against the FIGC; an agreement concerning the re-election of Vicenza was produced.

== Final group ==
- Udinese 7
- Parma 7
- Novese 6
- Como 4

Udinese and Parma were promoted.
