= Midland Football League (disambiguation) =

The Midland Football League is a currently-active association football league in England, founded in 2014.

Midland Football League may refer to:

- Midland Football League (1889), former association football league in England (1889–1982)
- Midland Football League (1994), former association football league in England (1994–2005)
- Midland Football League (Scotland), former association football league in Scotland (1891–1911)
- Midlands Football League, association football league in Scotland, formed in 2021 by the East Region of the Scottish Junior Football Association
