= Northern Football League (disambiguation) =

The Northern Football League is an association football league in England.

Northern Football League may also refer to:

- Northern Football League (Scotland) – defunct association football league in Scotland
- Northern Football League (Australia) – an Australian rules football league
- Northern League (Italy) – defunct association football league in Italy

== See also ==
- NFL (disambiguation)
- Northern League (disambiguation)
