= Rasm Al-Nafl =

- Location within Syria
- Coordinates: 35.88386°N 37.58217°E
- Country: Syria
- Governate: Aleppo Governorate
- District: As-Safira District

Population (2004)
  - Total: 1,601
- Time zone: UTC+2 (EET)

Rasm Al-Nafl (Arabic: رسم النفل) is a Syrian village located in the countryside of Aleppo city, Aleppo Governorate, As-Safira District.

According to the 2004 Syrian Census the population of the village was 1,601.

Pro-rebel activists, during the Syrian Civil War, claimed that 208 civilians were killed in Rasm Al-Nafl village, they accused the Syrian government, Lebanese Hezbollah and Liwa Abu al-Fadhal al-Abbas who allegedly broke into the village on 22 June 2013.
