= NFL (disambiguation) =

The NFL (National Football League) is a professional American football league in the United States.

NFL may also refer to:

== Football leagues ==
- National Football League (India), the former top league for Indian association football
- National Football League (Ireland), a Gaelic football league organized by the GAA in Ireland
- National Football League (South Africa), a South African football league organised for whites-only during the apartheid era
- Singapore Football League formerly named Singapore National Football League, an amateur competition for clubs that are affiliated with the Football Association of Singapore

== Places ==
- Newfoundland and Labrador, a province of Canada on the country's Atlantic coast in northeastern North America
- Northfleet railway station, Kent, England (National Rail station code)
- "North Florida", also known as First Coast

== Businesses and organizations ==
- The Amtrak code for the Niagara Falls, New York (Amtrak station)
- National Fertilizers Limited, an Indian chemical company
- National Forensic League, a non-profit speech and debate association now known as the National Speech and Debate Association.
- National Front for Liberation, an armed Syrian rebel coalition
- Negro Fellowship League, historical black settlement house in Chicago
- Nisei Farmers League, an agricultural trade association in California
- Northumberland Ferries Limited, a ferry company operating in eastern Canada

== Science and technology ==
- Neurofilament light polypeptide, a biomarker that reflects axonal damage
- No free lunch, short-hand phrase for the principle that what appears to be a generous offer may have hidden costs
- No Free Lunch as used in the no free lunch in search and optimization
- Not Foot Launchable - the name of a Pterodactyl Ascender aircraft design
- The no free lunch theorem, a mathematical folklore

== Arts and entertainment ==
- Efilnikufesin (N.F.L.), a song by American metal band Anthrax
- NFL (video game), a 1989 football video game for the NES
- NFL (video game series), a football series started in 2008

== Other ==
- ISO code for Äiwoo language, of the Solomon Islands

== See also ==
- National Football League (disambiguation)
- Northern Football League (disambiguation)
