= Udinese Calcio =

Italian football club

Udinese
- Full name: Udinese Calcio S.p.A.
- Nicknames: I Bianconeri (The White and Blacks); I Friulani (The Friulians); Le Zebrette (The Little Zebras)
- Founded: 30 November 1896; 129 years ago; as Società Udinese di Ginnastica e Scherma.; 5 July 1911; 115 years ago; as Associazione del Calcio Udine; 1919; 107 years ago; as Associazione Sportiva Udinese; 1925; 101 years ago; as Associazione Calcio Udinese; 1978; 48 years ago; as Udinese Calcio
- Stadium: Bluenergy Stadium - Stadio Friuli
- Capacity: 25,132
- Owner: Gesapar Holding S.A.
- President: Franco Soldati
- Head coach: Paolo Zanetti
- League: Serie A
- 2025–26: Serie A, 10th of 20
- Website: www.udinese.it
| Home colours | Away colours | Third colours |

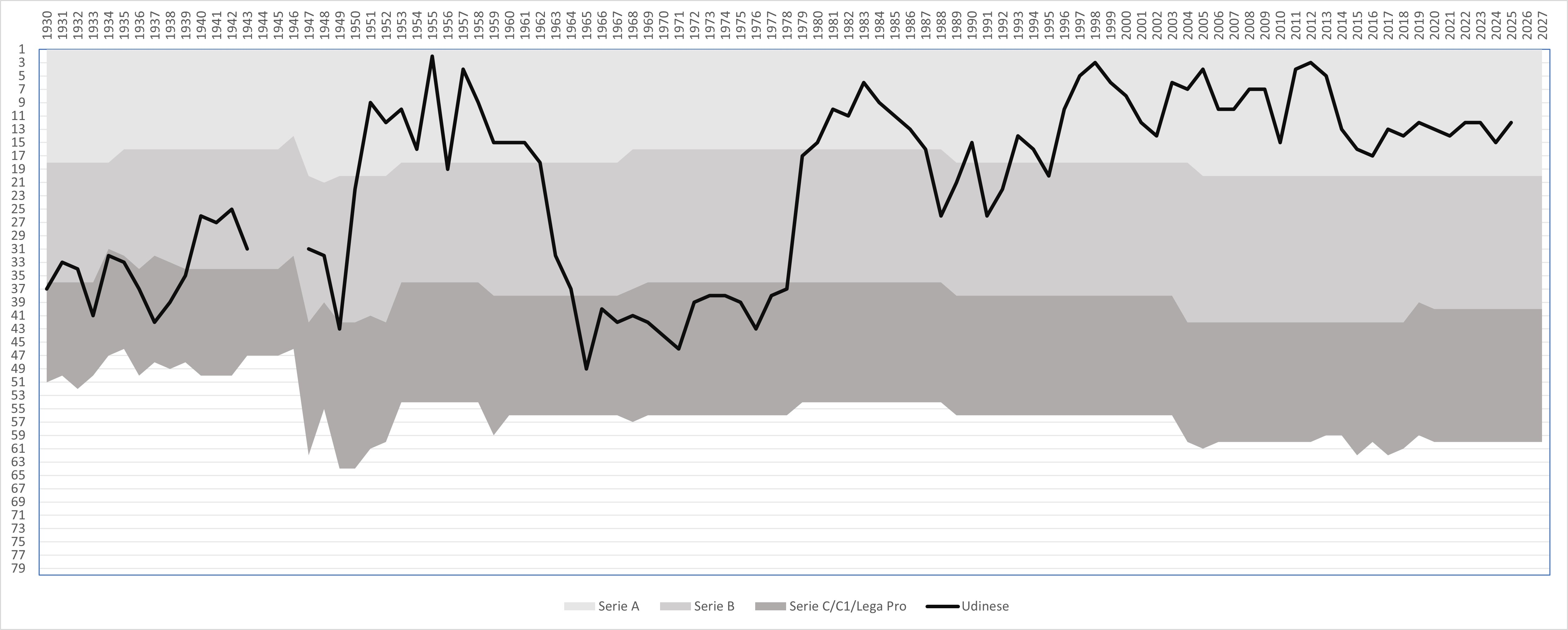
The performance of Udinese in the Italian football league structure since the first season of a unified Serie A (1929/30).

Udinese Calcio (Italian pronunciation: [udiˈneːze ˈkaltʃo, -eːse -]; "Udinese Football") is a professional football club based in Udine, Friuli-Venezia Giulia, Italy. The team currently competes in Serie A, the first tier of Italian football. It was founded on 30 November 1896 as a sports club, and on 5 July 1911 as a football club.

Traditionally, the team's home kit consists of a black and white striped shirt, black shorts, and white socks. The club broadcasts on channel 110 (Udinese Channel) on digital terrestrial television in the north-east of Italy. It has many fans in Friuli and the surrounding areas.

== History ==
=== Foundation and early years ===
Udinese was established in 1896 as part of the Società Udinese di Ginnastica e Scherma, (Udinese Society of Gymnastics and Fencing). In its inaugural year, the club won the Torneo FNGI in Treviso beating Ferrara 2–0; however, this title is not recognised as official.

On 5 July 1911, some gymnasts of Udinese, headed by Luigi Dal Dan, founded the A.C. Udinese, which joined the FIGC. The new side made its debut in a friendly match against Juventus, and won 6–0.

It was only in 1912–13 that Udinese first took part in an official FIGC championship. In that year they enrolled in the Campionato Veneto di Promozione, which consisted of just three teams (the others were Petrarca and Padova). With two victories against Padova (3–1 and 5–0), Udinese finished the tournament in second place behind Petrarca and were promoted to first-level Prima Categoria. In Prima Categoria, Udinese failed to reach the national stage, always knocked out in the Eliminatoria Veneta.

=== 1920s: Coppa Italia final ===
The 1920–21 season, which ended with the Friulani eliminated in the Eliminatoria Veneta, was memorable because it was the debut of Gino Bellotto, who is still the player who has played the most seasons with Udinese, spending 17 seasons with the Zebrette.

In 1922, Udinese, taking advantage of the absence of big clubs, entered the FIGC Italian Football Championship and reached the Coppa Italia final losing 1–0 against Vado, thanks to an overtime goal.

In the league, Udinese finished second in Girone Eliminatorio Veneto, which allowed them to remain in the top flight for the next season, despite a reform of the championships that reduced the number of teams in the competition.

The 1922–23 season was a disastrous one for Udinese, as they came last in and were relegated to the second division. The team risked failure for debts in 1923. On 24 August 1923, AS Udinese separated from AC Udinese Friuli, and the club was forced to set up a budget and an autonomous board. All debts were paid by President Alessandro Del Torso through the sale of some of his paintings and Udinese could thus join the Second Division in which they came fourth.

The 1924–25 season was memorable. The team was included in Group F II Division. The championship was very even and at the end of the tournament three teams were in contention to win: Udinese, Vicenza and Olympia River. Playoffs were needed to determine who would reach the final round.

Udinese beat Olympia in a playoff 1–0 and drew 1–1 with Vicenza. In the play-off standings, Udinese and Vicenza were still in the lead with 3 points each. Another play-off was then played to determine the winner. After a first encounter finished 0–0, Udinese lost a replay 2–1 but were awarded the win as Vicenza fielded an ineligible player, a Hungarian called Horwart. Udinese reached the finals in place of Vicenza.

In the final round, Udinese finished first and was promoted, alongside Parma, to First Division. In the following season, Udinese finished 10th and was relegated again. However, the format of the championship was again reformed and Udinese had another chance to reclaim their place in the top flight. They competed in play-offs with seven other sides for the right to play in Serie A. The winner would remain in the top flight. The club, however, lost the playoff against Legnano and lost their place in the top flight.

They remained in Second Division until the end of the 1928–29 season when Serie A and Serie B were created, with Udinese falling into the third tier (Terza Serie). The first season in Terza Serie was a triumphant one and Udinese were promoted up to Serie B.

=== 1930s and 1940s ===
The stay in Serie B lasted only two years, and after the 1931–32 season, the team returned to the third division. Udinese remained in the third tier (later renamed Serie C in 1935) until 1938–39, when coming second in Girone Finale Nord di Serie C, they were promoted to Serie B.

The Zebrette remained in Serie B for a dozen years, with average performances and were relegated to Serie C at the end of the 1947–48 season due to a reform of the championships. This relegation, however, was followed by two consecutive promotions, and thanks to an excellent second-place finish in the Serie B 1949-50, the Friulani won a historic promotion to Serie A.

=== 1950s: second place in A, and relegation back to B ===
Udinese remained in Serie A for five seasons and almost claimed an historic Scudetto in the 1954–55 season, when they came second only behind Milan. It was after that season, however, that Udinese was relegated because of an offence committed on 31 May 1953, the last day of the championship, which was exposed two years later. The Friuliani returned to Serie A after one season in B and in the following season was confirmed among the best Italian teams with an excellent fourth-place finish.

=== 1960s and 1970s ===
A decline followed those good seasons, however, with Udinese first relegated back down to Serie B in 1961–62 and then to Serie C in 1963–64. Udinese remained in C for about fifteen years, missing promotion back to B on numerous occasions. It was only after the 1977–78 season that the Friuliani, led by manager Massimo Giacomini, returned to B winning Girone A. In the same season, they won the Coppa Italia Semiprofessionisti, beating Reggina and also won the Anglo-Italian Cup.

=== 1980s: Mitropa Cup and the scandal of 1986 ===
During the next season, Udinese with Massimo Giacomini as their manager, won Serie B and returned after more than two decades to Serie A. In their first year back after so long, the team survived after a disappointing 15th-place finish. In Europe, they fared much better, winning the Mitropa Cup, a European Cup for teams that had won the previous season of Serie B.

In subsequent seasons the team managed to survive relegation without any particular difficulty also managing an impressive sixth place in 1982–83. At that time Udinese had on its books one of the club's all-time greatest players, the Brazilian midfielder Zico.

At the end of the 1985–86 season, the team was embroiled in a betting scandal and was penalised nine points for the 1986–87 season. Despite a desperate comeback towards the end of the season, Udinese were relegated to Serie B. Had they not been deducted points, Udinese would have survived.

=== 1990s and early 2000s: Europe ===
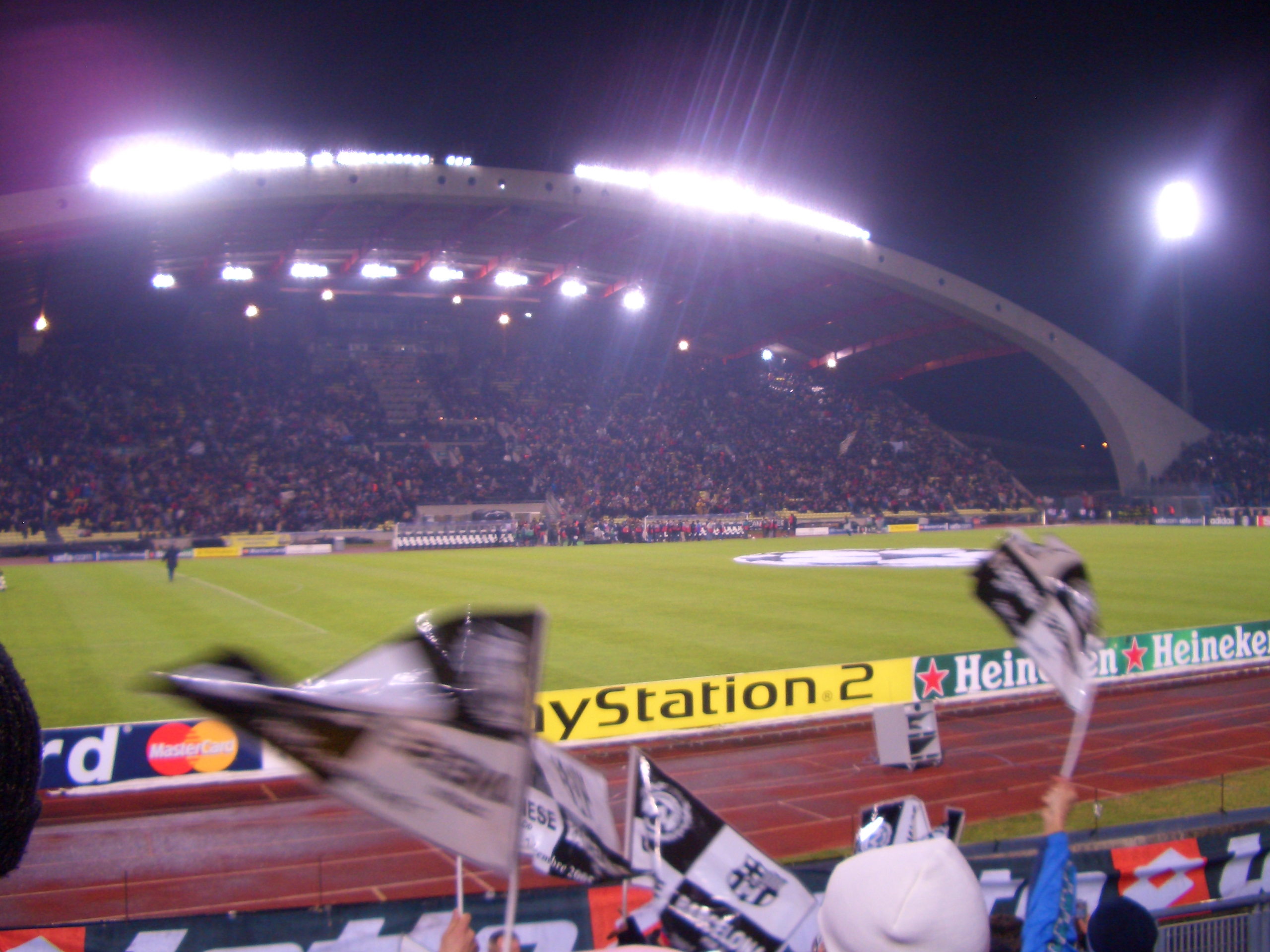
Dacia Arena before a Champions League match

During the following years, Udinese were promoted to Serie A and relegated back to B on several occasions. This situation lasted until the 1995–96 season, from which point on, they established themselves in Serie A.

The 1996–97 season saw Udinese qualify for the UEFA Cup, with Alberto Zaccheroni as manager. The following season, they managed a third-place finish behind Juventus and Internazionale, largely thanks to Oliver Bierhoff's 27 goals.

In March 2001, Luciano Spalletti was appointed manager, replacing Luigi De Canio. Spalletti managed to lead the team to survival on the penultimate matchday. Following brief periods with Roy Hodgson and Giampiero Ventura on the bench, Spalletti was again appointed manager of Udinese at the beginning of the 2002–03 season, finding an organised and ambitious club which again reached the UEFA Cup, playing attacking and entertaining football.

The surprising fourth-place finish at the end of the 2004–05 season saw Udinese achieve their first qualification for the UEFA Champions League in the history of the club. At the end of that same season, Spalletti announced his intention to leave Udinese.

The following season, Udinese played in the Champions League preliminary round, beating Sporting CP 4–2 on aggregate. Udinese were drawn in a tough group alongside Panathinaikos, Werder Bremen and Barcelona.

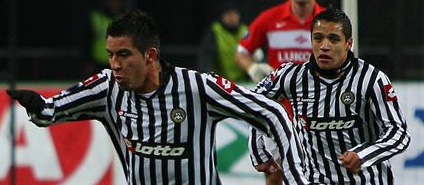
Mauricio Isla (left) and Alexis Sánchez (right) playing for Udinese in the UEFA Cup

Despite a 3–0 win over Panathinaikos in their first match, courtesy of a Vincenzo Iaquinta hat trick, the team failed to qualify for the knockout rounds, coming in third in their group, equal on points with second placed Werder and behind eventual champions Barcelona.

=== Recent history ===
After a year in the Champions League, Udinese finished tenth and returned once more to mid-table mediocrity. The turning point occurred during the summer of 2007, when the club announced the appointment of Sicilian manager Pasquale Marino and also made various quality purchases including Fabio Quagliarella and Gökhan Inler.

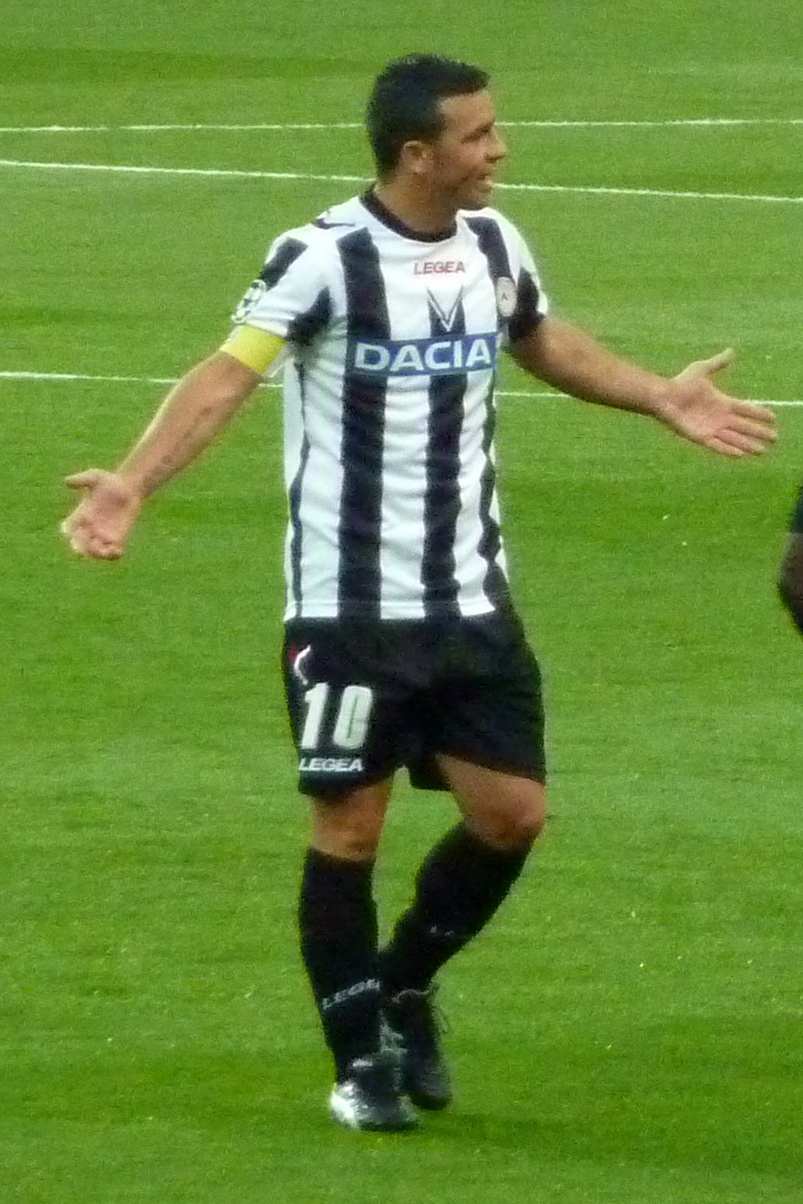
Striker Antonio Di Natale was the club's captain from 2007 until his retirement in 2016.

The 2007–08 season started well with a draw at home against champions Internazionale, but the enthusiasm was quickly erased after the first home match which finished in a 5–0 loss to newly promoted Napoli. After this match, Udinese's fortunes changed, starting with a victory over Juventus thanks to a late Antonio Di Natale goal. Udinese remained in contention for the fourth Champions League spot with Milan, Fiorentina, and Sampdoria until the end of the season, but ultimately finished in seventh place, qualifying for the UEFA Cup.

At the start of the 2008–09 season, during the press conference to present the new season's kit, the new official website was also presented, and the first Web TV channel dedicated to a football club called Udinese Channel was launched.

In the 2008–09 season, Udinese had a mixed bag of results in Serie A with a 3–1 win at Roma and a 2–1 win over Juventus, but ten losses against teams including Reggina, Chievo, and Torino dented their hopes of Champions League qualification. In the UEFA Cup, Udinese found themselves in a group with potential favourites Tottenham Hotspur, NEC, Spartak Moscow, and Dinamo Zagreb, but eased through the group with a convincing 2–0 win against Tottenham. They beat Lech Poznań in the next round 4–3 on aggregate, and then beat holders Zenit Saint Petersburg 2–1 on aggregate. In the quarter-final against Werder Bremen, with injuries to star players Antonio Di Natale, Samir Handanovič, and Felipe, they lost 6–4 on aggregate. Fabio Quagliarella managed eight goals in the campaign. They finished the season in seventh place, missing out on any European football the following year.

The 2009–10 season was an extremely disappointing one for players and fans alike. Even though Antonio Di Natale managed to score 29 goals in the league and finished top goalscorer, the season was spent battling against relegation. In the end, they finished in 15th, nine points and three places clear of the relegation zone. The only highlight of the campaign was reaching the semi-final of the Coppa Italia, beating Lumezzane in the round of 16, Milan in the quarter-finals, and eventually losing 2–1 to Roma on aggregate.

In the summer transfer window of 2010, Udinese sold Gaetano D'Agostino, Simone Pepe, Marco Motta, and Aleksandar Luković. They also brought in players that proved to be the key to their success in the 2010–11 Serie A; Mehdi Benatia and Pablo Armero, a central defender and wingback, respectively. After a poor start to the season, losing their first four games and drawing the fifth, Udinese went on to record their highest points total in history and finished in fourth place, again earning themselves a spot in the Champions League qualifying round. Di Natale, with 28 goals, became the first back-to-back capocannoniere since Lazio's Giuseppe Signori accomplished the feat in 1993 and 1994. A 0–0 home draw with Milan on the final matchday secured the Champions League spot for Udinese. Coach Francesco Guidolin kept his promise of "dancing like Boateng" if they qualified for the Champions League and did a little jig in the middle of the pitch. In the Coppa Italia, Udinese lost to Sampdoria in the round of 16 on penalties after the match ended 2–2.

The 2011–12 season continued in much the same fashion, even though Udinese lost three key players to larger clubs – Alexis Sánchez to Barcelona, Gökhan Inler to Napoli, and Cristián Zapata to Villarreal. In the Champions League qualifying round, Udinese were drawn against Arsenal and lost the away leg 1–0. At the Stadio Friuli, Udinese lost 2–1, 3–1 on aggregate, and entered the Europa League group stage, Antonio Di Natale missing a penalty that at the time would have taken Udinese through. Domestically, Udinese started strong but with their quality shown in defence, conceding the least of all teams after 15 games, only seven. For the second consecutive season, Udinese qualified for the Champions League, clinching third place on the final day of the season with a 2–0 away win against Catania. In the summer transfer window, key players Kwadwo Asamoah and Mauricio Isla were both sold to champions Juventus. The club failed to reach the group stage of the year's Champions League, however, losing on penalties after extra time to Portuguese club Braga. Antonio Di Natale scored 23 goals to record his third consecutive season with 20+ goals in Serie A.

Udinese started off the 2012–13 Serie A season in mixed form, with seven draws and three losses in their first thirteen games. However, starting in December the team began to pick up wins more frequently, concurrent with Di Natale finding the net on a regular basis. After a period of balancing wins with losses, the team went on a phenomenal eight game winning streak to end the season, with Luis Muriel emerging as a key player. Like the 2011–12 season, Di Natale again finished with 23 goals, becoming the first player since Gabriel Batistuta, of Fiorentina, to score 20 or more goals in four or more consecutive seasons.

Over the coming years, Udinese would go on to finish middle to lower table in Serie A. In the 2017–18 season, Udinese manager Massimo Oddo was sacked after the club lost 11 straight games. Oddo was then replaced by Igor Tudor who guided the club to safety away from the relegation places.

== Colours and symbols ==
=== Colours ===
The official colours of Udinese are white and black, the same as the municipal coat of arms, these have been present in the team's kit since its beginnings, although their use has often varied between different styles. At the end of the 19th century, the newly formed Società Udinese di Ginnastica e Scherma wore a completely black shirt, adorned only with a white five-pointed star pinned to the centre of the chest.

In the 1910s, the shirt was split vertically in half between the two colours, later, white became the dominant colour, with black relegated to decorations. Since the 1930s the typical black and white striped shirt has been almost permanently used, often accompanied by black shorts and socks, or by white shorts and black socks.

The only significant innovations came in the 1980s when the Friulian team's clothing diverged from tradition, presenting more imaginative solutions: notably, the white shirts with a black central bar used in the first part of the decade, followed by black shirts with a massive white stripe across them. From the 1990s onwards, there was a gradual return to simplicity, although experiments like "curved" stripes along the upper edge were made in the mid-2000s.

As for away uniforms, these do not follow fixed patterns except for the solid colour, with the club changing colours every year, using blue, yellow, orange, sky blue, pink, and even the same black and white as the home kit.

Kit manufacturers and sponsors

| Period | Kit manufacturers | Shirt sponsor (main) | Shirt sponsor (secondary) | Shirt sponsor (back) | Shirt sponsor (sleeve) |
|---|---|---|---|---|---|
| 1896–1979 | In-house | None | None | None | None |
| 1979–1981 | Pouchain | None | None | None | None |
| 1981–1983 | Americanino | None | None | None | None |
| 1983–1984 | Americanino | Agfacolor | None | None | None |
| 1984–1985 | Diadora | Agfacolor | None | None | None |
| 1985–1986 | Diadora | Agfa | None | None | None |
| 1986–1987 | ABM | Freud Tools | None | None | None |
| 1987–1990 | ABM | Rex Elettrodomestici | None | None | None |
| 1990–1992 | Adidas | Rex Elettrodomestici | None | None | None |
| 1992–1993 | Lotto | Gaudianello | None | None | None |
| 1993–1994 | Lotto | Victors Caramelle Balsamiche | None | None | None |
| 1994–1996 | Hummel | Albatros Idromassaggi | None | None | None |
| 1996–1997 | Hummel | Millionaire Market | None | None | None |
| 1997–1998 | Hummel | Atreyu immobiliare | None | None | None |
| 1998–2001 | Diadora | Telit | None | None | None |
| 2001–2002 | Diadora | Ristora | None | None | None |
| 2002–2003 | Le Coq Sportif | Bernardi Abbigliamento | None | None | None |
| 2003–2004 | Le Coq Sportif | Bernardi Abbigliamento (Matchday 1-17) / Postalmarket (18-34) | None | None | None |
| 2004–2005 | Le Coq Sportif | Kia | None | None | None |
| 2005–2006 | Lotto | Kia | None | None | None |
| 2006–2008 | Lotto | Gaudì Fashion | None | None | None |
| 2008–2009 | Lotto | Lotto (Matchday 1-16) / Dacia (17-38) | Il Granchio | None | None |
| 2009–2010 | Lotto | Dacia | Various | None | None |
| 2010–2011 | Legea | Dacia | Tipicamente Friulano (Home) & Lumberjack (Away) | None | None |
| 2011–2012 | Legea | Dacia | Tipicamente Friulano (Home) & Q.Bell (Away) | None | None |
| 2012–2013 | Legea | Dacia | Q.Bell | None | None |
| 2013–2014 | HS Football | Dacia | UPIM | None | None |
| 2014–2015 | HS Football | Dacia | Alcott | None | None |
| 2015–2016 | HS Football | Dacia | None | None | None |
| 2016–2017 | HS Football | Dacia | Vortice Elettrosociali | Magnadyne (Matchday 1-11, 13-20) / Bluenergy (12, 21-38) | None |
| 2017–2018 | HS Football | Dacia | Vortice Elettrosociali | Bluenergy | None |
| 2018–2020 | Macron | Dacia | Vortice Elettrosociali | Bluenergy | None |
| 2018–2020 | Macron | Dacia | Vortice Elettrosociali | Bluenergy | None |
| 2020–2021 | Macron | Dacia | Vortice Elettrosociali | Bluenergy | Prosciutto di San Daniele |
| 2021–2022 | Macron | Dacia | Kiba Inu | Bluenergy | Prosciutto di San Daniele |
| 2022–2023 | Macron | Dacia | Prestipay | Bluenergy | Prosciutto di San Daniele |
| 2023–2024 | Macron | Io sono Friuli-Venezia Giulia | Prestipay | Bluenergy | Prosciutto di San Daniele |
| 2024– | Macron | Io sono Friuli-Venezia Giulia | Banca 360 FVG | Bluenergy | Apu Apustaja |

=== Official symbols ===
Crest

Throughout its history, Udinese has used numerous crests that share the colours and heraldry of the Friulian city. In a photo taken around 1896, likely during an FGNI Tournament, the city coat of arms appears on the chest, with a white star on a black shirt. However, there is not enough information to confirm if this was used officially or continuously over the years. Indeed, in later photos from the early 20th century, no emblem appears on the shirts.

The first official emblems date back to the 1950s, 60s, and 70s, but since they were not depicted on the shirts, it is difficult to determine the exact period. All these emblems depicted a shield filled with black and white vertical stripes, first with the inscription "AC Udinese" and later with the "ACU" (Associazione Calcistica Udinese) monogram. The first emblem visible on the shirt appeared in 1979, depicting a zebra inside a green circle. The second symbol, introduced in the early 1980s under President Lamberto Mazza, featured a white shield enclosing a black chevron — the same design that represents the city of Udine — with the "Z" logo of Zanussi (the company that owned the club at the time) below it and the lowercase inscription "udinese calcio". Despite this being the official emblem, for the 1981-1982 season, the shirts displayed only the large "Z" on the chest.

The third emblem was a variation of the second one: after Zanussi's departure, following the club's acquisition by Giampaolo Pozzo, the "Z" was removed, and only the shield with the city's emblem remained. Then, between 1992 and 1995, the club introduced a circular emblem for the first time, with the city’s coat of arms in the centre, surrounded by a grey circle.

Finally, in the 1995-1996 season, the emblem currently in use made its debut: a shield surrounded by a circle, first grey, then black, and from the 2010-2011 season, grey again, with two laurel branches wrapped around it.

Fans have repeatedly requested that the Friulian eagle should be added to the black and white shirts, but the club has never accepted this request, partly due to existing regulations. In 2008, the club's decision to include the emblem of Friuli-Venezia Giulia on the shirts was strongly contested by fans, as it was perceived as the emblem of rival Trieste rather than representing only Friuli.

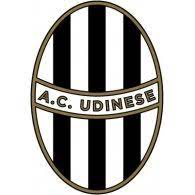
Emblem used in the 1950s

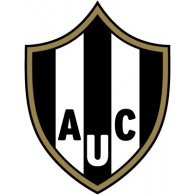
Emblem used in the 1960s

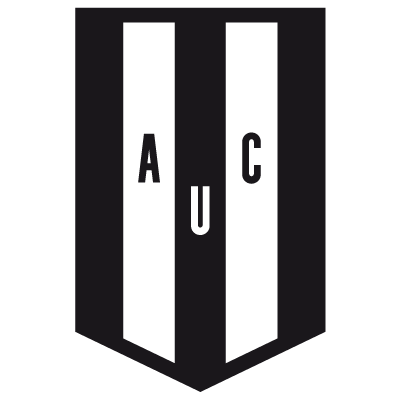
Emblem used in the 1970s

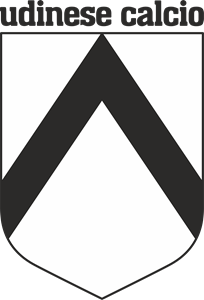
Emblem used from 1984 to 1992

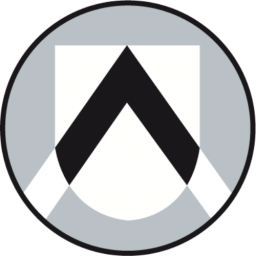
Emblem used from 1992 to 1995

Anthem

The club's official anthem is "Vinci per noi" (Win for Us), performed by singer Connie Del Colle. The song is played before every home game at the Stadio Friuli.

Previously, the anthem was "Alè Udin," performed by Dario Zampa. Its chorus became a distinctive chant of the Friulian fans.

== Honours ==
=== National ===
==== League ====
- Serie B
  - Winners (3): 1924–25, 1955–56, 1978–79
- Serie C
  - Winners (3): 1929–30, 1948–49, 1977–78

==== Cups ====
- Coppa Italia Serie C
  - Winners (1): 1977–78

=== International ===
- UEFA Intertoto Cup
  - Winners (1): 2000

=== Other Titles ===
- Anglo-Italian Cup
  - Winners (1): 1978
- Mitropa Cup
  - Winners (1): 1979–80

== Divisional movements ==
| Series | Years | Last | Promotions | Relegations |
|---|---|---|---|---|
| A | 52 | 2024–25 | - | ▼7 (1923, 1926, 1955, 1962, 1987, 1990, 1994) |
| B | 18 | 1994–95 | ▲7 (1925, 1950, 1956, 1979, 1989, 1992, 1995) | ▼4 (1928, 1932, 1948, 1964) |
| C | 23 | 1977–78 | ▲4 (1930, 1939, 1949, 1978) | never |
93 years of professional football in Italy since 1929

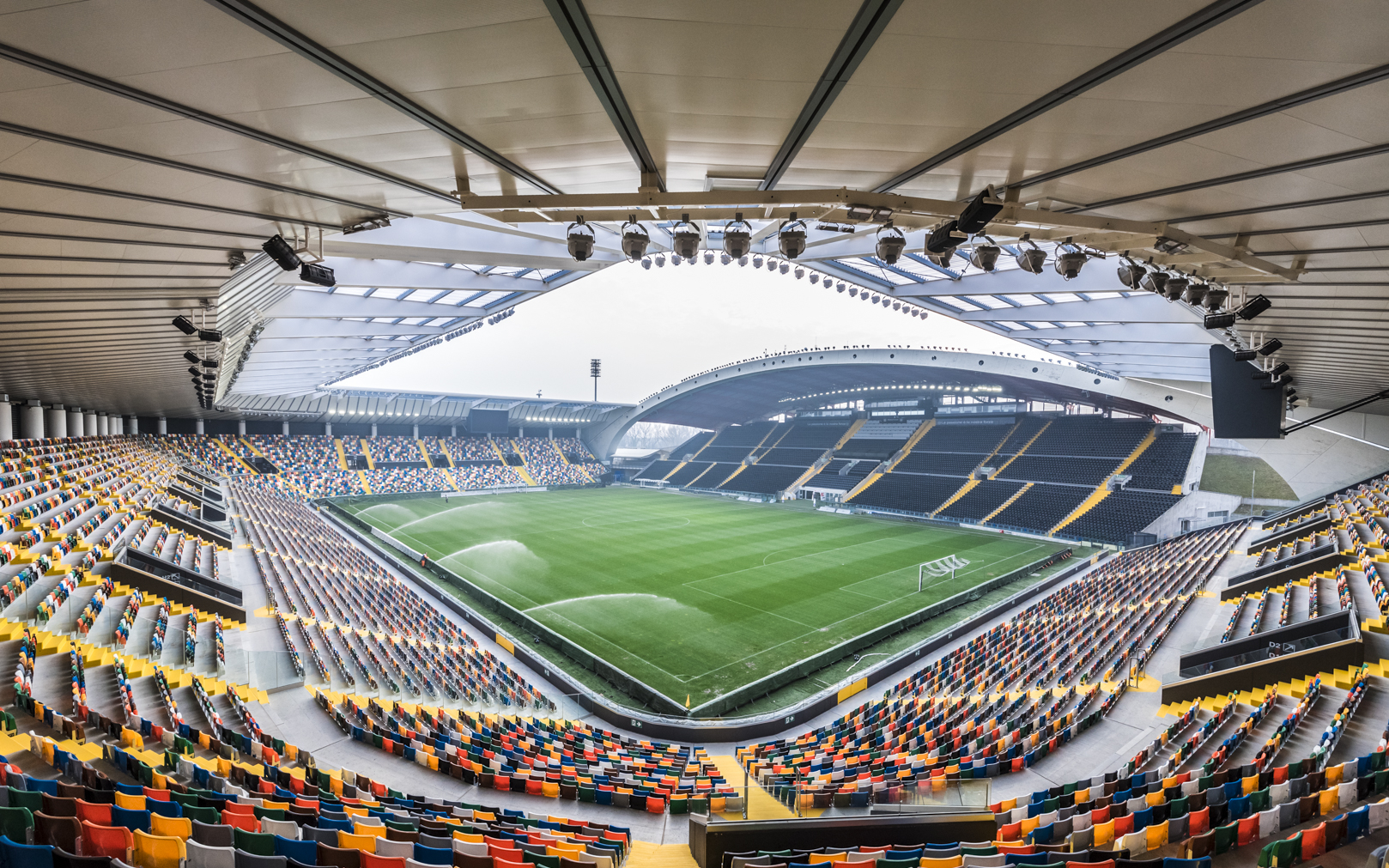
Stadio Friuli (2016)

== Stadiums ==
- Stadio Moretti (1924–76)
- Stadio Friuli (1976–Present)

== Players ==
=== Current squad ===
As of 24 September 2026

Note: Flags indicate national team as defined under FIFA eligibility rules; some limited exceptions apply. Players may hold more than one non-FIFA nationality.

| No. | Pos. | Nation | Player |
|---|---|---|---|
| 4 | MF | SLO | Sandi Lovrić |
| 5 | DF | AUT | David Alaba |
| 6 | MF | ESP | Oier Zarraga |
| 7 | FW | SEN | Idrissa Gueye |
| 8 | MF | SWE | Jesper Karlström (captain) |
| 9 | FW | ENG | Keinan Davis |
| 10 | FW | ITA | Nicolò Zaniolo |
| 11 | DF | CIV | Hassane Kamara |
| 13 | DF | ITA | Nicolò Bertola |
| 14 | DF | IRL | James Abankwah |
| 15 | FW | CIV | Vakoun Bayo |
| 16 | DF | ITA | Matteo Palma |
| 20 | DF | COL | Juan David Arizala |
| 23 | DF | KOS | Mërgim Vojvoda |

| No. | Pos. | Nation | Player |
|---|---|---|---|
| 24 | MF | POL | Jakub Piotrowski |
| 27 | DF | BEL | Christian Kabasele |
| 28 | DF | CIV | Oumar Solet |
| 30 | MF | GEO | Giorgi Chakvetadze |
| 32 | MF | NED | Jurgen Ekkelenkamp |
| 38 | MF | SCO | Lennon Miller |
| 40 | GK | NGR | Maduka Okoye |
| 41 | GK | POL | Bartosz Mrozek |
| 45 | FW | ITA | Giulio Vinciati |
| 46 | MF | ESP | Unai Gómez |
| 59 | DF | ITA | Alessandro Zanoli |
| 77 | DF | CMR | Enzo Ebosse |
| 91 | FW | SRB | Lazar Jovanović |
| 93 | GK | ITA | Daniele Padelli |

=== Out on loan ===
As of 9 September 2026

Note: Flags indicate national team as defined under FIFA eligibility rules; some limited exceptions apply. Players may hold more than one non-FIFA nationality.

| No. | Pos. | Nation | Player |
|---|---|---|---|
| — | GK | ITA | Alessandro Nunziante (at Arezzo until 30 June 2027) |
| — | DF | GEO | Saba Goglichidze (at Monza until 30 June 2027) |
| — | DF | DEN | Thomas Kristensen (at Atalanta until 30 June 2027) |
| — | DF | CRO | Branimir Mlačić (at Watford until 30 June 2027) |
| — | DF | ZIM | Jordan Zemura (at Watford until 30 June 2027) |

| No. | Pos. | Nation | Player |
|---|---|---|---|
| — | MF | FRA | Abdoulaye Camara (at Ajax until 30 June 2027) |
| — | MF | ITA | Simone Pafundi (at Catanzaro until 30 June 2027) |
| — | MF | SLO | David Pejičić (at Koper until 30 June 2027) |
| — | FW | POL | Adam Buksa (at Mallorca until 30 June 2027) |
| — | FW | CHI | Damián Pizarro (at Audax Italiano until 30 June 2027) |

== Notable players ==
The following is a provisional list of players that were capped internationally while playing for Udinese, sorted by nationality.

- (Argentina) Abel Balbo
- (Argentina) Roberto Pereyra
- (Argentina) Daniel Bertoni
- (Argentina) Nahuel Molina
- (Argentina) Rodrigo De Paul
- (Argentina) Juan Musso
- (Argentina) Mauricio Pineda
- (Argentina) Néstor Sensini
- (Argentina) Roberto Sosa
- (Belgium) Régis Genaux
- (Belgium) Johan Walem
- (Brazil) Edinho
- (Brazil) Felipe
- (Brazil) Márcio Amoroso
- (Brazil) Zico
- (Chile) Mauricio Isla
- (Chile) David Pizarro
- (Chile) Alexis Sánchez
- (Colombia) Juan Cuadrado
- (Colombia) Cristián Zapata
- (Czech Republic) Antonín Barák
- (Czech Republic) Jakub Jankto
- (Czech Republic) Marek Jankulovski
- (Denmark) Thomas Helveg
- (Denmark) Martin Jørgensen
- (Denmark) Per Krøldrup
- (Denmark) Jens Stryger Larsen
- (Denmark) Morten Bisgaard
- (Egypt) Hazem Emam
- (Germany) Oliver Bierhoff
- (Germany) Carsten Jancker
- (Ghana) Stephen Appiah
- (Ghana) Kwadwo Asamoah
- (Ghana) Asamoah Gyan
- (Ghana) Sulley Muntari
- (Ghana) Emmanuel Badu
- (Greece) Orestis Karnezis
- (Iraq) Ali Adnan
- (Italy) Valerio Bertotto
- (Italy) Alessandro Calori
- (Italy) Franco Causio
- (Italy) Morgan De Sanctis
- (Italy) Antonio Di Natale
- (Italy) Stefano Fiore
- (Italy) Giuliano Giannichedda
- (Italy) Vincenzo Iaquinta
- (Italy) Simone Pepe
- (Italy) Paolo Poggi
- (Italy) Paolo Pulici
- (Italy) Fabio Quagliarella
- (Italy) Dino Zoff
- (Ivory Coast) Seko Fofana
- (Morocco) Mehdi Benatia
- (Poland) Marek Koźmiński
- (Nigeria) Odion Ighalo
- (Portugal) Bruno Fernandes
- (Russia) Igor Shalimov
- (Serbia) Dušan Basta
- (Serbia) Željko Brkić
- (Serbia) Aleksandar Luković
- (Slovenia) Samir Handanović
- (Spain) Gerard Deulofeu
- (Spain) Ricardo Gallego
- (Sweden) Arne Selmosson
- (Switzerland) Valon Behrami
- (Switzerland) Gökhan Inler
- (Switzerland) Silvan Widmer
- (Republic of Ireland) Festy Ebosele
- (Republic of Ireland) James Abankwah
- (Socialist Federal Republic of Yugoslavia) Ivica Šurjak

== Coaching staff ==
As of 27 August 2025

| Position | Staff |
|---|---|
| Head coach | (Austria) Kosta Runjaić |
| Assistant head coach | (Poland) Przemysław Małecki |
| Technical assistant | (Poland) Alex Trukan (Italy) Matteo De Biaggio |
| Goalkeeping coach | (Italy) Sergio Marcon (Slovenia) Kris Štergulc |
| Match analyst | (Italy) Michele Guadagnino (Italy) Mattia Mosanghini |
| Head of athletic coach | (Spain) Jordi García |
| Athletic coach | (Spain) Pedro Abraham |
| Rehab coach | (Spain) Angel Aceña |
| Athletic coach and data analyst | (Italy) Francesco Tonizzo |
| Head of medical | (United States) Fabio Tenore |
| Social doctor | (Italy) Bruno Massa (Italy) Riccardo Savi |
| Head nutritionist | (Spain) Antonio Molina |
| Nutritionist | (Spain) Álvaro Romero |
| Podiatrist | (Italy) Jacopo Brandolese |
| Head of physiotherapist | (Spain) Antonio Manzanera |
| Physiotherapist | (Italy) Andrea Condolo (Italy) Francesco Fondelli (Italy) Pasquale Iuliano (Spain) Sergio Lopez (Italy) Alessio Lovisetto (Italy) Davide Massa |
| Kit manager | (Italy) Andrea Bertolo (Italy) Igor Ferino (Italy) Marco Scotto |
| General manager | (Italy) Franco Collavino |
| Group technical director | (Italy) Gianluca Nani |
| Technical area manager | (Switzerland) Gökhan Inler |
| Team manager | (Italy) Antonio Criscuolo |
| Sports secretary | (Italy) Fabio Vittori |
| Communications manager | (Italy) Jacopo Romeo |

== Key club figures ==
As of 27 August 2025

| Position | Staff |
|---|---|
| President | (Italy) Franco Soldati |
| Vice president | (Italy) Stefano Campoccia |
| Board member | (Italy) Gino Pozzo |
| Board member and general manager | (Italy) Franco Collavino |
| Head of technical area | (Switzerland) Gökhan Inler |
| Head of Administration, Finance and control | (Italy) Alberto Rigotto |
| Head of scouting | (Italy) Andrea Carnevale |
| Secretary | (Italy) Daniela Baracetti |
| Sports secretary | (Italy) Fabio Vittori |
| Team manager | (Italy) Antonio Criscuolo |
| Head of marketing | (Italy) Gianluca Pizzamiglio |
| Marketing department | Udinese Calcio S.p.A. in collaboration with Infront Italy S.p.A. |
| Head of communications and press office | (Italy) Jacopo Romeo |
| Head of youth academy | (Italy) Angelo Trevisan |

== Managerial history ==
The following is a list of Udinese managers throughout history.

| Name | Nationality | Years |
|---|---|---|
| József Ging | (Hungary) | 1920–21 |
| György Kanjaurek | (Hungary) | 1922–23 |
| Otto Krappan | (Hungary) | 1923–26 |
| Lajos Czeizler | (Hungary) | 1927–28 |
| István Fögl | (Hungary) | 1928–29 |
| Eugen Payer | (Hungary) | 1929–30 |
| Imre Payer | (Hungary) | 1930–31 |
| István Fögl | (Hungary) | 1931–32 |
| Emerich Hermann | (Hungary) | 1934–36 |
| István Fögl | (Hungary) | 1936–37 |
| Luigi Miconi | (Italy) | 1937–40 |
| Eugen Payer | (Hungary) | 1939–40 |
| Pietro Piselli | (Italy) | 1940–41 |
| Luigi Miconi | (Italy) | 1941–42 |
| Ferenc Molnár | (Hungary) | 1942–43 |
| Gino Bellotto | (Italy) | 1942–43 |
| Alfredo Foni | (Italy) | 1943–44 |
| Vittorio Faroppa | (Italy) | 1946–47 |
| Hermann Schramseis | (Austria) | 1947–48 |
| Elio Loschi | (Italy) | 1947–48 |
| Aldo Olivieri | (Italy) | 1948–50 |
| Guido Testolina | (Italy) | 1950–52 |
| Severino Feruglio | (Italy) | 1951–52 |
| Aldo Olivieri | (Italy) | 1952–53 |
| Giuseppe Bigogno | (Italy) | 1953–58 |
| Luigi Miconi | (Italy) | 1958–59 |
| Severino Feruglio | (Italy) | 1959–60 |
| Giuseppe Bigogno | (Italy) | 1960–61 |
| Luigi Bonizzoni | (Italy) | 1960–62 |

| Name | Nationality | Years |
|---|---|---|
| Sergio Manente | (Italy) | 1961–62 |
| Alfredo Foni | (Italy) | 1961–62 |
| Alberto Eliani | (Italy) | 1962–64 |
| Armando Segato | (Italy) | 1963–64 |
| Severino Feruglio | (Italy) | 1964–65 |
| Luigi Comuzzi | (Italy) | 1965–67 |
| Umberto Pinardi | (Italy) | 1967–68 |
| Luigi Comuzzi | (Italy) | 1967–68 |
| Romolo Camuffo | (Italy) | 1968–69 |
| Oscar Montez | (Argentina) | 1969–70 |
| Stefanino De Stefano | (Italy) | 1969–70 |
| Paolo Tabanelli | (Italy) | 1969–71 |
| Luigi Comuzzi | (Italy) | 1971–73 |
| Massimo Giacomini | (Italy) | 1973–74 |
| Sergio Manente | (Italy) | 1973–75 |
| Humberto Rosa | (Argentina) | 1975–76 |
| Massimo Giacomini | (Italy) | 1977–79 |
| Corrado Orrico | (Italy) | 1979–80 |
| Gustavo Giagnoni | (Italy) | 1980–81 |
| Enzo Ferrari | (Italy) | 1980–84 |
| Luís Vinício | (Brazil) | 1984–86 |
| Giancarlo De Sisti | (Italy) | 1985–87 |
| Bora Milutinović | (Socialist Federal Republic of Yugoslavia) | 1987–88 |
| Nedo Sonetti | (Italy) | 1987–89 |
| Bruno Mazzia | (Italy) | 1989–90 |
| Franco Scoglio | (Italy) | 1991–92 |
| Adriano Fedele | (Italy) | 1991–94 |
| Alberto Bigon | (Italy) | 1992–93 |
| Giovanni Galeone | (Italy) | 1994–95 |

| Name | Nationality | Years |
|---|---|---|
| Alberto Zaccheroni | (Italy) | 1995–98 |
| Francesco Guidolin | (Italy) | 1998–99 |
| Luigi De Canio | (Italy) | 1999–01 |
| Luciano Spalletti | (Italy) | 2001 |
| Roy Hodgson | (England) | 2001 |
| Giampiero Ventura | (Italy) | 2001–02 |
| Luciano Spalletti | (Italy) | 2002–05 |
| Serse Cosmi | (Italy) | 2005–06 |
| Néstor Sensini (interim) | (Argentina) | 2006 |
| Loris Dominissini | (Italy) | 2006 |
| Giovanni Galeone | (Italy) | 2006–07 |
| Alberto Malesani | (Italy) | 2007 |
| Pasquale Marino | (Italy) | 2007–09 |
| Gianni De Biasi | (Italy) | 2009–10 |
| Pasquale Marino | (Italy) | 2010 |
| Francesco Guidolin | (Italy) | 2010–14 |
| Andrea Stramaccioni | (Italy) | 2014–15 |
| Stefano Colantuono | (Italy) | 2015–16 |
| Luigi De Canio | (Italy) | 2016 |
| Giuseppe Iachini | (Italy) | 2016 |
| Luigi Delneri | (Italy) | 2016–17 |
| Massimo Oddo | (Italy) | 2017–18 |
| Igor Tudor | (Croatia) | 2018 |
| Julio Velázquez | (Spain) | 2018 |
| Davide Nicola | (Italy) | 2018–19 |
| Igor Tudor | (Croatia) | 2019 |
| Luca Gotti | (Italy) | 2019–21 |
| Gabriele Cioffi | (Italy) | 2021–2022 |
| Andrea Sottil | (Italy) | 2022–2023 |

| Name | Nationality | Years |
|---|---|---|
| Gabriele Cioffi | (Italy) | 2023–2024 |
| Fabio Cannavaro | (Italy) | 2024 |
| Kosta Runjaić | (Germany) | 2024–2026 |
| Paolo Zanetti | (Italy) | 2026– |
