= National Football League (disambiguation) =

The National Football League is the highest level of play in professional American football in the United States.

National Football League may also refer to:

== Association football ==
- National League (English football), an association football league in England and Wales
- Fotbalová národní liga or Major League Football, an association football league in the Czech Republic
- National Football League (Fiji), an association football league in Fiji
- National Association Football League (sometimes referred to as the National Football League), an association football league in the United States
- National Football League (India), an association football league in India
- Russian National Football League, former name of an association football league in Russia
- National Football League (Rwanda), an association football league in Rwanda
- Singapore National Football League
- National Football League (South Africa), a defunct association football league in South Africa

== Other football codes ==
- Australian National Football Council known as the National Football League between 1975 and 1989, a former organizational body for Australian rules football
- Ladies' National Football League, a ladies' Gaelic football league in Ireland
- National Football League (1902), a defunct American football league
- National Football League (Ireland), a Gaelic football league in Ireland

== See also ==
- Championnat National, an association football competition in France
- Liga Leumit or National League, an association football league in Israel
- National Football League Cheerleading, the cheerleading league associated with the American NFL
- NFL (disambiguation)
