= 1978–79 Serie B =

Italian football league season

Serie B
- Season: 1978–79
- Champions: Udinese; 3rd title

Serie B 1978-79 team distribution

The Serie B 1978–79 was the forty-seventh tournament of this competition played in Italy since its creation.

== Teams ==
Udinese, SPAL and Nocerina had been promoted from Serie C, while Genoa, Foggia and Pescara had been relegated from Serie A.

== Events ==
Relegations rose to four following the reform of the Serie C. The winners joined the Mitropa Cup.

== Final classification ==
Pos	Team	Pld	W	D	L	GF	GA	GD	Pts	Promotion or relegation
1	Udinese (P, C)	38	21	13	4	52	22	+30	55	Promotion to Serie A
2	Cagliari (P)	38	16	17	5	46	24	+22	49	Promotion to Serie A
3	Pescara (P)	38	16	16	6	44	27	+17	48	Serie A after tie-breaker
4	Monza	38	16	16	6	39	20	+19	48	Promotion tie-breaker
5	Pistoiese	38	15	14	9	38	28	+10	44	
6	Lecce	38	14	15	9	33	33	0	43	
7	Palermo	38	11	19	8	38	34	+4	41	
8	Brescia	38	11	17	10	41	41	0	39	
9	Sampdoria	38	9	18	11	37	39	−2	36	
10	Ternana	38	8	20	10	33	39	−6	36	
11	Sambenedettese	38	9	18	11	35	42	−7	36	
12	Genoa	38	11	13	14	34	35	−1	35	
13	Cesena	38	9	17	12	27	29	−2	35	
14	S.P.A.L.	38	9	17	12	34	37	−3	35	
15	Taranto	38	7	21	10	25	30	−5	35	
16	Bari	38	6	23	9	29	36	−7	35	
17	Foggia (R)	38	8	17	13	39	45	−6	33	Relegation to Serie C1
18	Nocerina (R)	38	8	13	17	24	39	−15	29	Relegation to Serie C1
19	Rimini (R)	38	3	18	17	17	39	−22	24	Relegation to Serie C1
20	Varese (R)	38	6	12	20	29	55	−26	24	Relegation to Serie C1

Source: Panini
(C) Champions; (P) Promoted; (R) Relegated

== Results ==
Home \ Away	BAR	BRE	CAG	CES	FOG	GEN	LEC	MON	NOC	PAL	PES	PIS	RIM	SMB	SMP	SPA	TAR	TER	UDI	VAR
Bari	—	1–0	2–2	1–1	1–1	1–0	2–2	0–0	0–0	1–0	0–0	1–1	0–0	2–0	1–0	0–0	3–3	0–0	1–2	1–0
Brescia	1–1	—	3–1	1–1	4–3	1–0	3–1	0–1	2–1	2–1	1–1	0–0	2–1	0–0	2–1	1–1	0–0	1–0	2–2	1–0
Cagliari	2–0	2–2	—	0–1	0–0	2–1	5–1	0–1	1–0	2–2	1–1	2–0	1–0	2–1	3–0	0–0	2–0	2–0	1–0	2–0
Cesena	0–0	3–1	0–0	—	2–0	0–0	0–1	0–0	1–1	1–0	0–1	1–1	1–0	0–0	0–0	1–2	1–1	2–0	1–1	1–0
Foggia	3–1	1–1	0–2	0–0	—	1–1	2–0	1–1	3–0	1–1	1–2	1–2	1–1	2–3	3–1	2–1	1–1	1–1	0–0	1–0
Genoa	0–0	0–1	1–1	4–2	1–1	—	1–1	1–0	0–0	2–3	0–0	2–0	1–0	2–0	0–1	1–0	2–1	0–1	2–1	2–0
Lecce	2–1	2–1	2–1	2–0	1–0	2–1	—	0–0	2–1	0–2	2–2	0–0	1–0	2–0	1–2	1–0	0–0	0–0	1–0	2–1
Monza	1–1	1–0	0–1	3–0	1–0	1–1	0–1	—	3–0	1–1	1–1	2–1	3–0	1–0	2–0	2–0	2–0	0–0	1–0	2–0
Nocerina	1–0	2–0	1–1	2–1	0–1	1–0	0–0	0–2	—	1–1	0–1	1–0	2–0	1–2	1–0	1–1	0–0	1–1	0–0	2–0
Palermo	1–1	0–0	0–0	1–0	2–1	1–0	0–0	2–0	1–0	—	1–1	1–0	1–0	2–2	1–1	2–1	1–1	3–1	0–1	0–1
Pescara	2–1	0–0	0–0	0–0	4–1	1–1	1–0	1–0	2–1	1–1	—	3–0	2–0	3–1	1–1	0–0	2–0	2–1	0–2	2–0
Pistoiese	3–0	1–1	1–0	1–0	2–0	1–0	1–1	1–2	1–0	2–2	2–1	—	3–1	2–0	0–0	4–0	1–0	2–0	0–1	2–1
Rimini	0–0	1–0	1–2	0–0	2–2	1–1	0–0	0–0	0–0	0–0	0–0	0–0	—	1–0	0–2	0–0	2–1	1–2	1–3	1–1
Samb.	1–1	3–2	1–1	2–1	1–1	1–1	0–0	0–0	3–0	2–0	1–0	0–0	1–1	—	2–2	1–1	1–0	0–0	1–1	3–1
Sampdoria	2–0	2–0	0–0	0–1	1–0	0–2	0–0	1–1	0–0	3–1	3–2	0–0	1–1	0–0	—	0–0	0–0	3–3	1–1	2–0
Spal	0–0	2–1	1–1	1–0	0–1	0–1	2–0	0–0	3–2	1–1	1–2	1–1	1–1	4–0	3–2	—	0–2	1–1	1–1	3–0
Taranto	1–0	0–0	0–0	1–0	0–0	1–1	1–1	0–0	1–0	0–0	0–1	0–0	0–0	2–0	0–0	1–0	—	1–1	0–1	3–2
Ternana	2–2	0–0	1–1	0–0	1–1	4–1	1–0	3–1	1–0	2–2	0–0	1–1	1–0	0–0	2–1	1–1	1–1	—	0–1	0–1
Udinese	1–1	1–1	0–0	1–1	2–0	2–0	1–0	1–1	3–0	1–0	1–0	2–0	2–0	1–0	3–2	2–0	3–1	4–0	—	1–0
Varese	1–1	3–3	0–2	0–3	1–1	1–0	1–1	2–2	1–1	0–0	2–1	0–1	1–0	2–2	2–2	0–1	1–1	1–0	2–2	—

Legend: Blue = home team win; Yellow = draw; Red = away team win.

== Promotion tie-breaker ==
Played in Bologna on July 1st

Team 1	Score	Team 2
Monza (Italy)	0-2	(Italy) Pescara

Pescara promoted to Serie A.

== Attendances ==
#	Club	Average
1	Cagliari	25,048
2	Bari	20,089
3	Pescara	19,794
4	Genoa	19,709
5	Udinese	18,085
6	Palermo	15,429
7	Sampdoria	13,348
8	Foggia	12,741
9	Taranto	11,179
10	Lecce	11,057
11	SPAL	11,043
12	Pistoiese	10,010
13	Brescia	9,802
14	Ternana	9,607
15	Cesena	8,366
16	Nocerina	7,569
17	Sambenedettese	7,238
18	Rimini	6,148
19	Monza	5,630
20	Varese	3,588

== References and sources ==
- Almanacco Illustrato del Calcio - La Storia 1898-2004, Panini Edizioni, Modena, September 2005

Specific
