= Professional Indoor Football League (disambiguation) =

Professional Indoor Football League may refer to:

- Professional Indoor Football League (1998), an indoor American football league founded in 1998 that ceased operation after its one season
- Indoor Professional Football League (1999–2001), an indoor American football league, successor to the 1998 PIFL, active 1999–2001
- Professional Indoor Football League, an indoor American football league founded in 2012 which operated until 2015

== See also ==
- Indoor Football League (2008), a professional indoor American football league founded in 2008
- Indoor Football League (1999–2000), a professional indoor American football league active 1999-2000
