= NAFL =

NAFL or Nafl may refer to:

== Sports ==
- National-American Football League, a name briefly used by the National Football League
- North American Football League, an American football league
- North American Football League, a minor league football league from 1999-2010
- North American Football League (1964), an American football league
- North American Soccer Football League, an association football league also known as the North American Football League
- Northern Amateur Football League, an association football league in Northern Ireland
- North American Floorball League, an American floorball league

== Other uses ==
- Non-alcoholic fatty liver, one of the two types of non-alcoholic fatty liver disease

== See also ==
- Nafl (disambiguation)
