= 1955–56 Serie B =

Italian football league season

Serie B
- Season: 1955–56
- Champions: Udinese; 2nd title

Serie B 1955-56 team distribution

The Serie B 1955–56 was the twenty-fourth tournament of this competition played in Italy since its creation.

== Teams ==
Bari and Livorno had been promoted from Serie C, while Udinese and Catania had been relegated from Serie A.

== Final classification ==
Pos	Team	Pld	W	D	L	GF	GA	GR	Pts	Promotion or relegation
1	Udinese (P, C)	34	21	7	6	66	31	2.129	49	Promotion to Serie A
2	Palermo (P)	34	17	13	4	41	34	1.206	47	Promotion to Serie A
3	Como	34	17	9	8	54	33	1.636	43	
3	Simmenthal-Monza	34	17	9	8	44	29	1.517	43	
5	Catania	34	14	12	8	42	28	1.500	40	
5	Cagliari	34	15	10	9	51	45	1.133	40	
7	Brescia	34	11	12	11	34	43	0.791	34	
8	Modena	34	10	13	11	46	38	1.211	33	
9	Alessandria	34	11	10	13	40	36	1.111	32	
9	Verona	34	12	8	14	45	49	0.918	32	
11	Bari	34	13	5	16	45	44	1.023	31	
11	Messina	34	11	9	14	41	45	0.911	31	
11	Taranto	34	10	11	13	34	39	0.872	31	
14	Legnano	34	10	10	14	40	47	0.851	30	
15	Parma	34	10	8	16	36	46	0.783	28	
16	Marzotto	34	10	7	17	30	48	0.625	27	
17	Livorno (R)	34	7	8	19	37	64	0.578	22	Relegation to Serie C
18	Salernitana (R)	34	4	11	19	30	57	0.526	19	Relegation to Serie C

Source: Panini
(C) Champions; (P) Promoted; (R) Relegated

== Results ==
Home \ Away	ALE	BAR	BRE	CAG	CTN	COM	LEG	LIV	MAR	MES	MOD	PAL	PAR	SAL	SMN	TAR	UDI	HEL
Alessandria		3–1	0–0	1–1	0–0	1–1	1–2	3–1	2–0	2–1	0–0	2–1	4–0	0–0	0–2	4–1	1–0	1–2
Bari	0–2		0–1	1–2	2–3	2–1	3–1	2–0	1–0	1–1	2–0	0–1	3–1	2–0	0–1	2–4	3–2	3–1
Brescia	1–0	1–1		2–2	1–1	1–1	1–0	2–1	1–0	1–3	1–1	1–1	2–0	2–1	0–2	2–1	1–1	2–1
Cagliari	4–3	3–3	2–0		1–1	1–0	1–0	1–0	2–2	3–2	2–0	1–1	0–1	3–2	1–0	2–1	2–0	2–0
Catania	3–1	1–2	1–2	1–0		1–0	3–0	3–0	1–0	2–0	3–1	1–1	2–0	1–1	3–1	2–0	0–0	1–0
Como	1–0	2–0	2–0	3–3	2–1		2–1	2–1	2–0	2–0	3–1	1–0	4–1	5–1	1–2	2–2	2–1	2–0
Legnano	0–0	1–3	0–0	2–3	2–1	2–1		4–2	1–0	4–0	2–2	1–1	1–1	3–2	1–0	0–0	2–2	2–2
Livorno	2–1	1–0	3–2	0–2	1–1	2–0	1–3		2–0	1–1	1–0	2–3	1–1	1–1	1–1	2–0	1–1	2–2
Marzotto	1–1	0–4	2–0	3–1	2–1	0–0	2–0	4–3		2–0	0–0	1–1	0–0	2–0	1–4	0–1	0–2	1–0
Messina	1–0	1–0	2–0	7–4	0–1	0–0	0–0	1–0	0–1		1–1	3–3	1–0	2–0	0–0	2–0	1–3	3–1
Modena	4–1	1–1	1–1	4–1	1–0	1–1	3–1	8–1	1–1	1–0		0–1	1–1	2–0	1–1	3–0	0–3	0–2
Palermo	0–0	1–0	1–0	0–0	3–3	1–0	3–2	1–0	1–0	2–1	1–0		1–0	1–0	1–1	1–0	1–1	2–0
Parma	1–3	1–1	2–0	1–0	1–0	1–2	0–0	3–1	4–0	2–3	0–1	0–1		0–0	2–2	3–0	1–0	2–1
Salernitana	1–0	1–0	2–2	1–1	0–0	1–3	0–1	1–1	0–2	2–1	0–3	5–0	2–3		0–1	0–0	1–2	0–1
Simm.-Monza	1–0	0–1	4–1	1–0	0–0	1–3	1–0	1–0	3–0	1–0	1–1	1–1	2–1	3–3		2–0	2–1	2–1
Taranto	0–0	2–0	0–0	0–0	0–0	1–1	1–0	5–1	3–2	1–1	1–1	0–1	1–0	3–0	1–0		1–1	3–1
Udinese	1–0	2–0	3–0	1–0	3–0	1–0	3–0	2–1	2–0	3–1	3–2	5–1	3–1	5–1	2–0	2–1		3–2
Hellas Verona	2–3	2–1	1–3	1–0	0–0	2–2	2–1	2–0	4–1	1–1	1–0	2–2	3–1	1–1	1–0	1–0	2–2	

Source: Almanacco Illustrato del Calcio - La Storia 1898-2004, Panini Edizioni, Modena, September 2005 (in Italian)
Legend: Blue = home team win; Yellow = draw; Red = away team win.

== References and sources ==
- Almanacco Illustrato del Calcio - La Storia 1898-2004, Panini Edizioni, Modena, September 2005
