= Arne Selmosson =

Swedish footballer

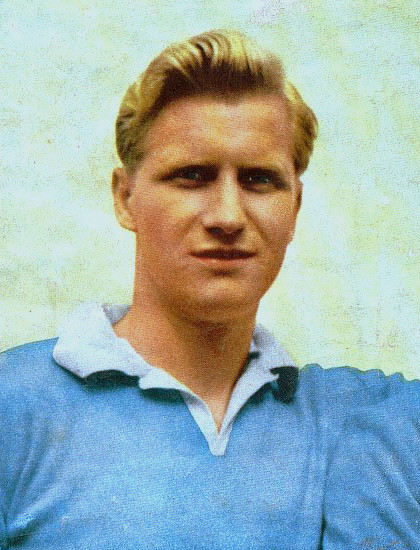
- Selmosson with Lazio in 1955

Personal information
- Date of birth: 29 March 1931
- Place of birth: Götene, Sweden
- Date of death: 19 February 2002 (aged 70)
- Place of death: Stockholm, Sweden
- Height: 1.70 m (5 ft 7 in)
- Position: Striker

Senior career*
Years	Team	Apps	(Gls)
1950–1954	Jönköpings Södra	81	(33)
1954–1955	Udinese	34	(14)
1955–1958	Lazio	101	(31)
1958–1961	Roma	87	(30)
1961–1964	Udinese	73	(18)
1964–1966	Skövde AIK		
Total		376	(126)

International career
1951–1958	Sweden	4	(1)
- * Club domestic league appearances and goals

Arne Selmosson (29 March 1931 – 19 February 2002) was a Swedish footballer who played as a striker.

== Club career ==
Born in Götene, Selmosson played for Jönköpings Södra, Udinese, Lazio, Roma and Skövde AIK.

== International career ==
Selmosson earned four caps for the Sweden national team between 1951 and 1958, scoring one goal, and played on home soil at the 1958 FIFA World Cup, achieving runners-up status.

== Honours ==
Individual

- Corriere dello Sport Serie A Team of The Year: 1955, 1957, 1958, 1959
