= 1941–42 AS Roma season =

Roma
1941–42 season
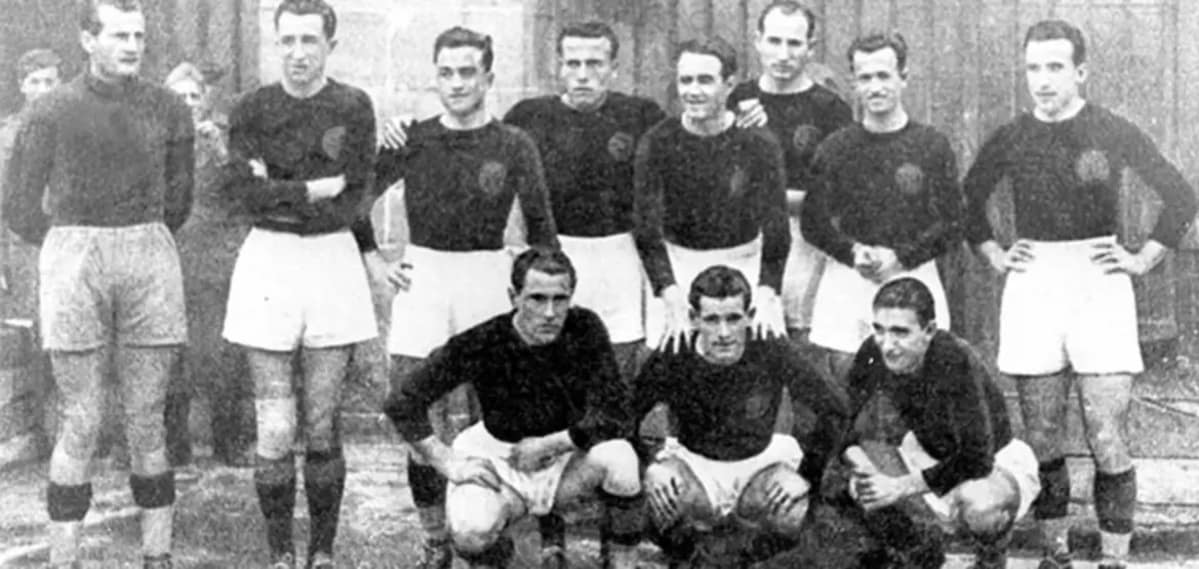
- Chairman: Edgardo Bazzini
- Manager: Alfréd Schaffer
- Stadium: Stadio Nazionale del PNF
- Serie A: 1st
- Coppa Italia: Round of 32
- Top goalscorer: League: Amadei (18); All: Amadei (18)
Home colours	Away colours	Third colours

During the 1941–42 season Associazione Sportiva Roma competed in Serie A and Coppa Italia.

== Summary ==
The 1941–42 Serie A campaign started with a delay of one month. Actually Roma was non favourite to win the title due to last season results with an 11th spot. Igino Betti left the club leadership to Edgardo Bazzini. The team grab the transferred in Edmondo Mornese from Novara, winger Renato Cappellini from Napoli, known as "Il barone" by giallorossi fans, defender Sergio Andreoli and, nearby closure of the transfers market, goalkeeper Fosco Risorti. The squad showed a competitive style of play clinching the leader spot of the table from the very first round. On 1 February 1942 clinched the Winter championship and on 14 June won its first Italian title ever, thanks to the victory 2–0 against Modena scoring Renato Cappellini. and Ermes Borsetti: the club broke the Northern Supremacy on scudetto winning champions ending the trophy to a squad from center-south of Italy.

== Squad ==
Source: Note: Flags indicate national team as defined under FIFA eligibility rules; some limited exceptions apply. Players may hold more than one non-FIFA nationality.

Pos.	Nation	Player
GK	ITA	Ippolito Ippoliti
GK	ITA	Guido Masetti (Captain)
GK	ITA	Fosco Risorti
DF	ITA	Mario Acerbi
DF	ITA	Sergio Andreoli
DF	ITA	Luigi Brunella
DF	ITA	Luigi Nobile
MF	ITA	Giuseppe Bonomi
MF	ITA	Renato Cappellini
MF	ITA	Aristide Coscia

Pos.	Nation	Player
MF	ITA	Mario De Grassi
MF	ITA	Luigi Di Pasquale
MF	ITA	Aldo Donati
MF	ITA	Paolo Jacobini
MF	ALB	Naim Krieziu
MF	ITA	Edmondo Mornese
FW	ITA	Amedeo Amadei
FW	ITA	Cesare BenedettiI
FW	ITA	Ermes Borsetti
FW	ARG	Miguel Ángel Pantó

=== Transfers ===
In
Pos.	Name	from	Type
GK	Fosco Risorti	Savoia	
DF	Sergio Andreoli	Perugia	(25,000 £)
MF	Renato Cappellini	Napoli	(140,000 £)
MF	Luigi Di Pasquale	Padova	
MF	Edmondo Mornese	Novara	definitivo (120,000 £)
FW	Cesare Benedetti (I)	Ilva Savona	

Out
Pos.	Name	To	Type
GK	Ugo Ceresa	Ferrara	
GK	Amedeo Rega	Lazio	
DF	Pietro Acquarone	Venezia	
DF	Romolo Alzani	Calcio Ala Italiana	
DF	Erminio Asin	-	released
MF	Cataldo Spitale	Gimnasia La Plata	
FW	Trentino Bui	Vis Pesaro	
FW	Omero Carmellini	Alba Motor	
FW	Francisco Providente	Calcio Velez	

== Competitions ==
=== Serie A ===
==== League table ====
Pos	Team	Pld	W	D	L	GF	GA	GR	Pts
1	Roma (C)	30	16	10	4	55	21	2.619	42
2	Torino	30	16	7	7	60	39	1.538	39
3	Venezia	30	15	8	7	40	25	1.600	38
4	Genova 1893	30	13	11	6	53	35	1.514	37
5	Lazio	30	14	9	7	55	37	1.486	37

Source: goal average officially used in event of equal points.
(C) Champions

==== Matches ====
Win Draw Loss

25 October 1941 1	Roma	5–1	Napoli	Rome
15:30	Di Pasquale 13'; Coscia 20' (pen.); Amadei 42', 85', 88'	Report	37' Dugini	Stadium: Stadio Nazionale del PNF; Attendance: 15 000; Referee: Giuseppe Scarpi

2 November 1941 2	Bologna	1–2	Roma	Bologna
	Andreoli 79'	Report	55' Donati; 82' Krieziu	Stadium: Stadio del Littoriale; Referee: Rinaldo Barlassina

9 November 1941 3	Roma	2–0	Juventus	Rome
15:30	Krieziu 16'; Pantó 52'	Report		Stadium: Stadio Nazionale del PNF; Attendance: 28 000; Referee: Raffaele Scorzoni

16 November 1941 4	Genoa 1941	2–0	Roma	Genoa
	Conti 44', 60'	Report		Stadium: Stadio Luigi Ferraris; Referee: Achille Pizziolo

23 November 1941 5	Fiorentina	2–2	Roma	Florence
	Penzo 19'; Valcareggi 51' (pen.)	Report	24' Pantó; 47' Amadei	Stadium: Stadio Giovanni Berta; Referee: Rinaldo Barlassina

30 November 1941 6	Roma	2–0	Milan	Rome
	Di Pasquale 29'; Donati 45'	Report		Stadium: Stadio Nazionale del PNF; Attendance: 28.000 circa Referee: Bertolio

7 December 1941 7	Atalanta	2–2	Roma	Bergamo
	Corbelli 15', 48'	Report	38' Pantó; 69' (pen.) Mornese	Stadium: Stadio Mario Brumana; Attendance: 8 000; Referee: Giovanni Galeati

14 December 1941 8	Roma	0–0	Venezia	Rome
15:30		Report		Stadium: Stadio Nazionale del PNF; Attendance: 25,000; Referee: Renzo Curradi

21 December 1941 9	Triestina	0–0	Roma	Trieste
		Report		Stadium: Stadio Littorio; Attendance: 14,000; Referee: Raffaele Scorzoni

28 December 1941 10	Roma	0–0	Torino	Rome
15:30		Report		Stadium: Stadio Nazionale del PNF; Attendance: 20 000; Referee: Mario Scotto

4 January 1942 11	Liguria	0–3	Roma	Genoa
		Report	46' Coscia; 62' Cappellini; 74' Amadei	Stadium: Stadio del Littorio; Attendance: 9 000; Referee: Giacomo Bertolio

11 January 1942 12	Roma	2–1	Lazio	Rome
15:30	Amadei 17'; Faotto 90+2' (o.g.)	Report	26' Piola	Stadium: Stadio Nazionale del PNF; Attendance: 30 000; Referee: Raffele Scorzoni

18 January 1942 13	Ambrosiana-Inter	0–2	Roma	Milan
		Report	45', 86' Krieziu	Stadium: Arena Civica; Attendance: 20.000 circa Referee: Giovanni Galeati

25 January 1942 14	Roma	4–0	Livorno	Rome
15:30	Del Bianco 51' (o.g.); Pantó 55'; Amadei 70', 77'	Report		Stadium: Stadio Nazionale del PNF; Attendance: 10 000; Referee: Giorgio Bernardi

1 February 1942 15	Modena	0–0	Roma	Modena
		Report		Stadium: Stadio Cesare Marzari; Attendance: 10 000; Referee: Mario Ciamberlini

15 February 1942 16	Napoli	1–1	Roma	Naples
	Verrina 67'	Report	30' Amadei	Stadium: Stadio Partenopeo; Attendance: 15 000; Referee: Giuseppe Zelocchi

22 February 1942 17	Roma	1–0	Bologna	Rome
15:30	Renato Cappellini 80'	Report		Stadium: Stadio Nazionale del PNF; Attendance: 29 000; Referee: Giacomo Bertolio

1 March 1942 18	Juventus	2–0	Roma	Turin
	Colaneri 24'; Sentimenti III 77' (pen.)	Report		Stadium: Stadio Benito Mussolini; Attendance: 35 000; Referee: Rinaldo Barlassina

8 March 1942 19	Roma	1–2	Genoa 1941	Rome
15:30	Krieziu 82'	Report	46' Bertoni I 57' Ispiro	Stadium: Stadio Nazionale del PNF; Referee: Giuseppe Zelocchi

15 March 1942 20	Roma	1–0	Fiorentina	Rome
15:30	Pantó 80'	Report		Stadium: Stadio Nazionale del PNF; Attendance: 25 000; Referee: Rinaldo Barlassina

22 March 1942 21	Milan	4–2	Roma	Milan
	Meazza 6'; Boffi 49'; Bollano 64', 86'	Report	41' Amadei; 82' Krieziu	Stadium: Arena Civica; Referee: Raffaele Scorzoni

29 March 1942 22	Roma	2–0	Atalanta	Rome
15:30	Pantó 40', 56'	Report		Stadium: Stadio Nazionale del PNF; Attendance: 13 000; Referee: Achille Pizziolo

26 April 1942 23	Venezia	0–1	Roma	Venice
		Report	62' Amadei	Stadium: Stadio Pier Luigi Penzo; Attendance: 10 000; Referee: Mario Ciamberlini

3 May 1942 24	Roma	0–0	Triestina	Rome
		Report		Stadium: Stadio Nazionale del PNF; Referee: Giorgio Bernardi

10 May 1942 25	Torino	2–2	Roma	Turin
	Baldi 9'; Petron 76'	Report	6', 24' Amadei	Stadium: Stadio Filadelfia; Attendance: 30 000; Referee: Giovanni Galeati

17 May 1942 26	Roma	7–0	Liguria	Rome
	Borsetti 2'; Cappellini 52'; Amadei 57', 70', 73'; Coscia 63'; Pantó 83'			Stadium: Stadio Nazionale del PNF; Referee: Raffaele Scorzon

24 May 1942 27	Lazio	1–1	Roma	Rome
	Puccinelli 68'	Report	5' Pantó	Stadium: Stadio Nazionale del PNF; Referee: Rinaldo Barlassina

31 May 1942 28	Roma	6–0	Ambrosiana-Inter	Rome
	Pantó 5', 82'; Amadei 8'; Borsetti 38', 59'; Coscia 84'			Stadium: Stadio Nazionale del PNF; Referee: Mario Ciamberlini

7 June 1942 29	Livorno	0–2	Roma	Livorno
			24' Pantó; 81' Amadei	Stadium: Stadio Edda Ciano Mussolini; Referee: Giovanni Galeati

14 June 1942 30	Roma	2–0	Modena	Rome
	Cappellini 21'; Borsetti 35'	Report		Stadium: Stadio Nazionale del PNF; Referee: Mario Ciamberlini

=== Coppa Italia ===
==== Round of 32 ====
12 October 1941	Novara	1–0 (a.e.t.)	Roma	Novara
	Calzolai 113'	Report		Stadium: Stadio Littorio; Referee: Renzo Curradi

== Statistics ==
=== Squad statistics ===
Competition	Points	Home						Away						Total						GD
Competition	Points	G	W	D	L	Gs	Ga	G	W	D	L	Gs	Ga	G	W	D	L	Gs	Ga	GD
Serie A	42	15	11	3	1	35	4	15	5	7	3	20	17	30	16	10	4	55	21	+34
Coppa Italia		-	-	-	-	-	-	1	0	0	1	0	1	1	0	0	1	0	1	-1
Total		15	11	3	1	35	4	16	5	7	4	20	18	31	16	10	5	55	22	+33

=== Players statistics ===
==== Appearances ====
- 0. (Italy) Ippolito Ippoliti
- 30. (Italy) Guido Masetti
- 1. (Italy) Fosco Risorti
- 10. (Italy) Mario Acerbi
- 20. (Italy) Sergio Andreoli
- 31. (Italy) Luigi Brunella
- 1. (Italy) Luigi Nobile
- 25. (Italy) Giuseppe Bonomi
- 18. (Italy) Renato Cappellini
- 31. (Italy) Aristide Coscia
- 1. (Italy) Mario De Grassi
- 9. (Italy) Luigi Di Pasquale
- 29. (Italy) Aldo Donati
- 7. (Italy) Paolo Jacobini
- 24. (Albania) Naim Krieziu
- 30. (Italy) Edmondo Mornese
- 31. (Italy) Amedeo Amadei
- 3. (Italy) Cesare Benedetti
- 9. (Italy) Ermes Borsetti
- 31. (Argentina) Miguel Ángel Pantó

==== Goalscorers ====
- 18. (Italy) Amedeo Amadei
- 12. (Argentina) Miguel Ángel Pantó
- 6. (Albania) Naim Krieziu
- 4. (Italy) Renato Cappellini
- 4. (Italy) Aristide Coscia
- 2. (Italy) Luigi Di Pasquale
- 2. (Italy) Aldo Donati
- 6. (Italy) Naim Krieziu
- 1. (Italy) Edmondo Mornese
- 4. (Italy) Ermes Borsetti

== Bibliography ==
- Paolo Castellani, Massimilano Ceci and Riccardo de Conciliis, Roma (2012). La maglia che ci unisce. Storia delle divise dell'AS Roma dalla nascita ai giorni nostri. Goalbook Edizioni,2012. ISBN 978-88-908115-0-0.

== Videography ==
- Manuela Romano (a cura di). "La storia della A.S. Roma". Corriere dello Sport, Rai Trade, 2006, 10 DVD-Video.
