= 1941 Coppa Italia final =

7th Coppa Italia final
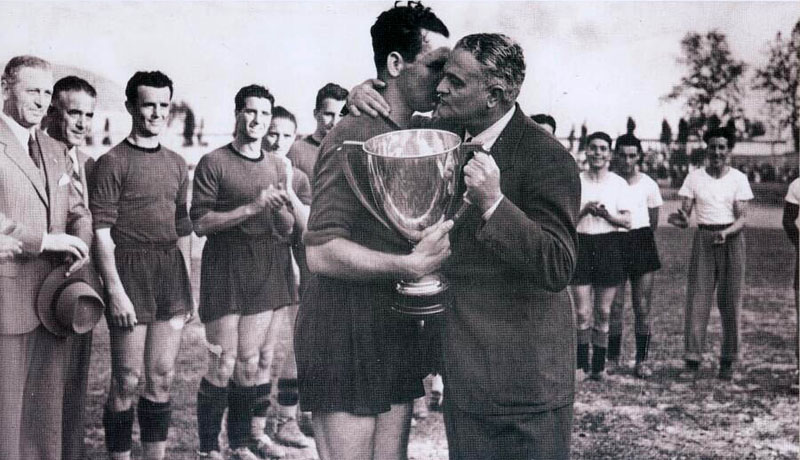
- Venezia's captain Tortora receives the trophy
- Event: 1940–41 Coppa Italia
Roma	Venezia
3	4

First leg
Roma	Venezia
3	3
- Date: 8 June 1941
- Venue: Stadio Nazionale, Rome
- Referee: Renzo Curradi

Second leg
Venezia	Roma
1	0
- Date: 15 June 1941
- Venue: Stadio Pier Luigi Penzo, Venice
- Referee: Raffaele Scorzoni

The 1941 Coppa Italia final was the final of the 1940–41 Coppa Italia. It was held on 8 and 15 June 1941 between Roma and Venezia. The first leg, played in Rome, ended 3–3; the second leg was played seven days later in Venice, where hometown team won 1–0.

== First leg ==
8 June 1941

Roma	3–3	Venezia
Amadei 14', 16', 19'		Mazzola 37'; Diotalevi 64'; Alberti 68'

Stadio Nazionale, Rome
Referee: Renzo Curradi

Roma	Venezia

GK	1	(Italy) Guido Masetti
DF	2	(Italy) Mario Acerbi
DF	3	(Italy) Luigi Brunella
MF	4	(Italy) Giuseppe Bonomi
MF	5	(Italy) Ermes Borsetti
MF	6	(Italy) Aldo Donati
MF	7	(Italy) Paolo Jacobini
FW	8	(Italy) Amedeo Amadei
FW	9	(Italy) Aristide Coscia
FW	10	(Albania) Naim Krieziu
FW	11	(Argentina) (Italy) Miguel Ángel Pantó
Manager:
(Hungarian People's Republic) Alfréd Schaffer

GK	1	(Italy) Giorgio Fioravanti
DF	2	(Italy) Silvio Di Gennaro
DF	3	(Italy) Gianemilio Piazza
DF	4	(Uruguay) Victor Tortora
MF	5	(Italy) Ezio Loik
MF	6	(Italy) Sandro Puppo
MF	7	(Italy) Lidio Stefanini
FW	8	(Italy) Lanfranco Alberico
FW	9	(Uruguay) Juan Agostino Alberti
FW	10	(Italy) Alfredo Diotalevi
FW	11	(Italy) Valentino Mazzola
Manager:
(Italy) Giovanni Rebuffo

== Second leg ==
15 June 1941

Venezia	1–0	Roma
Loik 73'

Stadio Pier Luigi Penzo, Venice
Referee: Raffaele Scorzoni

Venezia

GK	1	(Italy) Giorgio Fioravanti
DF	2	(Italy) Silvio Di Gennaro
DF	3	(Italy) Gianemilio Piazza
DF	4	(Uruguay) Victor Tortora
MF	5	(Italy) Ezio Loik
MF	6	(Italy) Sandro Puppo
MF	7	(Italy) Lidio Stefanini
FW	8	(Italy) Lanfranco Alberico
FW	9	(Uruguay) Juan Agostino Alberti
FW	10	(Italy) Alfredo Diotalevi
FW	11	(Italy) Valentino Mazzola
Manager:
(Italy) Giovanni Rebuffo

GK	1	(Italy) Guido Masetti
DF	2	(Italy) Mario Acerbi
DF	3	(Italy) Luigi Brunella
MF	4	(Italy) Giuseppe Bonomi
MF	5	(Italy) Ermes Borsetti
MF	6	(Italy) Aldo Donati
MF	7	(Italy) Paolo Jacobini
FW	8	(Italy) Amedeo Amadei
FW	9	(Italy) Aristide Coscia
FW	10	(Albania) Naim Krieziu
FW	11	(Argentina) (Italy) Miguel Ángel Pantó
Manager:
(Hungarian People's Republic) Alfréd Schaffer
