= List of AS Roma players =

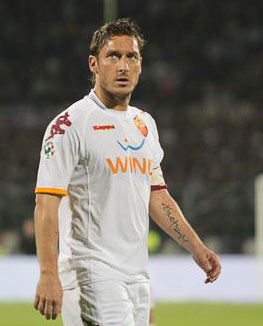
Francesco Totti, most capped player and number-one goalscorer in Roma's history.

This is a list of notable footballers who have played for AS Roma. This means players that have played 100 or more official matches for the club.

For a list of all Roma players, major or minor, with a Wikipedia article, see Category:AS Roma players; for a selected list of the best players in Roma's history, see AS Roma Hall of Fame. For a list of players with less than 100 matches played, see List of AS Roma players (25–99 appearances).

Players are listed as of 10 January 2021 and according to the date of their first-team debut for the club. Appearances and goals are for first-team competitive matches only; wartime matches are excluded. Substitute appearances included.

== Players ==
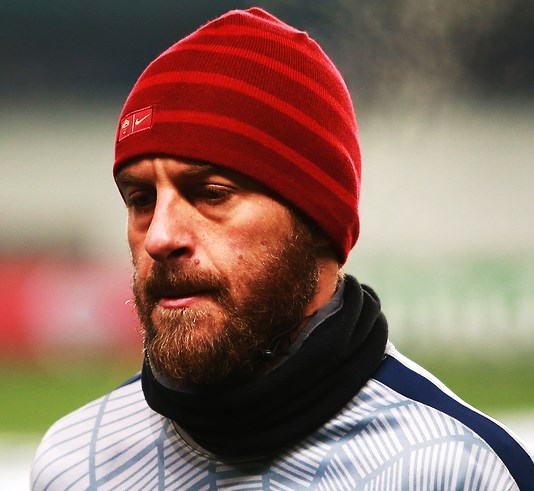
Daniele De Rossi is the second most-capped Roma player in club's history after legend Francesco Totti

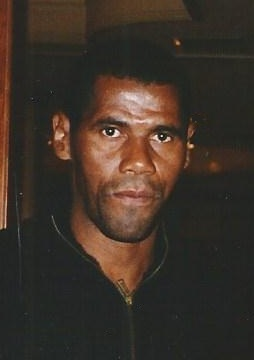
Aldair is the most-capped foreign player in Roma's history.

Nationality column refers to the country (countries) represented internationally by the player, if any.

Name	Nationality	Position	Roma career	Appearances	Goals
Cesare Augusto Fasanelli	Italy	MF	1927–1933	167	56
Arturo Chini Ludueña	Argentina	FW	1927–1934	160	42
Attilio Ferraris IV	Italy	MF	1927–1934; 1938-1939	217	2
Rodolfo Volk	Italy	FW	1928–1933	157	103
Fulvio Bernardini	Italy	MF	1928–1939	286	45
Raffaele Costantino	Italy	FW	1930–1935	157	42
Guido Masetti	Italy	GK	1930–1943	357	0
Andrea Gadaldi	Italy	MF	1933–1941	179	3
Eraldo Monzeglio	Italy	DF	1935–1939	?	?
Amedeo Amadei	Italy	FW	1936–1938; 1939–1948	216	101
Miguel Angel Pantò	Argentina	FW	1939–1947	?	?
Luigi Brunella	Italy	DF	1939–1948	158	2
Fosco Risorti	Italy	GK	1941–1952	205	0
Sergio Andreoli	Italy	DF	1941–1950	205	13
Arcadio Venturi	Italy	MF	1948–1957	288	17
Armando Tre Re	Italy	DF	1949–1954	169	6
Alcides Ghiggia	Uruguay; Italy	RW	1953–1961	201	19
Giosuè Stucchi	Italy	DF	1954–1961	159	2
Luigi Giuliano	Italy	MF	1954–1962	140	9
Giacomo Losi	Italy	DF	1954–1969	455	2
Dino da Costa	Brazil	FW	1955–1960; 1961–1962	149	71
Luciano Panetti	Italy	GK	1955–1961	146	0
Paolo Pestrin	Italy	MF	1956–1963	195	17
Alberto Orlando	Italy	MF	1957–1958; 1959–1964	140	17
Fabio Cudicini	Italy	GK	1958–1963	165	0
Pedro Waldemar Manfredini	Argentina	FW	1959–1965	130	76
Giulio Corsini	Italy	DF	1960–1964	145	1
Giancarlo De Sisti	Italy	MF	1960–1964; 1974–1979	222	22
Antonio Valentín Angelillo	Argentina; Italy	FW	1961–1965	106	27
Sergio Carpanesi	Italy	GK	1961–1967	158	0
Alberto Ginulfi	Italy	GK	1962–1975	160	0
Elvio Salvori	Italy	SW – MF	1964–1966; 1968–1973	170	11
Francesco Cappelli	Italy	RB	1965–1966; 1967–1972	115	2
Joaquín Peiró	Spain	MF	1966–1970	128	28
Francesco Scaratti	Italy	MF	1967–1973	161	12
Franco Cordova	Italy	MF	1967–1976	212	9
Luciano Spinosi	Italy	RB	1967–1970; 1978-1982	150	6
Aldo Bet	Italy	DF	1968–1973	184	1
Sergio Santarini	Italy	DF	1968–1981	429	7
Walter Franzot	Italy	MF	1969–1973	106	7
Renato Cappellini	Italy	FW	1969–1974	136	33
Valerio Spadoni	Italy	MF	1971–1976	108	18
Giorgio Morini	Italy	LB – MF	1971–1976	133	8
Franco Peccenini	Italy	DF	1971–1980	183	1
Francesco Rocca	Italy	LB	1972–1981	172	2
Agostino Di Bartolomei	Italy	MF	1972–1984	293	64
Paolo Conti	Italy	GK	1973–1980	205	0
Bruno Conti	Italy	LW	1973–1975; 1976–1991	402	47
Domenico Maggiora	Italy	DF	1976–1982	155	2
Roberto Pruzzo	Italy	FW	1978–1988	315	136
Franco Tancredi	Italy	GK	1978–1990	383	0
Carlo Ancelotti	Italy	MF	1979–1987	227	18
Dario Bonetti	Italy	DF	1980–1982; 1983–1986	132	3
Paulo Roberto Falcão	Brazil	MF	1980–1985	152	28
Odoacre Chierico	Italy	RW	1981–1985	119	10
Ubaldo Righetti	Italy	RB	1981–1988	171	2
Sebastiano Nela	Italy	RB	1981–1992	397	20
Giuseppe Giannini	Italy	MF	1981–1996	437	75
Aldo Maldera	Italy	DF	1982–1985	117	8
Toninho Cerezo	Brazil	MF	1983–1986	104	25
Emidio Oddi	Italy	LB	1983–1989	207	4
Stefano Desideri	Italy	MF	1985–1991	190	32
Manuel Gerolin	Italy	DF	1985–1991	192	9
Rudi Völler	Germany	FW	1987–1992	196	69
Gianluca Signorini	Italy	DF	1987–1993	132	5
Fabrizio Di Mauro	Italy	MF	1988–1992	130	9
Ruggiero Rizzitelli	Italy	FW	1988–1994	209	54
Giovanni Piacentini	Italy	MF	1989–1995	187	2
Giovanni Cervone	Italy	GK	1989–1997	198	0
Fabio Petruzzi	Italy	DF	1989–1990; 1991–1999	135	0
Fausto Salsano	Italy	MF	1990–1993	108	8
Amedeo Carboni	Italy	LB	1990–1997	229	5
Aldair	Brazil	DF	1990–2004	436	20
Walter Bonacina	Italy	MF	1991–1994	114	2
Luigi Garzja	Italy	DF	1991–1994	102	0
Thomas Häßler	Germany	RW	1991–1994	116	13
Francesco Totti	Italy	FW	1992–2017	786	307
Massimiliano Cappioli	Italy	MF	1993–1996	110	19
Marco Lanna	Italy	DF	1993–1997	121	2
Abel Balbo	Argentina	FW	1993–1998; 2000–2002	175	87
Luigi Di Biagio	Italy	MF	1995–1999	122	18
Marco Delvecchio	Italy	FW	1995–2005	296	83
Damiano Tommasi	Italy	MF	1996–2006	314	19
Eusebio Di Francesco	Italy	MF	1997–2001	102	14
Antônio Carlos	Brazil	DF	1997–2002	116	2
Cafu	Brazil	RB – RW	1997–2003	218	8
Vincent Candela	France	LB	1997–2005	253	14
Francesco Antonioli	Italy	GK	1999–2003	130	0
Vincenzo Montella	Italy	FW	1999–2006; 2008–2009	239	94
Hidetoshi Nakata	Japan	MF	2000–2001	30	5
Jonathan Zebina	France	DF	2000–2004	123	1
Emerson	Brazil	MF	2000–2004	143	20
Walter Samuel	Argentina	DF	2000–2004	168	11
Francisco Lima	Brazil	MF	2001–2004	130	0
Antonio Cassano	Italy	FW	2001–2005	161	52
Leandro Cufré	Argentina	LB	2001–2003; 2004–2006	107	2
Daniele De Rossi	Italy	MF	2001–2019	616	64
Christian Panucci	Italy	DF	2002–2009	311	29
Olivier Dacourt	France	MF	2003–2006	121	2
Cristian Chivu	Romania	DF	2003–2007	122	6
Mancini	Brazil	RW	2003–2008	213	55
Alberto Aquilani	Italy	MF	2003–2009	140	14
Simone Perrotta	Italy	MF	2004–2013	326	49
Matteo Ferrari	Italy	DF	2004–2005; 2006–2008	104	1
Philippe Mexès	France	DF	2004–2011	254	15
Rodrigo Taddei	Brazil	MF	2005–2014	265	29
Doni	Brazil	GK	2005–2011	193	0
Max Tonetto	Italy	DF	2006–2010	121	1
David Pizarro	Chile	MF	2006–2011	192	16
Marco Cassetti	Italy	DF	2006–2012	189	5
Mirko Vučinić	Montenegro	FW	2006–2011	196	63
Matteo Brighi	Italy	MF	2007–2011	135	13
Juan	Brazil	DF	2007–2012	139	10
Jérémy Ménez	France	FW	2008–2011	105	11
John Arne Riise	Norway	LB	2008–2011	131	11
Nicolás Burdisso	Argentina	DF	2009–2014	123	6
Miralem Pjanić	Bosnia and Herzegovina	MF	2011–2016	185	30
Alessandro Florenzi	Italy	RB	2011; 2012–2020	261	28
Federico Balzaretti	Italy	MF	2012–2015	39	2
Kevin Strootman	Netherlands	MF	2013–2018	130	13
Radja Nainggolan	Belgium	MF	2014–2018	203	33
Kostas Manolas	Greece	DF	2014–2019	206	8
Lorenzo Pellegrini	Italy	MF	2014–2015; 2017-	348	62
Leandro Paredes	Argentina	MF	2014–2017; 2023-2025	135	13
Edin Džeko	Bosnia and Herzegovina	FW	2015–2021	260	119
Stephan El Shaarawy	Italy	FW	2016–2019; 2019-2026	348	66
Diego Perotti	Argentina	FW	2016–2020	138	32
Bruno Peres	Brazil	RB	2016–2021	132	6
Juan Jesus	Brazil	DF	2016–2021	102	1
Federico Fazio	Argentina	DF	2016–2022	163	13
Aleksandar Kolarov	Serbia	LB	2017–2020	132	19
Rick Karsdorp	Netherlands	RB	2017–2024	157	1
Nicolò Zaniolo	Italy	AM	2018–2023	128	24
Bryan Cristante	Italy	MF	2018–	368	20
Jordan Veretout	France	MF	2019–2022	131	22
Henrikh Mkhitaryan	Armenia	AM	2019–2022	117	29
Roger Ibañez	Brazil	DF	2019–2023	149	9
Leonardo Spinazzola	Italy	LB	2019–2024	151	7
Chris Smalling	England	DF	2019–2024	155	10
Gianluca Mancini	Italy	DF	2019–	323	23
Rui Patrício	Portugal	GK	2021–2024	129	0
Edoardo Bove	Italy	MF	2020–2024	92	4
Nicola Zalewski	Poland; Italy	MF	2020–2025	123	2
Tammy Abraham	England	FW	2021–2024	120	37
Mile Svilar	Serbia; Belgium	DF	2022–	137	0
Zeki Çelik	Turkey	RB	2022–2026	151	2
Paulo Dybala	Argentina	FW	2022–	144	45
Evan Ndicka	Ivory Coast	DF	2022–	130	6

== Captains ==
Name	Position	Roma Career	Seasons as Captain	Appearances	Goals
(Italy) Attilio Ferraris IV	MF	1927–1934; 1938–1939	7 (1927–1934)	217	2
(Italy) Fulvio Bernardini	MF	1928–1939	5 (1934–1939)	286	45
(Italy) Guido Masetti	GK	1930–1943	4 (1939–1943)	339	0
(Italy) Amedeo Amadei	FW	1936–1938; 1939–1948	5 (1943–1948)	216	101
(Italy) Sergio Andreoli	DF	1941–1950	2 (1948–1950)	205	13
(Italy) Armando Tre Re	DF	1949–1954	3 (1950–1953)	169	6
(Italy) Arcadio Venturi	MF	1948–1957	4 (1953–1957)	288	17
(Uruguay) (Italy) Alcides Ghiggia	MF	1953–1961	1 (1957–1958)	201	19
(Italy) Egidio Guarnacci	MF	1953–1963	1 (1958–1959)	122	4
(Italy) Giacomo Losi	DF	1959–1969	9 (1959–1968)	450	2
(Spain) Joaquín Peiró	MF	1968–1970	2 (1968–1970)	128	28
(Spain) Luis del Sol	MF	1970–1972	2 (1970–1972)	59	4
(Italy) Franco Cordova	MF	1967–1976	4 (1972–1976)	212	9
(Italy) Sergio Santarini	DF	1968–1981	4 (1976–1980)	344	7
(Italy) Agostino Di Bartolomei	MF	1972–1984	4 (1980–1984)	293	64
(Italy) Carlo Ancelotti	MF	1979–1987	3 (1984–1987)	227	18
(Italy) Giuseppe Giannini	MF	1981–1996	9 (1987–1996)	437	75
(Italy) Amedeo Carboni	LB	1990–1997	1 (1996–1997)	229	5
(Argentina) Abel Balbo	FW	1993–1998; 2000–2002	1 (1997–1998)	175	78
(Italy) Francesco Totti	FW	1992–2017	19 (1998–2017)	786	307
(Italy) Daniele De Rossi	MF	2001–2019	2 (2017–2019)	616	64
(Italy) Alessandro Florenzi	RB	2011; 2012–2020	1 (2019–2020)	261	28
(Bosnia and Herzegovina) Edin Džeko	FW	2015–2021	1 (2020–2021)	179	87
(Italy) Lorenzo Pellegrini	MF	2014–2015; 2017–	4 (2021–2025)	229	36
(Italy) Bryan Cristante	MF	2018–	1 (2025–)	251	17

== Key ==
- GK – Goalkeeper
- SW – Sweeper
- RB – Right back
- LB – Left back
- DF – Defender
- MF – Midfielder
- RW – Right winger
- LW – Left winger
- FW – Forward
