= List of SSC Napoli seasons =

Società Sportiva Calcio Napoli is an Italian professional football club based in Naples, Campania, who play their matches in Stadio Diego Armando Maradona. The club was formed in 1926 and refounded in 2004, and the club's formal debut in an official league was also in 1926.

The club has won the Serie A four times, Serie B once, the Coppa Italia six times, the Supercoppa Italiana three times and the UEFA Cup once.

Napoli has played 80 seasons in the Serie A, 12 seasons in the Serie B, 2 seasons in the Serie C (or equivalent), 0 seasons in the Serie D (or equivalent) and 0 seasons in lower competitions.

This list details the club's achievements in major competitions, and the top scorers for each season. Records of local or regional competitions are not included due to them being considered of less importance.

== Key ==
- Pld = Matches played
- W = Matches won
- D = Matches drawn
- L = Matches lost
- GF = Goals for
- GA = Goals against
- Pts = Points
- Pos = Final position
- Serie A = 1st Tier in Italian League
- Serie B = 2nd Tier in Italian League
- Serie C = 3rd Tier in Italian League
- Prima Categoria = 1st Tier (until 1922)
- Promozione = 2nd Tier (until 1922)
- Prima Divisione = 1st Tier (until 1926)
- Prima Divisione = 2nd Tier (1926–1929)
- Seconda Divisione = 2nd Tier (until 1926)
- Seconda Divisione = 3rd Tier (1926–1929)
- Divisione Nazionale = 1st Tier (1926–1929)
- RU = Runners-up
- SF = Semi-finals
- QF = Quarter-finals
- R16 = Last 16
- R32 = Last 32
- QR1 = First Qualifying Round
- QR2 = Second Qualifying Round
- QR3 = Third Qualifying Round
- PO = Play-offs
- KRPO = Knockout Round Play-offs
- 1R = Round 1
- 2R = Round 2
- 3R = Round 3
- GS = Group Stage
- 2GS = 2nd Group Stage
- LP = League Phase
- EC = European Cup (1955–1992)
- UCL = UEFA Champions League (1993–present)
- CWC = UEFA Cup Winners' Cup (1960–1999)
- UC = UEFA Cup (1971–2008)
- UEL = UEFA Europa League (2009–present)
- USC = UEFA Super Cup
- INT = Intercontinental Cup (1960–2004)
- WC = FIFA Club World Cup (2005–present)

Champions	Runners-up	Promoted	Relegated	1st tier	2nd tier	3rd tier

== Seasons ==
Results of league and cup competitions by season
Season	Division	Pld	W	D	L	GF	GA	Pts	Pos	Cup	Supercoppa Italiana	Cup	Result	Player(s)	Goals
Season	League									Cup	Supercoppa Italiana	UEFA – FIFA		Top goalscorer(s)	
2025–26	Serie A (1)	38	23	7	8	58	36	76	2nd	QF	W	UCL	LP	Rasmus Højlund	16
2024–25	Serie A (1)	38	24	10	4	59	27	82	W	R16				Romelu Lukaku	14
2023–24	Serie A (1)	38	13	14	11	55	48	53	10th	R16	RU	UCL	R16	Victor Osimhen	17
2022–23	Serie A (1)	38	28	6	4	77	28	90	W	R16		UCL	QF	Victor Osimhen	31
2021–22	Serie A (1)	38	24	7	7	74	31	79	3rd	R16		UEL	KRPO	Victor Osimhen	18
2020–21	Serie A (1)	38	24	5	9	86	41	77	5th	SF	RU	UEL	R32	Lorenzo Insigne	19
2019–20	Serie A (1)	38	18	8	12	61	50	62	7th	W		UCL	R16	Dries Mertens	16
2018–19	Serie A (1)	38	24	7	7	74	36	79	2nd	QF		UCL UEL	GS QF	Arkadiusz Milik	20
2017–18	Serie A (1)	38	28	7	3	77	29	91	2nd	QF		UCL UEL	GS R32	Dries Mertens	22
2016–17	Serie A (1)	38	26	8	4	94	39	86	3rd	R16		UCL	R16	Dries Mertens	34
2015–16	Serie A (1)	38	25	7	6	80	32	82	2nd	QF		UEL	R32	Gonzalo Higuaín	38
2014–15	Serie A (1)	38	18	9	11	70	54	63	5th	SF	W	UCL UEL	PO SF	Gonzalo Higuaín	29
2013–14	Serie A (1)	38	23	9	6	77	39	78	3rd	W		UCL UEL	GS R16	Gonzalo Higuaín	24
2012–13	Serie A (1)	38	23	9	6	73	36	78	2nd	R16	RU	UEL	R32	Edinson Cavani	38
2011–12	Serie A (1)	38	16	13	9	66	46	61	5th	W		UCL	R16	Edinson Cavani	33
2010–11	Serie A (1)	38	21	7	10	59	39	70	3rd	QF		UEL	R32	Edinson Cavani	33
2009–10	Serie A (1)	38	15	14	9	50	43	59	6th	R16				Marek Hamšík	12
2008–09	Serie A (1)	38	12	10	16	43	45	46	12th	QF		UC	1R	Marek Hamšík	12
2007–08	Serie A (1)	38	14	8	16	60	53	50	8th	R16				Maurizio Domizzi Ezequiel Lavezzi	11
2006–07	Serie B (2)	42	21	16	5	52	29	79	2nd	R16				Emanuele Calaiò	16
2005–06	Serie C1 Girone B (3)	34	19	11	4	48	20	68	1st	R16				Emanuele Calaiò	19
2004–05	Serie C1 Girone B (3)	34	17	10	7	45	31	61	3rd					Roberto Sosa	10
2003–04	Serie B (2)	46	10	26	10	35	43	56	13th	GS				Davide Dionigi	8
2002–03	Serie B (2)	38	10	15	13	42	49	45	16th	GS				Davide Dionigi	19
2001–02	Serie B (2)	38	16	13	9	48	39	61	5th	GS				Roberto Stellone	13
2000–01	Serie A (1)	34	8	12	14	35	51	36	17th	2R				Nicola Amoruso	10
1999–2000	Serie B (2)	38	17	12	9	55	44	63	2nd	R16				Stefan Schwoch	26
1998–99	Serie B (2)	38	12	15	11	41	38	51	10th	1R				Francesco Turini	8
1997–98	Serie A (1)	38	2	8	24	25	76	14	18th	R16				Claudio Bellucci	13
1996–97	Serie A (1)	34	9	14	11	38	45	41	13th	RU				Alfredo Aglietti	9
1995–96	Serie A (1)	34	10	11	13	28	41	41	12th	2R				Arturo Di Napoli	5
1994–95	Serie A (1)	34	13	12	9	40	45	51	7th	QF		UC	R16	Massimo Agostini	13
1993–94	Serie A (1)	34	12	12	10	41	35	36	6th	2R				Daniel Fonseca	15
1992–93	Serie A (1)	34	10	12	12	49	50	32	11th	QF		UC	2R	Daniel Fonseca	24
1991–92	Serie A (1)	34	15	12	7	56	40	42	4th	R16				Careca	17
1990–91	Serie A (1)	34	11	15	8	37	37	37	8th	SF	W	EC	R16	Giuseppe Incocciati	11
1989–90	Serie A (1)	34	21	9	4	57	31	51	W	SF		UC	R16	Diego Maradona	18
1988–89	Serie A (1)	34	18	11	5	57	28	47	2nd	RU		UC	W	Careca	27
1987–88	Serie A (1)	30	15	12	3	41	21	42	2nd	QF		EC	1R	Diego Maradona	21
1986–87	Serie A (1)	30	18	6	6	55	27	42	W	W		UC	1R	Diego Maradona	17
1985–86	Serie A (1)	30	14	11	5	35	21	39	3rd	GS				Diego Maradona	13
1984–85	Serie A (1)	30	10	13	7	34	29	33	8th	R16				Diego Maradona	17
1983–84	Serie A (1)	30	7	12	11	28	38	26	12th	GS				Gianni De Rosa	8
1982–83	Serie A (1)	30	7	14	9	22	29	28	10th	QF		UC	R32	Ramón Díaz	8
1981–82	Serie A (1)	30	10	15	5	31	21	35	4th	QF		UC	1R	Claudio Pellegrini	13
1980–81	Serie A (1)	30	14	10	6	32	21	38	3rd	GS				Claudio Pellegrini	11
1979–80	Serie A (1)	30	7	14	9	20	20	28	10th	QF		UC	R32	Giuseppe Damiani	12
1978–79	Serie A (1)	30	9	14	7	23	21	32	6th	SF		UC	1R	Giuseppe Savoldi	11
1977–78	Serie A (1)	30	8	14	8	35	31	30	6th	RU				Giuseppe Savoldi	23
1976–77	Serie A (1)	30	9	11	10	37	38	28	7th	2R		CWC	SF	Giuseppe Savoldi	17
1975–76	Serie A (1)	30	13	10	7	40	27	36	5th	W		UC	1R	Giuseppe Savoldi	21
1974–75	Serie A (1)	30	14	13	3	50	22	41	2nd	SF		UC	R16	Sergio Clerici	16
1973–74	Serie A (1)	30	12	12	6	35	28	36	3rd	GS				Sergio Clerici	16
1972–73	Serie A (1)	30	7	14	9	18	20	28	9th	2R				Giuseppe Damiani	8
1971–72	Serie A (1)	30	6	16	8	27	31	28	8th	RU		UC	1R	José Altafini	10
1970–71	Serie A (1)	30	15	9	6	33	19	39	3rd	4th				José Altafini	11
1969–70	Serie A (1)	30	10	11	9	24	21	31	6th	GS		UC	R16	José Altafini	8
1968–69	Serie A (1)	30	10	12	8	26	25	32	7th	QF		UC	R32	José Altafini	8
1967–68	Serie A (1)	30	13	11	6	34	24	37	2nd	2R		UC	2R	José Altafini	17
1966–67	Serie A (1)	34	17	10	7	46	23	44	4th	QF		UC	R16	José Altafini	19
1965–66	Serie A (1)	34	17	11	6	44	27	45	3rd	2R				José Altafini	15
1964–65	Serie B (2)	38	16	16	6	45	21	48	2nd	QF				Cané	12
1963–64	Serie B (2)	38	12	15	11	39	35	39	7th	2R				Glauco Gilardoni	10
1962–63	Serie A (1)	34	9	9	16	35	59	27	16th	1R		CWC	QF	Gianni Corelli Giovanni Fanello Achille Fraschini	9
1961–62	Serie B (2)	38	15	13	10	44	35	43	2nd	W				Gianni Corelli	13
1960–61	Serie A (1)	34	7	11	16	30	47	25	17th	2R				Beniamino Di Giacomo	6
1959–60	Serie A (1)	34	8	13	13	33	48	29	13th	R16				Emanuele Del Vecchio	10
1958–59	Serie A (1)	34	9	16	9	39	50	34	9th	4R				Emanuele Del Vecchio	15
1957–58	Serie A (1)	34	17	6	11	65	55	40	4th	GS				Luís Vinício	21
1956–57	Serie A (1)	34	11	10	13	39	41	32	12th					Luís Vinício	18
1955–56	Serie A (1)	34	10	12	12	46	49	32	14th					Luís Vinício	16
1954–55	Serie A (1)	34	13	12	9	50	40	38	6th					Hasse Jeppson Giancarlo Vitali	10
1953–54	Serie A (1)	34	13	12	9	52	38	38	5th					Hasse Jeppson	20
1952–53	Serie A (1)	34	15	11	8	53	43	41	4th					Hasse Jeppson Giancarlo Vitali	14
1951–52	Serie A (1)	38	17	8	13	64	44	42	6th					Mario Astorri	13
1950–51	Serie A (1)	38	15	11	12	57	52	41	6th					Amedeo Amadei Naim Kryeziu	11
1949–50	Serie B (2)	42	27	7	8	76	34	61	1st					Ivo Šuprina	15
1948–49	Serie B (2)	42	17	11	14	43	40	45	6th					Renato Brighenti	8
1947–48	Serie A (1)	40	12	10	18	50	46	34	21st					Dante Di Benedetti	13
1946–47	Serie A (1)	38	14	9	15	50	59	37	8th					Umberto Busani	12
1945–46	Serie Mista A-B Centro-Sud (1-2); Girone Finale Divisione Nazionale (1-2)	20; 14	11; 5	6; 3	3; 6	28; 19	10; 27	28; 13	1st 5th					Carlo Barbieri	15
1944–45	World War II														
1943–44	World War II														
1942–43	Serie B (2)	32	16	9	7	46	27	41	3rd	R32				Vinicio Viani	16
1941–42	Serie A (1)	30	8	7	15	32	51	23	15th	R32				Umberto Busani	8
1940–41	Serie A (1)	30	11	8	11	41	48	30	8th	R32				Luigi Rosellini	13
1939–40	Serie A (1)	30	9	6	15	26	41	24	14th	R16				Carlo Alberto Quario	11
1938–39	Serie A (1)	30	10	11	9	30	35	31	7th	R32				Nereo Rocco	6
1937–38	Serie A (1)	30	8	12	10	37	39	28	10th	QF				Giuseppe Gerbi	8
1936–37	Serie A (1)	30	8	8	14	31	39	24	13th	QF				Giovanni Venditto	9
1935–36	Serie A (1)	30	11	6	13	42	45	28	9th	QF				Giovanni Busoni	12
1934–35	Serie A (1)	30	10	9	11	39	38	29	7th					Antonio Vojak	11
1933–34	Serie A (1)	34	19	8	7	46	30	46	3rd					Antonio Vojak	21
1932–33	Serie A (1)	34	18	6	10	64	38	42	4th					Antonio Vojak	22
1931–32	Serie A (1)	34	13	9	12	48	46	35	9th					Attila Sallustro	12
1930–31	Serie A (1)	34	18	1	15	54	49	37	6th					Antonio Vojak	20
1929–30	Serie A (1)	34	14	9	11	61	51	37	5th					Antonio Vojak	20
1928–29	Divisione Nazionale Girone B (1)	30	11	7	12	61	64	29	9th					Attila Sallustro	22
1927–28	Divisione Nazionale Girone A (1)	20	5	5	10	23	54	15	9th					Ernesto Ghisi	6
1926–27	Divisione Nazionale Girone A (1)	18	0	1	17	7	61	1	10th					Ernesto Ghisi	5
Total	Serie A, Divisione Nazionale (1)	2,590	1,015	795	766	3,439	3,019	3,061 (3,840)	4x Champ	6x Coppa	3x Supercoppa	1x	UEFA Cup	Edinson Cavani Gonzalo Higuaín	38 38
Total	Serie B (2)	470	189	168	113	566	434	632 (735)	1x Champ					Stefan Schwoch	26
Total	Serie C (3)	68	36	21	11	93	51	129	1x Champ					Emanuele Calaiò	19
