= List of AS Roma managers =

This is a complete list of managers of Italian club AS Roma.

== List ==
Manager	Seasons as Manager	Honours
(Italy) Gian Piero Gasperini	2025–26	-
(Italy) Claudio Ranieri (3)	2024–25	-
(Croatia) Ivan Jurić	2024–25	-
(Italy) Daniele De Rossi	2024–25; 2023–24	UEFA Europa League SF 2023–24
(Portugal) José Mourinho	2023–24; 2022–23; 2021–22	UEFA Europa Conference League Winners 2021–22; UEFA Europa League Runners-up 2022–23
(Portugal) Paulo Fonseca	2020–21; 2019–20	UEFA Europa League SF 2020–21
(Italy) Claudio Ranieri (2)	2018–19	-
(Italy) Eusebio Di Francesco	2018–19; 2017–18	UEFA Champions League SF 2017–18
(Italy) Luciano Spalletti (2)	2016–17; 2015–16	Serie A Runners-up 2016–17
(France) Rudi Garcia	2015–16; 2014–15; 2013–14	Serie A Runners-up 2013–14; Serie A Runners-up 2014–15
(Italy) Aurelio Andreazzoli	2012–13	Coppa Italia Runners-up 2012–13
(Czech Republic) Zdeněk Zeman (2)	2012–13	-
(Spain) Luis Enrique	2011–12	-
(Italy) Vincenzo Montella	2010–11	-
(Italy) Claudio Ranieri	2010–11; 2009–10	Supercoppa Italiana Runners-up 2010; Serie A Runners-up 2009–10; Coppa Italia Runners-up 2009–10
(Italy) Luciano Spalletti	2009–10; 2008–09; 2007–08; 2006–07; 2005–06	Supercoppa Italiana Runners-up 2008; Coppa Italia Winners 2007–08; Serie A Runners-up 2007–08; Supercoppa Italiana Winners 2007; Coppa Italia Winners 2006–07; Serie A Runners-up 2006-07; Supercoppa Italiana Runners-up 2006; Serie A Runners-up 2005–06; Coppa Italia Runners-up 2005–06
(Italy) Bruno Conti	2004–05	Coppa Italia Runners-up 2004–05
(Italy) Luigi Delneri	2004–05	-
(Germany) Rudi Völler	2004–05	-
(Italy) Cesare Prandelli	2004–05	-
(Italy) Fabio Capello	2003–04; 2002–03; 2001–02; 2000–01; 1999–2000	Serie A Runners-up 2003–04; Coppa Italia Runners-up 2002–03; Serie A Runners-up 2001–02; Supercoppa Italiana Winners 2001; Serie A Winners 2000–01
(Czech Republic) Zdeněk Zeman (1)	1998–99; 1997–98	-
(Sweden) Nils Liedholm (4)	1996–97	-
(Argentina) Carlos Bianchi	1996–97	-
(Italy) Carlo Mazzone	1995–96; 1994–95; 1993–94	-
(Federal Republic of Yugoslavia) Vujadin Boškov	1992–93	Coppa Italia Runners-up 1992–93
(Italy) Ottavio Bianchi	1991–92; 1990–91	Supercoppa Italiana Runners-up 1991; Coppa Italia Winners 1990–91; UEFA Cup Runners-up 1990–91
(Italy) Luigi Radice	1989–90	-
(Sweden) Nils Liedholm (3)	1988–89; 1987–88	-
(Brazil) Angelo Benedicto Sormani	1986–87	-
(Sweden) Sven-Göran Eriksson	1985–86; 1984–85	Serie A Runners-up 1985–86; Coppa Italia Winners 1985–86
(Sweden) Nils Liedholm (2)	1983–84; 1982–83; 1981–82; 1980–81; 1979–80	European Cup Runners-up 1983-84; Serie A Runners-up 1983-84; Coppa Italia Winners 1983–84; Serie A Winners 1982–83; Serie A Runners-up 1980–81; Coppa Italia Winners 1980–81; Coppa Italia Winners 1979–80
(Italy) Ferruccio Valcareggi	1978–79	-
(Italy) Gustavo Giagnoni	1978–79; 1977–78	-
(Sweden) Nils Liedholm (1)	1976–77; 1975–76; 1974–75; 1973–74	-
(Italy) Manlio Scompigno	1973–74	-
(Italy) Antonio Trebicani	1972–73	-
(Argentina) Helenio Herrera (2)	1972–73; 1971–72	Anglo-Italian Cup Winners 1972
(Italy) Luciano Tessari	1970–71	-
(Argentina) Helenio Herrera (1)	1970–71; 1969–70; 1968–69	Coppa Italia Winners 1968–69
(Italy) Oronzo Pugliese	1967–68; 1966–67; 1965–66	-
(Argentina) Juan Carlos Lorenzo	1964–65	-
(Spain) Luis Miró	1963–64	Coppa Italia Winners 1963–64
(Albania) Naim Krieziu	1963–64	-
(Italy) Alfredo Foni (2)	1963–64; 1962–63	-
(Argentina) Luis Carniglia	1962–63; 1961–62	-
(Italy) Alfredo Foni (1)	1960–61; 1959–60	Inter-Cities Fairs Cup Winners 1960–61
(Hungary) György Sarosi (2)	1958–59	-
(Sweden) Gunnar Nordahl	1958–59; 1957–58	-
(England) Alec Stock	1957–58	-
(Italy) Guido Masetti (2)	1956–57	-
(Hungary) György Sarosi (1)	1956–57; 1955–56	-
(England) Jasse Carver	1955–56; 1954–55; 1953–54	Serie A Runners-up 1954–55
(Italy) Mario Varglien	1953–54; 1952–53	-
(Italy) Giuseppe Viani	1951–52	-
(Italy) Guido Masetti (1)	1950–51	-
(Italy) Pietro Serantoni	1950–51	-
(Italy) Adolfo Baloncieri	1950–51	-
(Italy) Luigi Brunella (2)	1949–50	-
(Italy) Fulvio Bernardini	1949–50	-
(Italy) Luigi Brunella (1)	1948–49; 1947–48	-
(Hungary) Imre Senkey	1947-48	-
(Italy) Giovanni Degni	1946–47; 1945–46	-
(Italy) Guido Masetti	no official tournament	-
(Hungary) Géza Kertész	1942–43	-
(Hungary) Alfred Schaffer	1942–43; 1941–42; 1940–41; 1939–40	Serie A Winners 1941-42; Coppa Italia Runners-up 1940–41
(Italy) Guido Ara	1939–40; 1938–39; 1937–38	-
(Italy) Luigi Barbesino	1936–37; 1935–36; 1934–35; 1933–34	Coppa Italia Runners-up 1936–37; Serie A Runners-up 1935–36
(Hungary) Lajos Kovács	1932–33	-
(Austria) Janos Baar	1932–33; 1931–32	-
(England) Herbert Burgess	1931–32; 1930–31; 1929–30	Serie A Runners-up 1930–31
(Italy) Guido Baccani	1929–30	-
(England) William Garbutt	1928–29; 1927–28	-
