= Fosco =

Fosco may refer to:

- Fosco Becattini, an Italian football player and coach
- Fosco Maraini, an Italian photographer
- Fosco Giachetti, an Italian actor
- Fosco Risorti, a retired Italian professional football player
- Fosco Tricca, an Italian painter

== See also ==
- Foscoe, North Carolina
