= Omero =

Omero is an Italian given name whose English equivalent is Homer.

Omero may refer to:

- Omero Antonutti (1935-2019), Italian actor and dubber
- Omero Bonoli (1909–1985), Italian gymnast and 1932 Olympic pommel horse silver medalist
- Omero Carmellini (1921-1997), Italian retired footballer
- Omero Losi (1925-2012), Italian retired footballer
- Omero Tognon (1924–1990), Italian footballer

== See also ==
- Omeros, an epic poem by Nobel Prize-winning author Derek Walcott
