= Borsetti =

Borsetti is an Italian surname. Notable people with the surname include:

- Bartolomeo Carlo Borsetti (1689–c. 1759), Italian Baroque painter
- Ermes Borsetti (1913–2005), Italian footballer
- Pietro Borsetti (1882–1955), Italian gymnast
