= Spadoni =

Spadoni is an Italian surname. Notable people with the surname include:

- Eugenia Spadoni, later known as Mimì Aylmer (1896–1992), Italian actress
- Maria Edera Spadoni (born 1979), Italian politician
- Valerio Spadoni (born 1950), Italian footballer and coach
