= Tessari =

Tessari is an Italian surname. Notable people with the surname include:

- Daniele Tessari, Italian motorcycle speedway rider
- Duccio Tessari (1926–1994), Italian film director, screenwriter and actor
- Girolamo Tessari (c. 1480 – c. 1561), Italian Renaissance painter
- Luciano Tessari (born 1928), Italian footballer and manager
- Michael Tessari, Australian cinematographer of the 2022 film Monolith
