= Becatti =

Becatti is an Italian surname. Notable people with the surname include:

- Alessandra Becatti (born 1965), Italian heptathlete
- Giovanni Becatti (1912–1973), Italian art historian and archaeologist

== See also ==
- Becattini
