= Carmellini =

Carmellini is an Italian surname. Notable people with the surname include:

- Andrew Carmellini (born 1971), American chef and restaurateur
- Omero Carmellini (1921–1997), Italian footballer
- Tommy Carmellini, the hero of novels by Stephen Coonts
