= Joseph Bonomi =

Joseph Bonomi or Giuseppi Bonomi may mean either of a father-son pair notable in architecture and sculpture:

- Joseph Bonomi the Elder (1739–1808), Italian architect
- Joseph Bonomi the Younger (1796–1878), English sculptor and Egyptologist

== See also ==
- Giuseppe Bonomi (1913–1992), Italian football player and coach
