= Stucchi =

Stucchi may refer to:

- Stucchi (cycling team), an Italian professional cycling team
- Stucchi & Co., the later name (beginning in 1901) of Prinetti & Stucchi
- Giosuè Stucchi, former Italian professional football player

== See also ==
- Stussy and Cool S
