= Aldo Donati =

Aldo Donati may refer to:

- Aldo Donati (footballer)
- Aldo Donati (singer)
