= Santa Maria Assunta, Meina =

Church building in Meina, Italy

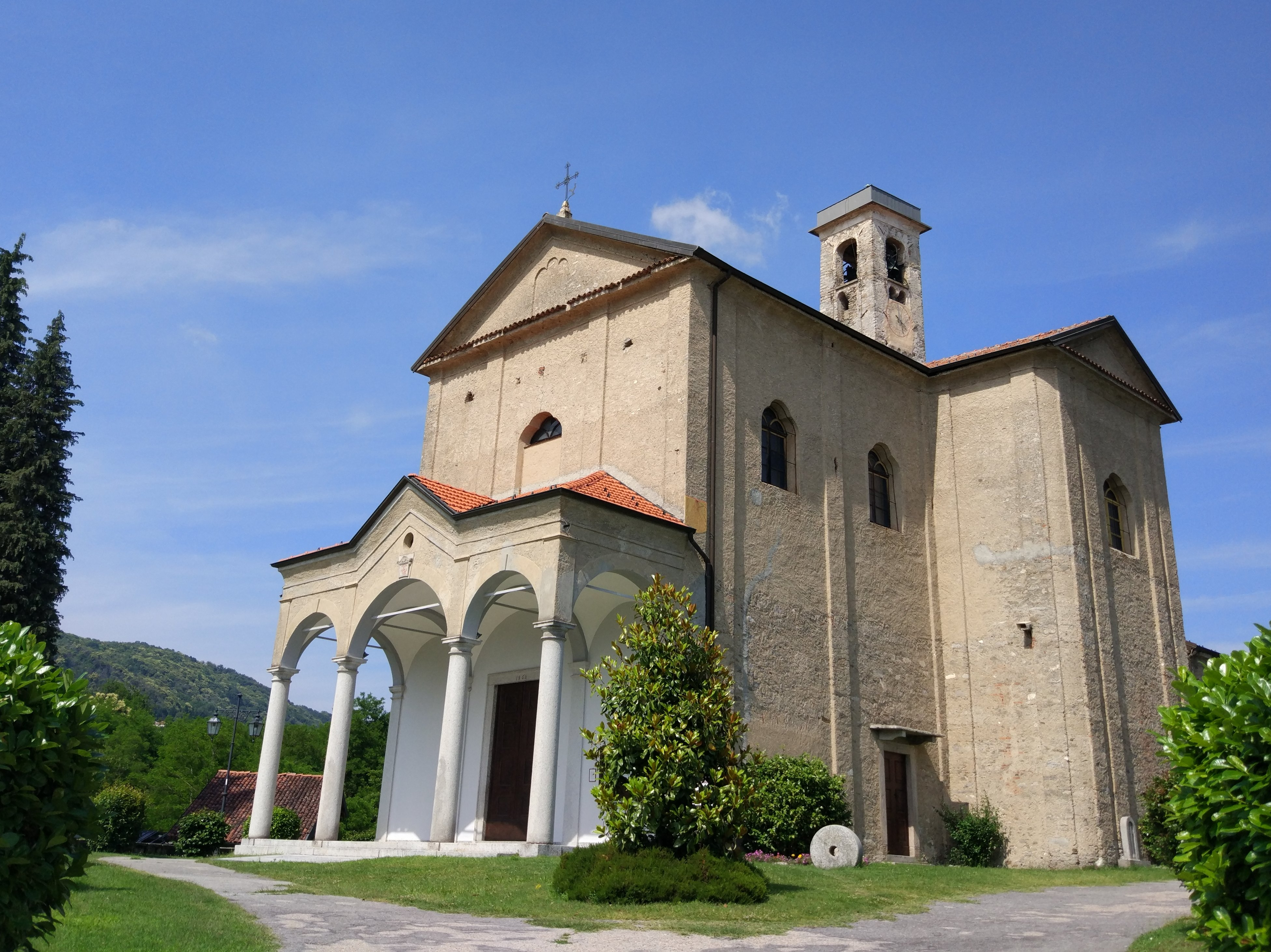

Santa Maria Assunta is an 18th-century Roman Catholic parish church in Via alla chiesa of the Frazione Ghevio outside the town of Meina, in the Province of Novara, region of Piedmont, Italy.

== History ==
The church stands atop a hill named Fortezza. While the church is from the 18th-century, the tall, slender, Romanesque-style stone bell-tower dates to the 11th century. The church ceiling was frescoed in 1740 by Carlo Borsetti. Other decorations were added in 1866 by Giovanni Francinetti. The main altar dates from 1777 and is surmounted by a 16th-century statue of the Virgin. The chapel of the Virgin of the Rosary has fifteen panels showing the Mysteries of the Rosary painted on copper (1663).
