= Sandro Puppo =

Italian footballer and manager

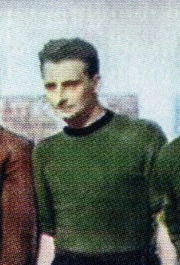
- Puppo with Venezia in 1941

Personal information
- Date of birth: 28 January 1918
- Place of birth: Piacenza, Italy
- Date of death: 16 October 1986 (aged 68)
- Place of death: Piacenza, Italy
- Height: 1.78 m (5 ft 10 in)
- Position: Midfielder

Senior career*
Years	Team	Apps	(Gls)
1934–1937	Piacenza	73	(7)
1937–1939	Ambrosiana	8	(0)
1939–1945	Venezia	126	(5)
1945–1946	Piacenza	22	(0)
1946–1947	Venezia	37	(0)
1947–1949	Roma	15	(0)
1949–1950	Thiene		

Managerial career
- 1952–1954: Turkey
- 1953–1954: Beşiktaş
- 1954–1955: Barcelona
- 1955–1957: Juventus
- 1960–1961: Beşiktaş
- 1960–1962: Turkey
- 1963–1964: Turkey
- 1965: Turkey
- 1965–1966: Turkey
Medal record
Italy
Men's Football
Gold medal – first place	1936 Berlin	Team competition
- * Club domestic league appearances and goals

Sandro Puppo (Italian pronunciation: [ˈsandro ˈpuppo]; 28 January 1918 – 16 October 1986) was an Italian football manager and former player who played as a midfielder.

== Club career ==
During his playing days, Puppo played for Italian clubs Piacenza, Ambrosiana, Venezia and Roma in the 1930s and 1940s. He won a Serie A title with Ambrosiana in 1937–38 (without playing, however), and two Coppa Italia titles with Ambrosiana and Venezia in 1938–39 and 1940–41 respectively.

== International career ==
At international level, Puppo was a member of the Italy national football team that won a gold medal at the 1936 Summer Olympic football tournament.

== Managerial career ==
Later Puppo became a coach and managed the Turkey national football team in the 1954 FIFA World Cup (becoming the first Italian coach ever to do so, 71 years before Vincenzo Montella), and went on to manage teams such as Barcelona, Juventus and Beşiktaş.

== Honours ==
=== Club ===
Ambrosiana-Inter

- Serie A: 1937–38
- Coppa Italia: 1938–39

Venezia:

- Coppa Italia: 1940–41

=== International ===
Italy

- Olympic Gold Medal: 1936

=== Manager ===
Beşiktaş

- Istanbul Football League: 1953–54
