= 1937–38 Coppa Italia =

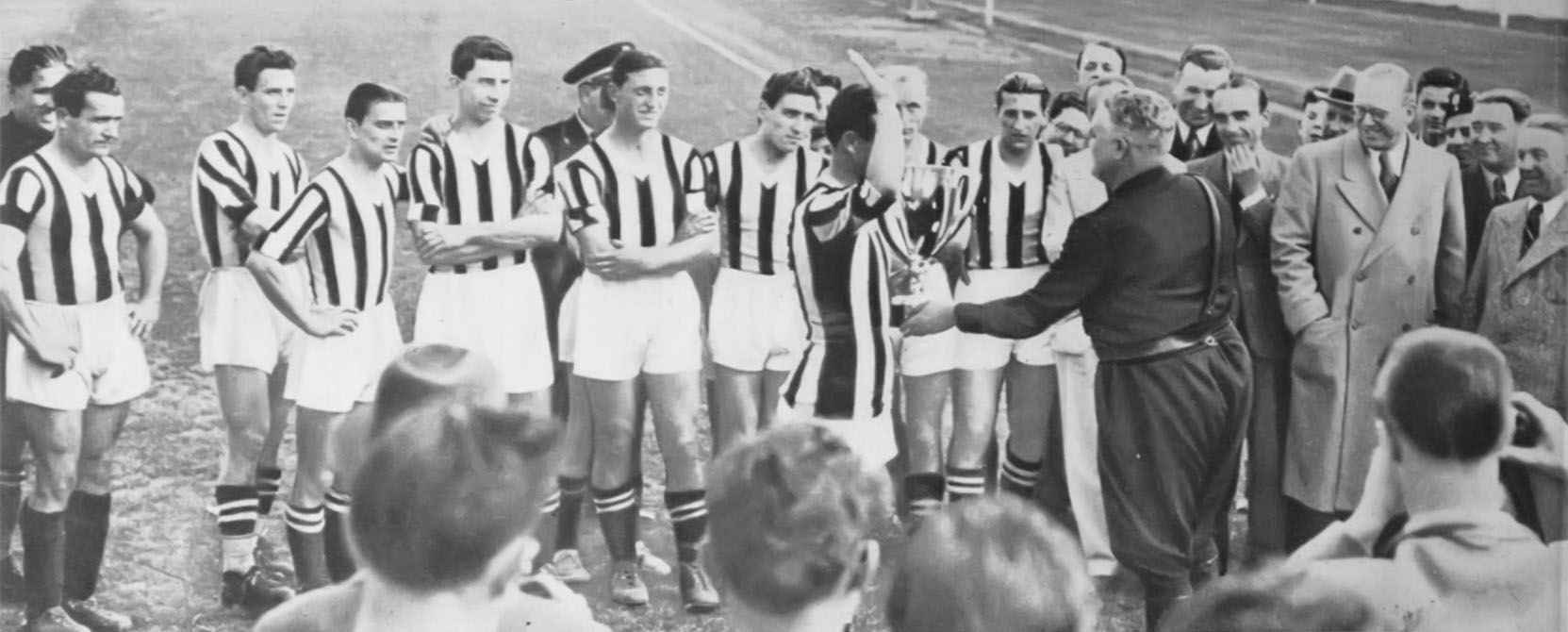
- Juventus receives its first Coppa Italia

Tournament details
- Country: Italy
- Dates: 5 Sept 1937 – 8 May 1938
- Teams: 113

Final positions
- Champions: Juventus (1st title)
- Runners-up: Torino

Tournament statistics
- Matches played: 122
- Goals scored: 461 (3.78 per match)
- Top goal scorer(s): Giuseppe Meazza (8 goals)

The 1937–38 Coppa Italia was the fifth edition of the national cup in Italian football and the third edition of the tournament organized by the Direttorio Divisioni Superiori. The competition was won by Juventus.

The two finalists, Torino and Juventus, were both from Turin. A two-legged final was agreed upon, given that both teams had their own stadiums, to avoid either team having an advantage.

== Qualifying round ==
Serie C qualifying and preliminary rounds were under geographical zones.

| Home team | Score | Away team |
|---|---|---|
| Acqui | 1–0 | Simaz Popoli |
| Casale | 5–2 | Derthona |
| Civitavecchia | 1–2 | MATER |
| Cusiana | 4–2 | Gallaratese |
| Fanfulla | 1–0 | Alfa Romeo |
| Fiumana | 3–0 | Grion Pola |
| Grosseto | 3–3 (aet) | Siena |
| Lecco | 1–0 | Isotta Fraschini |
| Mantova | 1–2 | Audace |
| Pavese | 3–4 | Vigevano |
| Piacenza | 2–1 | Galbani |
| Pontedera | 4–2 | SAFFA Fucecchio |
| Potenza | 2–0 | Manfredonia |
| Ravenna | 4–2 | Alma Juventus Fano |
| Rovigo | 2–0 | Forlimpopoli |
| Savona | 3–1 | Pontedecimo |

Replay match

| Home team | Score | Away team |
|---|---|---|
| Siena | 1–0 | Grosseto |

== 1st preliminary round ==
46 clubs are added.

| Home team | Score | Away team |
|---|---|---|
| Acqui | 3–2 | Pinerolo |
| Asti | 3–0 | Cusiana |
| Audace | 2–1 | Rovigo |
| Ilva Bagnolese | 4–4 (aet) | L'Aquila |
| Biellese | 4–2 | Casale |
| Cagliari | 1–1 (aet) | MATER |
| Manlio Cavagnaro | 1–2 | Savona |
| Cosenza | 0–2 | Salernitana |
| Fiumana | 2–3 | Ampelea Isola |
| Forlì | 1–1 (aet) | Carpi |
| Imperia | 1–2 | Andrea Doria |
| Catanzarese | 0–2 (Note: Federal decision) | Catania |
| Lecce | 2–1 | Stabia |
| Legnano | 1–2 | SIAI Sesto Calende |
| Marzotto Valdagno | 3–0 | Udinese |
| Parma | 0–2 | Piacenza |
| Ponziana | 3–0 | Pro Gorizia |
| Piombino | 2–0 | Vezio Parducci Viareggio |
| Pistoiese | 2–0 | Empoli |
| Potenza | 3–2 | Foggia |
| Prato | 3–0 | Siena |
| Pro Patria | 4–2 | Monza |
| Ravenna | 3–2 | Jesi |
| Reggiana | 1–0 | Fanfulla |
| Libertas Rimini | 3–1 | Macerata |
| Seregno | 3–1 | Falck |
| Signe | 1–2 | Pontedera |
| SPAL | 3–1 | Baracca Lugo |
| Vado | 2–0 | Entella |
| Varese | 2–1 | Crema |
| Vicenza | 2–0 | Treviso |
| Vigevano | 5–3 | Lecco |

Replay matches

| Home team | Score | Away team |
|---|---|---|
| L'Aquila | 3–0 | Ilva Bagnolese |
| MATER | 4–0 | Cagliari |
| Carpi | 3–0 | Forlì |

== 2nd Preliminary Round ==
Vigevano from Serie B are added.

| Home team | Score | Away team |
|---|---|---|
| Ampelea Isola | 0–2 | Ponziana |
| L'Aquila | 1–0 | MATER |
| Asti | 2–4 | Acqui |
| Biellese | 3–1 | Andrea Doria |
| Carpi | 0–1 | Reggiana |
| Catania | 3–1 | Potenza |
| Piacenza | 0–1 | SIAI Marchetti |
| Pontedera | 4–3 | Empoli |
| Prato | 4–1 | Piombino |
| Pro Patria | 4–0 | Seregno |
| Libertas Rimini | 5–2 | Ravenna |
| Salernitana | 2–0 | Lecce |
| Savona | 3–2 | Vado |
| SPAL | 3–1 | Marzotto Valdagno |
| Vicenza | 2–1 | Audace |
| Vigevano | 2–3 | Varese |

== 3rd Preliminary Round ==
16 Serie B clubs are added (Venezia, Anconitana, Messina, Brescia, Modena, Novara, Pisa, Pro Vercelli, Alessandria, Taranto, Padova, Spezia, Sanremese, Palermo, Cremonese, Hellas Verona).

| Home team | Score | Away team |
|---|---|---|
| Venezia | 3–1 | Ponziana |
| Anconitana-Bianchi | 3–0 | Messina |
| Biellese | 0–4 | Brescia |
| Modena | 8–0 | Libertas Rimini |
| Novara | 6–1 | Pro Patria |
| Pontedera | 4–3 | Pisa |
| Prato | 1–3 | L'Aquila |
| Pro Vercelli | 1–2 | Alessandria |
| Salernitana | 2–2 (aet) | Taranto |
| Savona | 5–2 | Acqui |
| SIAI Marchetti | 2–1 | Reggiana |
| SPAL | 1–0 | Padova |
| Spezia | 2–1 | Sanremese |
| Palermo | 4–1 | Catania |
| Varese | 4–2 | Cremonese |
| Vicenza | 2–0 | Hellas Verona |

Replay match

| Home team | Score | Away team |
|---|---|---|
| Taranto | 3–0 | Salernitana |

== First Round ==
16 Serie A clubs are added (Triestina, Ambrosiana-Inter, Bari, Atalanta, Livorno, Bologna, Juventus, Lazio, Liguria, Fiorentina, Roma, Genova 1893, Lucchese, Torino, Napoli, Milano).

| Home team | Score | Away team |
|---|---|---|
| Venezia | 2–1 | Triestina |
| Ambrosiana-Inter | 5–2 | Vicenza |
| Anconitana-Bianchi | 3–5 | Bari |
| Atalanta | 3–0 | Livorno |
| Bologna | 4–1 | Taranto |
| Juventus | 4–1 | L'Aquila |
| Lazio | 0–1 | Brescia |
| Liguria | 1–1 (aet) | Fiorentina |
| Modena | 2–3 | SIAI Marchetti |
| Novara | 1–1 (aet) | Alessandria |
| Pontedera | 1–3 | Roma |
| Savona | 2–3 | Genova 1893 |
| SPAL | 1–0 | Lucchese |
| Spezia | 2–4 | Torino |
| Napoli | 2–0 | Palermo |
| Varese | 0–2 | Milano |

Replay matches

| Home team | Score | Away team |
|---|---|---|
| Fiorentina | 2–3 | Liguria |
| Alessandria | 2–0 | Novara |

== Second round ==
| Home team | Score | Away team |
|---|---|---|
| Venezia | 1–1 (aet) | Atalanta |
| Ambrosiana-Inter | 5–1 | Bari |
| Brescia | 3–1 | Genova 1893 |
| Bologna | 4–1 | SPAL |
| Juventus | 1–0 | Alessandria |
| Liguria | 0–0 (aet) | Milano |
| Napoli | 4–2 | Roma |
| SIAI Marchetti | 0–1 | Torino |

Replay matches

| Home team | Score | Away team |
|---|---|---|
| Atalanta | 2–1 | Venezia |
| Milano | 3–0 | Liguria |

== Quarter-finals ==
| Home team | Score | Away team |
|---|---|---|
| Milano | 2–0 | Bologna |
| Brescia | 2–6 | Torino |
| Juventus | 6–0 | Atalanta |
| Napoli | 0–2 | Ambrosiana-Inter |

== Semi-finals ==
| Home team | Score | Away team |
|---|---|---|
| Milano | 2–2 (aet) | Torino |
| Juventus | 2–0 | Ambrosiana-Inter |

Replay match

| Home team | Score | Away team |
|---|---|---|
| Torino | 3–2 | Milano |

== Final ==
=== First leg ===
1 May 1938
15:30

| Torino | 1–3 | Juventus |
|---|---|---|
| D'Odorico 35' | | Bellini 24' 85'; De Filippis 72' |

Stadio Filadelfia, Turin
Attendance: 14,957
Referee: Raffaele Mastellari

=== Second leg ===
8 May 1938
15:30

| Juventus | 2–1 | Torino |
|---|---|---|
| Gabetto 28' 38' | | Baldi III 20' |

Stadio Benito Mussolini, Turin
Attendance: 9,091
Referee: Raffaele Mastellari

Juventus won 5–2 on aggregate.

== Top goalscorers ==
| Rank | Player | Club | Goals |
|---|---|---|---|
| 1 | (Italy) Giuseppe Meazza | Ambrosiana-Inter | 8 |
| 2 | (Italy) Giovanni Moretti | Milano | 5 |
| 2 | (Italy) Luigi Uneddu | Vigevano | 5 |
| 2 | (Italy) Luigi Lessi | L'Aquila | 5 |
| 2 | (Italy) Nicola Bruscantini | Anconitana-Bianchi | 5 |
| 6 | (Italy) Felice Borel | Juventus | 4 |
| 6 | (Italy) Ettore Pesce | Acqui | 4 |
| 6 | (Italy) Vittorio Barberis | Pro Patria | 4 |
| 6 | (Italy) Eriberto Raffaini | Brescia | 4 |
