= Romolo Alzani =

Italian footballer (1921–2002)

Personal information
- Date of birth: 6 March 1921
- Place of birth: Rome, Italy
- Date of death: 3 October 2002 (aged 81)
- Height: 1.77 m (5 ft 9 1/2 in)
- Position: Midfielder

Senior career*
Years	Team	Apps	(Gls)
1938–1939	Roma	0	(0)
1939–1940	Rimini	24	(0)
1940–1941	Roma	1	(0)
1941–1943	Ala Littoria		
1943–1944	Tirrenia Roma	15	(2)
1945–1955	Lazio	263	(7)
1957–1958	Foligno		
- * Club domestic league appearances and goals

Romolo Alzani (born 6 March 1921 in Rome; died 3 October 2002) was a professional Italian footballer who played as a midfielder and centre-back.

He was the part of the defensive formation of S.S. Lazio for several years, that was called the "iron defense" ("la difesa di ferro").

Overall, he played for 10 seasons in the Serie A for A.S. Roma and Lazio, collecting 247 appearances and 6 goals.
