= Trentino Bui =

Italian footballer

Personal information
- Date of birth: 30 May 1915
- Place of birth: Pesaro, Kingdom of Italy
- Date of death: 14 October 1957 (aged 42)
- Position: Striker

Senior career*
Years	Team	Apps	(Gls)
1935–1938	Vis Pesaro		
1938–1939	Roma	0	(0)
1939–1940	Atalanta	27	(3)
1940–1941	Roma	1	(0)
1941–1942	Vis Pesaro	28	(11)
1942–1943	Fiorentina	8	(1)
1943–1944	Faenza	6	(1)
1945–1946	Legnano	11	(1)
1946–1947	Mestrina	7	(0)
1947–1948	Abbiategrasso		
- * Club domestic league appearances and goals

Trentino Bui (born 30 May 1915 – 14 October 1957) was an Italian professional football player. He was born in Pesaro.

Bui played for 2 seasons (9 games, 1 goal) in the Serie A for A.S. Roma and ACF Fiorentina.

== Career ==
Trentino was raised in Vis Pesaro, where he made his debut as a football player in the team of his city. He was bought by Roma in the 1938-39 season. The championship proved to be unlucky, so much that he was sent to Atalanta.

With the Bergamo team he played a great season. He then returned to Roma, where he was unable to break through because of the competition from other players, being sold to Vis Pesaro. In Serie C with the team where he had grown up he managed to re-propose himself, and was later bought by Fiorentina. However, he was unable to establish himself in Florence either, moving to Legnano and Mestrina (Serie B), then concluding his career at Abbiategrasso (Serie C).
