= Pietro Acquarone =

Italian footballer

Personal information
- Date of birth: 23 January 1917
- Place of birth: Taggia, Italy
- Date of death: 1 May 1993 (aged 76)
- Place of death: Sanremo, Italy
- Position: Midfielder

Senior career*
Years	Team	Apps	(Gls)
1937–1940	Sanremese	48	(7)
1940–1941	Roma	5	(0)
1941–1943	Pisa	65	(2)
1943–1944	Asti	18	(0)
1946–1949	Sanremese		
- * Club domestic league appearances and goals

Pietro Acquarone (23 January 1917 in Taggia – 1 May 1993 in Sanremo) was a professional Italian football player.

He played 5 games in the 1940/41 season in the Serie A for A.S. Roma.
