= Omero Losi =

Italian footballer

Personal information
- Date of birth: February 23, 1925
- Place of birth: Moglia, Italy
- Date of death: November 25, 2012 (aged 87)
- Place of death: Carpi, Emilia-Romagna, Italy
- Position: Striker

Senior career*
Years	Team	Apps	(Gls)
1945–1946	Reggiana	26	(8)
1946–1949	Roma	79	(15)
1949–1951	Modena	24	(3)
- * Club domestic league appearances and goals

Omero Losi (February 23, 1925 in Moglia – 25 November 2012 in Carpi) was an Italian professional football player.

He played for 3 seasons (79 games, 15 goals) in the Serie A for A.S. Roma.
