= 1940–41 Coppa Italia =

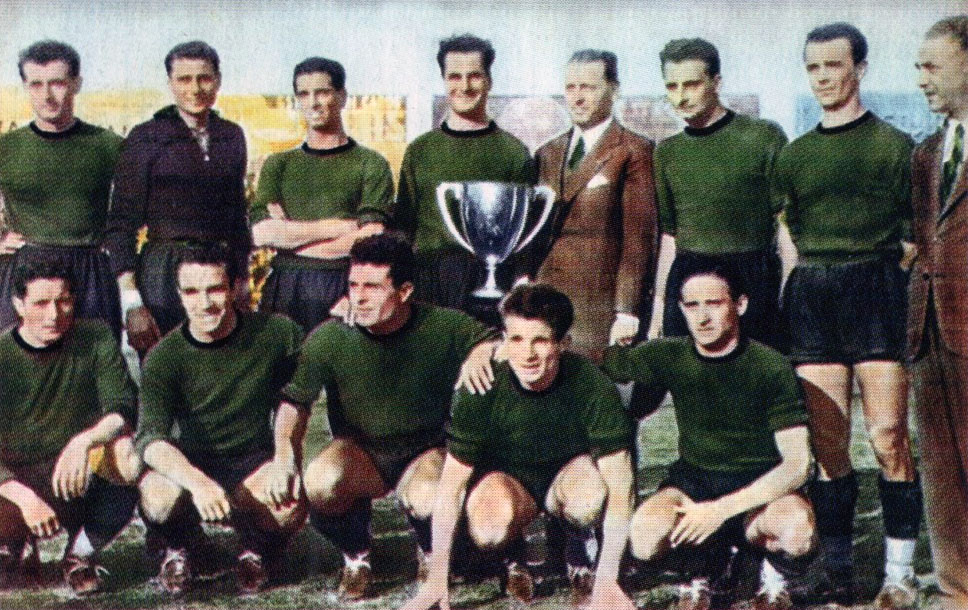
- Venezia poses with the trophy

Tournament details
- Country: Italy
- Dates: 22 Sept 1940 – 15 June 1941
- Teams: 158

Final positions
- Champions: Venezia (1st title)
- Runners-up: Roma

Tournament statistics
- Matches played: 165
- Goals scored: 610 (3.7 per match)
- Top goal scorer(s): Giuseppe Ostromann; Amedeo Amadei (7 goals)

The 1940–41 Coppa Italia was the eighth Coppa Italia, the major Italian domestic cup. The competition was won by Venezia.

== Serie C elimination round ==
Home team	Score	Away team
Grion Pola	2-1	Ampelea Isola
Mestre	2-1	San Donà
Ponziana	1-2	Fiumana
Treviso	2-0	Belluno
Pro Gorizia	3-0	Pieris
Ferrara	0-4	Rovigo
Falck	0-0 (aet)	Alfa Romeo
Lanerossi Schio	0-1	Marzotto Valdagno
Audace	1-2	Mantova
Pro Ponte	2-3	Casalini
Parma	3-1	Corradini Suzzara
Cremonese	1-0	Redaelli
Pro Palazzolo	8-1	Monza
Crema	1-0	Piacenza
Vigevano	0-2	Pirelli
Juventus Domo	4-2	Cusiana
Legnano	1-3	Meda
Lecco	2-1	Cantù
Biellese	1-1 (aet)	Casale
Pro Patria	1-0	Pavese
Seregno	1-0	Varese
Gallaratese	2-0	Galliate
Caratese	0-1	Como
Cuneo	3-1	Varazze
Vado	0-2	Acqui
Rapallo	4-0	Littorio Rivarolo
Sanremese	1-0	Albenga
Asti	3-2	Pinerolo
Prato	7-1	Montevarchi Calcio Aquila
Saviglianese	2-3	Valpolcevera
Carrarese	4-0	Cecina
Pontedera	4-1	Aullese
Italo Gambacciani	4-1	Forte dei Marmi
Taranto	4-2	Cosenza
Signe	5-2	San Giovanni Valdarno
Arezzo	6-0	Tiferno
Forlì	2-0	Ravenna
Molinella	4-0	Imolese
Baracca Lugo	2-3	Forlimpopoli
Pescara	3-0	Lanciano
Interamnia Teramo	3-1	Chieti
Perugia	4-0	L'Aquila
MU Borzacchini	4-2 (aet)	Alba Motor
Vis Pesaro	7-1	Gubbio
Libertas Rimini	7-0	Ascoli
MATER	2-0	Civitavecchia
Supertessile Rieti	6-1	Aeronautica Umbra
Sambenedettese	1-0	Alma Juventus Fano
Salernitana	4-1	Stabia
Foggia	1-0	Armando Diaz
Ilva Bagnolese	5-0	Sora
Trani	1-3	Molfetta
Lecce	1-0	Brindisi
Cavese	2-1	Savoia
Catania	0-2	Siracusa
Amatori Bologna	-	Pistoiese
Manlio Cavagnaro	-	Entella
Potenza	-	Pro Italia Taranto

Replay matches

Home team	Score	Away team
Alfa Romeo	2-0	Falck
Casale	2-1	Biellese

== First round ==
Six clubs were added (Monfalcone, Ilva Savona, Carpi, Battipaglia, Juventina Palermo, and Messina).

Home team	Score	Away team
Pro Gorizia	0-0 (aet)	Monfalcone
Grion Pola	0-1	Fiumana
Mantova	1-3	Casalini
Mestre	1-2	Marzotto Valdagno
Rovigo	3-2	Treviso
Parma	2-1	Cremonese
Gallaratese	0-0 (aet)	Casale
Pro Palazzolo	2-3	Pirelli
Meda	2-4	Juventus Domo
Pro Patria	2-0	Seregno
Crema	1-0	Alfa Romeo
Rapallo	1-2	Sanremese
Lecco	1-0	Como
Manlio Cavagnaro	3-1	Cuneo
Carpi	0-1	Amatori Bologna
Acqui	1-0	Asti
Valpolcevera	4-2	Ilva Savona
Arezzo	4-2	Pontedera
Prato	5-2	Italo Gambacciani
Signe	4-3	Carrarese
Forlimpopoli	1-3	Libertas Rimini
Pescara	2-0	Interamnia Teramo
Vis Pesaro	4-0	Sambenedettese
Forlì	4-1	Molinella
Perugia	5-1	MATER
MU Borzacchini	1-0	Supertessile Rieti
Savoia	0-1	Salernitana
Potenza	1-2	Foggia
Battipaglia	2-1	Ilva Bagnolese
Molfetta	5-1	Lecce
Taranto	3-0	Siracusa
Juventina Palermo	2-0	Messina

Replay matches

Home team	Score	Away team
Monfalcone	4-2	Pro Gorizia
Casale	5-1 (aet)	Gallaratese

== Second round ==
Home team	Score	Away team
Pro Patria	3-2	Juventus Domo
Parma	2-1	Crema
Lecco	0-2	Casale
Manlio Cavagnaro	2-0	Valpolcevera
Marzotto Valdagno	3-1	Rovigo
Prato	0-1	Amatori Bologna
Salernitana	4-0	Battipaglia
Sanremese	2-1	Acqui
Arezzo	5-2	Signe
Pescara	1-0	Vis Pesaro
Forlì	3-2	Libertas Rimini
MU Borzacchini	3-2	Perugia
Molfetta	2-1	Foggia
Fiumana	4-0	Monfalcone
Pirelli	3-2	Casalini
Taranto	0-1	Juventina Palermo

== Serie B elimination round ==
Home team	Score	Away team
Reggiana	2-3 (aet)	Fanfulla
Liguria	3-0	Pro Vercelli

== Third round ==
16 Serie B clubs were added (Modena, Anconitana-Bianchi, Brescia, Alessandria, Fanfulla, Lucchese, Hellas Verona, Vicenza, Macerata, Siena, Padova, Udinese, Savona, Spezia, Pisa, and Liguria).

Home team	Score	Away team
Casale	4-0	Modena
Anconitana-Bianchi	8-1	Molfetta
Brescia	3-1	Alessandria
Forlì	2-3	Fanfulla
Lucchese	6-2	Manlio Cavagnaro
Hellas Verona	3-1	Vicenza
Fiumana	3-1	Pirelli
Macerata	1-2	Siena
Padova	6-1	Marzotto Valdagno
Pro Patria	5-0	Amatori Bologna
Salernitana	3-0	Pescara
Liguria	7-0	Sanremese
MU Borzacchini	4-1	Juventina Palermo
Udinese	4-1	Parma
Spezia	4-3	Pisa
Savona	3-0	Arezzo

== Round of 32 ==
16 Serie A clubs were added (Ambrosiana-Inter, Juventus, Atalanta, Milano, Fiorentina, Genova 1893, Livorno, Roma, Torino, Napoli, Triestina, Lazio, Venezia, Bologna, Bari, and Novara).

Home team	Score	Away team
Ambrosiana-Inter	0-2	Juventus
Atalanta	2-2 (aet)	Brescia
Casale	1-5	Milano
Fiorentina	1-0	Liguria
Fiumana	2-1	Genova 1893
Livorno	2-0	Savona
Padova	6-1	Salernitana
Roma	6-1	Fanfulla
Pro Patria	0-1	Lucchese
Spezia	1-0	Anconitana-Bianchi
Torino	1-1 (aet)	Napoli
Siena	0-0 (aet)	Bologna
Triestina	1-2	Lazio
Udinese	4-0	Hellas Verona
Venezia	3-0	MU Borzacchini
Bari	-	Novara

Replay matches

Home team	Score	Away team
Brescia	4-2	Atalanta
Napoli	1-2	Torino
Bologna	6-3	Siena

== Round of 16 ==
Home team	Score	Away team
Fiumana	0-1 (aet)	Spezia
Fiorentina	5-3	Juventus
Venezia	5-0	Udinese
Lucchese	1-3	Padova
Torino	5-2	Brescia
Roma	2-2 (aet)	Novara
Milano	0-2	Lazio
Bologna	3-1 (aet)	Livorno

Replay match

Home team	Score	Away team
Novara	0-2	Roma

== Quarter-finals ==
Home team	Score	Away team
Roma	4-1	Fiorentina
Bologna	3-4	Venezia
Padova	1-3	Torino
Spezia	2-5	Lazio

== Semi-finals ==
Home team	Score	Away team
Venezia	3-1	Lazio
Torino	1-1 (aet)	Roma

Replay match

Home team	Score	Away team
Roma	1-0	Torino

== Final ==
=== First leg ===
8 June 1941

Roma	3–3	Venezia
Amadei 14', 16', 19'		Mazzola 37'; Diotalevi 64'; Alberti 68'

Stadio Nazionale, Rome
Referee: Renzo Curradi

=== Second leg ===
15 June 1941

Venezia	1–0	Roma
Loik 73'

Stadio Pier Luigi Penzo, Venice
Referee: Raffaele Scorzoni

Venezia won 4–3 on aggregate.

== Top goalscorers ==
Rank	Player	Club	Goals
1	(Italy) Giuseppe Ostromann	Ternana	7
1	(Italy) Amedeo Amadei	Roma	7
3	(Italy) Bruno Quaresima	Fiumana	6
3	(Italy) Leonardo Gambaro	Arezzo	6
3	(Italy) Luigi Torti	Anconitana-Bianchi	6
6	(Albania) Naim Kryeziu	Roma	5
6	(Italy) Ettore Puricelli	Bologna	5
6	(Italy) Francesco Jacobbe	Molfetta	5
6	(Italy) Antonio Bacin	Taranto	5
