= Amedeo Rega =

Italian footballer (1920-2007)

Personal information
- Date of birth: January 31, 1920
- Place of birth: Rome, Italy
- Date of death: 2007
- Place of death: Rome, Italy
- Position: Goalkeeper

Senior career*
Years	Team	Apps	(Gls)
1940–1941	Roma	1	(0)
1943–1945	Lazio		
1945–1946	Perugia		
1946–1947	Salernitana	22	
1948–1949	Catania		
- * Club domestic league appearances and goals

Amedeo Rega (January 31, 1920 – 2007 in Rome) was an Italian professional football player.

His professional debut in the 1940/41 season for A.S. Roma remained the only Serie A game in his career.
