= Erminio Asin =

Italian footballer (born 1914)

Personal information
- Date of birth: 27 March 1914
- Place of birth: Venice, Italy
- Date of death: 6 January 1986 (aged 71)
- Position: Defender

Senior career*
Years	Team	Apps	(Gls)
1936–1937	Ponziana Trieste		
1937–1939	Roma	7	(0)
1939–1940	Lucchese	34	(1)
1940–1941	Roma	2	(0)
- * Club domestic league appearances and goals

Erminio Asin (27 March 1914 – 6 January 1986) was an Italian footballer.

He played for three seasons (nine matches, no goals) in the Serie A for A.S. Roma.
