= Ippolito Ippoliti =

Italian footballer (1921–1966)

Personal information
- Date of birth: April 2, 1921
- Place of birth: Rome, Italy
- Date of death: 30 November 1966 (aged 45)
- Place of death: Rome, Italy
- Height: 1.70 m (5 ft 7 in)
- Position: Goalkeeper

Senior career*
Years	Team	Apps	(Gls)
1939–1943	Roma	16	(0)
1943–1944	Juventus Roma		
1944–1945	Roma	1	(0)
1945–1948	Rieti		
- * Club domestic league appearances and goals

Ippolito Ippoliti (April 2, 1921 in Rome - November 30, 1966 Rome) was an Italian professional football player.

He played for 2 seasons (16 games) in the Serie A for A.S. Roma.
