= Edmondo Mornese =

Italian footballer (1910–1962

Personal information
- Date of birth: 14 November 1910
- Place of birth: Alessandria, Italy
- Date of death: 30 December 1962 (aged 52)
- Height: 1.77 m (5 ft 9 1/2 in)
- Position: Midfielder

Senior career*
Years	Team	Apps	(Gls)
1929–1941	Novara	335	(11)
1941–1944	Roma	61	(3)
1944–1945	Italia Libera		
- * Club domestic league appearances and goals

Edmondo Mornese (14 November 1910 – 30 December 1962) was an Italian professional football player.

He played for six seasons in the Serie A for Novara Calcio and A.S. Roma.

== Honours ==
- Serie A champion: 1941/42
