= Bartolomeo Carlo Borsetti =

Italian painter

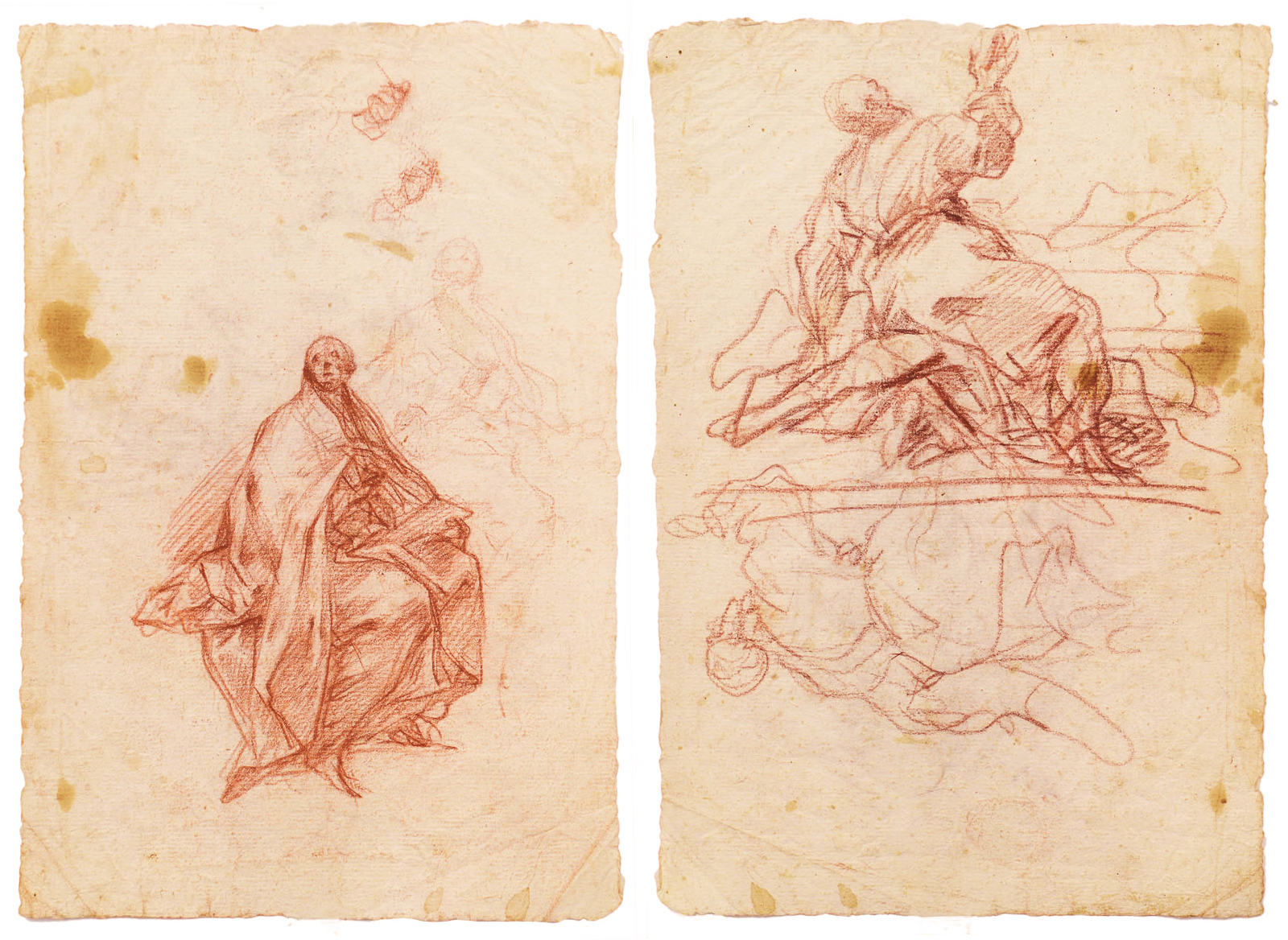
Preparatory sketch by Carlo Bartolomeo Borsetti

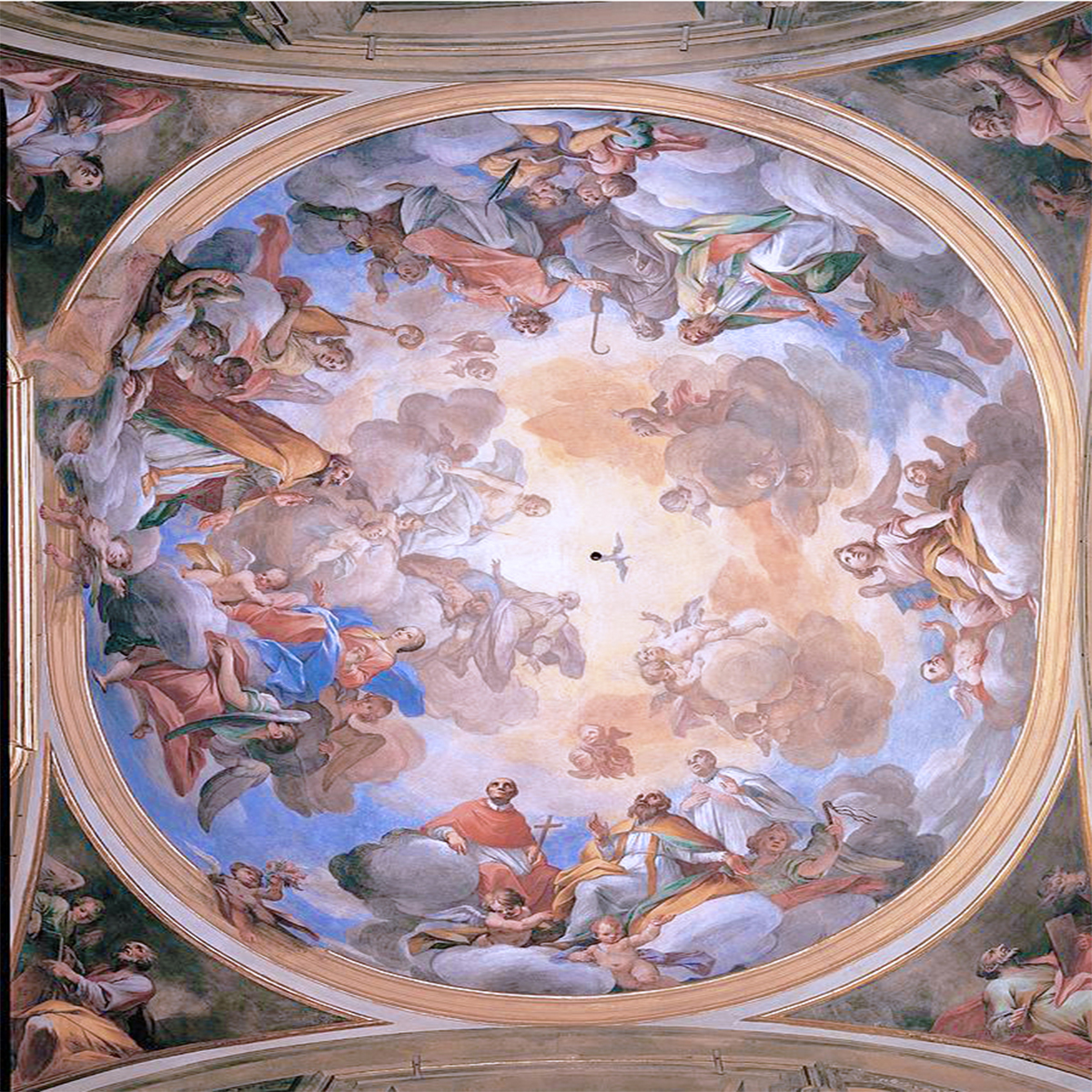
Fresco of The Glory of St. Gaudentius by Carlo Bartolomeo Borsetti, Varallo, 1746

Bartolomeo Carlo Borsetti (1689 – c. 1759) was an Italian painter of the late Baroque period, active in the Piedmont.

He was born in Boccioleto and was the pupil of the Flemish painter Giovanni Antonio de Grott, who lived and worked at Varallo. and painted for the arch (Porta Aurea) of the 19th chapel at the Sacro Monte of Varallo. He frescoed the ceiling in the church of Santa Maria Assunta, Meina.
