= Mario De Grassi (footballer, born 1919) =

Italian footballer

Personal information
- Date of birth: January 22, 1919
- Place of birth: Livorno, Italy
- Height: 1.68 m (5 ft 6 in)
- Position: Midfielder

Senior career*
| Years | Team | Apps | (Gls) |
| 1936–1937 | Monfalcone | | |
| 1937–1943 | Roma | 37 | (3) |
| 1943–1944 | Monfalcone | 12 | (0) |
| 1945–1946 | Ternana | 8 | (0) |
| 1946–1950 | Siena | 143 | (5) |
- * Club domestic league appearances and goals

Mario De Grassi (born January 22, 1919) was an Italian professional football player.

He was born in Livorno, Italy, and played for 6 seasons (37 games, 3 goals) in the Serie A for A.S. Roma.

== Honours ==
- Serie A champion: 1941/42.
