= Giancarlo Vitali =

Italian footballer and manager (1926–2011)

Personal information
- Date of birth: 26 July 1926
- Place of birth: Medesano, Italy
- Date of death: 27 October 2011 (aged 85)
- Position: Right winger

Senior career*
Years	Team	Apps	(Gls)
1946–1947	Genoa		
1947–1950	Padova		
1950–1952	Fiorentina		
1952–1957	Napoli		
1957–1959	S.P.A.L.		
1959–1961	Pistoiese		
1961–1962	Pontedera		

Managerial career
- 1961–1962: Pontedera (player-manager)
- 1966–1967: Cosenza
- 1967–1968: Parma
- 1969–1970: Parma
- 1970–1971: Sorrento
- 1971–1972: Salernitana
- 1972–1973: Trapani
- 1973–1974: Pro Vasto
- 1974–1975: Paganese
- 1977–1980: Sorrento
- 1980–1981: Milazzo
- * Club domestic league appearances and goals

Giancarlo Vitali (21 July 1926 — 27 October 2011) was an Italian football winger and later manager.
