= Luigi Di Pasquale =

Italian footballer

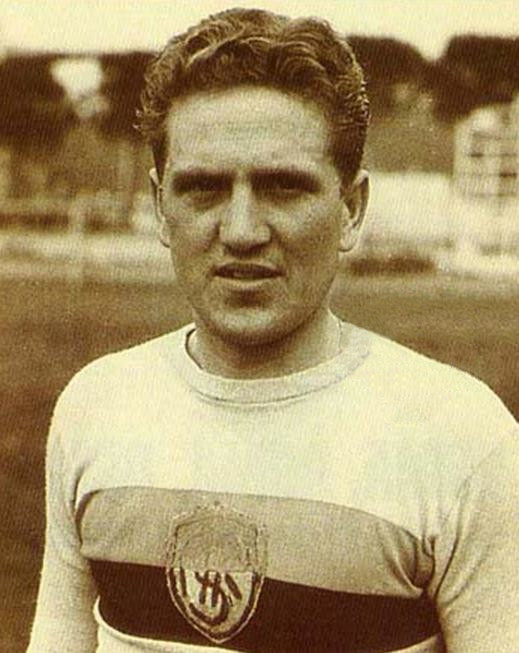

Personal information
- Date of birth: 12 June 1919
- Place of birth: Udine, Italy
- Height: 1.70 m (5 ft 7 in)
- Position: Striker

Senior career*
Years	Team	Apps	(Gls)
1936–1938	Udinese	46	(?)
1938–1943	Roma	17	(3)
1940–1941	→ Padova (loan)	24	(7)
1943–1944	Udinese	9	(0)
1945–1946	Roma	6	(1)
1946–1948	Cesena	61	(14)
- * Club domestic league appearances and goals

Luigi Di Pasquale (born 12 June 1919 in Udine) was an Italian professional football player.

He played for 3 seasons (17 games, 3 goals) in the Serie A for A.S. Roma.

== Honours ==
- Serie A champion: 1941/42
