= Sergio Andreoli =

Italian footballer

Personal information
- Date of birth: 3 May 1922
- Place of birth: Capranica, Italy
- Date of death: 18 May 2002 (aged 80)
- Place of death: Viterbo, Italy
- Height: 1.70 m (5 ft 7 in)
- Position: Defender

Senior career*
Years	Team	Apps	(Gls)
1938–1939	Perugia		
1939–1940	Dinasimaz Popoli		
1940–1941	Perugia		
1941–1950	Roma	229	(12)
1950–1951	Reggina		
1951–1953	Chinotto Neri		
- * Club domestic league appearances and goals

Sergio Andreoli (3 May 1922 – 18 May 2002) was an Italian footballer who played as a defender.

He played for 6 seasons (179 games, 9 games) in the Serie A for A.S. Roma.

He was Roma's captain from 1948 to 1950.

== Honours ==
Roma

- Serie A champion: 1941–42.
