= Luigi Nobile =

Italian footballer

Personal information
- Date of birth: 24 February 1921
- Place of birth: Rome, Italy
- Date of death: 18 February 2009 (aged 87)
- Height: 1.75 m (5 ft 9 in)
- Position: Defender

Senior career*
| Years | Team | Apps | (Gls) |
| 1939–1943 | Roma | 4 | (0) |
- * Club domestic league appearances and goals

Luigi Nobile (24 February 1921 – 18 February 2009) was an Italian professional football player. He was born in Rome.

He played 2 seasons (4 games) in the Serie A for A.S. Roma, winning the championship in the 1941/42 season.
