= Paolo Jacobini =

Italian footballer

Personal information
- Date of birth: 26 September 1919
- Place of birth: Rome, Kingdom of Italy
- Date of death: 2003 (aged 83–84)
- Position: Midfielder

Senior career*
Years	Team	Apps	(Gls)
1939–1948	Roma	142	(3)
1948–1949	Napoli	10	(0)
1950–1951	Latina		
1951–1952	Chinotto Neri		
- * Club domestic league appearances and goals

Paolo Jacobini (born 26 September 1919 in Rome – 2003) was an Italian professional football player.

He played for 6 seasons (97 games, 1 goal) in the Serie A for A.S. Roma.

== Honours ==
- Serie A champion: 1941/42.
