= Luciano Tessari =

Italian football player and manager (1928–2026)

Personal information
- Date of birth: 29 September 1928
- Place of birth: San Martino Buon Albergo, Italy
- Date of death: 10 November 2026 (aged 98)
- Position: Goalkeeper

Senior career*
Years	Team	Apps	(Gls)
1948–1950	Verona	26	(0)
1950–1951	Roma	23	(0)
1951–1952	Fiorentina	2	(0)
1952–1953	Roma	12	(0)
1953–1954	Palermo	22	(0)
1954–1958	Roma	24	(0)

Managerial career
- 1971: Roma
- 1973–1974: Latina
- 1978–1979: Pro Cisterna
- * Club domestic league appearances and goals

Luciano Tessari (29 September 1928 – 10 November 2026) was an Italian football player and manager from San Martino Buon Albergo in the Province of Verona.

A goalkeeper, Tessari is most noted for his career at Roma where he spent a considerable number of seasons. In 1970, he came back to the club as manager on an interim basis after club president got rid of Helenio Herrera.

His term of management was notable for losing the semi-final of the Cup Winners' Cup against Polish side Gornik Zabrze on a coin toss after a third deciding match ended in a draw after extra-time. Many Roma fans had celebrated victory well into the night after the second leg after mistakenly believing that away goals had counted double.

Tessari died on 10 November 2026, at the age of 98.
