= Aldo Donati (footballer) =

Italian footballer (1910-1984)

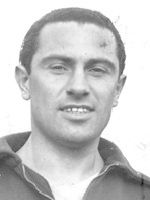

Personal information
- Full name: Aldo Donati
- Date of birth: 29 September 1910
- Place of birth: Bologna, Italy
- Date of death: 3 November 1984 (aged 74)
- Place of death: Rome, Italy
- Height: 1.68 m (5 ft 6 in)
- Position: Midfielder

Senior career*
Years	Team	Apps	(Gls)
1929–37	Bologna	62	(0)
1937–43	Roma	139	(4)
1945–46	Inter	2	(0)
Total		203	(4)

International career
1938	Italy	0	(0)
Medal record
Italy
FIFA World Cup
Gold medal – first place	1938 France
- * Club domestic league appearances and goals

Aldo Donati (29 September 1910 – 3 November 1984) was an Italian footballer who played as a midfielder.

== Club career ==
Born in Bologna, he played in the 1930s for Bologna and Roma. He played 201 matches in Serie A and scored 4 goals. He debuted in Serie A at 19 years of age and played for eight seasons for Bologna, winning the scudetto in 1936 and 1937, as well as the Mitropa Cup. The following year he was acquired by Roma where he played seven seasons. In 1942 he won his third scudetto (Roma's first) before retiring. After the Second World War, he later also played a season with Inter between 1945–46.

== International career ==
For the Italy national football team he was selected to the 1938 FIFA World Cup-winning squad as a reserve player, although he never made his debut for Italy.

== Honours ==
=== Club ===
Bologna

- Serie A: 1935–36, 1936–37
- Mitropa Cup: 1932, 1934

Roma

- Serie A: 1941–42

=== International ===
Italy

- FIFA World Cup: 1938
