= 1942–43 Serie B =

Italian football league season

Serie B
- Season: 1942–43
- Champions: Modena; 1st title

Serie B 1942-43 team distribution

The Serie B 1942–43 was the fourteenth tournament of this competition played in Italy since its creation.

== Teams ==
Cremonese, Anconitana, M.A.T.E.R. and Palermo had been promoted from Serie C, while Napoli and Modena had been relegated from Serie A.

== Events ==
Goal average was abolished.

This was the last championship before a two-year break due to World War II.

== Final classification ==
Pos	Team	Pld	W	D	L	GF	GA	GR	Pts	Promotion or relegation
1	Modena (P, C)	32	19	7	6	65	31	2.097	45	Promotion to Serie A
2	Brescia (P)	32	18	7	7	53	30	1.767	43	Promotion to Serie A
3	Napoli	32	16	9	7	46	27	1.704	41	
4	Pro Patria	32	13	11	8	39	25	1.560	37	
4	Pisa (B)	32	15	7	10	45	37	1.216	37	Back to B in 1946
6	Spezia	32	12	11	9	55	34	1.618	35	
7	Cremonese	32	13	6	13	38	39	0.974	32	
8	Fanfulla	32	12	7	13	60	46	1.304	31	
8	Pescara	32	11	9	12	44	50	0.880	31	
10	Padova	32	12	6	14	48	42	1.143	30	
10	Anconitana	32	12	6	14	45	58	0.776	30	
12	Alessandria	32	11	6	15	37	55	0.673	28	
12	M.A.T.E.R. (E)	32	9	10	13	40	66	0.606	28	Disbanded in 1945
14	Siena	32	13	1	18	49	68	0.721	27	
15	Udinese (T)	32	10	6	16	50	53	0.943	26	1943–44 Serie C never played
16	Novara (T)	32	9	7	16	35	40	0.875	25	1943–44 Serie C never played
17	Savona (T)	32	7	4	21	26	74	0.351	18	1943–44 Serie C never played
18	Palermo–Juve (D, T)	24	6	5	13	–	–	—	17 (Note: Palermo–Juventina had to retire after 29 played matches because of the American invasion of Sicily. All their matches were voided.)	1943–44 Serie C never played

Source: Relegations to canceled 1943–44 tournaments would have been canceled themselves after the war.
(B) Given a break due to suffering huge war damages; (C) Champions; (D) Dissolved due the war; (E) Eliminated; (P) Promoted; (T) Qualified, but not yet for the particular phase indicated

== Results ==
Home \ Away	ALE	ANC	BRE	CRE	FAN	MAT	MOD	NAP	NOV	PAD	PAL	PES	PIS	PPA	SVN	SIE	SPE	UDI
Alessandria		3–1	1–0	1–1	0–1	3–1	1–3	0–0	0–0	1–0	1-0	0–0	2–1	1–3	5–0	1–0	0–3	2–1
Anconitana	0–2		0–1	2–1	0–0	3–3	1–0	2–5	2–1	5–0	2-0	2–1	3–0	0–2	4–0	1–0	3–1	3–2
Brescia	5–0	4–0		2–1	2–0	2–2	1–2	1–0	1–0	2–1	2-1	3–1	0–0	0–0	3–1	2–0	3–2	3–2
Cremonese	2–1	3–0	1–0		1–2	4–1	0–0	1–0	2–0	1–0	2-0	2–1	2–0	0–0	3–1	0–1	0–3	1–0
Fanfulla	1–2	5–1	1–1	1–2		5–0	1–2	0–0	3–1	2–0	3-1	4–0	5–2	2–2	3–0	8–1	1–0	4–2
MATER	4–1	4–0	1–5	1–0	2–1		1–1	0–0	0–0	4–2	1-0	1–2	1–2	3–2	1–1	1–2	0–0	1–3
Modena	1–1	1–1	3–1	3–0	6–2	1–2		3–0	4–1	2–0		5–1	3–0	2–0	3–1	5–2	3–2	3–0
Napoli	2–1	1–0	2–1	3–1	2–1	5–0	0–1		2–1	0–0	3-1	4–0	1–1	3–0	2–0	3–2	1–2	2–1
Novara	1–0	2–1	0–1	4–0	1–0	0–1	2–0	0–0		2–0	3-1	1–1	0–1	0–1	4–0	5–1	1–1	0–2
Padova	7–3	5–0	0–0	0–0	4–1	1–2	0–2	1–2	1–1		0-1	3–0	3–1	2–1	4–0	5–0	2–1	2–0
Palermo–Juventina	2-0		0-0		3-0		1-0			0-0		1-0	1-1				0-2	2-2
Pescara	5–0	3–2	1–1	3–1	4–1	1–1	0–0	3–1	1–4	3–0			1–1	0–1	1–0	2–0	0–3	2–2
Pisa	2–1	2–2	2–0	2–1	2–1	1–1	3–0	2–0	0–0	1–2		3–1		1–0	2–0	4–1	1–0	4–0
Pro Patria	1–1	5–0	0–0	0–0	0–0	3–0	0–0	1–1	3–1	1–0	1-0	0–0	1–0		4–0	3–1	1–1	3–0
Savona	3–0	1–1	1–2	1–0	1–0	1–0	4–1	0–1	1–0	1–1	2-2	1–4	1–3	0–2		3–2	1–1	0–3
Siena	4–2	0–3	2–1	4–2	2–1	4–0	1–4	0–2	2–1	0–1	1-2	2–0	2–0	3–0	5–0		1–1	3–1
Spezia	0–1	1–1	3–4	0–3	2–2	1–1	2–1	0–0	4–0	2–0	3-0	1–1	1–1	2–0	4–0	3–0		5–0
Udinese	2–0	0–1	0–1	2–2	1–1	9–0	0–0	1–1	4–1	1–1	1-0	0–1	1–0	1–0	5–2	3–1	1–3	

Updated to match(es) played on unknown. Source: Almanacco Illustrato del Calcio - La Storia 1898-2004, Panini Edizioni, Modena, September 2005 (in Italian)
Legend: Blue = home team win; Yellow = draw; Red = away team win.

== References and sources ==
- Almanacco Illustrato del Calcio - La Storia 1898-2004, Panini Edizioni, Modena, September 2005
