= Fosco Becattini =

Italian footballer and manager

Personal information
- Date of birth: 16 March 1925
- Place of birth: Sestri Levante, Italy
- Date of death: 14 December 2016 (aged 91)
- Height: 1.66 m (5 ft 5 1/2 in)
- Position: Defender

Senior career*
Years	Team	Apps	(Gls)
1943–1944	Sestri Levante		
1945–1961	Genoa	425	(1)

International career
1949	Italy	2	(0)
- * Club domestic league appearances and goals

Fosco Becattini (Italian pronunciation: [ˈfosko bekatˈtiːni; ˈfɔs-]; 16 March 1925 – 14 December 2016) was an Italian football player and manager, who played as a defender.

== Club career ==
Becattini played for 12 seasons in the Serie A with Genoa C.F.C. (338 games, 1 goal). He has the second-most appearances for Genoa C.F.C. with 425.

== International career ==
Becattini made his debut for the Italy national football team on 27 March 1949 in a 3–1 away win against Spain. He made one more appearance for Italy in the same year.

== Death ==
Becattini died in December 2016 at the age of 91.
