= Aristide Coscia =

Italian footballer and coach (1918-1979)

Personal information
- Full name: Aristide Francisco Coscia
- Date of birth: March 15, 1918
- Place of birth: Alessandria, Italy
- Date of death: February 28, 1979 (aged 60)
- Place of death: Alessandria, Italy
- Height: 1.74 m (5 ft 8 1/2 in)
- Position: Midfielder

Senior career*
Years	Team	Apps	(Gls)
1936–1938	Alessandria	38	(10)
1938–1943	Roma	139	(24)
1943–1944	Ambrosiana-Inter	19	(1)
1944–1945	Varese		
1945–1946	Juventus	38	(9)
1946–1948	Alessandria	76	(15)
1948–1954	Sampdoria	149	(12)

Managerial career
- 1963: Altay Izmir
- 1964–1965: Alessandria
- * Club domestic league appearances and goals

Aristide Coscia (15 March 1918 – 28 February 1979) was an Italian professional football player and coach.

He played 14 seasons (370 games, 51 goals) in the Serie A for U.S. Alessandria Calcio 1912, A.S. Roma and U.C. Sampdoria. He is among the top 100 players with the most tabloid appearances in the Serie A.

== Honours ==
- Serie A champion: 1941/42
