= MATER =

Italian football club

M.A.T.E.R.
- Full name: Motori Alimentatori Trasformatori; Elettrici Roma
- Founded: 1933; 93 years ago
- Dissolved: 1945; 81 years ago
- Ground: Motovelodromo Appio, Rome, Italy
Home colours	Away colours

M. A.T. E. R. (Motori Alimentatori Trasformatori Elettrici Roma, often referred to as M.A.T.E.R. Roma) was an Italian association football club located in Rome. It was dissolved in 1945 for lack of funds. Its colors were purple and green.

The club took part in the 1942–43 Serie B season, then it did not survive WW2.
