= Mario Acerbi =

Italian footballer (1913–2010)

Personal information
- Date of birth: 1 July 1913
- Place of birth: Lodi, Italy
- Date of death: 20 February 2010 (aged 96)
- Place of death: Lodi, Italy
- Height: 1.75 m (5 ft 9 in)
- Position: Defender

Senior career*
Years	Team	Apps	(Gls)
1932–1939	Fanfulla		
1939–1943	Roma	77	(0)
1945–1947	Fanfulla		
1947–1948	Olubra		
- * Club domestic league appearances and goals

Mario Acerbi (1 July 1913 – 20 February 2010) was an Italian professional football player.

He played for four seasons (77 games, no goals) in the Serie A for A.S. Roma.

== Honours ==
- Serie A champions: 1941–42
