= Giosuè Stucchi =

Italian footballer (1931–2021)

Personal information
- Date of birth: 13 March 1931
- Place of birth: Bellusco, Italy
- Date of death: 10 May 2021 (aged 90)
- Position: Midfielder

Senior career*
Years	Team	Apps	(Gls)
1951–1953	Vigevano		
1953–1954	Udinese	20	(0)
1954–1961	Roma	148	(2)
1961–1962	Brescia	17	(0)
1962–1963	Tevere Roma	24	(0)
- * Club domestic league appearances and goals

Giosuè Stucchi (13 March 1931 – 10 May 2021) was an Italian professional footballer who played as a midfielder.

He played for seven seasons (168 games, 2 goals) in the Serie A for Udinese Calcio and A.S. Roma.

In 1956 he seriously injured Oscar Massei, which prevented Massei from making his debut for the Italy national team, for which he was called up. Massei ended up never playing for Italy.
