= Valerio Spadoni =

Italian footballer and coach

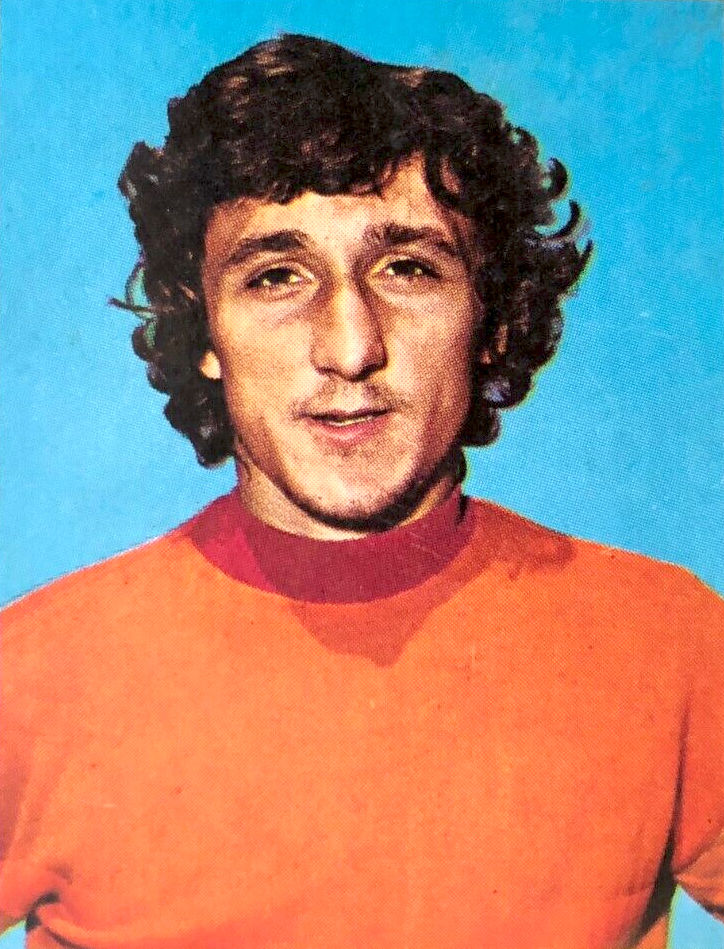
- Spadoni with Roma in 1973

Personal information
- Date of birth: July 22, 1950 (age 76)
- Place of birth: Lugo, Italy
- Height: 1.79 m (5 ft 10 1/2 in)
- Position: Forward

Senior career*
Years	Team	Apps	(Gls)
1967–1968	Baracca Lugo	29	(10)
1968–1969	Atalanta	0	(0)
1969–1970	Baracca Lugo	31	(12)
1970–1972	Rimini	71	(29)
1972–1976	Roma	80	(12)
1976–1977	Rimini	0	(0)

Managerial career
- Baracca Lugo
- * Club domestic league appearances and goals

Valerio Spadoni (born July 22, 1950 in Lugo) is an Italian football coach and former professional player who played as a forward.

He played for 4 seasons (80 games, 12 goals) in Serie A for Roma.

His first stint in Serie A for Atalanta ended without him playing any games due to injuries sustained in a car accident. His Roma career ended with another serious injury he suffered on January 25, 1976 in a collision with Graziano Bini of Internazionale.

Currently runs a comic book store in Lugo.
