= Giuseppe Bonomi =

Italian footballer and coach

Personal information
- Date of birth: January 3, 1913
- Place of birth: Alzano Lombardo, Italy
- Height: 1.65 m (5 ft 5 in)
- Position: Midfielder

Senior career*
| Years | Team | Apps | (Gls) |
| 1931–1932 | Lecco | 10 | (2) |
| 1932–1938 | Atalanta | 93 | (21) |
| 1938–1944 | Roma | 133 | (7) |
| 1945–1946 | Lecco | 17 | (0) |

Managerial career
- 1958: Atalanta
- * Club domestic league appearances and goals

Giuseppe Bonomi (January 3, 1913, in Alzano Lombardo – December 25, 1992) was an Italian professional football player coach.

He played for a few seasons for Atalanta B.C. and then was bought by A.S. Roma for a sum that was very high at the time, 120,000 lire. He was key midfielder for Roma for a few seasons, including their championship 1941/42 campaign.

Overall, he played for six seasons (143 games, 7 goals) in the Serie A for Atalanta and Roma.

== Honours ==
- Serie A champion: 1941/42.
