= Miguel Ángel Pantó =

Argentine footballer

Personal information
- Date of birth: November 26, 1912
- Place of birth: Buenos Aires, Argentina
- Height: 1.72 m (5 ft 7 1/2 in)
- Position: Midfielder

Senior career*
Years	Team	Apps	(Gls)
1934–1935	Platense	9	(2)
1936–1939	San Lorenzo de Almagro	24	(6)
1939–1943	Roma	119	(41)
1945–1947	Roma	21	(0)
- * Club domestic league appearances and goals

Miguel Ángel Pantó (born November 26, 1912, date of death unknown) was an Argentine professional football player. He was born in Buenos Aires and also held Italian citizenship.

He played for five seasons in the Serie A for A.S. Roma (129 games, 41 goal), winning the championship in the 1941/42 season. He was among the top 10 goalscorers of the 1939–40 Serie A with 10 goals.
