= Luigi Brunella =

Italian footballer

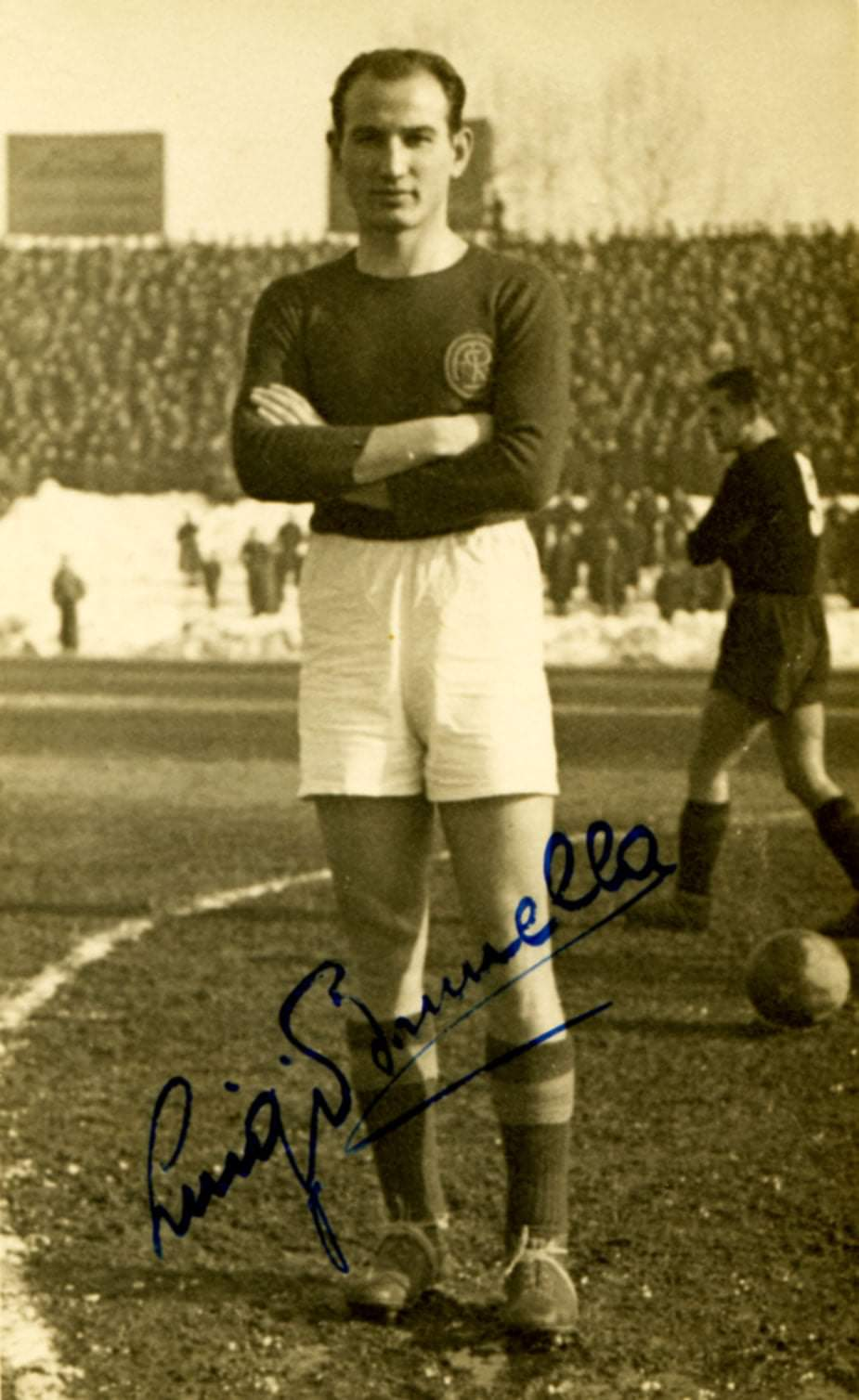

Personal information
- Date of birth: 14 April 1914
- Place of birth: Garlasco, Italy
- Position: Defender

Senior career*
Years	Team	Apps	(Gls)
1932–1935	Vigevanesi		
1935–1939	Torino	86	(0)
1939–1943	Roma	92	(0)
1944	Juventus	24	(0)
1945–1948	Roma	66	(1)

Managerial career
- 1948–1949: Roma
- * Club domestic league appearances and goals

Luigi Brunella (14 April 1914 – 23 May 1993) was an Italian football defender and manager from Garlasco. He spent the largest majority of his playing career at Torino and Roma (where he played over 150 games), before going on to management, taking over at clubs such as Roma.

== Honours ==
Torino

- Coppa Italia: 1935–36

Roma

- Serie A: 1941–42
