= Fosco Risorti =

Italian footballer (1921–1995)

Personal information
- Date of birth: September 8, 1921
- Place of birth: Fucecchio, Italy
- Date of death: November 1995 (aged 74)
- Position: Goalkeeper

Senior career*
Years	Team	Apps	(Gls)
1937–1938	Fucecchio		
1938–1941	Savoia	69	(0)
1941–1943	Roma	3	(0)
1943–1944	Montecatini	4	(0)
1945–1952	Roma	177	(0)
1952–1955	Montecatini		
- * Club domestic league appearances and goals

Fosco Risorti (September 8, 1921 – November 1995) is a retired Italian professional football player. He was born in Fucecchio.

He played for 7 seasons (149 games) in the Serie A for A.S. Roma.

He was blamed for Savoia not achieving promotion in the 1938/39 season after he allowed a goal from a kick taken from the significant distance: the ball bounced unexpectedly off a stone on the field.

During Roma's championship 1941/42 season, he was the backup goalkeeper.

== Honours ==
- Serie A champion: 1941/42.
