= Omero Carmellini =

Italian footballer

Personal information
- Date of birth: 28 January 1921
- Place of birth: Rome, Italy
- Date of death: 24 September 1997 (aged 76)
- Place of death: Rome, Italy
- Position: Striker

Senior career*
Years	Team	Apps	(Gls)
1939–1940	Rimini	27	(8)
1940–1941	Roma	3	(0)
1941–1942	Alba Roma		
- * Club domestic league appearances and goals

Omero Carmellini (28 January 1921 – 24 September 1997) was an Italian professional football player.

He played 3 games for A.S. Roma in the Serie A in the 1940/41 season. He died in Rome in September 1997 at the age of 56.
