= Ermes Borsetti =

Italian footballer (1913–2005)

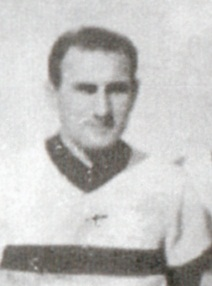

Personal information
- Date of birth: 25 August 1913
- Place of birth: Vercelli, Kingdom of Italy
- Date of death: 23 September 2005 (aged 92)
- Height: 1.71 m (5 ft 7 1/2 in)
- Position: Midfielder

Senior career*
Years	Team	Apps	(Gls)
1933–1935	Pro Vercelli	30	(3)
1935–1937	Fiorentina	48	(11)
1937–1939	Roma	48	(14)
1939–1940	Torino	22	(8)
1940–1945	Roma	56	(13)
1945–1946	Lecco	1	(0)
1946–1948	Rieti	59	(9)
1950–1951	Colleferro	17	(5)
- * Club domestic league appearances and goals

Ermes Borsetti (25 August 1913 – 23 September 2005) was an Italian professional football player. He was born in Vercelli.

Borsetti played for 10 seasons (187 games, 44 goals) in the Serie A for U.S. Pro Vercelli Calcio, ACF Fiorentina, A.S. Roma and A.C. Torino.

== Honours ==
- Serie A champion: 1941/42
