= Naim Kryeziu =

Kosovar footballer

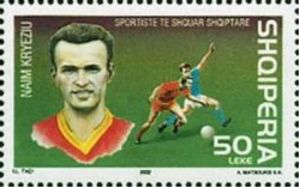
- Kryeziu on a 2002 stamp of Albania

Personal information
- Full name: Naim Kryeziu
- Date of birth: 4 January 1918
- Place of birth: Đakovica, Austro-Hungarian occupied Montenegro (now Gjakova, Kosovo)
- Date of death: 20 March 2010 (aged 92)
- Place of death: Rome, Italy
- Height: 1.70 m (5 ft 7 in)
- Position: Right winger

Senior career*
Years	Team	Apps	(Gls)
1933–1939	Tirana		
1939–1947	Roma	122	(27)
1947–1952	Napoli	168	(39)
1953–1954	Turris	22	(2)
Total		312	(68)

Managerial career
- 1956–1962: Almas Roma
- 1963: Roma
- 1970–1973: Almas Roma
- * Club domestic league appearances and goals

Naim Kryeziu (4 January 1918 – 20 March 2010) was a Kosovar football player who played as a right winger. He is most remembered for the fame he achieved while playing in Italy in the 1940s and 1950s.

== Club career ==
Born in Gjakova, Kosovo, Kryeziu was a particularly quick right winger able to run 100 m in 11 seconds. He left his town in Kosovo as a youngster to join his brother in Tirana, making his footballing debut in the domestic top flight at the age of 15. Following the 1939 Italian invasion of Albania, he was noted by an Italian sports professor who suggested him to AS Roma. As he was considered an Italian following the annexation of Albania, he was allowed to enrol in the Rome ISEF (Italian sports university) whilst also playing for AS Roma, where he won an Italian title in 1941–42. He played for the giallorossi until 1948, when he joined A.C. Napoli; he finally retired in 1953.

== Later career ==
He later started an coaching career, serving also as AS Roma head coach for a short time during the 1963–64 season as a replacement for Alfredo Foni. He then became a scout for AS Roma, for which he discovered a young Giuseppe Giannini when played in a local club Frattocchie Marino.

Kryeziu died in Rome at the age of 92 in 2010. He was the last living player of the first historical AS Roma scudetto. AS Roma, who was scheduled to play an evening game against Udinese on that day, played the game with black armbands to honour him.
