= Amedeo Amadei =

Italian footballer and manager (1921-2013)

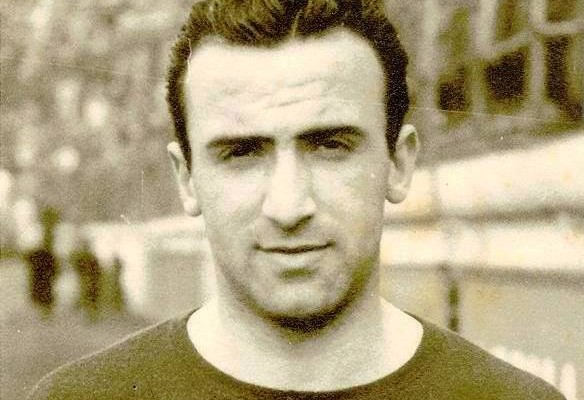

Personal information
- Full name: Amedeo Amadei
- Date of birth: 26 July 1921
- Place of birth: Frascati, Italy
- Date of death: 24 November 2013 (aged 92)
- Place of death: Frascati, Italy
- Height: 1.73 m (5 ft 8 in)
- Position: Striker

Senior career*
Years	Team	Apps	(Gls)
1936–1938	Roma	6	(1)
1938–1939	Atalanta	33	(4)
1939–1948	Roma	228 (Note: "100 goals in 216 appearances according to some sources, as Amadei scored 15 goals in 34 appearances in the 1945–46 Italian Football "After War" Championship, which was not truly equivalent to the Serie A, as it featured two groups with Serie A and Serie B teams playing together.)	(115)
1948–1950	Inter	70	(42)
1950–1956	Napoli	171	(47)
Total		508	(209)

International career
1949–1953	Italy	13	(7)

Managerial career
- 1956–1959: Napoli
- 1959–1961: Napoli
- 1963: Lucchese
- 1972–1978: Italy women's
- * Club domestic league appearances and goals

Amedeo Amadei (Italian pronunciation: [ameˈdɛːo amaˈdɛi]; 26 July 1921 – 24 November 2013) was a professional Italian football player and manager, who played as a striker. Following his death in 2013, he was one of eleven members to be inducted into the A.S. Roma Hall of Fame. A fast and powerful forward, with a good touch, he is considered to be one of the best Italian strikers of all time. Amadei was known for his ability to run forward with the ball from midfield and find spaces in the opposing defence, as well as his prolific goalscoring, acrobatic ability in the air, and precise volleying, which allowed him to excel in the centre-forward role; due to his importance to Roma throughout his career, he was affectionately known by the fans as the "eighth King of Rome".

== Club career ==
Amadei was born in Frascati, near Rome, the son of a baker, which earned him the nickname "Fornaretto." He made his professional debut on 2 May 1937 with A.S. Roma aged 15 years and 280 days (the youngest debut in Serie A history; surpassed on 12 May 2021 by Wisdom Amey) in a 2–2 draw against Fiorentina. A week later he scored in a 5–1 defeat to A.S. Lucchese Libertas 1905 on 9 May 1937, making him the youngest scorer in Serie A history, a record he holds to this day. He also played in Serie B with Atalanta B.C., Inter and S.S.C. Napoli. He won one Italian title with Roma in the 1941–42 season; this was the club's first ever championship. With A.S. Roma he played 386 matches and scored 101 goals in the Italian top flight, as well as 11 in the Coppa Italia in 18 appearances, 16 goals in eight appearances in the 1944 Campionato Alta Italia, and 15 goals in 34 appearances in the 1945–46 Italian Football "After War" Championship; in his entire career he played 423 matches and scored 174 goals in Serie A, with a total of 508 appearances and 209 goals coming in league play.

== International career ==
Amadei represented the Italian national team on 13 occasions between 1949 and 1953, scoring 7 goals; he made his international debut on 27 March 1949, and scored his side's third goal in a 3–1 friendly away win over Spain at the Santiago Bernabéu. The following year, he participated in the 1950 FIFA World Cup with Italy, where he made one appearance during the tournament, in a 2–0 win over Paraguay.

== Coaching career ==
Following his retirement in 1956, Amadei worked as a coach for Napoli, the club with which he retired. He later also coached Lucchese, and the Italy women's national football team.

== Honours ==
=== Club ===
Roma

- Serie A: 1941–42

=== Individual ===
- Seminatore d'Oro: 1957–58
- A.S. Roma Hall of Fame: 2012
- Italian Football Hall of Fame: 2018
