= 1941–42 Serie A =

41st season of top-tier Italian football

Serie A
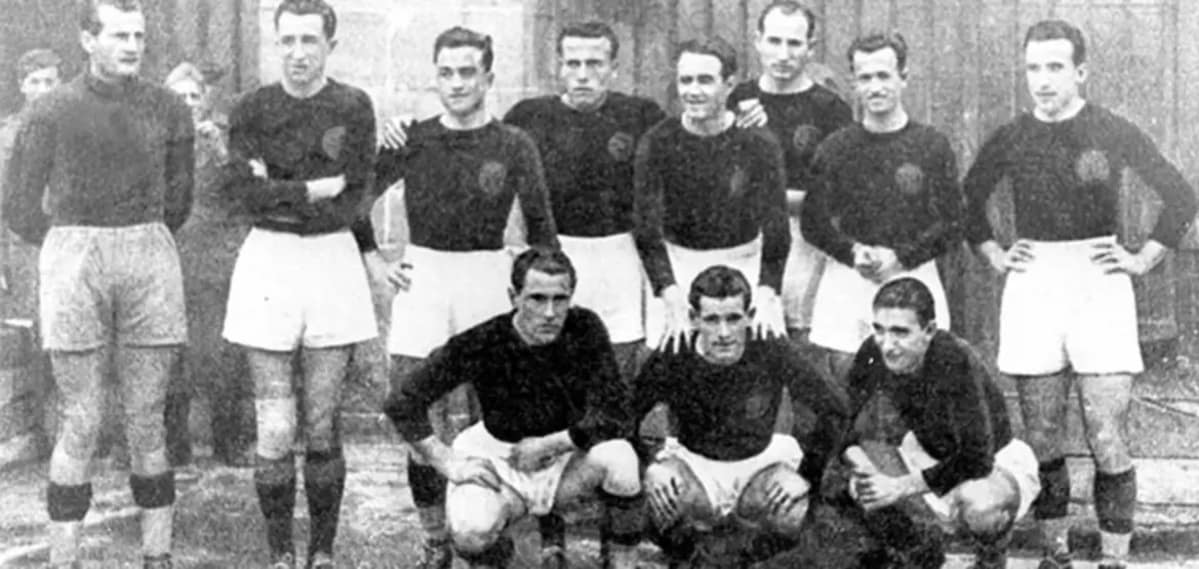
- 1941–42 Roma team
- Season: 1941–42
- Champions: Roma; 1st title
- Relegated: Napoli; Modena
- Matches played: 240
- Goals scored: 687 (2.86 per match)
- Top goalscorer: Aldo Boffi (22 goals)

The 1941-42 Serie A was the forty-second edition of the Italian Football Championship and the thirteenth since 1929 re-branding to create Serie A. It was the nineteenth season from which the Italian Football Champions adorned their team jerseys in the subsequent season with a Scudetto. AS Roma were champions for the first time in their history and the first Italian Football Championship won by a team from outside Northern Italy. This was thus also their first scudetto since the scudetto started being awarded in 1924 and their first win contested as Serie A.

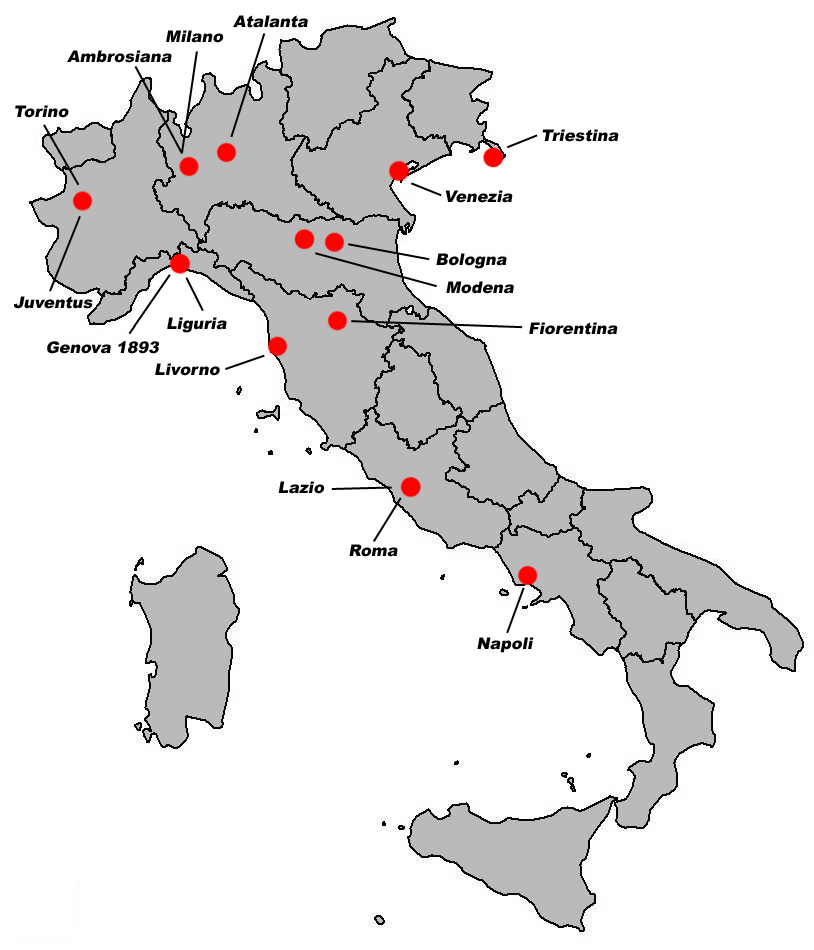
Serie A 1941-42 teams distribution

== Teams ==
Liguria and Modena had been promoted from Serie B.

== Final classification ==
Pos	Team	Pld	W	D	L	GF	GA	GR	Pts	Qualification or relegation
1	Roma (C)	30	16	10	4	55	21	2.619	42	
2	Torino	30	16	7	7	60	39	1.538	39	
3	Venezia	30	15	8	7	40	25	1.600	38	
4	Genova 1893	30	13	11	6	53	35	1.514	37	
5	Lazio	30	14	9	7	55	37	1.486	37	
6	Juventus	30	12	8	10	47	41	1.146	32	
7	Bologna	30	12	5	13	50	37	1.351	29	
8	Triestina	30	8	13	9	29	32	0.906	29	
9	Fiorentina	30	11	5	14	51	50	1.020	27	
10	Milano	30	10	7	13	53	53	1.000	27	
11	Liguria	30	10	7	13	39	56	0.696	27	
12	Ambrosiana-Inter	30	7	12	11	31	47	0.660	26	
13	Atalanta	30	8	8	14	34	47	0.723	24	
14	Livorno	30	9	6	15	35	57	0.614	24	
15	Napoli (R)	30	8	7	15	32	51	0.627	23	Relegation to Serie B
16	Modena (R)	30	6	7	17	23	59	0.390	19	Relegation to Serie B

Source: goal average officially used in event of equal points.
(C) Champions; (R) Relegated

== Results ==
Home \ Away	AMB	ATA	BOL	FIO	GEN	JUV	LAZ	LIG	LIV	MIL	MOD	NAP	ROM	TOR	TRI	VEN
Ambrosiana-Inter		0–0	0–1	0–1	1–1	4–1	0–1	2–1	1–1	2–2	1–0	5–1	0–2	2–3	1–1	1–1
Atalanta	1–1		0–2	2–1	0–0	2–3	3–0	1–1	4–0	0–2	3–0	5–1	2–2	1–3	1–1	1–0
Bologna	0–1	4–0		2–3	1–1	2–0	2–2	2–2	7–1	3–1	4–0	1–2	1–2	1–0	2–0	2–0
Fiorentina	4–1	0–1	2–5		2–0	1–1	3–1	4–1	2–0	4–3	8–0	0–1	2–2	2–1	2–1	1–3
Genova 1893	6–1	1–0	3–2	4–0		1–4	1–2	1–1	3–1	1–1	6–0	3–0	2–0	4–3	0–0	1–0
Juventus	4–0	1–1	1–1	4–2	1–1		2–0	3–0	2–3	3–2	1–1	1–1	2–0	3–0	1–0	0–0
Lazio	2–2	2–1	5–1	1–1	1–1	2–1		4–0	3–0	2–2	2–1	1–0	1–1	4–1	5–0	2–1
Liguria	0–1	1–0	2–1	1–1	3–4	2–1	4–1		4–2	1–0	2–1	2–1	0–3	1–0	2–2	0–2
Livorno	3–0	3–1	1–1	3–1	0–0	1–2	2–1	2–0		0–2	2–2	2–0	0–2	1–1	1–0	1–1
Milano	2–1	1–3	2–0	2–1	3–0	1–1	2–5	3–2	0–2		7–1	3–1	4–2	2–5	2–2	1–1
Modena	1–1	2–0	1–0	1–1	2–3	0–2	1–0	1–1	3–0	1–0		1–0	0–0	0–3	0–1	0–1
Napoli	0–1	3–0	1–2	1–0	0–0	4–1	1–1	1–1	2–1	2–1	2–1		1–1	0–0	0–1	1–1
Roma	6–0	2–0	1–0	1–0	1–2	2–0	2–1	7–0	4–0	2–0	2–0	5–1		0–0	0–0	0–0
Torino	1–1	9–1	1–0	3–1	1–1	2–1	1–1	3–2	1–0	1–0	2–0	5–3	2–2		2–0	2–1
Triestina	0–0	0–0	1–0	2–0	2–1	3–0	0–0	0–1	5–1	2–2	1–1	1–0	0–0	1–3		2–2
Venezia	0–0	1–0	1–0	2–1	2–1	2–0	0–2	2–1	2–1	2–0	3–1	4–1	0–1	3–1	2–0	

Source: Almanacco Illustrato del Calcio - La Storia 1898-2004, Panini Edizioni, Modena, September 2005 (in Italian)
Legend: Blue = home team win; Yellow = draw; Red = away team win.

== Top goalscorers ==
Rank	Player	Club	Goals
1	(Italy) Aldo Boffi	Milano	22
2	(Italy) Amedeo Amadei	Roma	18
2	(Italy) Renato Gei	Fiorentina	18
2	(Italy) Silvio Piola	Lazio	18
5	(Italy) Bruno Ispiro	Genova 1893	17
6	(Italy) Guglielmo Gabetto	Juventus	16
7	(Albania) Riza Lushta	Juventus	15
8	(Argentina) Silvestro Pisa	Lazio	14
8	(Italy) Ettore Puricelli	Bologna	14
8	(Italy) Romeo Menti	Torino	14
11	(Italy) Francesco Pernigo	Venezia	12

== References and sources ==
- Almanacco Illustrato del Calcio - La Storia 1898-2004, Panini Edizioni, Modena, September 2005
