= 1935–36 Bologna FC 1909 season =

Bologna Associazione Giuoco del Calcio
1935-36 season
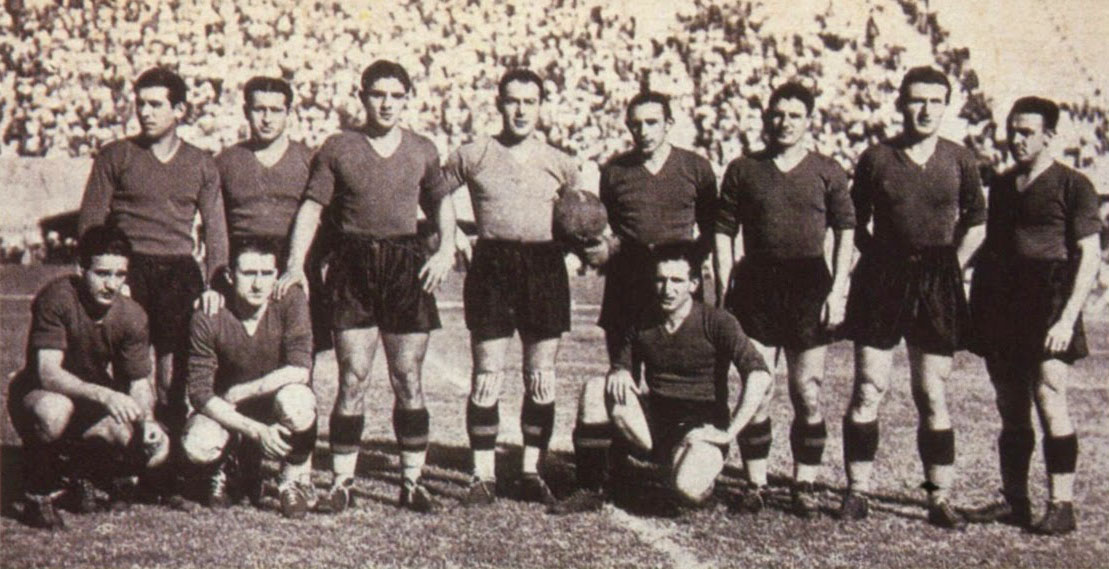
- President: Renato Dall'Ara
- Manager: Árpád Weisz
- Stadium: Stadio Littoriale
- Serie A: 1st (in Mitropa Cup)
- Coppa Italia: Eightfinals
- Mitropa Cup: Eightfinals
- Top goalscorer: League: Angelo Schiavio (10); All: Schiavio (11)
Home colours	Away colours

During the 1935–36 season Bologna Associazione Giuoco del Calcio competed in Serie A, Coppa Italia and Mitropa Cup.

== Summary ==
The club won its 3rd title ever after a closed race managed by Hungarian coach Weisz. With 40 points over top of the table passed A.S. Roma (39), Torino (38) third place, Ambrosiana (36) and Juventus fifth with 35 points.

== Squad ==
Note: Flags indicate national team as defined under FIFA eligibility rules; some limited exceptions apply. Players may hold more than one non-FIFA nationality.

Pos.	Nation	Player
GK	ITA	Mario Gianni
GK	ITA	Secondo Roggero
DF	ITA	Giordano Corsi
DF	ITA	Dino Fiorini
DF	ITA	Felice Gasperi
DF	ITA	Mario Montesanto
MF	ITA	Michele Andreolo
MF	ITA	Amedeo Biavati

Pos.	Nation	Player
MF	ITA	Aldo Donati
MF	ITA	Francisco Fedullo
MF	ITA	Raffaele Sansone
FW	ITA	Gerardo Ottani
FW	ITA	Bruno Maini
FW	ITA	Carlo Reguzzoni
FW	ITA	Angelo Schiavio
FW	ITA	Alcide Ivan Violi

== Competitions ==
=== Serie A ===
==== League table ====
Pos	Team	Pld	W	D	L	GF	GA	GD	Pts	Qualification or relegation
1	Bologna (C)	30	15	10	5	39	21	+18	40	1936 Mitropa Cup
2	Roma	30	16	7	7	32	20	+12	39	1936 Mitropa Cup
3	Torino	30	16	6	8	49	33	+16	38	1936 Mitropa Cup
4	Ambrosiana-Inter	30	14	8	8	61	34	+27	36	1936 Mitropa Cup
5	Juventus	30	13	9	8	46	33	+13	35	

Source: Panini
(C) Champions

==== Matches ====
22 September 1935 1	Bologna	4–1	Genoa	Bologna
	Maini 55'; Schiavio 60'; Fedullo 70'; Sansone 72' (pen.)	Report	30' Stabile	Stadium: Stadio Littoriale; Referee: Scarpi

29 September 1935 2	Fiorentina	0–1	Bologna	Florence
		Report	35' Fedullo	Stadium: Stadio Giovanni Berta; Referee: Generoso Dattilo

6 October 1935 3	Bologna	3–0	Ambrosiana-Inter	Bologna
	Andreolo 7'; Schiavio 28', 43'	Report		Stadium: Stadio Littoriale; Referee: Francesco Mattea

13 October 1935 4	Napoli	0–1	Bologna	Naples
		Report	40' Sansone	Stadium: Stadio Giorgio Ascarelli; Referee: Ferruccio Bonivento

20 October 1935 5	Juventus	0–0	Bologna	Turin
		Report		Stadium: Stadio Benito Mussolini; Referee: Angelo Gianelli

3 November 1935 6	Bologna	1–0	Brescia	Bologna
	Schiavio 38'	Report		Stadium: Stadio Littoriale; Referee: Saracini

10 November 1935 7	Milan	1–2	Bologna	Milan
	Arnoni 90'	Report	44' Andreolo; 84' Reguzzoni	Stadium: San Siro; Referee: Mario Ciamberlini

17 November 1935 8	Bologna	2–0	Roma	Bologna
	Sansone 57'; Fedullo 78'	Report		Stadium: Stadio Littoriale; Referee: Giuseppe Scarpi

1 December 1935 9	Sampierdarenese	0–0	Bologna	Genoa
		Report		Stadium: Stadio del Littorio; Referee: Achille Pizziolo

8 December 1935 10	Bologna	1–1	Alessandria	Bologna
	Sansone 40'	Report	71' Busani	Stadium: Stadio Littoriale; Referee: Generoso Dattilo

15 December 1935 11	Torino	0–0	Bologna	Turin
		Report		Stadium: Stadio Filadelfia; Referee: Gialma Bevilacqua

22 December 1935 12	Bologna	2–0	Lazio	Bologna
	Ottani 5'; Violi 75'	Report		Stadium: Stadio Littoriale; Referee: Giacomo Bertolio

29 December 1935 13	Bologna	0–2	Bari	Bologna
		Report	27' Rossini; 88' Brossi	Stadium: Stadio Littoriale; Referee: Ciamberlini

5 January 1936 14	Palermo	2–0	Bologna	Palermo
	Bonesini 25'; Piccaluga 42'	Report		Stadium: Campo del Littorio; Referee: Giacomo Bertolio

12 January 1936 15	Triestina	2–2	Bologna	Trieste
	Mian 44'; Rocco 60'	Report	21', 28' Sansone	Stadium: Stadio Littorio; Referee: Generoso Dattilo

26 January 1936 16	Genoa	1–1	Bologna	Genoa
	Esposto 23'	Report	49' Maini	Stadium: Stadio Luigi Ferraris; Referee: Bevilacqua

2 February 1936 17	Bologna	1–0	Fiorentina	Bologna
	Sansone 27'	Report		Stadium: Stadio Littoriale; Referee: Barlassina

9 February 1936 18	Ambrosiana-Inter	3–1	Bologna	Milan
	Porta 31' (pen.); Meazza 33'; Demaría 38'	Report	11' Sansone	Stadium: Arena Civica; Referee: Bevilacqua

16 February 1936 19	Bologna	2–1	Napoli	Bologna
	Maini 33'; Ottani 55'	Report	50' Buscaglia	Stadium: Stadio Littoriale; Referee: Lelio Salvatori

23 February 1936 20	Bologna	2–1	Juventus	Bologna
	Schiavio 25'; Ottani 36'	Report	43' Gabetto	Stadium: Stadio Littoriale; Referee: Mazzarini

1 March 1936 21	Brescia	3–0	Bologna	Brescia
	Chiecchi III 10', 66'	Report	16' Schiavio	Stadium: Stadium di Viale Piave; Referee: Giuseppe Scarpi

8 March 1936 22	Bologna	4–1	Milan	Bologna
	Ottani 30'; Fedullo 66'; Schiavio 77', 80'	Report	87' Arnoni	Stadium: Stadio Littoriale; Referee: Gialma Bevilacqua

15 March 1936 23	Roma	1–0	Bologna	Rome
	Cattaneo 87'	Report		Stadium: Campo Testaccio; Referee: Mario Scotto

22 March 1936 24	Bologna	0–0	Sampierdarenese	Bologna
		Report		Stadium: Stadio Littoriale; Attendance: 20 000; Referee: Alfredo Conticini

29 March 1936 25	Alessandria	1–1	Bologna	Alessandria
	Busani 90'	Report	52' (pen.) Reguzzoni	Stadium: Campo del Littorio; Referee: Gialma Bevilacqua

12 April 1936 26	Bologna	2–0	Torino	Bologna
	Reguzzoni 62' (pen.); Maini 64'	Report		Stadium: Stadio Littoriale; Referee: Rinaldo Barlassina

19 April 1936 27	Lazio	1–1	Bologna	Rome
	Uneddu 27'	Report	39' Schiavio	Stadium: Stadio Nazionale del PNF; Referee: Angelo Gianelli

26 April 1936 28	Bari	0–0	Bologna	Bari
		Report		Stadium: Stadio della Vittoria; Referee: Giuseppe Scarpi

3 May 1936 29	Bologna	1–0	Palermo	Bologna
	Andreolo 47'	Report		Stadium: Stadio Littoriale; Referee: Pompeo Casati

10 May 1936 30	Bologna	3–0	Triestina	Bologna
	Andreolo 11'; Schiavio 46'; Rocco 64' (o.g.)	Report		Stadium: Stadio Littoriale; Referee: Angelo Gianelli

=== Coppa Italia ===
==== Round of 32 ====
25 December 1935	Bologna	1–0	Novara	Bologna
	Violi 30'			Stadium: Stadio Littoriale; Referee: Alfredo Conticini

==== Eightfinals ====
19 January 1936	Milan	3–0	Bologna	Milan
	Arcari III 53', 71'; Moretti 64'			Stadium: San Siro; Referee: Giuseppe Scarpi

=== Mitropa Cup ===
==== Eightfinals ====
21 June 1936	Bologna	2–1	Austria Wien	Bologna
	Maini 6'; Schiavio 21'		77' Viertl	Stadium: Stadio Littoriale; Referee: (Czech Republic) Brüll

28 June 1936	Austria Wien	4–0	Bologna	Wien
	Jerusalem 12', 90'; Stroh 31'; Sindelar 87'			Stadium: Prater; Referee: (Hungary) Mihály Iváncsics

== Statistics ==
=== Squad statistics ===
Competition	Points	Home						Away						Total						GD
Competition	Points	G	W	D	L	Gs	Ga	G	W	D	L	Gs	Ga	G	W	D	L	Gs	Ga	GD
Serie A	40	15	12	2	1	28	7	15	3	8	4	11	14	30	15	10	5	39	21	+18
Coppa Italia		1	1	0	0	1	0	1	0	0	1	0	3	2	1	0	1	1	3	-2
Mitropa Cup		1	1	0	0	2	1	1	0	0	1	0	4	2	1	0	1	2	5	-3
Total	-	17	14	2	1	31	8	17	3	8	6	11	21	34	17	10	7	42	29	+13

=== Players statistics ===
==== Appearances ====
34. (Italy) Michele Andreolo 1. (Italy) Amedeo Biavati 9. (Italy) Aldo Donati 32. (Italy) Giordano Corsi 31. (Italy) Francisco Fedullo 34. (Italy) Dino Fiorini 34. (Italy) Felice Gasperi 34. (Italy) Mario Gianni 26. (Italy) Bruno Maini 27. (Italy) Mario Montesanto 11. (Italy) Gerardo Ottani 34. (Italy) Carlo Reguzzoni 31. (Italy) Raffaele Sansone 28. (Italy) Angelo Schiavio 8. (Italy) Alcide Ivan Violi

==== Goalscorers ====
4.* (Italy) Michele Andreolo
4.* (Italy) Francisco Fedullo
5.* (Italy) Bruno Maini
4.* (Italy) Gerardo Ottani
3.* (Italy) Carlo Reguzzoni
8.* (Italy) Raffaele Sansone
11.* (Italy) Angelo Schiavio
2.* (Italy) Alcide Ivan Violi

== Bibliography ==
- Almanacco illustrato del calcio - La storia 1898-2004, Modena. Panini.
- Carlo F. Chiesa. Il grande romanzo dello scudetto. da Calcio 2000 years 2002 and 2003.
- "Stadio Il Littoriale, 1935 and 1936". Corriere dello Sport.
- "Championship 1935 and 1936". La Stampa. Archived from the original on 2011-04-11.
