= 1936 Coppa Italia final =

2nd Coppa Italia final
- Event: 1935–36 Coppa Italia
Torino	Alessandria
5	1
- Date: 11 June 1936
- Venue: Stadio Luigi Ferraris, Genoa
- Referee: Raffaele Mastellari
- Attendance: 10,000

The 1935–36 Coppa Italia final was a single match played on 11 June 1936, between Torino and Alessandria at the Stadio Luigi Ferraris in Genoa.

It was the first Coppa Italia final since 1922; in fact this tournament was not organized in the 1923–1925 and 1928–1935 periods; 1926–27 edition was interrupted after few rounds.

Both Torino and Alessandria were playing in Serie A at that time. To reach the final match, Torino defeated in succession Reggiana (2–0), Catania (8–2), Livorno (4–2 after extra time) and Fiorentina (2–0); all those matches were played in Turin, as decided by drawing. Alessandria at first eliminated Cremonese (4–1) away, then defeated Modena (4–0), Lazio (1–0) and Milano (1–0) playing on its field.

About 10,000 people followed the final match in Genoa, for a 62,000 Italian lire profit. The referee was Raffaele Mastellari from Bologna.

== Match ==
11 June 1936
16:00

Torino	5–1	Alessandria
Galli 8', 70'; Silano 20', 76'; Buscaglia 57'		Riccardi 14'

Stadio Luigi Ferraris, Genoa
Attendance: 10,000
Referee: Raffaele Mastellari

Torino	Alessandria

GK	1	(Italy) Giuseppe Maina
DF	2	(Italy) Luigi Brunella
DF	3	(Italy) Osvaldo Ferrini
MF	4	(Italy) Cesare Gallea
MF	5	(Italy) Antonio Janni
MF	6	(Italy) Filippo Prato
FW	7	(Italy) Mario Bo
FW	8	(Italy) Fioravante Baldi
FW	9	(Italy) Remo Galli
FW	10	(Italy) Pietro Buscaglia
FW	11	(Italy) Onesto Silano
Manager:
(Austria) Tony Cargnelli

GK	1	(Italy) Ugo Ceresa
DF	2	(Italy) Umberto Lombardo
DF	3	(Italy) Giuseppe Turino
MF	4	(Italy) Oreste Barale
MF	5	(Italy) Pasquale Parodi
MF	6	(Italy) Luigi Milano
FW	7	(Italy) Umberto Busani
FW	8	(Italy) Giovanni Riccardi
FW	9	(Italy) Alfredo Notti
FW	10	(Italy) Luciano Robotti
FW	11	(Italy) Aldo Croce
Manager:
(Austria) Karl Stürmer

== Sources ==
- Almanacco Illustrato del Calcio – La Storia 1898–2004, Panini Edizioni, Modena, September 2005
