= 1938 Coppa Italia final =

4th Coppa Italia final
- Event: 1937–38 Coppa Italia
Torino	Juventus
2	5

First leg
Torino	Juventus
1	3
- Date: 1 May 1938
- Venue: Stadio Filadelfia, Turin
- Referee: Raffaele Mastellari
- Attendance: 14,957

Second leg
Juventus	Torino
2	1
- Date: 8 May 1938
- Venue: Stadio Benito Mussolini, Turin
- Referee: Raffaele Mastellari
- Attendance: 9,091

The 1938 Coppa Italia final was the final of the 1937–38 Coppa Italia. The match was played over two legs on 1 and 8 May 1938 between Torino and Juventus. Both teams had their stadiums, so the original final in Turin was divided into a two-legged match. Juventus won 5–2 on aggregate.

== First leg ==
1 May 1938
15:30

Torino	1–3	Juventus
D'Odorico 35'		Bellini 24' 85'; De Filippis 72'

Stadio Filadelfia, Turin
Attendance: 14,957
Referee: Raffaele Mastellari

Torino	Juventus

GK	1	(Italy) Giuseppe Maina
DF	2	(Italy) Luigi Brunella
DF	3	(Italy) Osvaldo Ferrini
MF	4	(Italy) Aldo Cadario
MF	5	(Italy) Giacinto Ellena
MF	6	(Italy) Bruno Neri
FW	7	(Italy) Mario Bo
FW	8	(Italy) Cesare Gallea
FW	9	(Italy) Fioravante Baldi III
FW	10	(Italy) Pietro Buscaglia
FW	11	(Italy) Walter D'Odorico
Manager:
(Italy) Mario Sperone

GK	1	(Italy) Alfredo Bodoira
DF	2	(Italy) Alfredo Foni
DF	3	(Italy) Pietro Rava
MF	4	(Italy) Teobaldo Depetrini
MF	5	(Argentina) (Italy) Luis Monti
MF	6	(Italy) Mario Varglien I
FW	7	(Italy) Savino Bellini
FW	8	(Italy) Lodovico De Filippis
FW	9	(Italy) Guglielmo Gabetto
FW	10	(Italy) Ernesto Tomasi
FW	11	(Italy) Aldo Giuseppe Borel I
Manager:
(Italy) Virginio Rosetta

== Second leg ==
8 May 1938
15:30

Juventus	2–1	Torino
Gabetto 28' 38'		Baldi III 20'

Stadio Benito Mussolini, Turin
Attendance: 9,091
Referee: Raffaele Mastellari

Juventus	Torino

GK	1	(Italy) Alfredo Bodoira
DF	2	(Italy) Alfredo Foni
DF	3	(Italy) Pietro Rava
MF	4	(Italy) Teobaldo Depetrini
MF	5	(Argentina) (Italy) Luis Monti
MF	6	(Italy) Mario Varglien I
FW	7	(Italy) Savino Bellini
FW	8	(Italy) Lodovico De Filippis
FW	9	(Italy) Guglielmo Gabetto
FW	10	(Italy) Ernesto Tomasi
FW	11	(Italy) Aldo Giuseppe Borel I
Manager:
(Italy) Virginio Rosetta

GK	1	(Italy) Giuseppe Maina
DF	2	(Italy) Luigi Brunella
DF	3	(Italy) Osvaldo Ferrini
MF	4	(Italy) Aldo Cadario
MF	5	(Italy) Giacinto Ellena
MF	6	(Italy) Bruno Neri
FW	7	(Italy) Mario Bo
FW	8	(Italy) Raffaele Vallone
FW	9	(Italy) Fioravante Baldi III
FW	10	(Italy) Pietro Buscaglia
FW	11	(Italy) Walter D'Odorico
Manager:
(Italy) Mario Sperone
