= 1935–36 Coppa Italia =

Tournament details
- Country: Italy
- Dates: 14 Sept 1935 – 11 June 1936
- Teams: 98

Final positions
- Champions: Torino (1st title)
- Runners-up: Alessandria

Tournament statistics
- Matches played: 105
- Goals scored: 370 (3.52 per match)
- Top goal scorer: Pietro Buscaglia (8 goals)

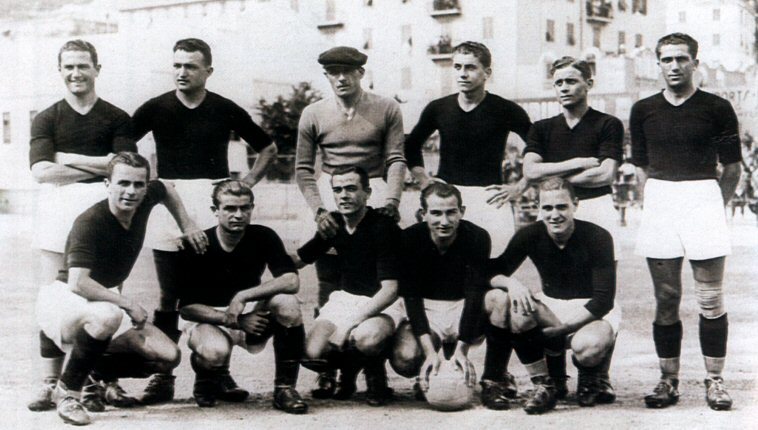
Torino Football Club, 1935-36

The 1935–36 Coppa Italia was the third edition of the national domestic tournament cup in Italian football. The tournament resumed 13 years after the inaugural tournament in 1922 and nine years after the 1926–27 Coppa Italia, which was abandoned due to lack of available dates.

Ninety-eight teams, all members of the Direttorio Divisioni Superiori, took part in the competition, which included a first phase, with elimination rounds reserved for Serie B and C teams, and a final phase, where the 16 winners of the first phase met 16 the Serie A teams. All the matches were played in a single leg with eventual replays under the model of the FA Cup; homefields were decided by a draw except for the final match in Genoa.

Torino won the title, defeating Alessandria in the final match, 5–1, played at the Marassi Stadium in Genoa on June 11, 1936. By winning the cup, Torino also qualified for the 1936 edition of the Mitropa Cup.

== Serie C elimination rounds ==
All 64 Serie C teams in the 4 Zones (groups) of the championship.

=== First round ===
==== North-East ====
Home team	Score	Away team
Anconitana-Bianchi	4-1	Grion Pola
Fiumana	3-2	Forlimpopoli
Jesi	1-2 (aet)	Rovigo
Mantova	1-1 (aet)	Alma Juventus Fano
Padova	0-0 (aet)	Venezia
Pro Gorizia	2-1	Treviso
Udinese	4-3	Trento
Vicenza	3-4	Rimini

Replay matches

Home team	Score	Away team
Alma Juventus Fano	2-2 *	Mantova
Venezia	2-1	Padova

* Pescara (Zone D) withdrew which qualified both Alma Juventus Fano and Mantova for the second round.

==== Lombard Zone ====
Home team	Score	Away team
Cremonese	2-0	Comense
Cusiana	1-2	Crema
Falck	2-1 (aet)	Pro Patria
Gallaratese	2-1	Biellese
Lecco	0-2	Legnano
Parma	3-1	Fanfulla
Reggiana	4-1	Piacenza
Seregno	2-0	Monza

==== North-West ====
Home team	Score	Away team
Andrea Doria	5-3	Asti
Empoli	1-0	Pontedera
Imperia	3-1	Derthona
Montevarchi	2-1	Pontedecimo
Sanremese	2-0	Spezia
Savona	1-2	Entella
Sestrese	2-1	Rivarolese
Ventimiglese	4-2	Casale

==== South ====
Home team	Score	Away team
Benevento	2-1	Cosenza
Catanzarese	4-1	Signe
Civitavecchiese	5-1	Fermana
Nissena	2-0	Trapani
Pescara	1-0	Potenza
Piombino	2-0	Cagliari
Salernitana	3-1	Bagnolese
Savoia	2-1 (aet)	Cerignola

=== Second round ===
==== North-East ====
Home team	Score	Away team
Anconitana-Bianchi	1-2	Alma Juventus Fano
Rimini	1-1 (aet)	Pro Gorizia
Rovigo	2-0	Udinese
Venezia	2-0	Fiumana

Replay match

Home team	Score	Away team
Pro Gorizia	3-0	Rimini

==== Lombard Zone ====
Home team	Score	Away team
Crema	0-1	Reggiana
Cremonese	1-0	Gallaratese
Legnano	2-0	Falck
Seregno	2-3	Mantova

==== North-West ====
Home team	Score	Away team
Entella	0-1	Ventimiglese
Imperia	3-4	Sanremese
Parma	3-1	Montevarchi
Sestrese	2-1	Andrea Doria

==== South ====
Home team	Score	Away team
Catanzarese	6-0	Benevento
Civitavecchiese	3-2 (aet)	Savoia
Empoli	1-2	Piombino
Salernitana	0-1	Nissena

== Serie B elimination round ==
Home team	Score	Away team
Atalanta	0-2	Viareggio
Lucchese	2-2 (aet)	L'Aquila

Replay match

Home team	Score	Away team
L'Aquila	2-0	Lucchese

== Third round ==
14 Serie B clubs are added (Catania, Hellas Verona, Livorno, Siena, Messina, Novara, Vigevano, Pisa, Pro Vercelli, Modena, SPAL, Taranto, Foggia, Pistoiese) together with qualified L’Aquila and Viareggio. Clubs were paired by geographical proximity.

Home team	Score	Away team
Catania	4-0	Civitavecchiese
Cremonese	3-1	Mantova
Alma Juventus Fano	2-1	Hellas Verona
Livorno	5-0	Siena
Messina	1-0	Piombino
Nissena	2-2 (aet)	Catanzarese
Novara	5-1	Vigevano
Pisa	3-1	L'Aquila
Pro Vercelli	2-1	Legnano
Reggiana	1-0	Viareggio
Rovigo	2-1	Pro Gorizia
Sanremese	3-2	Parma
Sestrese	3-0	Ventimiglese
SPAL	1-1 (aet)	Modena
Taranto	1-1 (aet)	Foggia
Venezia	2-1	Pistoiese

Replay matches

Home team	Score	Away team
Catanzarese	4-1	Nissena
Modena	3-2	SPAL
Foggia	2-1	Taranto

== Knockout stage ==
All 16 Serie A clubs are added (Torino, Palermo, Sampierdarenese, Ambrosiana-Inter, Brescia, Juventus, Fiorentina, Genova 1893, Alessandria, Lazio, Roma, Napoli, Bari, Triestina, Milan, Bologna).

Round of 32
Torino	2
Reggiana	0
Catania	1
Palermo	0
Livorno	2
Catanzarese	1
Messina	2
Sampierdarenese	4
Ambrosiana–Inter	4
Brescia	0
Sanremese	2
Juventus	4
Fiorentina	8
Sestrese	0
Genova 1893	3
Pisa	2
Cremonese	1
Alessandria	4
Modena	5
Pro Vercelli	0
Lazio	2
Venezia	0
Foggia	0
Roma	4
Napoli	2
Bari	1
Triestina (replay: 3–1)	1
Rovigo	1
Alma Juventus Fano	2
Milan	4
Bologna	1
Novara	0

Round of 16
Torino	8
Catania	2
Livorno (aet)	5
Sampierdarenese	3
Ambrosiana–Inter	0
Juventus	1
Fiorentina	3
Genova 1893	0
Alessandria	4
Modena	0
Lazio	2
Roma	1
Napoli	3
Triestina	1
Milan	3
Bologna	0

Quarterfinals
Torino (aet)	4
Livorno	2
Juventus	1
Fiorentina	3
Alessandria	1
Lazio	0
Napoli	1
Milan	2

Semifinals
Torino	2
Fiorentina	0
Alessandria	1
Milan	0

Final
Torino	5
Alessandria	1

Legend:

- 1935–36 Serie A teams
- 1935–36 Serie B teams
- 1935–36 Serie C teams

== Final ==
11 June 1936
16:00

Torino	5–1	Alessandria
Galli 8', 70'; Silano 20', 76'; Buscaglia 57'		Riccardi 14'

Stadio Luigi Ferraris, Genoa
Attendance: 10,000
Referee: Raffaele Mastellari

== Top goalscorers ==
Rank	Player	Club	Goals
1	(Italy) Pietro Buscaglia	Torino	8
2	(Italy) Gastone Boni	Catanzarese	5
2	(Italy) Bruno Arcari	Livorno	5
4	(Italy) Giovanni Nekadoma	Fiorentina	4
4	(Italy) Italo Romagnoli	Fiorentina	4
4	(Italy) Riccardo Isada	Catanzarese	4
4	(Italy) Luigi Pantani	Sanremese	4

== Sources ==
- Almanacco Illustrato del Calcio–La Storia 1898–2004, Panini Edizioni, Modena, September 2005
