= 1922 Coppa Italia final =

1st Coppa Italia final
- Event: 1922 Coppa Italia
Vado	Udinese
1	0
- After extra time
- Date: 16 July 1922
- Venue: Campo di Leo, Vado Ligure
- Referee: Luigi Pasquinelli

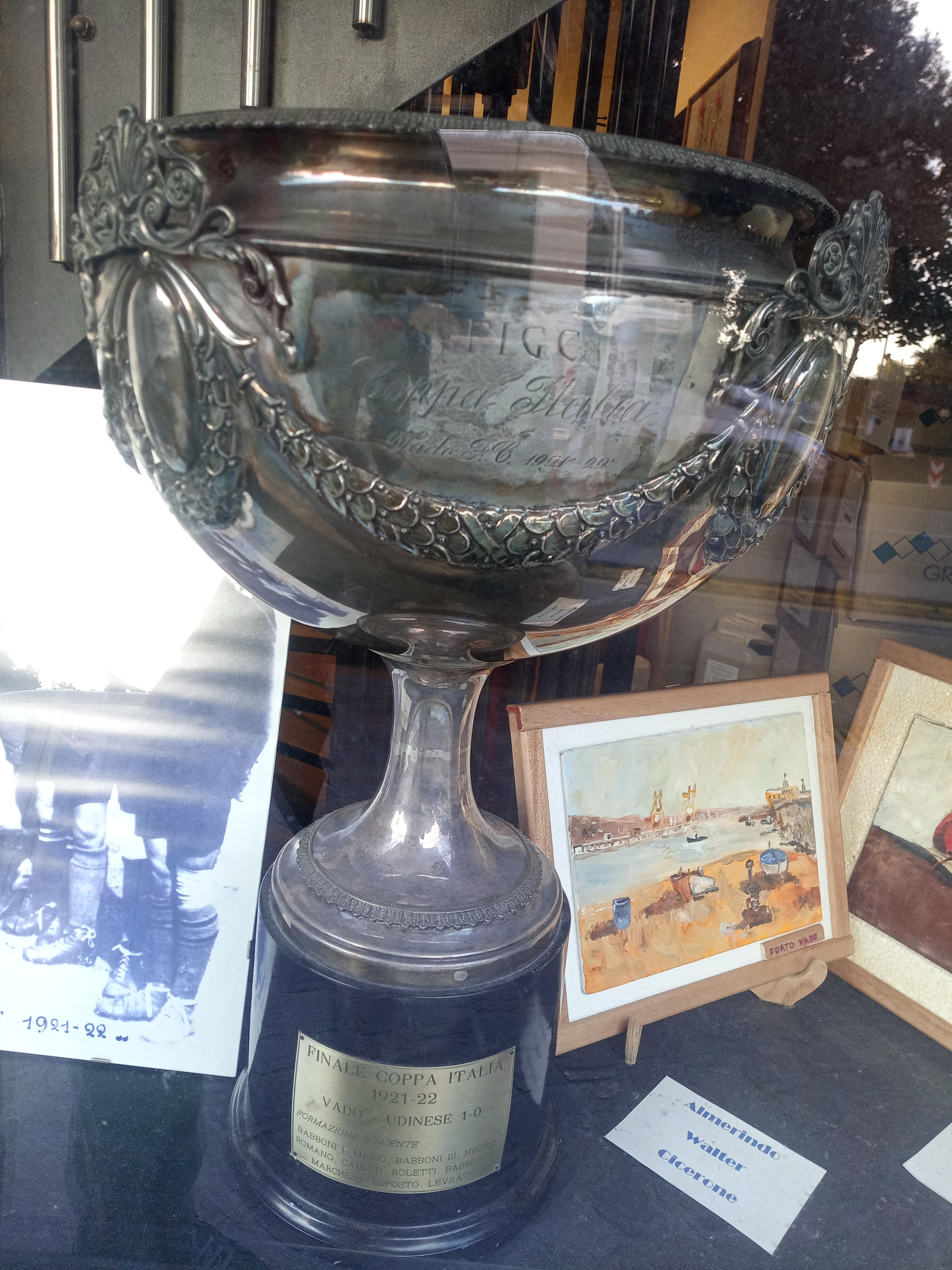
The trophy used for the first Coppa Italia.

The 1922 Coppa Italia final was the inaugural final of the Coppa Italia. The match was played on 16 July 1922 between Vado and Udinese. Vado won 1–0 the first Coppa Italia, the first of the two teams reaching the trophy without playing in the First Division and the only one who never played it.

== Match ==
16 July 1922

Vado	1–0 (a.e.t.)	Udinese
Levratto 118'

Campo di Leo, Vado Ligure
Referee: Luigi Pasquinelli

Vado	Udinese

GK	1	(Italy) Achille Babboni
DF	2	(Italy) Lino Babboni
DF	3	(Italy) Raimondi
MF	4	(Italy) Masio
MF	5	(Italy) Enrico Romano
MF	6	(Italy) Antonio Cabiati
FW	7	(Italy) Roletti
FW	8	(Italy) Giovanni Battista Babboni
FW	9	(Italy) Marchese
FW	10	(Italy) Esposto
FW	11	(Italy) Virgilio Felice Levratto

GK	1	(Italy) Libero Lodolo
DF	2	(Italy) Bertoldi
DF	3	(Italy) Ugo Schiffo
MF	4	(Italy) Enzo Dal Dan
MF	5	(Italy) Berbieri
MF	6	(Italy) Pietro Gerace
FW	7	(Italy) Luigi Tosolini
FW	8	(Italy) Carlo Melchior
FW	9	(Italy) Moretti
FW	10	(Italy) Silvio Semintendi
FW	11	(Italy) Ligugnana
