= Bussaglia =

Bussaglia is an Italian surname. Notable people with the surname include:

- Andrea Bussaglia (born 1997), Italian footballer
- Élise Bussaglia (born 1985), French footballer

== See also ==
- Buscaglia
