= Lucchese Calcio =

Italian football club

Lucchese
- Full name: Lucchese 1905 s.r.l.
- Nickname: Rossoneri (Red-Blacks)
- Founded: 1905
- Ground: Stadio Porta Elisa, Lucca, Italy
- Capacity: 7.386
- Chairman: Make Holding SRL
- Manager: Marco Bernardini
- League: Serie D
Home colours	Away colours	Third colours

Lucchese 1905 s.r.l., or simply Lucchese, is an Italian football club, based in Lucca, Tuscany. The club was first founded in 1905, having last been in Serie A in 1952.

== History ==
=== Foundation ===
The club was founded on 25 May 1905, giving the town of Lucca its first football team. Originally named Lucca Football Club the club was founded by the Vittorio brothers and Guido Mensini. The first large achievement by the club was winning the Goblet of the King during the 1919–20 season, not long after the tournament's foundation. The same season Lucca won the Regional cup of Tuscany.

=== From U.S. Lucchese-Libertas to A.S. Lucchese Libertas ===
==== U.S. Lucchese-Libertas ====
In 1924 the club merged with another local team and changed its name to Unione Sportiva Lucchese-Libertas. During the 1920s, notable players at the club included Ernesto Bonino and Giovanni Moscardini.

The 1930s saw the club promoted to Serie B, and then in 1936, Lucchese won promotion to Serie A, the top league in Italy, where they stayed for three seasons. The club were relegated back to Serie B as World War II started. Prior to the war, players such as Egri Erbstein, Aldo Olivieri and Antonio Perduca were fan's favorites. Lucchese won promotion again to Serie A in 1947 and remained there for 5 seasons.

==== A.S. Lucchese Libertas ====
In 1984 the club changed its name to A.S. Lucchese Libertas.

The club spent also several seasons in Serie B (last 1998–99) and Serie C1, being also coached by Luigi Simoni, UEFA Cup-winning coach with Inter Milan.

In 2008 the club folded due to serious financial issues and was admitted in the Italian bottom (amateur) division Terza Categoria before being declared formally bankrupt in December 2008.

=== From S.S.D. Sporting Lucchese to A.S. Lucchese Libertas 1905 ===
==== S.S.D. Sporting Lucchese ====
A new re-born team called Società Sportiva Dilettantistica Sporting Lucchese was admitted to Serie D to represent the city of Lucca.

In its first season of existence, Sporting Lucchese promptly won the Girone E round of Serie D, thus acquiring the right to take part to the 2009–10 Lega Pro Seconda Divisione.

==== A.S. Lucchese Libertas 1905 ====
After the promotion, the new club took the denomination of Associazione Sportiva Lucchese Libertas 1905 starting with the new season, after the Sporting Lucchese owner acquired the naming and logo rights of the old, original team in a public auction. Lucchese made a second consecutive promotion after finishing as champions of Group B of Lega Pro Seconda Divisione. The club has spent the 2010–11 season in Lega Pro Prima Divisione.

However, in the summer of 2011, Lucchese was excluded from professional football by COVISOC for financial irregularity reasons, and didn't appeal against the decision.

=== From A.S.D. F.C. Lucca 2011 to A.S. Lucchese Libertas 1905 ===
- F.C. Lucca 2011

On 1 August 2011, a new club was founded to represent the city of Lucca: the team was called Associazione Sportiva Dilettantistica Football Club Lucca 2011 and in it was promoted from Eccellenza Tuscany to Serie D at the end of the 2011–12 season.

- F.C. Lucchese 1905

The club changed its name to F.C. Lucchese 1905 soon after being promoted.

- A.S. Lucchese Libertas 1905

In the summer 2013 the club changed his name back to A.S. Lucchese Libertas 1905. On that same season, Lucchese returned to professionalism after winning the Group D of the 2013–14 Serie D, and thus ensuring a spot in the inaugural season of the unified 2014–15 Lega Pro league.

After a struggling season in the 2018–19 Serie C that was hit by more financial issues involving the club, Lucchese failed to submit its application for the 2019–20 Serie C, and was declared bankrupt once again on 1 July 2019.

- S.S.D. Lucchese 1905

Immediately after being excluded from Serie C, a further new incarnation of the club, named as S.S.D. Lucchese 1905, was admitted by the Football Federation to Serie D.

At the end of the 2024–25 season, Lucchese was excluded from Serie C due to financial difficulties.

== Players ==
=== Current squad ===
Note: Flags indicate national team as defined under FIFA eligibility rules; some limited exceptions apply. Players may hold more than one non-FIFA nationality.

No.	Pos.	Nation	Player
1	GK	ITA	Marco Guacci
2	DF	ALB	Maikol Xeka
3	DF	SMR	Tommaso Benvenuti
4	MF	ITA	Francesco Mele
5	DF	ITA	Alessandro Berardi
6	DF	ITA	Salvatore Santeramo
7	MF	ITA	Luca Lombardi
8	MF	ITA	Giacomo Baldari
9	FW	ITA	Federico Dionisi
10	FW	MDA	Dorin Sirbu
11	FW	ITA	Davide Lorusso
12	GK	ITA	Cristian Vannini
14	MF	ITA	Alberto Picchi

No.	Pos.	Nation	Player
16	MF	ITA	Mirco Ferrante
17	MF	ITA	Marco Amadio
18	MF	ITA	Valerio Labriola
19	DF	ITA	Lorenzo Massari
21	MF	ITA	Mattia Suriano
23	DF	ITA	Emiliano Zitelli
24	DF	CRO	Eric Biasiol
27	MF	ITA	Alessandro Olivieri (on loan from Empoli)
33	GK	ITA	Gioele Vespier
66	DF	ITA	Andrea Cadili
77	FW	ALB	Gabriele Kernezo
90	FW	ITA	Martino Ragghianti
99	FW	ITA	Bryan Gioè

== Colors and badge ==
The team's traditional colors are red and black. The team is nicknamed Rossoneri.

== Stadium ==
Their home ground is the Stadio Porta Elisa, which is located on Via dello Stadio in Lucca.

== Honours ==
- Serie B
  - Champions: 1935–36, 1946–47 (Group B)
- Serie C
  - Champions: 1960–61
  - Runners-up: 1945–46, 1977–78
- Serie C1
  - Runners-up: 1989–90
- Serie C2
  - Champions: 1985–86, 2009–10
- Serie D
  - Champions: 1968–69, 2008–09, 2013–14
- Tuscany League Division 1
  - Champions: 1929–30, 1932–33, 1933–34
- Promozione
  - Champions: 1919–20
- Coppa Italia Serie C
  - Champions: 1989–90
