= Stadio Ferruccio Chittolina =

Football stadium in Vado Ligure, Italy

Coordinates: 44°16′40″N 8°25′53″E

- Interactive map of Stadio Ferruccio Chittolina
- Location: Vado Ligure
- Capacity: 2,000

Construction
- Opened: August 20, 1978
- Structural engineer: Giovanni Carlo

The Stadio Ferruccio Chittolina is a football stadium situated in Vado Ligure, the home of Vado.

The stadium was inaugurated on August 20, 1978, with a friendly match between Vado and Genoa that replaced the "Campo delle Traversine" with the "Campo di Leo" which hosted the 1922 Coppa Italia Final.

The Stadio Ferrucchio Chittolina was named in honour of Giuseppe "Ferruccio" Chittolina, the Vado goalkeeper who died on April 7, 1946, as a result of an accident that occurred during a championship match on the Campo delle Traversine (which was later also named after him).
