= Michele Messina =

Italian footballer

Personal information
- Date of birth: 10 March 1996 (age 30)
- Place of birth: Vimercate, Italy
- Height: 1.83 m (6 ft 0 in)
- Position: Defender

Team information
- Current team: Vado
- Number: 31

Youth career
- –2015: Atalanta

Senior career*
Years	Team	Apps	(Gls)
2015–2018	Atalanta	0	(0)
2015–2017	→ Parma (loan)	33	(2)
2017–2018	→ Pro Piacenza (loan)	20	(0)
2018–2019	Viterbese Catrense	7	(0)
2019	→ Triestina (loan)	1	(0)
2019–2020	Rimini	5	(0)
2020–2021	Ghiviborgo	27	(1)
2021	Aglianese	0	(0)
2021	Tritium	14	(3)
2021–2023	Ponte San Pietro	41	(2)
2023–2024	Brusaporto	33	(5)
2024–2025	Sant'Angelo	29	(2)
2025–	Vado	18	(1)
- * Club domestic league appearances and goals as of 25 June 2026

Michele Messina (born 10 March 1996) is an Italian football player who plays as a defender for Serie C Group B club Vado.

== Club career ==
=== Atalanta ===
==== Loan to Parma ====
On 1 August 2015, Messina was loaned to Serie D side Parma on a 2-season loan deal. On 13 September he made his Serie D debut for Parma as a substitute replacing Lorenzo Adorni in the 84th minute of a 2–1 home win over Villafranca Veronese. On 16 September he played his first entire match for Parma, a 5–0 away win over Fortis Juventus. On 6 December he scored his first goal for Parma in the 11th minute of a 3–2 home win over Ravenna. On 28 February 2016, Messina scored his second goal in the 74th minute of a 1–0 home win over Lentigione Calcio. On 22 May he was sent off with a double yellow card in the 90th minute of a 2–2 home draw against Sambenedettese. Messina ended his first season at Parma with 25 appearances, 2 goals and 2 assists, and with the promotion in Serie C.

On 3 September he made his professional debut in Serie C for Parma as a substitute replacing Desiderio Garufo in the 60th minute of a 1–0 home win over Lumezzane. On 10 September he played hs first entire match for Parma in Serie C, a 0–0 away draw against Santarcangelo. Messina ended his second season at Parma with only 8 appearances, only 1 as a starter and the promotion in Serie B after the play-off, in total he made 33 appearances, 2 goals and 2 assists.

==== Loan to Pro Piacenza ====
On 20 July 2017, Messina was signed by Serie C side Pro Piacenza on aseason-long loan deal. On 30 July he made his debut for Pro Picenza in a 4–1 away defeat against Vicenza in the first round of Coppa Italia, he played the entire match. On 3 September he made his Serie C debut for Pro Piacenza as a substitute replacing Matteo Abbate in the 74th minute of a 1–0 away defeat against Carrarese. On 10 September he played his first entire match for Pro Piacenza in Serie C, a 1–1 home draw against Alessandria. Messina ended his season-long loan to Pro Piacenza with 21 appearances, 11 as a starter and 1 assist.

=== Viterbese Castrense ===
On 7 July 2018, Messina joined to Serie C club Viterbese Castrense on an undisclosed fee and with a 2-year contract. On 29 July he made his debut for Viterbese Castrense as a substitute replacing Diego Cenciarelli in the 85th minute of a 1–0 home draw against Rende in the first round of Coppa Italia. On 6 November he made his league debut for the club as a substitute replacing Francesco De Giorgi in the 74th minute of a 2–1 home defeat against Sicula Leonzio. In the first half of the season he made only 6 appearances, all as a substitute and he stayed an unused substitute 9 times.

==== Loan to Triestina ====
On 30 January 2019, Messina joined Triestina on loan with a purchase option. On 5 May he made his debut for the club in a 1–0 away defeat against Fano, he was replaced by Andrea Marzola after 82 minutes. This was also his only appearances that he made for Triestina.

=== Rimini ===
On 2 September 2019 he moved to Serie C club Rimini.

== Career statistics ==
=== Club ===
As of 25 October 2019

Club	Season	League			Cup		Europe		Other		Total	
Club	Season	League	Apps	Goals	Apps	Goals	Apps	Goals	Apps	Goals	Apps	Goals
Parma (loan)	2015–16	Serie D	25	2	—		—		—		25	2
Parma (loan)	2016–17	Serie C	8	0	0	0	—		—		8	0
Pro Piacenza (loan)	2017–18	Serie C	20	0	1	0	—		—		21	0
Viterbese Castrense	2018–19	Serie C	6	0	2	0	—		—		8	0
Triestina (loan)	2018–19	Serie C	1	0	0	0	—		—		1	0
Viterbese Castrense	2019–20	Serie C	1	0	1	0	—		—		2	0
Rimini	2019–20	Serie C	0	0	0	0	—		—		0	0
Career total			61	2	4	0	—		—		65	2
