= Buscaglia =

Buscaglia is an Italian-language surname. Notable people with the name include:

- Carlo Buscaglia (1909–1981), Italian footballer
- Carlo Emanuele Buscaglia (1915–1944), Italian aviator
- Charlie Buscaglia (born 1979), American basketball coach
- Edgardo Buscaglia, Italian academic
- Guido Buscaglia (born 1996), Argentine swimmer
- José Buscaglia Guillermety (born 1938), Puerto Rican sculptor
- Leo Buscaglia (1924–1998), American author and motivational speaker
- Marcos Buscaglia, Argentine economist
- Maurizio Buscaglia (born 1969), Italian basketball coach
- Pietro Buscaglia (1911–1997), Italian footballer
