= Virgilio Levratto =

Italian footballer (1904–1968)

Personal information
- Full name: Virgilio Felice Levratto
- Date of birth: 26 October 1904
- Place of birth: Carcare, Italy
- Date of death: 18 September 1968 (aged 63)
- Place of death: Genoa, Italy
- Position: Forward

Senior career*
Years	Team	Apps	(Gls)
1919–1924	Vado	50	(53)
1924–1925	Verona	20	(15)
1925–1932	Genoa	188	(86)
1932–1934	Ambrosiana-Inter	63	(25)
1934–1936	Lazio	50	(8)
1936–1940	Savona	46	(24)
1940–1941	Stabia	?	(?)
1941–1942	Cavese	?	(?)

International career
1924–1928	Italy	28	(11)

Managerial career
- 1936–1937: Savona
- 1938–1939: Savona
- 1940–1941: Cavese
- 1941–1942: Stabia
- 1942–1943: Colleferro
- 1945–1947: Savona
- 1947–1949: Messina
- 1949–1951: Arsenale Messina
- 1951–1952: Lecce
- 1952–1953: Savona
- 1958–1959: Finale
- 1962–1963: Cuneo
- 1965–1968: Nolese
Medal record
Italy
Summer Olympics
Bronze medal – third place	1928 Amsterdam
Central European International Cup
Gold medal – first place	1927–30 Central European International Cup
- * Club domestic league appearances and goals

Virgilio Felice Levratto (Italian pronunciation: [virˈdʒiːljo feˈliːtʃe leˈvratto]; 26 October 1904 – 18 September 1968) was an Italian association football player and later a coach, who played as a striker.

== Club career ==
Levratto was born in Carcare. Throughout his club career, he played for F.C. Vado (where he won his first Coppa Italia title in 1922, scoring a decisive goal in the final) and also played for Hellas Verona F.C., Genoa C.F.C. (appearing in 148 matches and scoring 84 goals), Inter Milan in 1932, and S.S. Lazio in 1934. He later played with Savona in Serie C, and closed his career in Serie D with Cavese.

== International career ==
With the Italy national football team, Levratto obtained 28 international caps, scoring 11 goals. He played in the 1924 Summer Olympics and won a bronze medal at the 1928 Summer Olympics. & won the 1927–30 Central European International Cup.

== Style of play ==
A well-known striker, Levratto was also known as "Lo Sfondareti" (The net-tearer) for his famous powerful shot.

== Managerial career ==
In the 1950s, Levratto coached Savona, Messina, U.S. Lecce and was assistant coach for Fulvio Bernardini at ACF Fiorentina during the 1955–56 season.

== In popular culture ==
In 1940s, popular singers Quartetto Cetra dedicated Virgilio a song, titled "Che centrattacco!" ("What a striker!").

== Career statistics ==
=== International ===
Appearances and goals by national team and year
National team	Year	Apps	Goals
Italy	1924	5	0
Italy	1925	2	2
Italy	1926	3	3
Italy	1927	7	2
Italy	1928	11	4
Total		28	11

Scores and results list Italy's goal tally first, score column indicates score after each Levratto goal.

List of international goals scored by Virgilio Levratto
No.	Date	Venue	Opponent	Score	Result	Competition	Ref.
1	22 March 1925	Juventus Stadium, Turin, Italy	France	3–0	7–0	Friendly	
2	22 March 1925	Juventus Stadium, Turin, Italy	France	7–0	7–0	Friendly	
3	18 July 1926	Stockholm Olympic Stadium, Stockholm, Sweden	Sweden	1–3	3–5	Friendly	
4	18 July 1926	Stockholm Olympic Stadium, Stockholm, Sweden	Sweden	3–4	3–5	Friendly	
5	28 October 1926	Stadion Letná, Prague, Czech Republic	Czechoslovakia	1–1	1–3	Friendly	
6	17 April 1927	Juventus Stadium, Turin, Italy	Portugal	1–0	3–1	Friendly	
7	17 April 1927	Juventus Stadium, Turin, Italy	Portugal	3–0	3–1	Friendly	
8	29 May 1928	Olympic Stadium, Amsterdam, Netherlands	France	–	4–3	1928 Summer Olympics	
9	4 June 1928	Olympic Stadium, Amsterdam, Netherlands	Spain	6–1	7–1	1928 Summer Olympics	
10	4 June 1928	Olympic Stadium, Amsterdam, Netherlands	Spain	7–1	7–1	1928 Summer Olympics	
11	7 June 1928	Olympic Stadium, Amsterdam, Netherlands	Uruguay	2–3	2–3	1928 Summer Olympics	

== Honours ==
=== Club ===
Vado

- Coppa Italia: 1922

Savona

- Serie C: 1939–40

=== International ===
Italy

- Central European International Cup: 1927–30
- Summer Olympics: Bronze 1928
