= Zaccaria Hamlili =

Italian footballer

Personal information
- Date of birth: 27 April 1991 (age 35)
- Place of birth: Manerbio, Italy
- Height: 1.70 m (5 ft 7 in)
- Position: Midfielder

Team information
- Current team: Vado
- Number: 28

Youth career
- –2009: Brescia

Senior career*
| Years | Team | Apps | (Gls) |
| 2009–2013 | Virtus Entella | 106 | (3) |
| 2013–2014 | Cuneo | 27 | (3) |
| 2014–2015 | Forlì | 25 | (1) |
| 2015–2016 | Ancona | 28 | (0) |
| 2016–2018 | Pistoiese | 65 | (5) |
| 2018–2021 | Bari | 55 | (3) |
| 2021 | → Gubbio (loan) | 15 | (0) |
| 2021–2024 | Monopoli | 74 | (1) |
| 2024–2026 | Livorno | 61 | (1) |
| 2026– | Vado | 0 | (0) |
- * Club domestic league appearances and goals as of 30 April 2026

Zaccaria Hamlili (born 27 April 1991) is an Italian professional footballer who plays as a midfielder for Serie C Group B club Vado.

== Club career ==
On 28 January 2021, Hamlili was loaned to Gubbio for the rest of the season.

On 30 August 2021 he signed a three-year contract with Monopoli.
