= Mario Gianni =

Italian footballer and manager

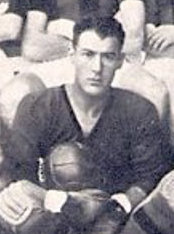

Personal information
- Full name: Mario Domenico Vittorio Augusto Gianni
- Date of birth: 19 November 1902
- Place of birth: Genoa, Italy
- Date of death: 13 July 1967 (aged 64)
- Place of death: Milan, Italy
- Position: Goalkeeper

Senior career*
Years	Team	Apps	(Gls)
1919–1924	Pisa	57	(0)
1924–1936	Bologna	346	(0)
1937–1938	Budrio		

International career
1927–1933	Italy	6	(0)

Managerial career
- 1937–1938: Budrio
- 1938–1939: Molinella
- 1939–1940: Prato
- 1940–1941: Imola
- 1941–1942: Cesena
- 1942–1943: Carrarese
- 1945: Cesena
Medal record
Italy
Central European International Cup
Silver medal – second place	1931-32 Central European International Cup
- * Club domestic league appearances and goals

Mario Gianni (Italian: [ˈmaːrjo ˈdʒanni]; 19 November 1902 – July 1967) was an Italian professional football player and coach, who played as a goalkeeper. He was nicknamed Gatto Magico (Magic Cat) for his acrobatic skill.

== Career ==
Gianni played most of his career with Bologna, where he won three Italian Championships in 1924–25, 1928–29, 1935–36.

Gianni appeared for the Italy national football team on six occasions between 1927 and 1933, also captaining the team once. He played the very last match of the 1931-32 campaign, as Gianpiero Combi was unavailable. Earning a Silver medal with his national team.

== Honours ==
=== Player ===
Bologna

- Italian Championship: 1924–25, 1928–29, 1935–36
- Mitropa Cup: 1932, 1934

== International ==
Italy

- Central European International Cup: Runner-up: 1931-32

=== Coach ===
Molinella

- Serie C: 1938–39

Carrarese

- Serie C: 1942–43
