= Felice Gasperi =

Italian footballer

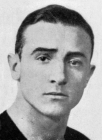

Personal information
- Date of birth: December 26, 1903
- Place of birth: Bologna, Italy
- Date of death: 23 May 1982 (aged 78)
- Place of death: Città Sant'Angelo, Italy
- Position: Defender

Senior career*
Years	Team	Apps	(Gls)
1924–1938	Bologna	382	(2)

International career
1928–1933	Italy	6	(0)
Medal record
Italy
Summer Olympics
Bronze medal – third place	1928 Amsterdam
Central European International Cup
Silver medal – second place	1931–32 Central European International Cup
- * Club domestic league appearances and goals

Felice Gasperi (Italian pronunciation: [feˈliːtʃe ˈɡasperi]; 26 December 1903 – 23 May 1982) was an Italian footballer who played as a defender. He competed with Italy in the 1928 Summer Olympics.

== International career ==
With Italy, Gasperi won the Olympic bronze medal at the 1928 Summer Olympics in the men's football team competition, but because of a disputed game in some accounts of that history, his name is not listed among the medal winners. What is without a doubt though is, that he did start in two matches for Italy in the silver winning 1931-32 Central European International Cup campaign.

== Honours ==
=== Club ===
Bologna

- Italian Football Championship: 1924–25, 1928–29, 1935–36, 1936–37

=== International ===
Italy

- Central European International Cup: Runner-up: 1931–32
- Summer Olympics: Bronze Medal 1928
