= Raffaele Sansone =

Italian footballer and coach (1910-1994)

Personal information
- Date of birth: 20 September 1910
- Place of birth: Montevideo, Uruguay
- Date of death: 11 September 1994 (aged 83)
- Place of death: Bologna, Italy
- Position: Midfielder

Senior career*
Years	Team	Apps	(Gls)
1931	Peñarol	?	(?)
1931–44	Bologna	52	(9)
1933–34	Peñarol	?	(?)
1934–44	Bologna	239	(32)
1945–46	Napoli	1	(0)

International career
1932	Italy	3	(0)

Managerial career
- 1945–46: Napoli
- 1951: Bologna
- 1952–53: Bari
Medal record
Italy
Central European International Cup
Silver medal – second place	1931-32 Central European International Cup
- * Club domestic league appearances and goals

Raffaele Sansone (Italian pronunciation: [raffaˈɛːle sanˈsoːne]; 20 September 1910 – 11 September 1994) was a football player and coach from Montevideo, Uruguay, who played as a midfielder. Born in Uruguay, he played for the Italy national team.

== Club career ==
After beginning his career in Uruguay with Peñarol, Sansone spent over a decade playing club football for Italian club Bologna, winning the Serie A title four times, and the Mitropa Cup twice. After that he moved to Napoli where he played one game before retiring; he then became a manager.

== International career ==
Sansone was also called up by the Italy national football team as an oriundo; he was allowed to play for Italy due to his parents being from Salerno. He turned out for the azzurri a total of three times, two of these times as starter in the silver medal 1931–32 Central European International Cup campaign.

== Honours ==
=== Club ===
Bologna

- Mitropa Cup: 1932, 1934
- Serie A: 1935–36, 1936–37, 1938–39, 1940–41

=== International ===
Italy

- Central European International Cup: Runner-up: 1931–32
