= 1922 Coppa Italia =

Tournament details
- Country: Italy
- Dates: 2 April – 16 July 1922
- Teams: 38

Final positions
- Champions: Vado (1st title)
- Runners-up: Udinese

Tournament statistics
- Matches played: 37
- Goals scored: 112 (3.03 per match)
- Top goal scorer: Ernesto Bonino (6 goals)

The 1922 Coppa Italia was the first edition of the national domestic tournament cup in Italian football. Thirty-seven teams entered the tournament, which ran between 2 April and 16 July 1922. Vado win in the final, the only national domestic title in its history.

== Background ==
Proposals for an Italian football cup were made many times before WWI, without a tournament coming to pass. In 1921, when all major clubs resigned from the FIGC to establish the country's first football league, FIGC as a response decided to create a cup competition to recognize the championship.

The fixture assignments for the first Coppa Italia were difficult, given the number of teams admitted to the tournament (37), which did not allow for a normal knockout format. As a result, it was necessary to award several teams with byes. Almost every team was from Northern Italy, with Livorno being the southernmost club allowed to participate.

With the victory of the outsider Vado which competed in the Promozione, the Ligurians became the first club to win the country's premier national domestic tournament cup. The club won the competition despite not playing in the top division; an achievement that has only ever been equaled on one other occasion in the tournament's history, by Napoli in the 1961–62 Coppa Italia.

The cup was not considered a distinguished tournament at the time, as the top clubs did not take part and only clubs from Northern Italy participating. Many of the participating clubs withdrew from the competition to avoid disrupting their regular season.

Reunification of the Football Association and the Football League caused the tournament not to resume until the 1935-36 edition.

== Participating teams ==
The teams retired from the competition before the first round are marked in italics.

=== Prima Categoria and Coppa Giulia ===
Piedmont
- Novese
- Pastore
- US Torinese
- Valenzana

Ligury

- Rivarolese
- Calcio Sestrese
- Speranza Genoa
- Spes Genova
Lombardy
- A.C. Libertas
- Enotria Goliardo
- Juventus Italia
- Saronno
- Trevigliese

Veneto

- Treviso
- Udinese
Emilia
- Carpi
- Parma
- US Mantovana
- Virtus Bologna

Tuscany

- C.S. Firenze
- Libertas Firenze
- Lucchese
- Pro Livorno
Venezia Giulia

The most important Julian teams took part in a regional tournament called "Coppa Giulia", separated from the national Prima Categoria

- Edera Trieste
- Triestina

=== Promozione ===
Piedmont
- Aeronautica Torino
- Vercellesi Erranti

Ligury

- Fiorente Genova
- Molassana Boero
- Vado
Lombardy
- Crema
- RC Codogno
- Fanfulla

Veneto

- Union Feltrese
Emilia
- Forlì F.C.
- Casalecchio

Tuscany

- Audace Livorno

== First round ==
Treviso received a bye due to a drawing; Libertas Firenze and Pro Livorno received byes due to fixture congestion.

Home team	Score	Away team
Audace Livorno	0-2	Molassana
Casalecchio	0-2	Carpi
Crema	4-1	Codogno
Fanfulla	2-1	Libertas Milano
Forti e Liberti Forlì	3-0	Mantovana
Juventus Italia	2-0	Enotria Genova
Lucchese	9-0	CS Firenze
Novese	6-0	Aeronautica Torino
Rivarolese	2-0	Sestrese
Spes Genova	0-1	Speranza Savona
Trevigliese	0-1 (aet)	Saronno
Triestina	0-2	Edera Trieste
Udinese	4–0	Feltrese
Vado	4-3 (aet)	Fiorente
Valenzana	2-1	Pastore Torino
Vercellese	0-1	US Torinese
Virtus Bologna	1-0	Parma

== Second round ==
Libertas Firenze and Pro Livorno received byes due to fixture congestion.

Home team	Score	Away team
Crema	1-2	Speranza Savona
Fanfulla	1-4	Novese
Forti e Liberti Forlì	4-0	Treviso
Juventus Italia	3-0	US Torinese
Lucchese	5-0	Rivarolese
Vado	5-1	Molassana
Valenzana	1-0	Saronno
Virtus Bologna	1-0	Carpi
Edera Trieste	0-4	Udinese

== Third round ==
Libertas Firenze, Novese, Pro Livorno and Speranza Savona received byes due to fixture congestion; Udinese received a bye due to the absence of competitors.

Home team	Score	Away team
Lucchese	4-0	Virtus Bologna
Vado	2-0	Juventus Italia
Valenzana	3-0	Forti e Liberti Forlì

== Quarter-finals ==
Home team	Score	Away team
Libertas Firenze	2-0	Valenzana
Novese	0-2	Udinese
Speranza Savona	1-2	Lucchese
Pro Livorno	0-1	Vado

== Semi-finals ==
Home team	Score	Away team
Vado	1-0 (aet)	Libertas Firenze
Udinese	1–0	Lucchese

== Final ==
16 July 1922

Vado	1–0 (a.e.t.)	Udinese
Levratto 118'

Campo di Leo, Vado Ligure
Referee: Luigi Pasquinelli

== Top goalscorers ==
Rank	Player	Club	Goals
1	(Italy) Ernesto Bonino	Lucchese	6
2	(Italy) Virgilio Levratto	Vado	5
3	(Italy) Gian Antonio Maggi	Juventus Italia	4
