= Antonio Perduca =

Italian footballer (born 1905)

Personal information
- Date of birth: 7 May 1905
- Place of birth: Casteggio, Italy
- Height: 1.72 m (5 ft 7 1/2 in)
- Position: Defender

Senior career*
Years	Team	Apps	(Gls)
1924–1927	Pavia		
1927–1928	Torino	0	(0)
1928–1930	Atalanta	55	(0)
1930–1931	Legnano	34	(1)
1931–1932	Ambrosiana-Inter	28	(0)
1932–1933	Bari	34	(1)
1933–1938	Lucchese	110	(1)
1938–1940	Pavese		
- * Club domestic league appearances and goals

Antonio Perduca (born 7 May 1905, died unknown) was an Italian professional football player.
