= 1935–36 Austrian football championship =

25th season of top-tier football league in Austria

Austrian football championship
- Season: 1935-36

Statistics of Austrian first league in the 1935–36 season.

== Overview ==
This was the 25th season of 1. Liga, contested by 12 teams: the top 11 from last season, and the winner of the 2. Liga play-off (Favoritner AC).

== League standings ==
| Pos | Team | Pld | W | D | L | GF | GA | GD | Pts | Relegation |
|---|---|---|---|---|---|---|---|---|---|---|
| 1 | SK Admira Wien | 22 | 17 | 3 | 2 | 77 | 36 | +41 | 37 | |
| 2 | First Vienna FC | 22 | 14 | 4 | 4 | 48 | 25 | +23 | 32 | |
| 3 | SK Rapid Wien | 22 | 12 | 2 | 8 | 58 | 40 | +18 | 26 | |
| 4 | FC Wien | 22 | 9 | 8 | 5 | 52 | 45 | +7 | 26 | |
| 5 | SC Wacker Wien | 22 | 8 | 6 | 8 | 41 | 48 | −7 | 22 | |
| 6 | Wiener Sportclub | 22 | 8 | 5 | 9 | 32 | 35 | −3 | 21 | |
| 7 | FK Austria Wien | 22 | 8 | 4 | 10 | 44 | 42 | +2 | 20 (Note: One fixture was unplayed (FK Austria Wien vs SC Libertas Wien); this game was recorded as a 0-0 LOSS against both sides, which explains why there appear to be two more losses than victories.) | |
| 8 | Favoritner AC | 22 | 9 | 1 | 12 | 35 | 57 | −22 | 19 | |
| 9 | Floridsdorfer AC | 22 | 6 | 4 | 12 | 44 | 52 | −8 | 16 | |
| 10 | SC Libertas Wien | 22 | 6 | 4 | 12 | 37 | 46 | −9 | 16 | |
| 11 | Hakoah Vienna | 22 | 6 | 3 | 13 | 36 | 58 | −22 | 15 | |
| 12 | Wiener AC | 22 | 5 | 2 | 15 | 37 | 57 | −20 | 12 | Relegated to 2.Liga |

Source: rsssf.com
Notes:

Wiener AC were replaced by Post SV, the winner of the 2.Liga play-off.

== Results ==
| Home \ Away | ADM | AUS | FAV | FIR | FLO | HAK | LIB | RAP | WAK | WIE | WAC | SPO |
|---|---|---|---|---|---|---|---|---|---|---|---|---|
| SK Admira Wien | | 1–0 | 8–3 | 2–1 | 3–3 | 4–1 | 4–0 | 6–5 | 5–0 | 3–0 | 7–2 | 2–2 |
| FK Austria Wien | 2–3 | | 2–2 | 2–2 | 5–1 | 2–1 | 0–0 | 0–2 | 4–0 | 1–1 | 4–1 | 0–2 |
| Favoritner AC | 1–2 | 0–3 | | 1–0 | 2–5 | 3–2 | 0–5 | 1–5 | 5–3 | 3–5 | 2–1 | 0–1 |
| First Vienna | 2–2 | 4–0 | 3–0 | | 3–1 | 2–2 | 4–2 | 2–1 | 2–1 | 1–1 | 2–1 | 3–2 |
| Floridsdorfer AC | 2–3 | 2–3 | 1–3 | 0–1 | | 2–1 | 2–0 | 3–2 | 4–5 | 1–3 | 2–1 | 2–2 |
| Hakoah Vienna | 3–2 | 3–1 | 5–1 | 3–0 | 1–5 | | 2–1 | 0–1 | 3–4 | 1–2 | 0–0 | 3–2 |
| SC Libertas | 0–4 | 4–2 | 2–3 | 1–5 | 2–2 | 5–0 | | 1–2 | 1–1 | 1–5 | 0–2 | 1–1 |
| SK Rapid Wien | 2–4 | 2–3 | 1–0 | 1–2 | 3–1 | 6–0 | 1–2 | | 3–3 | 5–2 | 5–3 | 3–1 |
| SC Wacker | 1–2 | 1–0 | 1–0 | 0–2 | 1–0 | 2–2 | 0–3 | 2–2 | | 1–1 | 2–0 | 2–1 |
| FC Wien | 2–4 | 3–3 | 1–2 | 2–0 | 3–3 | 4–2 | 2–2 | 1–3 | 5–4 | | 4–4 | 3–0 |
| Wiener AC | 4–2 | 2–5 | 0–1 | 0–4 | 3–2 | 5–0 | 3–1 | 2–3 | 1–4 | 1–2 | | 0–3 |
| Wiener Sportclub | 0–4 | 3–1 | 1–2 | 0–3 | 2–0 | 4–1 | 1–3 | 1–0 | 1–1 | 0–0 | 2–1 | |

Legend: Blue = home team win; Yellow = draw; Red = away team win.
