= 1926–27 Coppa Italia =

Tournament details
- Country: Italy
- Dates: 11 Oct 1926 – 29 June 1927
- Teams: 120

Final positions
- Champions: none

Tournament statistics
- Matches played: 79
- Goals scored: 379 (4.8 per match)
- Top goal scorer: none

The 1926–27 Coppa Italia was the second edition of the national domestic tournament cup in Italian football. The competition was played four years after the inaugural tournament in 1922. It was abandoned in round 32 due to fixture congestion.

== First round ==
=== Zone A ===
Home team	Score	Away team
Acqui	1-4	Casale
Internazionale	14-0	Acciaierie e Ferriere Novi
Cremonese	2-1	Crema
Fiorente Genova	2-2	Genovese
Lancia Torino	0-2	Spes Genova

Replay match

Home team	Score	Away team
Genovese	2-0 (aet)	Fiorente Genova

=== Zone B ===
Home team	Score	Away team
Bologna	5-1	Casalecchio
Carraresi Padova	0-5	Forti e Liberi Forlì
Fiumana	5-0 *	Fiume
Hellas Verona	7-2	Libertas Venezia
Piacenza	4-1	Panaro Modena
Treviso	3-0	Venezia

* The match annulled as referee did not arrive.

Replay match

Home team	Score	Away team
Fiumana	1-0 (aet)	Fiume

=== Zone C ===
Home team	Score	Away team
Bagnolese	10-1	Cagliari
Italia Ancona	2-0	Viareggio
Pistoiese	1-0	Fortitudo Roma
Savoia	np.	Ideale Bari

np.= not played

== Second round ==
50 clubs are added.

Home team	Score	Away team
Italia Padova	3-4	Monza
Hellas Verona	1-1 (aet)	Biellese
Vado	np.	Fiumana
Genovese	3-1	Vogherese
Reggiana	6-3	Corniglianese
Andrea Doria	4-2	Dolo
Milan	7-1	Rivarolese
Cento	0-15	Juventus
Valenzana	0-7	Internazionale
Vola Genova	3-0	Dop. Ferroviario Trieste
Canottieri Lecco	6-0	Entella
US Milanese	9-2	Abbiategrasso
Vigevanesi	2-0	Trevigliese
Pro Vercelli	3-0	Sampierdarenese
Spezia	2-3 (aet)	Casale
Speranza Savona	0-2	Modena
Varese	0-2	Castelbolognese
Sestese Sesto Calende	4-1	Brescia
Forti e Liberi Forlì	2-0	Tigullio
Fanfulla	1-3	Gallaratese
Mantova	1-3	Genoa
Saronno	3-1	Spes Genova
Torino	9-0	Piacenza
Sestrese	4-2	Officine Meccaniche
Alessandria	17-2	AC Bologna
Edera Trieste	2-1	Savona
Legnano	0-1	Bologna
Oderzo	1-2	Carpi
Pro Palazzolo	4-2	Petrarca Padova
Padova	5-2	Derthona
Grion Pola	0-3	Novara
Monfalcone	0-2	Stelvio Olona

Replay match

Home team	Score	Away team
Hellas Verona	5-0	Biellese

np.= not played

== Third round ==
29 clubs are added.

Home team	Score	Away team
Faenza	3-1	Bagnolese
Pistoiese	8-0	US Romana
Forti e Liberi Forlì	1-2	Andrea Doria
Parma	0-2	Juventus
Baracca Lugo	11-0	Italia Ancona
Pro Patria	1-0	Casale
Cremonese	2-0	Udinese
Vola Genova	2-0	Zara
Triestina	3-1	Gallaratese
Saronno	2-0	Enrico Toti Livorno
Novara	2-3	SPAL
Reggiana	9-1	Stelvio Olona
Ponziana	1-1 (aet) *	Monza
Pro Vercelli	7-2	Modena
Sestrese	2-0	FBC Roma
Padova	4-0	Castelbolognese
Vigevanesi	4-1	Alba Audace
Hellas Verona	2-0	Juventus Massa
Carpi	4-0	US Milanese
Genoa	4-2	Internazionale
Torino	11-0	Pro Palazzolo
Imolese	1-3	Treviso
Carrarese	4-0	Russi
Sestri Levante	1-0	Terni
Edera Trieste	2-0	Arona
Castelfranco	0-1	Genovese
GEA Firenze	0-2	Milan
Canottieri Lecco	np.	Scafatese
Vicenza	np.	Anconitana
Alessandria	np.	Bologna

* Not played repeat.

np.= not played

== Round of 32 ==
Home team	Score	Away team
Baracca Lugo	1-0	Vola Genova
Pro Vercelli	3-2	Andrea Doria
Carpi	4-1	Carrarese
Pro Patria	1-1 (aet)	Genoa
Pistoiese	np.	Triestina
Saronno	np.	Treviso
Sestrese	np.	Torino
Reggiana	np.	Sestese Sesto Calende
Liberty Bari	np.	Hellas Verona
Padova	np.	Genovese
Milan	np.	Juventus
Sestri Levante	np.	Cremonese
SPAL	np.	winner of Canottieri Lecco - Scafatese match
Edera Trieste	np.	winner of Alessandria - Bologna match
Faenza	np.	winner of Vicenza - Anconitana match
winner of Ponziana - Monza match	np.	Vigevanesi

np.= not played

The tournament abandoned due to fixture congestion.
