= Mario Bò =

Italian footballer (1912–2003)

Personal information
- Date of birth: 4 December 1912
- Place of birth: Savona, Italy
- Date of death: 4 December 2003 (aged 91)
- Place of death: Turin, Italy
- Height: 1.66 m (5 ft 5 1/2 in)
- Position: Midfielder

Senior career*
Years	Team	Apps	(Gls)
1931–1939	Torino	188	(41)
1939–1941	Juventus	38	(11)
1941–1942	Genova 1893	10	(2)
1942–1943	Ambrosiana-Inter	12	(3)
1943–1946	Juventus		
1946–1950	Fossanese		
- * Club domestic league appearances and goals

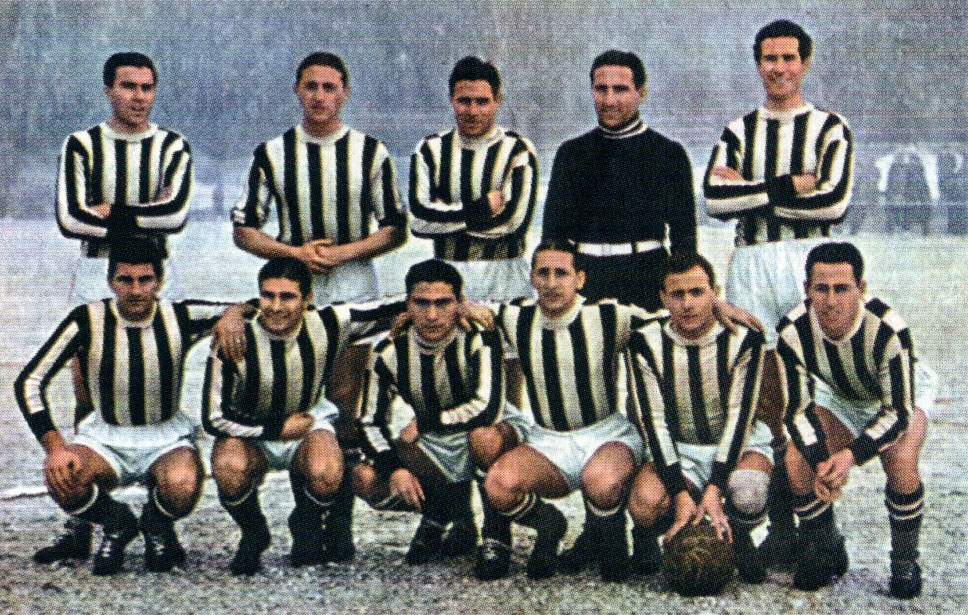
Juventus 1940-1941.jpg

Mario Bò (born 4 December 1912 in Savona; died 4 December 2003 in Turin) was an Italian professional football player.

== Honours ==
- Coppa Italia winner: 1935/36.
