= Pasquale Parodi =

Italian footballer and manager

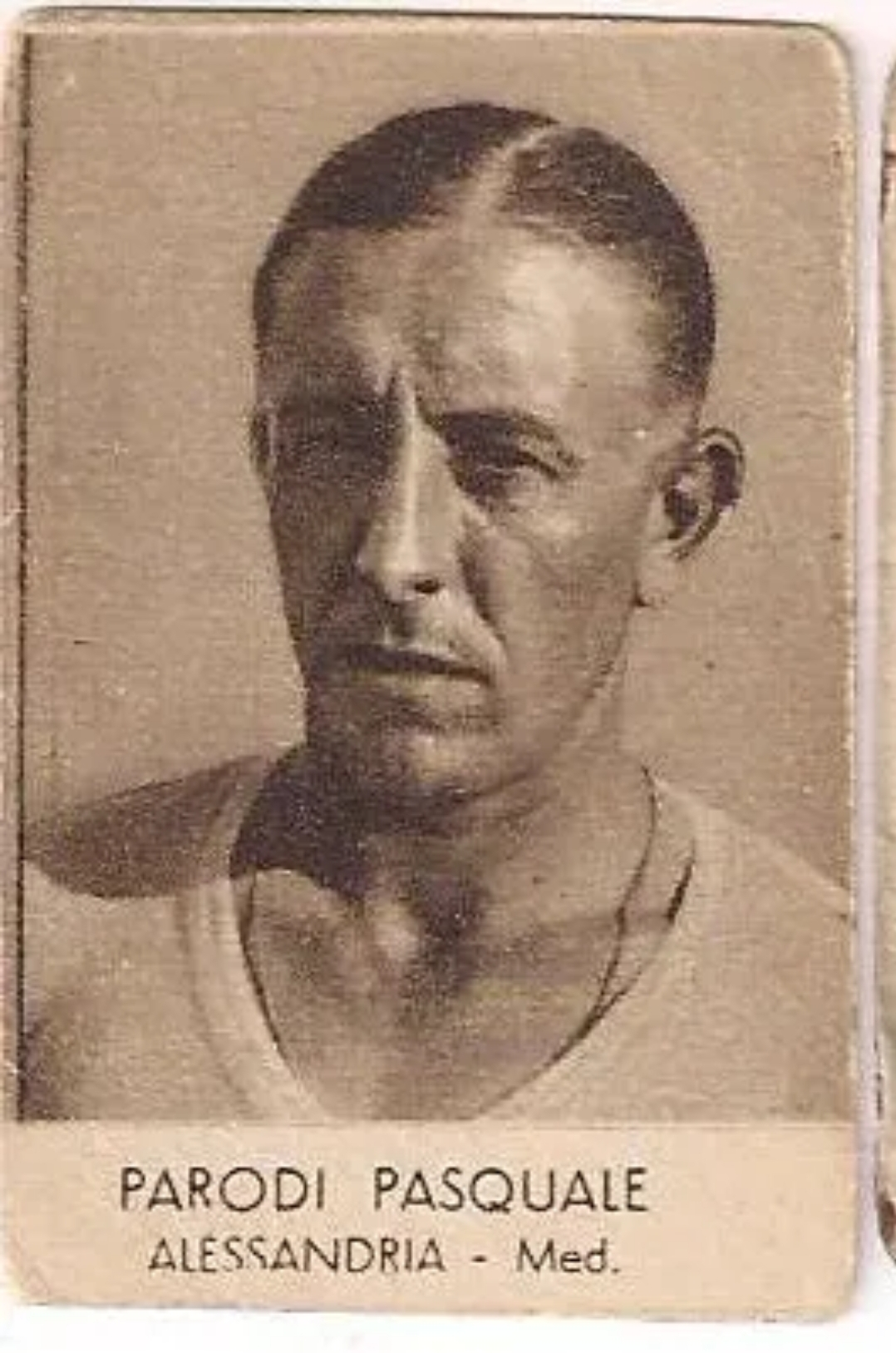
- Parodi in 1938

Personal information
- Date of birth: 11 April 1909
- Place of birth: Novi Ligure, Italy
- Height: 1.75 m (5 ft 9 in)
- Position: Midfielder

Senior career*
Years	Team	Apps	(Gls)
1927–1930	Derthona		
1930–1931	Ambrosiana-Inter	3	(0)
1931–1932	Bari	2	(0)
1932–1933	Savona	20	(3)
1933–1934	Novara	13	(0)
1934–1935	Derthona	25	(1)
1935–1942	Alessandria	177	(15)
1942–1943	Derthona		

Managerial career
- 1941–1942: Alessandria
- * Club domestic league appearances and goals

Pasquale Parodi (born 11 April 1909 in Novi Ligure) was an Italian professional football player and coach.
