= 1936 Mitropa Cup =

Tournament details
- Dates: 4 June – 13 September 1936
- Teams: 20

Final positions
- Champions: Austria Wien (2nd title)
- Runners-up: (Czechoslovakia) Sparta Prague

Tournament statistics
- Matches played: 38
- Top scorer: (Italy) Giuseppe Meazza (10 goals)

The 1936 season of the Mitropa Cup football club tournament was won by Austria Vienna, who defeated the previous champions Sparta Prague 1–0 on aggregate in the final. It was Austria Vienna's second victory in the competition, having previously won the competition in 1933. The two legs of the final were played on 6 September and 13 September.

This was the tenth edition of the tournament, and the first edition in which Swiss clubs competed.

== Teams ==
Preliminary round
(Czech Republic) Židenice (4th)	(Hungary) Phöbus (4th)	(Italy) Torino (3rd)	Austria Wien (7th)
(Switzerland) Lausanne-Sport (1st)	(Switzerland) Young Fellows Zurich (2nd)	(Switzerland) Grasshoppers (3rd)	(Switzerland) Bern (4th)
First round
(Czech Republic) Sparta Prague (1st)^{TH}	(Czech Republic) Slavia Prague (2nd)	(Czech Republic) Prostejov (3rd)	(Hungary) MTK Hungaria (1st)
(Hungary) Ujpest (2nd)	(Hungary) Ferencvarosi TC (3rd)	(Italy) Bologna (1st)	(Italy) Roma (2nd)
(Italy) Inter (4th)	(Austria) Admira Wien (1st)	(Austria) First Vienna (2nd)	(Austria) Rapid Wien (3rd)

== Preliminary round ==
Team 1	Agg.	Team 2	1st leg	2nd leg
Židenice (Czechoslovakia)	6–2	(Switzerland) Lausanne-Sport	5–0	1–2
Young Fellows Zurich (Switzerland)	2–9	(Hungary) Phöbus	0–3	2–6
Bern (Switzerland)	2–11	(Italy) Torino	1–4	1–7
Austria Wien	4–2	(Switzerland) Grasshoppers	3–1	1–1

== First round ==
Team 1	Agg.	Team 2	1st leg	2nd leg
Hungária MTK (Hungary)	1–7	(Austria) First Vienna	0–2	1–5
Židenice (Czechoslovakia)	3–11	(Italy) Ambrosiana Inter	2–3	1–8
Sparta Prague (Czechoslovakia)	7–6	(Hungary) Phöbus	5–2	2–4
Rapid Wien (Austria)	4–6	(Italy) Roma	3–1	1–5
Admira Wien (Austria)	3–6	(Czechoslovakia) Prostějov	0–4	3–2
Torino (Italy)	2–5	(Hungary) Újpest	2–0	0–5
AGC Bologna (Italy)	2–5	Austria Wien	2–1	0–4
Ferencváros (Hungary)	5–6	(Czechoslovakia) Slavia Prague	5–2	0–4

== Quarterfinals ==
Team 1	Agg.	Team 2	1st leg	2nd leg
First Vienna (Austria)	3–4	(Italy) Ambrosiana Inter	2–0	1–4
Austria Wien	3–1	(Czechoslovakia) Slavia Prague	3–0	0–1
Sparta Prague (Czechoslovakia)	4–1	(Italy) Roma	3–0	1–1
Prostějov (Czechoslovakia)	0–3	(Hungary) Újpest	0–1	0–2

== Semifinals ==
Team 1	Agg.	Team 2	1st leg	2nd leg
Ambrosiana Inter (Italy)	5–8	(Czechoslovakia) Sparta Prague	3–5	2–3
Újpest (Hungary)	3–7	Austria Wien	1–2	2–5

== Finals ==
Team 1	Agg.	Team 2	1st leg	2nd leg
Austria Wien	1–0	(Czechoslovakia) Sparta Prague	0–0	1–0

6 September 1936

Austria Wien	0–0	(Czechoslovakia) Sparta Prague

Praterstadion, Vienna
Attendance: 41,600
Referee: Giuseppe Scarpi (Italy)

13 September 1936

Sparta Prague (Czechoslovakia)	0–1	Austria Wien
		Jerusalem 67'

Masaryk-Stadion, Prague
Attendance: 58,000
Referee: Rinaldo Barlassina (Italy)

1936 Mitropa Cup Champions

Austria Wien
2nd Title

== Top goalscorers ==
Rank	Player	Team	Goals
1	(Italy) Giuseppe Meazza	(Italy) Ambrosiana Inter	10
2	(Austria) Camillo Jerusalem	Austria Wien	7
3	(Czechoslovakia) Oldřich Nejedlý	(Czechoslovakia) Sparta Prague	6
