= Ernesto Tomasi =

Italian footballer (1906-1997)

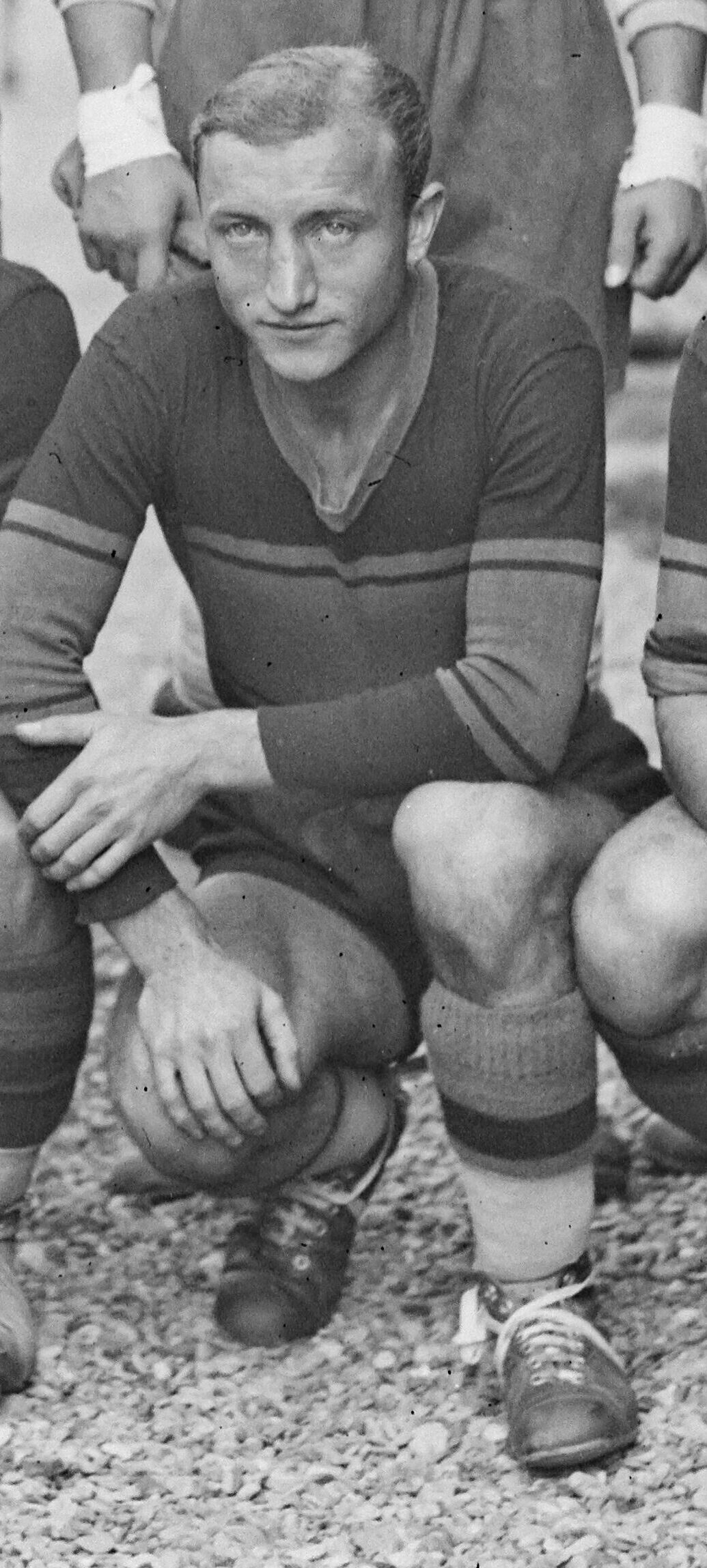

Personal information
- Date of birth: October 30, 1906
- Place of birth: Ventimiglia, Italy
- Date of death: April 6, 1997
- Height: 1.73 m (5 ft 8 in)
- Position: Midfielder

Senior career*
Years	Team	Apps	(Gls)
1925–1927	Ventimigliese		
1927–1930	Savona	65	(29)
1930–1933	Nice		
1933–1937	Roma	106	(16)
1937–1940	Juventus	71	(11)
1940–1943	Savona	70	(16)
1945	Sanremese		
1946	Voghera		
1946–1947	AS Cannes	6	(2)
- * Club domestic league appearances and goals

Ernesto Tomasi (October 30, 1906, in Ventimiglia – April 6, 1997) was an Italian professional football player.

He played for Ventimigliese, Roma and Juventus.
