= Ugo Ceresa =

Italian footballer

Personal information
- Date of birth: 5 February 1915
- Place of birth: Casale Monferrato, Kingdom of Italy
- Height: 1.75 m (5 ft 9 in)
- Position: Goalkeeper

Senior career*
Years	Team	Apps	(Gls)
1933–1934	Casale (B team)		
1934–1935	Casale	29	(0)
1935–1938	Alessandria	89	(0)
1938–1941	Roma	14	(0)
1941–1943	SPAL	7	(0)
1945–1946	SPAL	19	(0)
- * Club domestic league appearances and goals

Ugo Ceresa (born 5 February 1915) was an Italian professional football player. He was born in Casale Monferrato.

Ceresa played for 5 seasons (71 games) in the Serie A for U.S. Alessandria Calcio 1912 and A.S. Roma.
