= Andrea Bussaglia =

Italian football player (born 1997)

Personal information
- Date of birth: 28 May 1997 (age 29)
- Place of birth: Fano, Italy
- Height: 1.72 m (5 ft 8 in)
- Position: Midfielder

Team information
- Current team: Vado
- Number: 8

Youth career
- –2014: Rimini

Senior career*
Years	Team	Apps	(Gls)
2014–2016	Rimini	2	(0)
2014–2015	→ Fano (loan)	7	(1)
2015–2016	→ Forlì (loan)	14	(2)
2016–2017	Romagna Centro	29	(3)
2017–2018	Santarcangelo	35	(5)
2018–2020	Cittadella	17	(0)
2020–2021	Livorno	22	(4)
2021–2023	Monopoli	60	(0)
2023–2024	Pro Sesto	30	(2)
2024–	Vado	24	(3)
- * Club domestic league appearances and goals as of 28 Juny 2026

Andrea Bussaglia (born 28 May 1997) is an Italian footballer who plays as a midfielder for Serie C Group B club Vado.

== Club career ==
He spent the first three seasons of his senior career in the fourth-tier Serie D.

On 14 July 2017, he signed with Serie C club Santarcangelo. He made his Serie C debut for Santarangelo on 27 August 2017 in a game against Pordenone.

For the next 2018–19 season, he moved up to the second tier, signing with Serie B club Cittadella on 5 July 2018.

On 3 November 2020, he joined Livorno.

On 20 July 2021, he went to Monopoli.

On 25 August 2023, Bussaglia transferred to Pro Sesto.
