= Bruno Neri =

Italian footballer (1910–1944)

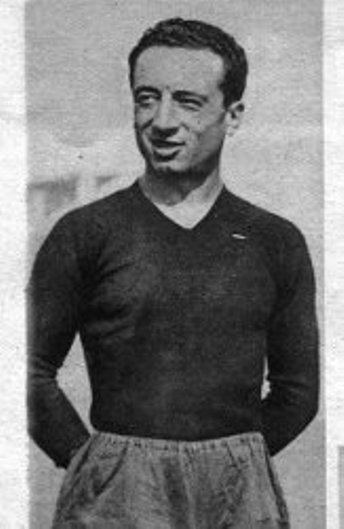

Personal information
- Date of birth: 12 October 1910
- Date of death: 10 July 1944 (aged 33)
- Position: Fullback

Senior career*
Years	Team	Apps	(Gls)
1926–1929	Faenza		
1929–1936	Fiorentina	187	(1)
1936–1937	Lucchese	25	(0)
1937–1940	Torino	65	(1)
1940–1944	Faenza		
Total		277	(2)

International career
1936–1937	Italy	3	(0)
- * Club domestic league appearances and goals

Bruno Neri (Italian pronunciation: [ˈbruːno ˈneːri]; 12 October 1910 – 10 July 1944) was an Italian footballer who played as a fullback. A World War II partisan, Neri was killed in action against German soldiers in Italy.

== Football career ==
Neri started his football career at age 16 with his hometown team Faenza, playing there for three years before joining Fiorentina in 1929, where he made 187 appearances. Neri went on to play for Lucchese in 1936-1937, coached by Ernest Erbstein, who was eventually deported under the race laws established by Benito Mussolini (Erbstein died in the Superga air disaster in 1949). Neri then spent three years with Torino, making 65 appearances there before returning to Faenza in 1940. Known as a serious and tenacious player, Neri also earned three caps with Italy between 1936 and 1937.

== Antifascist and partisan ==
Neri was an anti-fascist, and in 1931, at the inaugural match at a new stadium named in honour of Italian fascist Giovanni Berta, Neri was the sole player to refuse to give a fascist salute before the game, instead keeping both arms straight down by his sides.

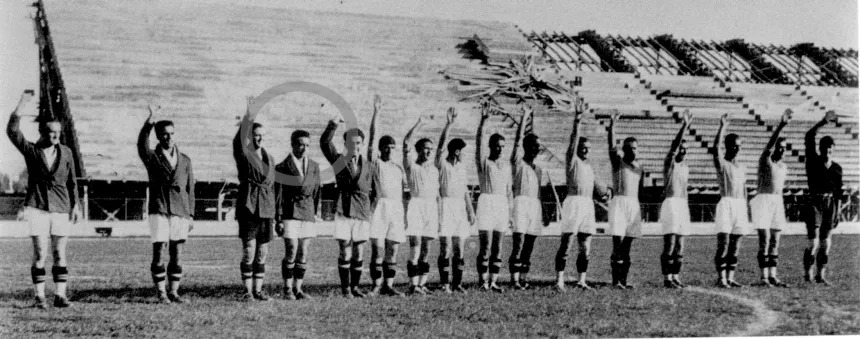
Neri forgoing the Roman salute

In 1940, Neri began combining his playing career with anti-fascist activities. By 1943, under the nom-de-guerre of Berni, he became a vice-commander of a resistance unit known as Battaglione Ravenna, while still playing football with Faenza. On July 10, 1944, while on a scouting mission in the Apennine Mountains, Neri and a fellow partisan were ambushed by German soldiers. They were both killed. A plaque still exists at the site where Neri died, “subjected to the brutal hatred of Nazi fury.”

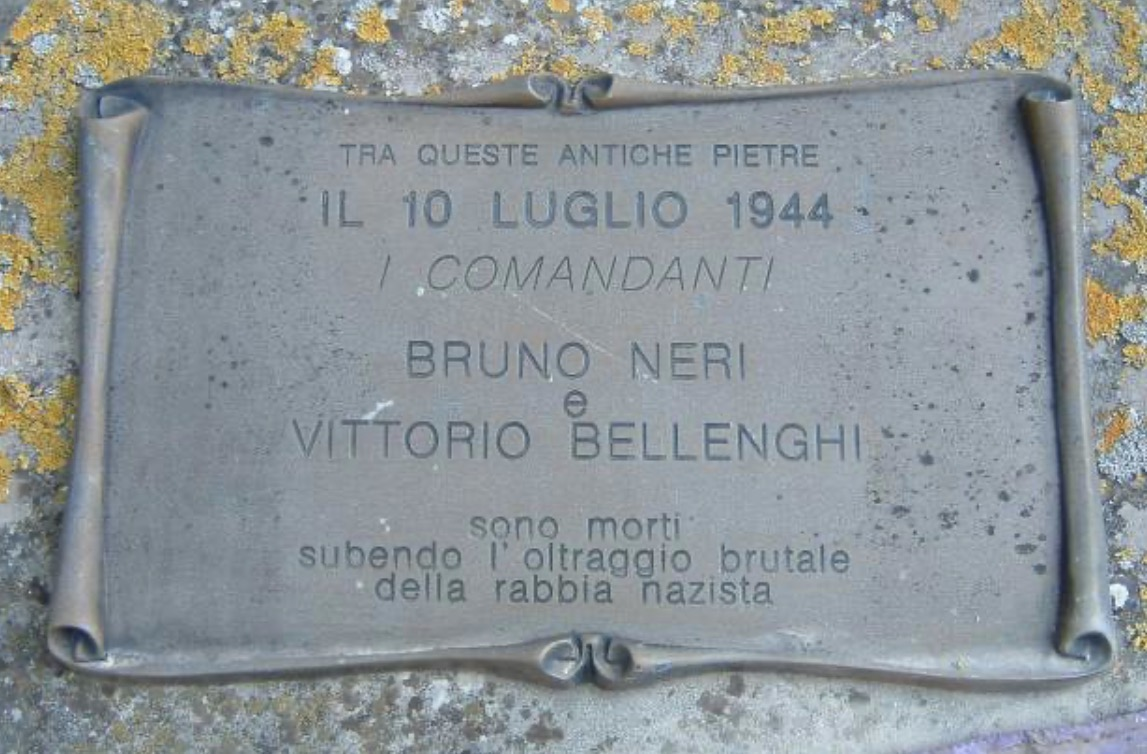
Memorial plaque at site of Bruno Neri’s death
