= Marcos Buscaglia =

Argentine economist

- Occupation(s): Economist, author

Marcos Buscaglia is an Argentine economist, author and expert on emerging markets, economics and finance. He formerly headed the Bank of America Merrill Lynch Latin America division, and is the author of Beyond the ESG Portfolio. How Wall Street Can Help Democracies Survive.

Buscaglia has served as chief economist Citibank Latin America, and has held professorships at several universities. After his arrival at Bank of America and his restructuring of operations, the division was positioned first in the 2015 Institutional Investor rankings. Buscaglia is responsible for macroeconomic predictions across Latin America. He has authored several articles published in Financial Times, La Nación, Clarín, El Mercurio, and Valor Económico, as well as many others.
