= FC Vado =

Italian football club

Vado
- Full name: Football Club Vado
- Founded: 1913; 1945 (reactivated)
- Ground: Stadio Ferruccio Chittolina, Vado Ligure, Italy
- Capacity: 2,000
- Chairman: Franco Tarabotto
- Manager: Matteo Pastorino
- League: Serie C Group B
- 2025–26: Serie D Group A, 1st of 18 (promoted)
Home colours	Away colours

Vado Football Club 1913, better known as Vado, is a football club based in Vado Ligure, Liguria, Italy.

They are known for being the first team to win the Coppa Italia in 1922, after beating Udinese in the final 1–0. They will play in Serie C after winning the 2025–26 Serie D.

== Current squad ==
As of 30 August 2026.

Note: Flags indicate national team as defined under FIFA eligibility rules; some limited exceptions apply. Players may hold more than one non-FIFA nationality.

No.	Pos.	Nation	Player
1	GK	ITA	Simone Calvani (on loan from Genoa)
2	DF	ITA	Luca Dellepiane
5	DF	ITA	Mirko Saltarelli
7	MF	ITA	Diego Tampieri
8	MF	ITA	Andrea Bussaglia
9	FW	ITA	Lorenzo Lischetti
10	MF	ITA	Jacopo Simonetta (on loan from Como)
11	FW	ITA	Diego Vita
14	DF	ITA	Federico Gulinelli
16	GK	ITA	Andrea Sala
17	MF	ITA	Mirko Lazzarini
18	DF	ITA	Luca Piana
20	MF	ITA	Matteo De Rinaldis
21	MF	ITA	Alessandro Di Munno
22	GK	ITA	Andrea Bellocci
23	DF	ITA	Lorenzo Costantino
25	MF	ITA	Maiko Candiano

No.	Pos.	Nation	Player
28	MF	ITA	Zaccaria Hamlili
29	DF	ITA	Filippo Saiani (on loan from Virtus Entella)
30	MF	ITA	Leonardo Tiana
31	FW	ITA	Matteo Ferro
32	MF	ITA	Andrea Ghezzi (on loan from Cittadella)
39	DF	ITA	Lorenzo Malanca (on loan from Sampdoria)
78	MF	ITA	Enrico Saracco
80	MF	ITA	Kevin Bruno (on loan from Sassuolo)
81	DF	ITA	Nicolò Agostino
95	FW	ITA	Iacopo Cernigoi
97	MF	ITA	Filippo Rosa (on loan from Vicenza)
99	MF	ITA	Giorgio Lionetti
—	DF	ITA	Michele Messina
—	DF	ITA	Michael Ndianefo
—	MF	ITA	Matteo Alluci
—	MF	ITA	Michele Lupinacci
—	FW	ITA	Leroy Cecchinato

== Honours ==
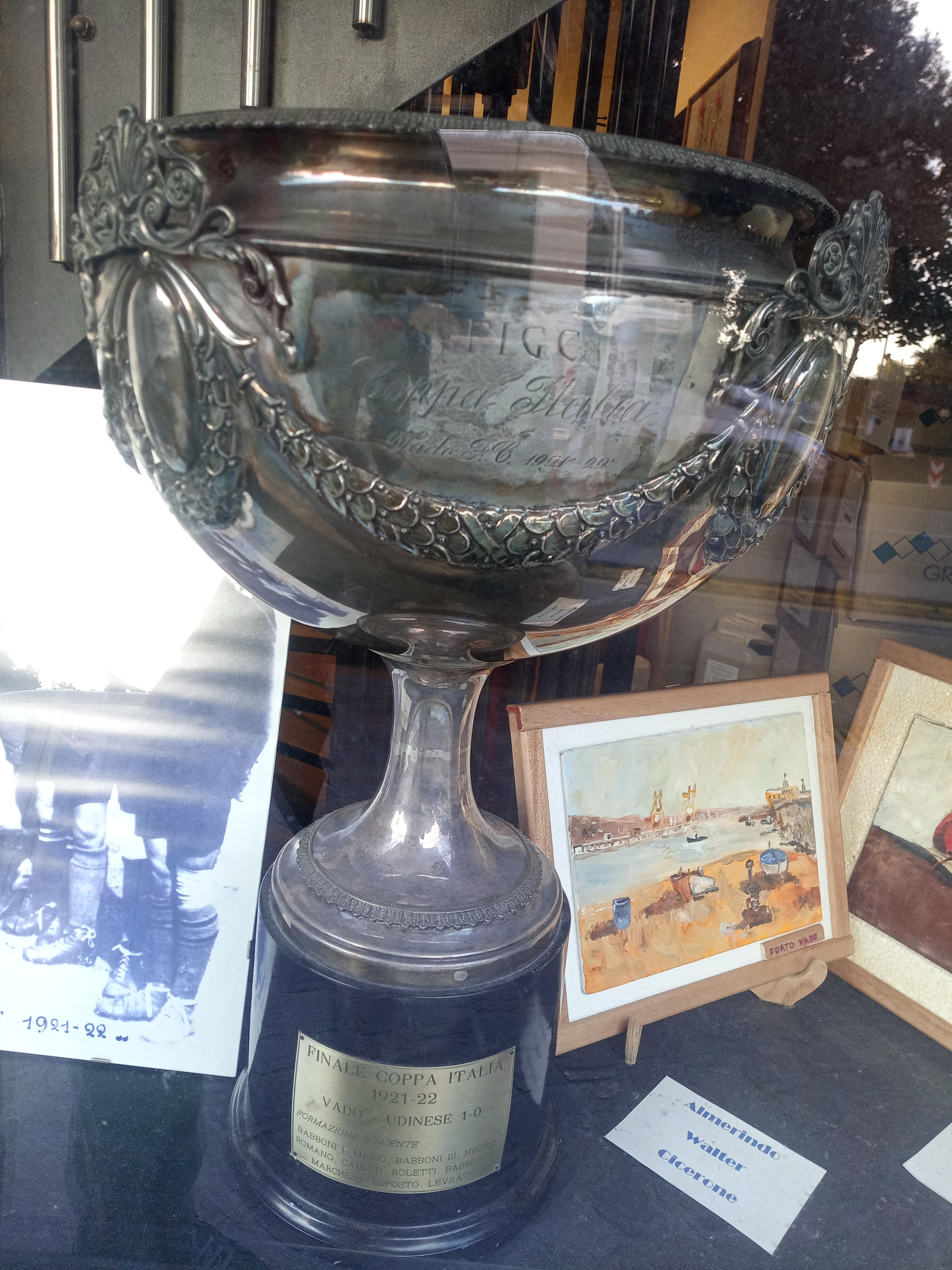
Vado's Coppa Italia trophy’s copy. The original one was destroyed by the fascists

- Coppa Italia
  - Winners: 1922
- Eccellenza Liguria
  - Winners: 2000–01, 2012–13, 2018–19
- Promozione
  - Winners: 1995–96 (group A)
