= Ernesto Bonino (footballer) =

Italian footballer (1899-1984)

Personal information
- Date of birth: 12 July 1899
- Place of birth: La Spezia, Italy
- Date of death: 2 June 1984 (aged 84)
- Position: Striker

Senior career*
Years	Team	Apps	(Gls)
1920–1927	Lucchese	56+	(9)

International career
1921–1922	Italy	2	(0)
- * Club domestic league appearances and goals

Ernesto Bonino (Italian pronunciation: [erˈnɛsto boˈniːno]; 12 July 1899 – 2 June 1984) was an Italian professional footballer who played as a striker.

== Club career ==
Bonino played for 7 seasons for A.S. Lucchese Libertas 1905.

== International career ==
Bonino made his debut for the Italy national football team on 6 November 1921 in a game against Switzerland.
