= Pietro Buscaglia =

Italian footballer (1911–1997)

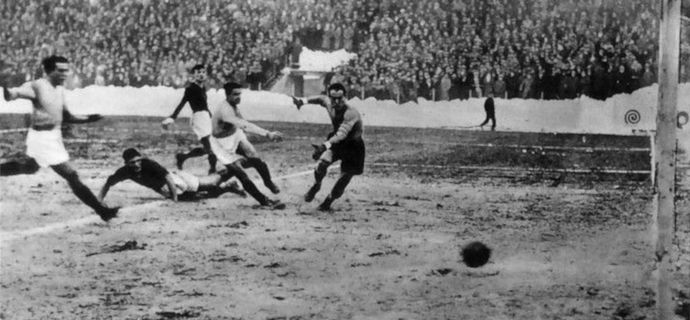
- 1935–36 Serie A - FBC Torino v Bologna AGC

Personal information
- Date of birth: 9 February 1911
- Place of birth: Turin, Kingdom of Italy
- Date of death: 12 July 1997 (aged 86)
- Place of death: Vigevano, Italy
- Height: 1.68 m (5 ft 6 in)
- Position: Midfielder

Senior career*
Years	Team	Apps	(Gls)
1929–1932	Vigevanesi		
1932–1934	Lazio	34	(5)
1934–1938	Torino	80	(35)
1938–1941	Milano	40	(10)
1941–1942	Savona	27	(10)
1942–1943	Abbiategrasso		
1944–1947	Vigevano		

International career
1937	Italy	1	(0)
- * Club domestic league appearances and goals

Pietro Buscaglia (Italian pronunciation: [ˈpjɛːtro buˈskaʎʎa]; 9 February 1911 – 12 July 1997) was an Italian professional footballer who played as a midfielder.

== Club career ==
Buscaglia played for 9 seasons (153 games, 50 goals) in the Serie A for clubs S.S. Lazio, A.C. Torino and A.C. Milan.

He was among the top 10 goalscorers of Serie A on two occasions: 1935–36 and 1936–37 (second best scorer with 17 goals behind Silvio Piola with 21).

== International career ==
Buscaglia played his only game for the Italy national football team on 25 April 1937 in a game against Hungary.
