= Coppa Italia =

Annual association football tournament in Italy

- Organiser(s): Lega Serie A
- Founded: 1922; 104 years ago
- Region: Italy
- Teams: 44
- Qualifier for: UEFA Europa League
- Domestic cup: Supercoppa Italiana
- Current champions: Inter Milan (10th title)
- Most championships: Juventus (15 titles)
- Broadcasters: Mediaset; List of international broadcasters
- Website: legaseriea.it/coppa
- 2026–27 Coppa Italia

Coppa Italia (lit. 'Italy Cup') is the annual domestic cup of Italian football. The knockout competition was organized by the DDS and the Lega Calcio until the 2009–10 season and by Lega Serie A ever since.

Juventus is the competition's most successful club with fifteen wins, followed by Inter Milan with ten. Juventus has contested the most finals with 22, followed by Roma with 17 finals. The holder can wear a cockade of Italy (Italian: coccarda), akin to the roundels that appear on military aircraft. The winner automatically qualifies for both the UEFA Europa League league phase and the Supercoppa Italiana the following year.

== History ==
The beginning of the tournament was turbulent, due to the complexity of the participation of the teams in the tournament, since its inception in 1921, the Italian championship was divided into two groups. On the one hand the rich CCI Championship (Italian Football Confederation) and on the other the poor FIGC championship (Italian Football Federation). Losing all its most prestigious clubs, the FIGC tried to enhance its rump season with a new cup. The tournament's first edition held in 1922 was won by F.C. Vado. The following agreement between the contenders did not contemplate a cup that, outside a failed 1926–27 tournament which was cancelled during the round of 32, was not held until 1935–36. The events of World War II interrupted the tournament after the 1942–43 season, and it did not resume again until 1958. Since then, it has been played annually or seasonally.

The eight seasons during the fascist period were contested copying the FA Cup format. There was a different trophy, and the winners were awarded the tricolour scudetto while the championship winners obtained a Savoyard scudetto instead.

The present-day cup and cockade were introduced in 1958. The cup was resumed following the voices of the creation of a Cup Winners Cup. Having the sole goal to define a participant to the new UEFA competition, the cup had a minimal direct elimination format.

In 1967, following the reduction of the Serie A to 16 teams, semifinals and finals were replaced by a final post-season group, while the following year a pre-season group substituted the early rounds. In 1971, the format was restructured with two semifinal post-season groups, in order to introduce a fixed one-legged final in Rome.

Ordinary quarterfinals and semi-finals were reintroduced in 1978, with a round of 16 when the competition was reopened to some Serie C clubs. Direct elimination then replaced any group when the Serie A was expanded to 18 club in the late eighties. After the expansion of the league to 20 clubs in the 2000s, the actual minimalist format was fixed.

== Format ==
The Coccarda, the winner's patch

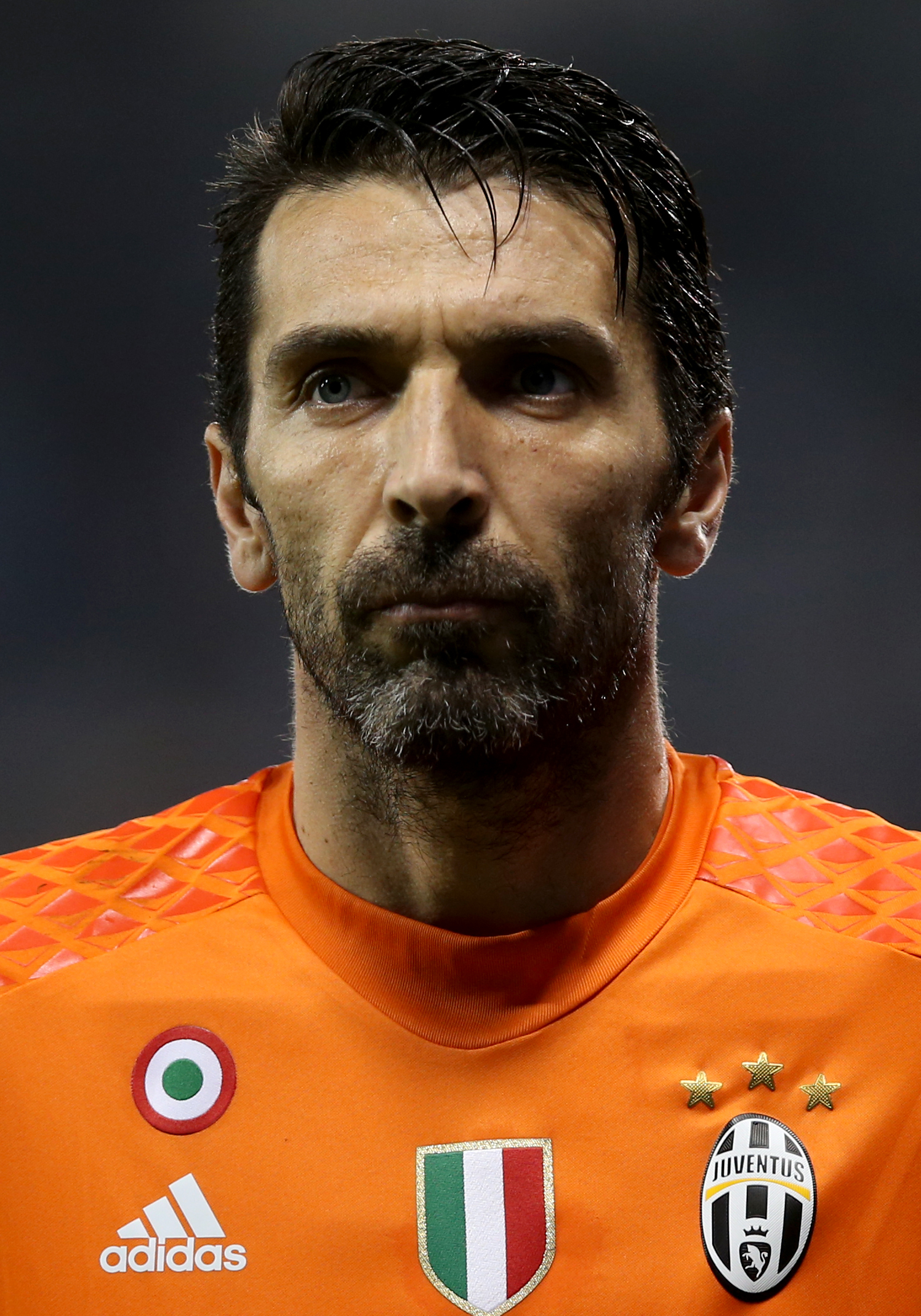
Gianluigi Buffon in 2016, wearing the Coccarda won with Juventus the season before. Also present is the Scudetto, worn by the holders of the Serie A title.

The competition is a knockout tournament with pairings for each round made in advance; the draw for the whole competition is made before a ball is kicked. Each tie is played as a single leg, except a two-legged semi-final stage. Through the 2023–24 edition, extra time was played following all matches drawn after 90 minutes. Beginning with the 2024–25 edition, extra time is only possible in the semi-finals and the final; matches drawn after 90 minutes in all other rounds are immediately followed by a penalty shoot-out to determine which team will advance to the next round.

In addition to being presented with the trophy, the winning team also qualifies for the UEFA Europa League. If the winners have already qualified for the UEFA Champions League via the Serie A or are not entitled to play in UEFA competitions for any reason, the place goes to the next highest placed team in the league table.

There are a total of seven rounds in the competition. It begins in August with the preliminary round and is contested only by the eight lowest-ranked clubs. Clubs playing in Serie B join in during the first round with the 12 lowest-ranked teams in Serie A based on the previous league season's positions (unless they are to compete in European competition that year) begin the competition in the first round before August is over. The remaining eight Serie A teams join the competition in the third round in winter, at which point 16 teams remain. The quarterfinals are then played in quick succession, and the semi-finals are played in April, before the final in May. The two-legged final was eliminated for the 2007–08 edition and a single-match final is now played at the Stadio Olimpico in Rome.

Phase	Round	Clubs remaining	Clubs involved	From previous round	Entries in this round	Teams entering at this round
First phase	Preliminary round	44	8	none	8	Four teams from Serie B and four teams from Serie C (ranked 37–44)
First phase	First round	40	32	4	28	12 teams from Serie A and 16 teams from Serie B (ranked 9–36)
First phase	Second round	24	16	16	none	
Second phase	Round of 16	16	16	8	8	Eight teams from Serie A (ranked 1–8)
Second phase	Quarter-finals	8	8	4	none	
Second phase	Semi-finals	4	4	2	none	
Second phase	Final	2	2	1	none	

== Winners by year ==
List of winners of Coppa Italia

- 1922: Vado (1)
- 1935–36: Torino (1)
- 1936–37: Genoa (1)
- 1937–38: Juventus (1)
- 1938–39: Inter Milan (1)
- 1939–40: Fiorentina (1)
- 1940–41: Venezia (1)
- 1941–42: Juventus (2)
- 1942–43: Torino (2)
- 1958: Lazio (1)
- 1958–59: Juventus (3)
- 1959–60: Juventus (4)
- 1960–61: Fiorentina (2)
- 1961–62: Napoli (1)
- 1962–63: Atalanta (1)
- 1963–64: Roma (1)
- 1964–65: Juventus (5)
- 1965–66: Fiorentina (3)
- 1966–67: AC Milan (1)
- 1967–68: Torino (3)
- 1968–69: Roma (2)
- 1969–70: Bologna (1)
- 1970–71: Torino (4)
- 1971–72: AC Milan (2)
- 1972–73: AC Milan (3)
- 1973–74: Bologna (2)
- 1974–75: Fiorentina (4)
- 1975–76: Napoli (2)
- 1976–77: AC Milan (4)
- 1977–78: Inter Milan (2)
- 1978–79: Juventus (6)
- 1979–80: Roma (3)
- 1980–81: Roma (4)
- 1981–82: Inter Milan (3)
- 1982–83: Juventus (7)
- 1983–84: Roma (5)
- 1984–85: Sampdoria (1)
- 1985–86: Roma (6)
- 1986–87: Napoli (3)
- 1987–88: Sampdoria (2)
- 1988–89: Sampdoria (3)
- 1989–90: Juventus (8)
- 1990–91: Roma (7)
- 1991–92: Parma (1)
- 1992–93: Torino (5)
- 1993–94: Sampdoria (4)
- 1994–95: Juventus (9)
- 1995–96: Fiorentina (5)
- 1996–97: Vicenza (1)
- 1997–98: Lazio (2)
- 1998–99: Parma (2)
- 1999–2000: Lazio (3)
- 2000–01: Fiorentina (6)
- 2001–02: Parma (3)
- 2002–03: AC Milan (5)
- 2003–04: Lazio (4)
- 2004–05: Inter Milan (4)
- 2005–06: Inter Milan (5)
- 2006–07: Roma (8)
- 2007–08: Roma (9)
- 2008–09: Lazio (5)
- 2009–10: Inter Milan (6)
- 2010–11: Inter Milan (7)
- 2011–12: Napoli (4)
- 2012–13: Lazio (6)
- 2013–14: Napoli (5)
- 2014–15: Juventus (10)
- 2015–16: Juventus (11)
- 2016–17: Juventus (12)
- 2017–18: Juventus (13)
- 2018–19: Lazio (7)
- 2019–20: Napoli (6)
- 2020–21: Juventus (14)
- 2021–22: Inter Milan (8)
- 2022–23: Inter Milan (9)
- 2023–24: Juventus (15)
- 2024–25: Bologna (3)
- 2025–26: Inter Milan (10)

== Performance by club ==
=== Trophies ===
Club	Winners	Winning years
Juventus	15	1938, 1942, 1959, 1960, 1965, 1979, 1983, 1990, 1995, 2015, 2016, 2017, 2018, 2021, 2024
Inter Milan	10	1939, 1978, 1982, 2005, 2006, 2010, 2011, 2022, 2023, 2026
Roma	9	1964, 1969, 1980, 1981, 1984, 1986, 1991, 2007, 2008
Lazio	7	1958, 1998, 2000, 2004, 2009, 2013, 2019
Fiorentina	6	1940, 1961, 1966, 1975, 1996, 2001
Napoli	6	1962, 1976, 1987, 2012, 2014, 2020
Torino	5	1936, 1943, 1968, 1971, 1993
AC Milan	5	1967, 1972, 1973, 1977, 2003
Sampdoria	4	1985, 1988, 1989, 1994
Bologna	3	1970, 1974, 2025
Parma	3	1992, 1999, 2002
Vado	1	1922
Genoa	1	1937
Venezia	1	1941
Atalanta	1	1963
Vicenza	1	1997
Total	78	—

Notes

- The 1922 tournament was contested only by smaller clubs who remained associated with FIGC, following the formation of a breakaway league by the larger teams who participated the 1921–22 Prima Divisione.
- Although 79 tournaments have been contested, only 78 titles have been assigned. The 1926–27 edition was abandoned in the round of 32.

=== Finals ===
Winning years are in bold.

Club	Finalists	Finals years
Juventus	22	**1938**, **1942**, **1959**, **1960**, **1965**, 1973, **1979**, **1983**, **1990**, 1992, **1995**, 2002, 2004, 2012, **2015**, **2016**, **2017**, **2018**, 2020, **2021**, 2022, **2024**
Roma	17	1937, 1941, **1964**, **1969**, **1980**, **1981**, **1984**, **1986**, **1991**, 1993, 2003, 2005, 2006, **2007**, **2008**, 2010, 2013
Inter Milan	16	**1939**, 1959, 1965, 1977, **1978**, **1982**, 2000, **2005**, **2006**, 2007, 2008, **2010**, **2011**, **2022**, **2023**, **2026**
AC Milan	15	1942, **1967**, 1968, 1971, **1972**, **1973**, 1975, **1977**, 1985, 1990, 1998, **2003**, 2016, 2018, 2025
Torino	13	**1936**, 1938, **1943**, 1963, 1964, **1968**, 1970, **1971**, 1980, 1981, 1982, 1988, **1993**
Fiorentina	11	**1940**, 1958, 1960, **1961**, **1966**, **1975**, **1996**, 1999, **2001**, 2014, 2023
Lazio	11	**1958**, 1961, **1998**, **2000**, **2004**, **2009**, **2013**, 2015, 2017, **2019**, 2026
Napoli	10	**1962**, 1972, **1976**, 1978, **1987**, 1989, 1997, **2012**, **2014**, **2020**
Sampdoria	7	**1985**, 1986, **1988**, **1989**, 1991, **1994**, 2009
Atalanta	6	**1963**, 1987, 1996, 2019, 2021, 2024
Parma	5	**1992**, 1995, **1999**, 2001, **2002**
Bologna	3	**1970**, **1974**, **2025**
Palermo	3	1974, 1979, 2011
Hellas Verona	3	1976, 1983, 1984
Genoa	2	**1937**, 1940
Venezia	2	**1941**, 1943
Vado	1	**1922**
Udinese	1	1922
Alessandria	1	1936
Novara	1	1939
SPAL	1	1962
Catanzaro	1	1966
Padova	1	1967
Cagliari	1	1969
Ancona	1	1994
Vicenza	1	**1997**
Total	156	—

Notes

- From 1968 to 1971, FIGC introduced a final group instead of semi-finals and finals. For statistical equity, only champions and runners-up of those groups are counted as finalists.

== Performance by player ==
=== Top appearances ===
Rank	Player	Period	Games
1	(Italy) Roberto Mancini	1981–2001	120
2	(Italy) Giuseppe Bergomi	1979–1999	119
3	(Italy) Pietro Vierchowod	1977–1991	116
4	(Italy) Franco Causio	1968–1989	113
5	(Italy) Dino Zoff	1962–1983	110
6	(Italy) Ivano Bordon	1972–1989	103
7	(Italy) Fausto Salsano	1979–2000	102
8	(Italy) Gaetano Scirea	1972–1988	101
8	(Italy) Luigi Danova	1971–1991	101
9	(Italy) Giuseppe Bruscolotti	1972–1988	100
10	(Italy) Pietro Fanna	1975–1993	98
10	(Italy) Giuseppe Savoldi	1965–1983	98
10	(Italy) Gabriele Oriali	1970–1987	98
10	(Italy) Domenico Caso	1972–1988	98
11	(Italy) Franco Baresi	1977–1997	97
12	(Italy) Giuseppe Baresi	1971–1994	96
13	(Italy) Alessandro Altobelli	1973–1990	95
14	(Italy) Fausto Pari	1984–1997	94
15	(Italy) Alberto Bigon	1966–1984	93
15	(Italy) Giuseppe Dossena	1978–1992	93
15	(Italy) Enrico Albertosi	1958–1980	93
18	(Italy) Paolo Pulici	1966–1985	92
18	(Italy) Gaetano Scirea	1971–1988	92
18	(Italy) Giuseppe Furino	1967–1984	92
18	(Italy) Giancarlo Corradini	1981–1993	92
18	(Italy) Romeo Benetti	1968–1981	92
23	(Italy) Gianluca Vialli	1980–1996	90

=== Top goalscorers ===
Rank	Player	Club(s)	Goals
1	(Italy) Alessandro Altobelli	Brescia, Inter Milan, Juventus	56
2	(Italy) Roberto Boninsegna	Hellas Verona, Varese, Juventus, Cagliari, Inter Milan	48
3	(Italy) Giuseppe Savoldi	Atalanta, Bologna, Napoli	47
4	(Italy) Gianluca Vialli	Cremonese, Sampdoria, Juventus	43
5	(Italy) Bruno Giordano	Lazio, Napoli, Ascoli, Bologna	38
5	(Italy) Paolo Pulici	Torino, Udinese, Fiorentina	38
7	(Italy) Roberto Baggio	Vicenza, Fiorentina, Juventus, AC Milan, Bologna, Inter Milan, Brescia	36
7	(Italy) Pietro Anastasi	Varese, Juventus, Inter Milan, Ascoli	36
9	(Italy) Roberto Mancini	Bologna, Sampdoria, Lazio	33
10	(Italy) Gigi Riva	Cagliari	32
11	(Italy) Roberto Pruzzo	Genoa, Roma, Fiorentina	30
12	(Argentina) Diego Maradona	Napoli	29
13	(Italy) Andrea Carnevale	Avellino, Reggiana, Cagliari, Udinese, Napoli, Roma, Pescara	28
13	(Italy) Gianni Rivera	AC Milan	28
15	(Italy) Francesco Graziani	Arezzo, Torino, Fiorentina, Roma, Udinese	27
16	(Italy) Pierino Prati	AC Milan, Roma	26
16	(Italy) Oscar Damiani	Vicenza, Napoli, Juventus, Genoa, AC Milan, Parma	26
16	(Italy) Aldo Serena	Bari, Inter Milan, AC Milan, Juventus	26
19	(Italy) Alessandro Del Piero	Juventus	25
19	(Italy) Antonio Di Natale	Empoli, Udinese	25
19	(Italy) Sandro Tovalieri	Arezzo, Roma, Avellino, Ancona, Atalanta, Reggiana, Sampdoria	25
19	(Argentina) Gabriel Batistuta	Fiorentina, Roma	25

=== Most titles ===
Gianluigi Buffon and Roberto Mancini (6)

== Broadcasting ==
This is a list of television broadcasters and streaming television providers which provide coverage of the Coppa Italia, as well as the Supercoppa Italiana and maybe exclude the Serie A matches (depending on broadcasting rights in selected regions).

=== 2024–2027 ===
==== Italy ====
The Coppa Italia and the Supercoppa Italiana has been broadcast by Mediaset since the 2021–22 season. Previously, the tournament was aired by the national public broadcaster RAI up until the 2020–21 edition.

==== International ====
For countries without broadcasting rights, both Coppa Italia and Supercoppa Italiana also available via Serie A YouTube channel.

Countries	Broadcaster	Ref
Albania	Tring	
Andorra	DAZN	
Austria	DAZN	
Belgium	DAZN	
France	DAZN	
Germany	DAZN	
Japan	DAZN	
Liechtenstein	DAZN	
Spain	DAZN	
Switzerland	DAZN	
Australia	Network 10	
Brazil	CazéTV	
Brazil	Nsports	
Brazil	SportyNet	
Bosnia and Herzegovina	Arena Sport	
Croatia	Arena Sport	
Montenegro	Arena Sport	
North Macedonia	Arena Sport	
Serbia	Arena Sport	
Slovenia	Arena Sport	
Bulgaria	Max Sport	
Canada	TLN	
Canada	fuboTV	
China	Migu	
Central America	Fox	
Dominican Republic	Fox	
Mexico	Fox	
Colombia	Win Sports	
Cyprus	Cytavision Sports	
Czech Republic	Sport1	
Slovakia	Sport1	
Ecuador	ECDF	
Greece	Nova Sports	
Hungary	Arena4	
India	Unite8 Sports	
Indonesia	ANTV	
Indonesia	Emtek	
Iran	IRIB	
Iran	Persiana Sports	
Ireland	Premier Sports	
United Kingdom	Premier Sports	
Israel	Charlton	
Kazakhstan	QAZTRK	
Kazakhstan	Sport+	
Middle East and North Africa	MBC Group	
Malta	TSN	
Netherlands	Ziggo Sport	
Norway	VG+	
Pakistan	Begin	
Poland	Polsat Sport	
Portugal	Sport TV	
Romania	Voyo	
Russia	Match TV	
South America	DSports	
South Korea	SPOTV	
Sub-Saharan Africa	Azam TV	
Sub-Saharan Africa	New World TV	
Sweden	Aftonbladet	
Thailand	True Sports	
Turkey	TRT	
Ukraine	MEGOGO	
United States	CBS (English)	
United States	Telemundo (Spanish)	

== See also ==
- Supercoppa Italiana
- Coppa Italia Dilettanti
- List of Coppa Italia finals
