= 1935–36 Serie A =

35th season of top-tier Italian football

Serie A
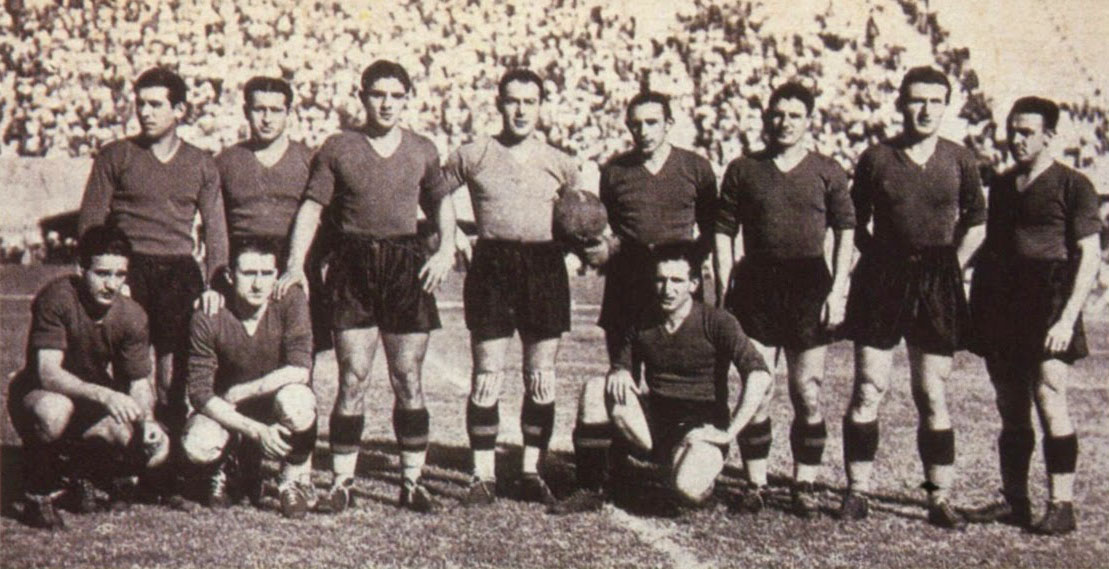
- The 1935–36 Serie A winning Bologna squad
- Season: 1935–36
- Champions: Bologna; 3rd title
- Relegated: Palermo; Brescia
- Matches: 240
- Goals: 610 (2.54 per match)
- Top goalscorer: Giuseppe Meazza (25 goals)

The 1935-36 Serie A was the thirty-sixth edition of the Italian Football Championship and its seventh since 1929 re-branding to create Serie A. It was the thirteenth season from which the Italian Football Champions adorned their team jerseys in the subsequent season with a Scudetto. Bologna were champions for the third time in their history. This was their third scudetto since the scudetto started being awarded in 1924 and their first win contested as Serie A. This started a run of four Bologna wins from six consecutive Serie A competitions.

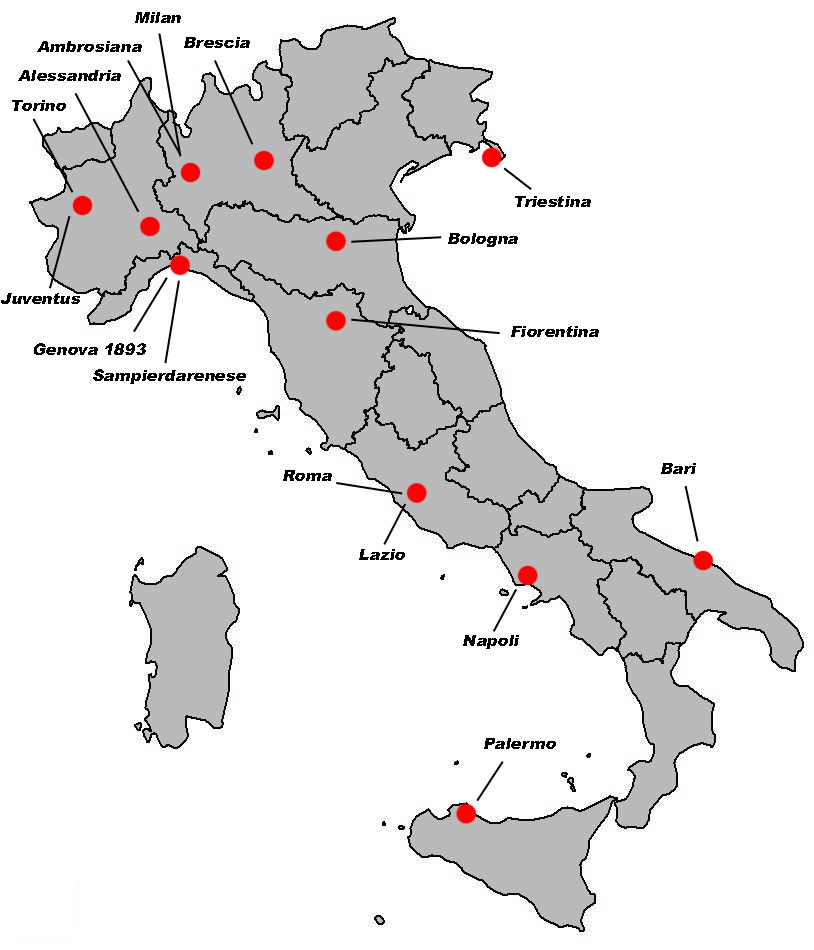
Serie A 1935-36 teams distribution

== Teams ==
Genova 1893 and Bari had been promoted from Serie B.

== Final classification ==
Pos	Team	Pld	W	D	L	GF	GA	GD	Pts	Qualification or relegation
1	Bologna (C)	30	15	10	5	39	21	+18	40	1936 Mitropa Cup
2	Roma	30	16	7	7	32	20	+12	39	1936 Mitropa Cup
3	Torino	30	16	6	8	49	33	+16	38	1936 Mitropa Cup
4	Ambrosiana-Inter	30	14	8	8	61	34	+27	36	1936 Mitropa Cup
5	Juventus	30	13	9	8	46	33	+13	35	
6	Triestina	30	10	12	8	46	39	+7	32	
7	Lazio	30	11	8	11	48	42	+6	30	
8	Milan	30	10	8	12	40	41	−1	28	
8	Napoli	30	11	6	13	42	45	−3	28	
8	Alessandria	30	9	10	11	34	37	−3	28	
8	Genova 1893	30	7	14	9	38	44	−6	28	
12	Fiorentina	30	10	7	13	32	42	−10	27	
12	Sampierdarenese	30	9	9	12	32	49	−17	27	
14	Bari	30	7	11	12	26	38	−12	25	
15	Palermo (R)	30	10	3	17	24	50	−26	23	Relegation to Serie B
16	Brescia (R)	30	5	6	19	21	42	−21	16	Relegation to Serie B

Source: Panini
(C) Champions; (R) Relegated

== Results ==
Home \ Away	ALE	AMB	BAR	BOL	BRE	FIO	GEN	JUV	LAZ	MIL	NAP	PAL	ROM	SAM	TOR	TRI
Alessandria		2–2	2–0	1–1	5–0	2–1	1–0	3–2	2–0	6–1	2–3	1–0	1–0	1–1	0–2	0–0
Ambrosiana-Inter	2–1		2–0	3–1	1–0	0–2	3–0	4–0	3–1	1–1	4–2	4–0	5–1	3–0	4–0	5–0
Bari	4–0	2–1		0–0	1–1	0–0	3–2	1–1	1–1	0–2	0–0	1–0	0–1	1–1	2–0	0–0
Bologna	1–1	3–0	0–2		1–0	1–0	4–1	2–1	2–0	4–1	2–1	1–0	2–0	0–0	2–0	3–0
Brescia	1–1	1–0	1–2	2–1		2–0	0–0	0–1	3–1	1–2	2–0	0–1	1–1	1–2	2–2	0–0
Fiorentina	0–0	2–3	2–2	0–1	1–0		2–1	1–1	2–1	3–1	2–0	2–1	1–2	1–1	0–2	3–1
Genova 1893	0–0	2–2	0–0	1–1	2–0	2–2		1–1	3–2	3–3	2–2	2–0	2–1	3–0	0–2	2–2
Juventus	4–0	1–0	0–0	0–0	1–0	0–0	4–0		2–1	3–1	2–2	3–1	1–3	7–2	2–1	3–0
Lazio	3–0	0–0	2–1	1–1	3–0	1–0	1–1	3–0		2–2	3–1	3–0	0–1	5–0	1–1	3–2
Milan	2–0	2–2	4–0	1–2	2–1	1–0	1–0	2–1	5–0		0–1	3–1	0–0	1–2	0–1	0–0
Napoli	1–0	3–2	2–0	0–1	1–0	4–0	2–1	0–1	1–2	1–0		3–0	1–2	4–2	0–1	2–2
Palermo	1–0	1–1	2–1	2–0	3–2	1–3	0–1	1–0	2–1	0–0	2–2		1–3	2–0	0–1	1–0
Roma	3–1	0–0	3–0	1–0	1–0	0–1	0–0	1–1	1–0	0–0	1–0	0–1		2–0	1–0	1–0
Sampierdarenese	1–1	1–0	2–1	0–0	2–0	1–0	1–2	0–1	2–2	3–1	2–2	2–0	0–2		2–0	2–2
Torino	1–0	3–3	2–0	0–0	2–0	5–0	4–4	2–2	0–2	2–1	1–0	5–0	1–0	3–0		5–3
Triestina	0–0	2–1	4–1	2–2	2–0	5–1	0–0	1–0	3–3	1–0	6–1	5–0	0–0	1–0	2–0	

Source: Almanacco Illustrato del Calcio - La Storia 1898-2004, Panini Edizioni, Modena, September 2005 (in Italian)
Legend: Blue = home team win; Yellow = draw; Red = away team win.

== Top goalscorers ==
Rank	Player	Club	Goals
1	(Italy) Giuseppe Meazza	Ambrosiana-Inter	25
2	(Italy) Guglielmo Gabetto	Juventus	20
3	(Italy) Silvio Piola	Lazio	19
4	(Argentina) Alfredo Devincenzi	Ambrosiana-Inter	12
4	(Italy) Giovanni Busoni	Napoli	12
6	(Italy) Pietro Arcari	Milan	11
6	(Italy) Nereo Rocco	Triestina	11
8	(Italy) Germano Mian	Triestina	10
8	(Italy) Angelo Schiavio	Bologna	10
8	(Italy) Onesto Silano	Torino	10

== References and sources ==
- Almanacco Illustrato del Calcio - La Storia 1898-2004, Panini Edizioni, Modena, September 2005
