= List of AS Roma chairmen =

The following is a list of chairmen of Associazione Sportiva Roma.

== Presidential history ==
Roma have had numerous chairmen over the course of their history, some of which have been the owners of the club, others have been honorary chairmen. Here is a complete list of Roma chairmen from 1927 until the present day.

Name	Years
Italo Foschi	1927–28
Renato Sacerdoti	1928–35
Vittorio Scialoja	1935–36
Igino Betti	1936–41
Edgardo Bazzini	1941–44
Pietro Baldassarre	1944–49
Pier Carlo Restagno	1949–52
Romolo Vaselli	1952
Renato Sacerdoti	1952–58
Anacleto Gianni	1958–62
Francesco Marini-Dettina	1962–65
Franco Evangelisti	1965–68

Name	Years
Francesco Ranucci	1968–69
Alvaro Marchini	1969–71
Gaetano Anzalone	1971–79
Dino Viola	1979–91
Flora Viola	1991
Giuseppe Ciarrapico	1991–93
Ciro Di Martino	1993
Franco Sensi	1993–08
Rosella Sensi	2008–11
Roberto Cappelli	2011
Thomas R. DiBenedetto	2011–12
James Pallotta	2012–2020
Dan Friedkin	2020-present

== List based on years of chairmanship ==
Below is a list of chairmen based in order of terms.

15 years

- Franco Sensi (1993-08)

13 years

- Renato Sacerdoti (1928–35 and 1952–58)

12 years

- Dino Viola (1979–91)

8 years

- Gaetano Anzalone (1971–79)
- James Pallotta (2012-2020)

5 years

- Hyginus Betti (1936–41)
- Peter Baldassarre (1944–49)

4 years

- Anacleto Gianni (1958–62)

3 years

- Pier Carlo Restagno (1949–52)
- Francesco Marini Dettina (1962–65)
- Franco Evangelisti (1965–68)
- Rosella Sensi (2008–11)

2 years

- Edgardo Bazzini (1941–43)
- Alvaro Marchini (1969–71)
- Giuseppe Ciarrapico (1991–93)

1 year

- Italo Foschi (1927–28)
- Scialoja Antonio (1935–36)
- Francesco Ranucci (1968–69)
- Thomas DiBenedetto (2011–12)
- Dan Friedkin (2020-present)

less than one year

- Romulus Vasey (1952)
- Flora Viola (1991)
- Ciro Di Martino (1993)
- Roberto Cappelli (2011)
