= AS Roma Hall of Fame =

Footballers who played for the Rome club

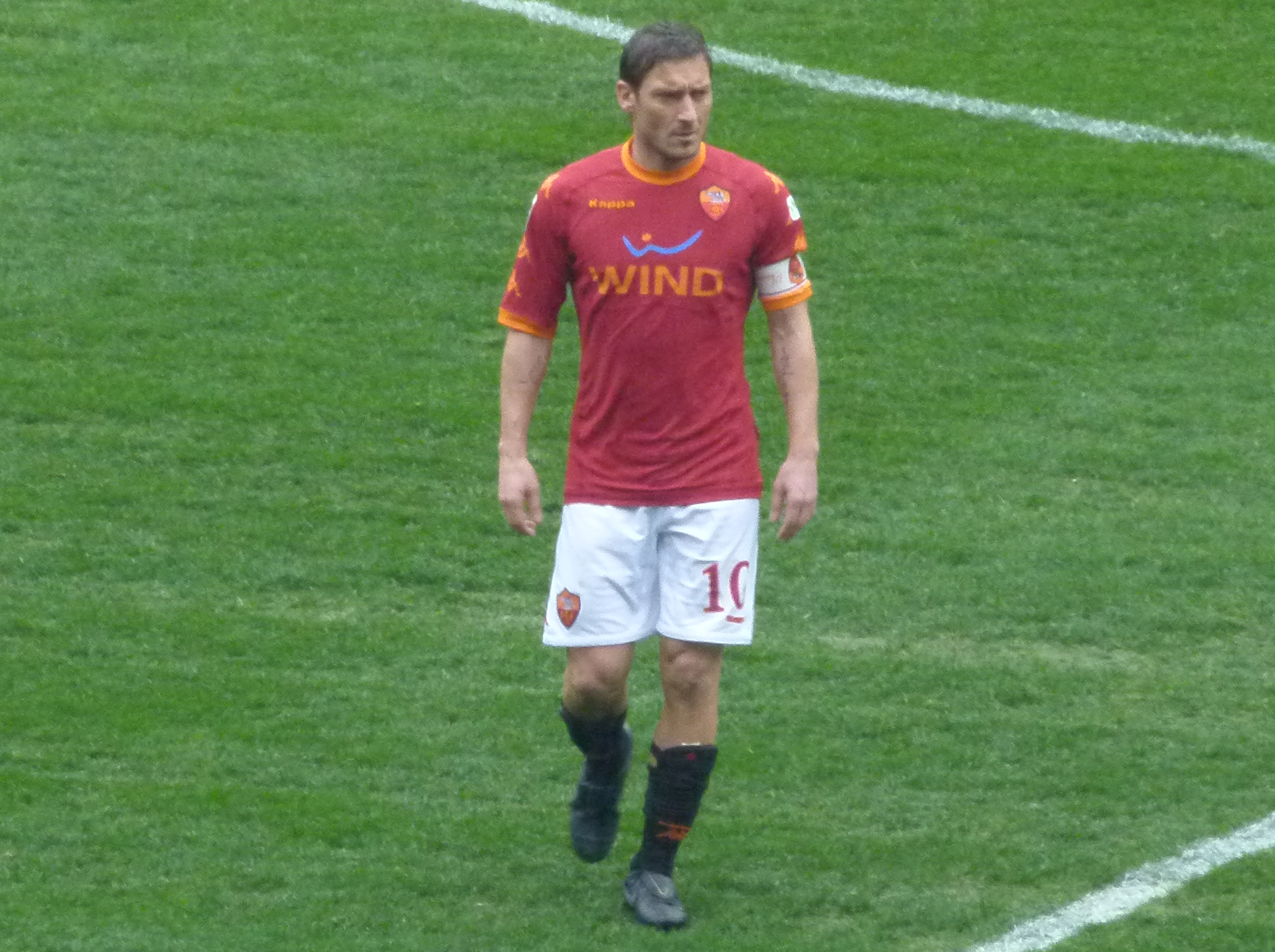
Francesco Totti, most capped player and number-one goalscorer in Roma's history.

This is a list of AS Roma players who have been inducted into the club's Hall of Fame.

AS Roma's Hall of Fame has been launched in 2012 as part of the initiatives for the club's 85th anniversary.

Exceptionally for the starting 2012 Class, eleven players were chosen through an on-line voting process from an initial list of 55 retired players, composed by one goalkeeper (Franco Tancredi), one right-back (Cafu), two central defenders (Giacomo Losi and Aldair), one left-back (Francesco Rocca), two midfielders (Fulvio Bernardini and Agostino Di Bartolomei), one playmaker (Paulo Roberto Falcão), and three strikers (Bruno Conti, Roberto Pruzzo and Amedeo Amadei).

In the following years, the number of players elected has been intentionally reduced.

In 2017, following the retirement of Roma legend Francesco Totti, no players but him were included into the list.

== List of Hall of Fame players ==
Position
GK	Goalkeeper
DF	Defender
MF	Midfielder
FW	Forward

HoF Class	Player	Pos.	Roma career	Apps.	Goals	Honours with Roma	Ref.
2012	(Italy) Franco Tancredi	GK	1978–1990	382	0	1982–83 Serie A, 1979–80 Coppa Italia, 1980–81 Coppa Italia, 1983–84 Coppa Italia, 1985–86 Coppa Italia	
2012	(Brazil) Cafu	DF	1997–2003	218	8	2000–01 Serie A, 2001 Supercoppa Italiana	
2012	(Italy) Giacomo Losi	DF	1954–1969	455	2	1960–61 Inter-Cities Fairs Cup, 1963–64 Coppa Italia, 1968–69 Coppa Italia	
2012	(Brazil) Aldair	DF	1990–2003	415	20	2000–01 Serie A, 1990–91 Coppa Italia, 2001 Supercoppa Italiana	
2012	(Italy) Francesco Rocca	DF	1972–1981	170	2	1979–80 Coppa Italia, 1980–81 Coppa Italia	
2012	(Italy) Fulvio Bernardini	MF	1927–1934; 1938–1939	303	47	–	
2012	(Italy) Agostino Di Bartolomei	MF	1972–1984	310	69	1982–83 Serie A, 1979–80 Coppa Italia, 1980–81 Coppa Italia, 1983–84 Coppa Italia	
2012	(Brazil) Paulo Roberto Falcão	MF	1980–1985	152	27	1982–83 Serie A, 1980–81 Coppa Italia, 1983–84 Coppa Italia	
2012	(Italy) Bruno Conti	MF	1973–1975; 1976–1991	402	47	1982–83 Serie A, 1979–80 Coppa Italia, 1980–81 Coppa Italia, 1983–84 Coppa Italia, 1985–86 Coppa Italia, 1990–91 Coppa Italia	
2012	(Italy) Roberto Pruzzo	FW	1978–1988	315	138	1982–83 Serie A, 1979–80 Coppa Italia, 1980–81 Coppa Italia, 1983–84 Coppa Italia, 1985–86 Coppa Italia	
2012	(Italy) Amedeo Amadei	FW	1936–1938; 1939–1948	243	111	1941–42 Serie A	
2013	(Italy) Attilio Ferraris IV	MF	1927–1934; 1938–1939	231	4	–	
2013	(Italy) Sebastiano Nela	DF	1981–1993	397	19	1982–83 Serie A, 1983–84 Coppa Italia, 1985–86 Coppa Italia, 1990–91 Coppa Italia	
2013	(Italy) Giuseppe Giannini	MF	1981–1996	437	75	1982–83 Serie A, 1983–84 Coppa Italia, 1985–86 Coppa Italia, 1990–91 Coppa Italia	
2013	(Italy) Vincenzo Montella	FW	1999–2006; 2008–2009	258	102	2000–01 Serie A, 2001 Supercoppa Italiana	
2014	(Uruguay) (Italy) Alcides Ghiggia	RW	1953–1961	213	19	1960–61 Inter-Cities Fairs Cup	
2014	(France) Vincent Candela	DF	1997–2005	289	16	2000–01 Serie A, 2001 Supercoppa Italiana	
2014	(Italy) Carlo Ancelotti	MF	1979–1987	227	17	1982–83 Serie A, 1979–80 Coppa Italia, 1980–81 Coppa Italia, 1983–84 Coppa Italia, 1985–86 Coppa Italia	
2014	(Germany) Rudi Völler	FW	1987–1992	198	68	1990–91 Coppa Italia	
2015	(Italy) Guido Masetti	GK	1930–1943	364	0	1941–42 Serie A	
2015	(Italy) Sergio Santarini	DF	1968–1981	431	6	1968–69 Coppa Italia, 1979–80 Coppa Italia, 1980–81 Coppa Italia	
2015	(Italy) Damiano Tommasi	MF	1996–2006	351	21	2000–01 Serie A, 2001 Supercoppa Italiana	
2015	(Argentina) Gabriel Batistuta	FW	2000–2003	87	33	2000–01 Serie A, 2001 Supercoppa Italiana	
2016	(Italy) Giorgio Carpi	MF	1927–1936	45	0	–	
2016	(Brazil) Toninho Cerezo	MF	1983–1986	104	25	1983–84 Coppa Italia, 1985–86 Coppa Italia	
2016	(Italy) Giancarlo De Sisti	MF	1960–1964; 1974–1979	279	29	1960–61 Inter-Cities Fairs Cup, 1963–64 Coppa Italia	
2016	(Italy) Arcadio Venturi	MF	1948–1957	290	18	–	
2017	(Italy) Francesco Totti	FW	1992–2017	786	307	2000–01 Serie A, 2006–07 Coppa Italia, 2007–08 Coppa Italia, 2001 Supercoppa Italiana, 2007 Supercoppa Italiana	
2018	(Italy) Mario De Micheli	DF	1927–1932	75	0	–	
2018	(Italy) Giuliano Taccola	FW	1967–1969	45	18	–	
2018	(Italy) Rodolfo Volk	FW	1928–1933	161	106	–	
