= Walter Sabatini =

Italian footballer and director of football

Personal information
- Date of birth: 2 May 1955 (age 71)
- Place of birth: Marsciano, Italy
- Position: Midfielder

Team information
- Current team: (general manager)

Youth career
- Perugia

Senior career*
Years	Team	Apps	(Gls)
1973–1975	Perugia	28	(1)
1975–1976	Varese	10	(0)
1976–1977	Roma	10	(0)
1977–1978	Perugia	1	(0)
1978–1979	Palermo	0	(0)
1979–1980	Vicenza	10	(1)
1980–1981	Siracusa	23	(2)
1981–1982	Venezia	26	(2)
1982–1983	Parma	16	(2)
1983–1984	Pro Patria	29	(3)
- * Club domestic league appearances and goals

Walter Sabatini (born 2 May 1955) is an Italian former football player turned director of football.

== Playing career ==
A midfielder, Sabatini made his professional debut with Perugia in 1973, playing at Serie B level with the Umbrian club. After a short stint at Varese, he was acquired by Roma in 1976, where he had the chance to make his Serie A debut. He successively returned to Perugia, where he was prevented from playing because of a muscular injury that did not allow him to play any games for two years, including a season with no appearances at Palermo. After two years of inactivity, Sabatini found himself out of the limelight and spent the following years playing in the lower ranks of Italian professional football before retiring in 1984.

== Coaching and non-playing career ==
=== Early years ===
In 1986, he returned to Perugia, this time as an assistant coach in the youth system. He was then promoted to youth sector chief in 1990 and first-team assistant to head coach Paolo Ammoniaci.

In 1992, he went on to join Lazio, where he served as youth sector chief together with Giuseppe Dossena and Roberto Ottaviani. In 1994, he was appointed director of football of Triestina. In 1998, he left Triestina to become director of football at third division side Arezzo, with Serse Cosmi as head coach. Both men left Arezzo in 2000 to join Perugia.

=== Director of football at Lazio ===
In 2004, Sabatini left Perugia to become director of football at Lazio. He worked for four years at Lazio and was instrumental in signing players such as Aleksandar Kolarov, Valon Behrami, Fernando Muslera, Stephan Lichtsteiner, Modibo Diakité, Ștefan Radu, Libor Kozák and Luis Pedro Cavanda.

=== Director of football at Palermo ===
In 2008, after his contract with Lazio expired, Sabatini went on to fill the same position at Palermo, penning a two-year contract with the Rosanero club. He agreed a one-year extension to his contract in May 2010.

His most notable signings included Afriyie Acquah (who was signed as an unknown player at the age of 17), Abel Hernández, Josip Iličić (who was discovered during a UEFA Europa League qualifying game against Slovenian side Maribor), Michel Morganella, Javier Pastore, Matteo Darmian and Ezequiel Muñoz.

On 2 November 2010, Palermo confirmed Sabatini had resigned from his role as director of football of Palermo due to "strictly personal reasons."

=== Director of football at Roma ===
In the summer of 2011, Sabatini was hired by James Pallotta to replace Daniele Prade as Roma's sporting director. Over the course of three years, he rebuilt Roma and orchestrated the near-complete removal of all of the side's below-average players who carried high wages, previously brought in from the Franco Sensi era. He has also succeeded in signing Erik Lamela and Marquinhos, as well as their sales to Tottenham Hotspur and Paris Saint-Germain respectively for a significant profit in 2013. He then utilized the funds to purchase players Kevin Strootman, Gervinho, Morgan De Sanctis, Radja Nainggolan and Mehdi Benatia. One year later, all five signings played solid seasons for the club; however, Benatia was later sold to Bayern Munich for €26 million, double the amount he was initially purchased for from Udinese.

With the funds, Sabatini managed to purchase three additional center-backs in the summer of 2014 and was able to snatch Juventus's main target in the transfer window, Juan Iturbe, from Verona. For his efforts the previous season, Sabatini was awarded the best director of football award for the 2013–14 Serie A season. He was normally known for signing short-term deals, but he agreed upon a three-year extension with Roma in 2014 for the first time.

In addition, his main achievements during the spell at AS Roma, were the acquisitions and subsequent resale, for substantial profits, of Alisson Becker and Momo Salah to Liverpool FC in 2018 and 2017, respectively.

=== Director of football at Inter and Jiangsu (Suning Sports Group) ===
On 10 May 2017, Sabatini was officially announced by Suning as technical co-ordinator for both of their clubs: Inter and Jiangsu Suning.

On 28 March 2018, Sabatini resigned as technical co-ordinator at Inter and Jiangsu Suning.

=== Director of Football at Bologna and Montreal Impact ===
On 17 June 2019 Sabatini was appointed director of football/technical director of Bologna and Montreal. His departure from Bologna and Montreal was announced on 27 September 2021.

=== Director of Football at Salernitana ===
On 14 January 2022, Sabatini was appointed director of football/technical director of Serie A team Salernitana. Hired following a club takeover by entrepreneur Danilo Iervolino, Sabatini appointed Davide Nicola and signed more than ten players in the January transfer window in a last-ditched attempt to save the club from relegation. Thanks to a change in form by the end of the season, Salernitana escaped relegation in the season's final game.

Despite informal announcements by club owner Iervolino stating his intention to confirm Sabatini, on 2 June 2022, Salernitana formally announced he had parted company with the sporting director due to disagreements with the board.

=== General Manager at Salernitana ===
On 19 December 2023, Sabatini agreed to return to Salernitana, this time as a general manager in an attempt to change the club's fortunes as they were bottom-placed in the Serie A league table.

== Personal life ==
Sabatini's brother Carlo Sabatini is also involved in football, having last served as head coach of Serie B club Padova, which he led to win the Lega Pro Prima Divisione playoffs during the 2008–09 season.

Sabatini is well known in Italy for his smoking habit. During a press conference at Suning Training Center in Milan, Italy, he notably asked for a pause while a journalist was asking him a question so he could go outside for a smoke. On 10 September 2018, Sabatini was rushed to the Intensive Care Unit at the Hospital of Rome after having intense difficulty breathing and suffering a collapsed lung.
