= Paolo Giovannelli =

Italian footballer (born 1960)

Personal information
- Date of birth: 1 October 1960 (age 66)
- Place of birth: Cecina, Italy
- Height: 1.78 m (5 ft 10 in)
- Position: Midfielder

Senior career*
Years	Team	Apps	(Gls)
1976–1977	Cecina	23	(4)
1977–1983	Roma	40	(1)
1983–1987	Pisa	98	(4)
1987–1990	Ascoli	83	(11)
1990–1992	Cesena	34	(0)

International career
1980	Italy U-21	4	(0)
- * Club domestic league appearances and goals

Paolo Giovannelli (born 1 October 1960 in Cecina) is an Italian former professional footballer who played as a midfielder.

== Club career ==
Throughout his club career, Giovannelli played 11 seasons (172 games, 12 goals) in the Italian Serie A for A.S. Roma, Pisa Calcio, Ascoli Calcio 1898 and A.C. Cesena.

He is mostly remembered by A.S. Roma fans for his winning goal that he scored on 2 March 1980 in a Derby della Capitale game against S.S. Lazio; he scored from a free-kick with five minutes remaining to play in the game, which was the only league goal he ever scored in his Roma career.

His tine at the club was hampered by a serious injury he suffered in 1981, which greatly limited his appearances in the next three seasons.

== International career ==
Although Giovannelli was never capped for the Italy senior side, at international level, he represented the Italy U21 side on four occasions in 1982, and also took part at UEFA European Under-21 Football Championship with the team that year.

== Honours ==
Roma

- Serie A champion: 1982–83.
- Coppa Italia winner: 1979–80, 1980–81.
