= Mario De Micheli =

Italian footballer

Personal information
- Date of birth: 3 February 1906
- Place of birth: Rome, Italy
- Position: Defender

Senior career*
Years	Team	Apps	(Gls)
1924–1927	Fortitudo Roma	19	(1)
1927–1932	Roma	70	(0)
- * Club domestic league appearances and goals

Mario De Micheli (born 3 February 1906 in Rome) was an Italian professional footballer who played as a defender.

He played for 3 seasons in the Italian Serie A with A.S. Roma between 1927 and 1932, collecting 75 appearances (70 in league play), but scored no goals for the club. He previously also played for Fortitudo between 1924 and 1927, collecting 19 league appearances and scoring one goal. In 2018, De Micheli was inducted into the A.S. Roma Hall of Fame.

== Honours ==
Roma

- Coppa CONI: 1927–28

Individual

- A.S. Roma Hall of Fame: 2018
