= 1979–80 Coppa Italia =

Tournament details
- Country: Italy
- Dates: 22 Aug 1979 – 17 May 1980
- Teams: 36

Final positions
- Champions: Roma (3rd title)
- Runners-up: Torino

Tournament statistics
- Matches played: 83
- Goals scored: 168 (2.02 per match)
- Top goal scorer(s): Roberto Pruzzo; Oscar Damiani (6 goals)

The 1979–80 Coppa Italia, the 33rd Coppa Italia was an Italian Football Federation domestic cup competition.

Roma won the cup after defeat Torino on penalty.

== Group stage ==
=== Group 1 ===
Pos	Team	Pld	W	D	L	GF	GA	GD	Pts
1	Roma	4	3	1	0	6	3	+3	7
2	Ascoli	4	2	2	0	8	2	+6	6
3	Perugia	4	1	2	1	1	1	0	4
4	Sampdoria	4	1	0	3	4	5	−1	2
5	Bari	4	0	1	3	1	9	−8	1

=== Group 2 ===
Pos	Team	Pld	W	D	L	GF	GA	GD	Pts
1	Torino	4	4	0	0	7	2	+5	8
2	Catanzaro	4	2	1	1	4	3	+1	5
3	Palermo	4	1	2	1	4	2	+2	4
4	Parma	4	0	2	2	1	4	−3	2
5	Lecce	4	0	1	3	4	9	−5	1

=== Group 3 ===
Pos	Team	Pld	W	D	L	GF	GA	GD	Pts
1	Ternana	4	1	3	0	5	4	+1	5
2	Fiorentina	4	2	1	1	3	3	0	5
3	Avellino	4	1	2	1	3	2	+1	4
4	Como	4	1	2	1	3	3	0	4
5	Hellas Verona	4	0	2	2	2	4	−2	2

=== Group 4 ===
Pos	Team	Pld	W	D	L	GF	GA	GD	Pts
1	Internazionale	4	4	0	0	11	2	+9	8
2	SPAL	4	2	1	1	3	4	−1	5
3	Bologna	4	2	0	2	5	4	+1	4
4	Atalanta	4	0	2	2	1	5	−4	2
5	Sambenedettese	4	0	1	3	1	6	−5	1

=== Group 5 ===
Pos	Team	Pld	W	D	L	GF	GA	GD	Pts
1	Lazio	4	3	1	0	9	1	+8	7
2	Udinese	4	3	1	0	5	0	+5	7
3	Brescia	4	1	1	2	1	3	−2	3
4	Pistoiese	4	1	0	3	3	5	−2	2
5	Matera	4	0	1	3	0	9	−9	1

=== Group 6 ===
Pos	Team	Pld	W	D	L	GF	GA	GD	Pts
1	Milan	4	3	1	0	7	3	+4	7
2	Genoa	4	2	1	1	6	3	+3	5
3	Monza	4	1	2	1	5	4	+1	4
4	Pescara	4	1	2	1	5	6	−1	4
5	Pisa	4	0	0	4	3	10	−7	0

=== Group 7 ===
Pos	Team	Pld	W	D	L	GF	GA	GD	Pts
1	Napoli	4	2	2	0	8	4	+4	6
2	Cagliari	4	2	1	1	7	6	+1	5
3	Cesena	4	2	0	2	6	7	−1	4
4	Taranto	4	2	0	2	3	4	−1	4
5	Vicenza	4	0	1	3	4	7	−3	1

== Quarter-finals ==
Join the defending champion: Juventus.

Team 1	Agg.	Team 2	1st leg	2nd leg
Milan	2-6	Roma	0-4	2-2
Napoli	2-2 (a)	Ternana	2-1	0-1
Torino	0-0 (p: 4-3)	Lazio	0-0	0-0
Internazionale	1-2	Juventus	1-2	0-0

p=after penalty shoot-out

== Semi-finals ==
Team 1	Agg.	Team 2	1st leg	2nd leg
Ternana	1-3	Roma	1-1	0-2
Juventus	0-0 (p: 2-4)	Torino	0-0	0-0

p=after penalty shoot-out

== Final ==
17 May 1980
17:30

Roma	0–0 (a.e.t.)	Torino
Penalties
Giovannelli (penalty missed); Conti (penalty scored); De Nadai (penalty missed); Di Bartolomei (penalty missed); Santarini (penalty scored); Ancelotti (penalty scored)	3–2	(penalty scored) Mandorlini; (penalty scored) Mariani; (penalty missed) Greco; (penalty missed) Graziani; (penalty missed) Pecci; (penalty missed) Zaccarelli

Stadio Olimpico, Rome
Referee: Alberto Michelotti

== Top goalscorers ==
Rank	Player	Club	Goals
1	(Italy) Roberto Pruzzo	Roma	6
1	(Italy) Oscar Damiani	Napoli	6
3	(Italy) Maurizio Iorio	Ascoli	4
3	(Italy) Nicola Zanone	Vicenza	4
3	(Italy) Alessandro Altobelli	Internazionale	4
3	(Italy) Luigi Piras	Cagliari	4
3	(Italy) Stefano Chiodi	Milan	4
