= Rosella Sensi =

Italian sports executive

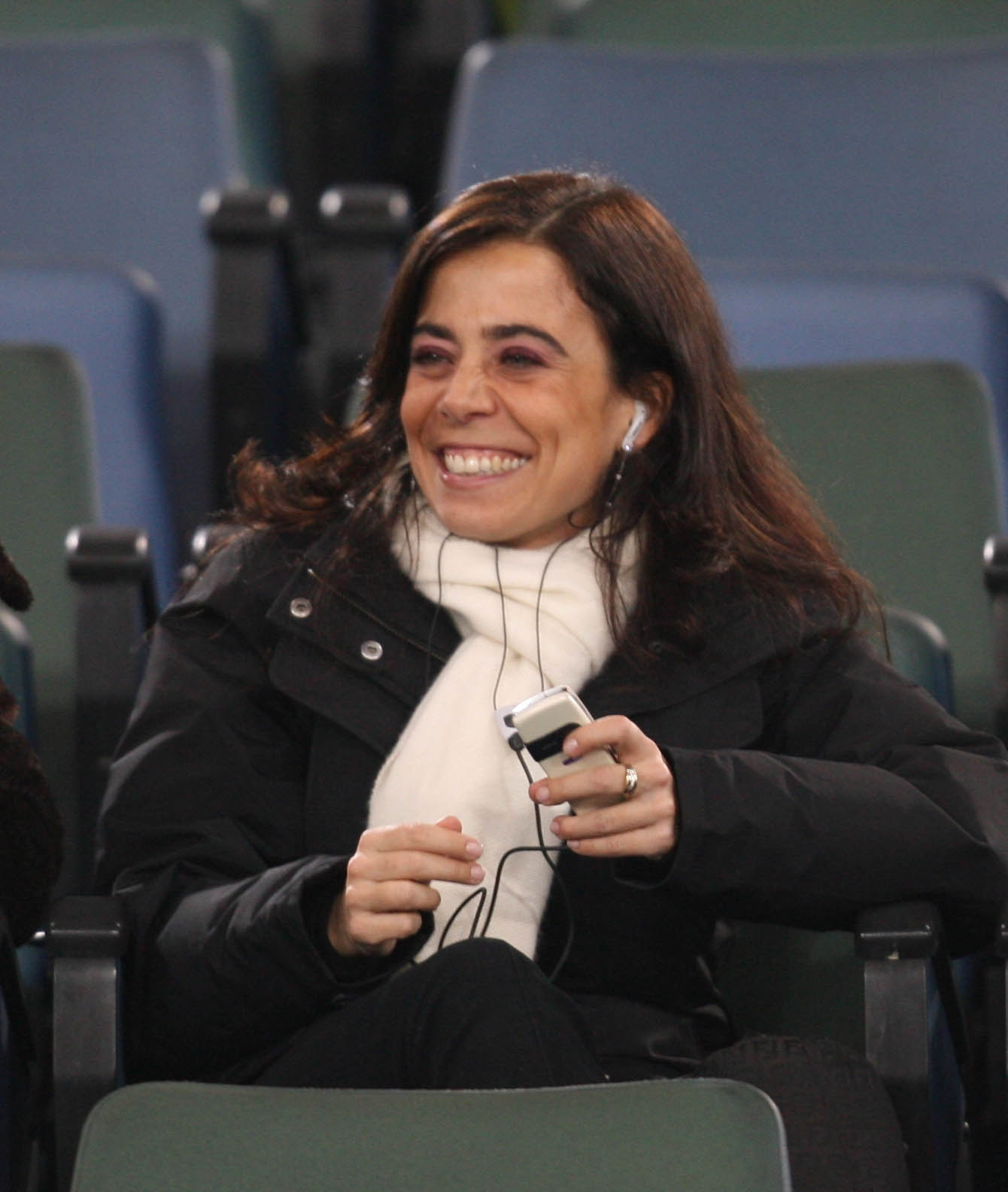
- Born: 18 December 1971 (age 54); Rome, Italy
- Education: Libera Università Internazionale degli Studi Sociali Guido Carli
- Occupation: Entrepreneur
- Known for: former owner, CEO & chairperson of A.S. Roma
- Title: chairperson of A.S. Roma
- Term: 2008–2011
- Predecessor: Franco Sensi
- Successor: Roberto Cappelli (interim)
- Spouse: Marco Staffoli (2007–present)
- Children: 1
- Parents: Franco Sensi (father); Maria Lando (mother)

Rosella Sensi (born 18 December 1971) is an Italian entrepreneur and professional sports executive. She was the chairperson of the Italian professional football (soccer) club Associazione Sportiva Roma (A.S. Roma, usually referred to simply as Roma) from 2008 to 2011.

== Career ==
She is a graduate of the Libera Università Internazionale degli Studi Sociali Guido Carli (LUISS). She has held the post of CEO (Italian: amministratore delegato) and, since 28 August 2008, also the chairperson of the board of directors (Italian: presidente del consiglio di amministrazione) of Roma, replacing her father, Franco Sensi, who was the chairperson until he died on 17 August 2008.

She is the second woman to hold the office of chairperson of the club. Previously, Flora Viola, the widow of Dino Viola, succeeded her husband as chairperson of the club when he died in 1991. Rosella Sensi was one of two women in 2000s to lead a football club in Italy's top professional football league, Serie A with Francesca Menarini served as the chairperson of Bologna F.C. 1909.

Beginning in 2006, Sensi was elected between the Serie A clubs to be a member of the board of Lega Calcio which she served as the vice-chairperson. Sensi was the first vice-chairperson of newly formed Lega Serie A in 2010.

On 31 March 2009, Sensi gave birth to a daughter, Livia.

On 8 July 2010, due to debts of her family company Compagnia Italpetroli to UniCredit (the bank already owned 49% share of Italpetroli back to Capitalia era), she agreed to sell A.S. Roma. During the interim period, A.S Roma was de facto owned by the bank which was seeking an outside buyer and Sensi continually stayed in charge as chairperson .

On 31 March 2011, she resigned from her post as a consortium led by American businessman Thomas DiBenedetto had agreed to a takeover deal for the club. On 16 April the sales was completed for €70.3 million, to transfer Roma 2000 S.r.l. (a holding company with AS Roma SpA, ASR Real Estate S.r.l. and Brand Management S.r.l. as subsidiaries) from Compagnia Italpetroli to "NEEP Roma Holding", a 60–40 joint venture by AS Roma SPV LCC and UniCredit.

UniCredit also received several other assets from Compagnia Italpetroli as a debt settlement.
