= Arcadio Venturi =

Italian footballer (1929–2025)

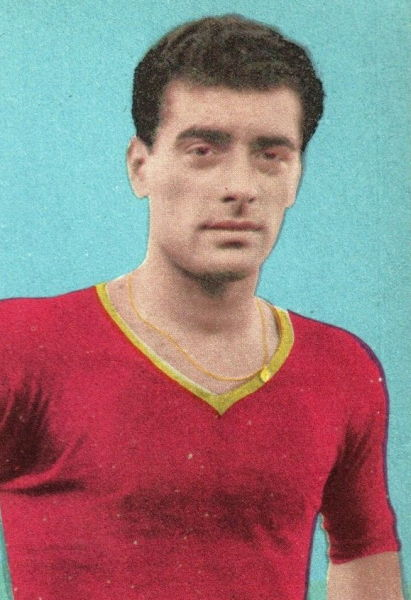

Personal information
- Date of birth: 18 May 1929
- Place of birth: Vignola, Italy
- Date of death: 2 December 2025 (aged 96)
- Height: 1.77 m (5 ft 10 in)
- Position: Midfielder

Senior career*
Years	Team	Apps	(Gls)
1948–1957	Roma	288	(18)
1957–1960	Inter Milan	57	(0)
1960–1961	Brescia	27	(2)
Total		372	(20)

International career
1951–1953	Italy	6	(1)

Managerial career
- 1968–1986: Inter Milan (youth)
- 1986–1991: Inter Milan (assistant coach)
- 1991–1994: Juventus (assistant coach)
- * Club domestic league appearances and goals

Arcadio Venturi (Italian pronunciation: [arˈkaːdjo venˈtuːri]; 18 May 1929 – 2 December 2025) was an Italian professional footballer who played as a midfielder. He represented Italy at the 1952 Summer Olympics. He died on 2 December 2025, at the age of 96.

== Honours ==
Individual

- A.S. Roma Hall of Fame: 2016
