= Attilio Ferraris =

Italian footballer (1904-1947)

Attilio Ferraris IV
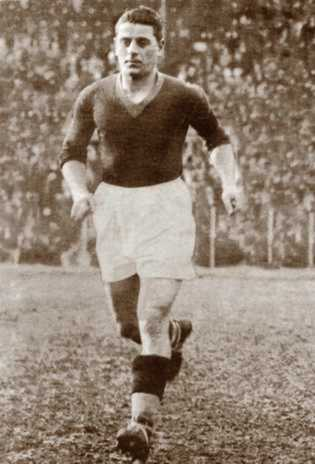
- Ferraris with Roma in 1930

Personal information
- Date of birth: 26 March 1904
- Place of birth: Rome, Italy
- Date of death: 8 May 1947 (aged 43)
- Place of death: Montecatini Terme, Italy
- Height: 1.70 m (5 ft 7 in)
- Position: Defensive midfielder

Senior career*
| Years | Team | Apps | (Gls) |
| 1922–1927 | Fortitudo Roma | 61 | (3) |
| 1927–1934 | Roma | 198 | (2) |
| 1934–1936 | Lazio | 39 | (0) |
| 1936–1938 | Bari | 54 | (0) |
| 1938–1939 | Roma | 12 | (0) |
| 1939–1940 | Catania | 15 | (0) |
| 1943–1944 | Elettronica Roma | 4 | (0) |
| Total | | 383 | (5) |

International career
| 1926–1935 | Italy | 28 | (0) |
Medal record
Italy
Summer Olympics
| Bronze medal – third place | 1928 Amsterdam |
Central European International Cup
| Gold medal – first place | 1927–30 Central European International Cup |
Central European International Cup
| Silver medal – second place | 1931–32 Central European International Cup |
FIFA World Cup
| Gold medal – first place | 1934 Italy |
- * Club domestic league appearances and goals

Attilio Ferraris IV (Italian pronunciation: [atˈtiːljo ferˈraːris]; 26 March 1904 – 8 May 1947) was an Italian footballer who played as a defensive midfielder.

== Club career ==
Ferraris played ten seasons (254 games, two goals) in the Serie A, for AS Roma, SS Lazio and AS Bari.

== International career ==
With the Italy national team, Ferraris won the bronze medal at the 1928 Olympics, but he did not play in any matches. He was playing in the 1927–30 Central European International Cup winning gold & in the 1931–32 Central European International Cup winning silver.

He was also a very important part of the World Cup-winning team of 1934, making it to the tournament's All-Star Team for his performances.

Ferraris died in 1947 after collapsing while playing in an old-timers' match.

== Honours ==
Italy

- FIFA World Cup: 1934
- Central European International Cup: 1927–30; Runner-up: 1931–32
- Summer Olympics: Bronze Medal 1928

Individual

- FIFA World Cup Team of the Tournament: 1934
- AS Roma Hall of Fame: 2013
