= Thomas R. DiBenedetto =

American entrepreneur and chairman (born 1949)

- Born: 3 June 1949 (age 77); Boston
- Occupations: Entrepreneur and chairman

Thomas Richard DiBenedetto (Boston, 3 June 1949), is an American entrepreneur and was the 22nd chairman of the Italian football club Roma, since September 27, 2011 to August 27, 2012, when he was succeeded by James Pallotta.

DiBenedetto is a partner in Fenway Sports Group, who own the Boston Red Sox and Liverpool, among other sport properties.

== Roma ==
On 16 April 2011, Thomas R. DiBenedetto's through "DiBenedetto AS Roma LLC" (incorporated in Delaware, which he owned 25%) and UniCredit bought 67.1% shares of A.S. Roma S.p.A. from Sensi family's Italpetroli (by buying the shares of holding company "Roma 2000 S.r.l", although UniCredit already owned 40% shares of Italpetroli before the deal) for €60.3 million and formed a joint venture holding company NEEP Roma in a 60-40 ratio. The transaction date was scheduled on 31 July 2011. NEEP also bought the sister companies of AS Roma: "ASR Real Estate S.r.l." and "Brand Management S.r.l." valued €10 million.

"DiBenedetto AS Roma LLC" (later renamed AS Roma SPV, LLC) consists of 4 other shareholders (or 3 not counting the family trust), namely James Pallotta (25%) (of "Tudor Investment"), Michael Ruane (25%) (director of "TA Realty"; partially own the "DiBenedetto AS Roma LLC" through family trust for 22.5%) and Richard D'Amore (25%) (of "North Bridge Venture Partners" and Veeco).

The new company was planned a complete takeover and de-list the company from Borsa Italiana. However its failed. Zsolt Kohalmi later joined as the fifth member of investment committee of AS Roma SPV, LLC in 2014, made the five members have equal vote in the company, each hold 20% voting rights on AS Roma SPV, LCC. Kohalmi represented Starwood Capital Group which joined AS Roma SPV as the fifth shareholder. While Pallotta hold an additional 9% shares on NEEP Roma Holding since 2014 (through Raptor Holdco LLC), made Pallotta became the largest shareholder by indirect and direct ownership of shares, despite by voting rights, AS Roma SPV, LLC still collectively as the largest shareholder (held 91% shares of NEEP after acquiring 31% from UniCredit; NEEP had a majority voting rights and ownership on AS Roma SpA) due to no one having a majority voting rights on the board of AS Roma SPV, LLC.

Preceded by Roberto Cappelli	Chairman of Roma; 2011–2012	Succeeded by James Pallotta
