= James Pallotta =

American billionaire businessman (born 1958)

- Born: James Joseph Pallotta; March 13, 1958 (age 68); North End, Boston, Massachusetts, U.S.
- Education: University Of Massachusetts (BBA); Northeastern University (MBA)
- Occupation: Businessman
- Known for: Chairman and MD, Raptor Group; Partner, Tudor Investment Corporation; Shareholder, Boston Basketball Partners

James Joseph Pallotta (born March 13, 1958) is an American billionaire businessman. In 2009, he founded Raptor Group, a private investment company. Prior to forming Raptor, Pallotta was vice chairman at Tudor Investment Corporation. He was co-owner and chairman of the Italian football club A.S. Roma from 2011 to 2020; co-owner and executive board member of the National Basketball Association's Boston Celtics, and co-owner of esports franchise Fnatic.

== Early life ==
Pallotta was born in 1958 in Boston to a mother from Canosa di Puglia, Apulia and a father from Calabria, Italy. Along with sisters Carla and Christine Pallotta, he was raised in Boston's Italian North End neighborhood. His sisters own and operate NEBO Cucina & Enoteca in Boston's financial district. Pallotta earned a BBA at University of Massachusetts Amherst and an MBA at Northeastern University.

== Professional background ==
=== Raptor Group ===
Pallotta founded Raptor Group, a private investment company with offices in Boston, New York City, Miami, London, and Abu Dhabi. Raptor focuses on various industries including sports, consumer, technology, media, entertainment, and financial services. The group's substantial investments include Airbnb, Coupang, and Uber, and serves as Pallotta's family office.

=== A.S. Roma ===
Pallotta was involved with Italian football club AS Roma from 2011 to 2020, serving as president from 2012. During his tenure, the club finished as runners-up in Serie A three times and reached the semi-finals of the UEFA Champions League.

In August 2011, James Pallotta, along with fellow American investors Thomas R. DiBenedetto, Michael Ruane, and Richard D'Amore, became part of the first foreign ownership group to acquire the majority stake of a Serie A football club when they purchased Roma.

On 20 June 2012, Pallotta announced the creation of the AS Roma Hall of Fame and historical archive, an institution set up by the club to preserve and enhance its football heritage. Academy Award-winning composer and Roma fan, Ennio Morricone, was named as a member of the selection committee.

In August 2012, Pallotta became club president, succeeding Thomas R. DiBenedetto, and becoming the 23rd president in the club's history.

In Pallotta’s first season as Roma president, the club reached the Coppa Italia final. On 26 May 2013, Roma lost the final 1-0 to city rivals Lazio.

Ahead of the 2013-14 season, Pallotta hired Frenchman Rudi Garcia as the club’s new coach. Garcia began the season with a club record-breaking run of 10 Serie A victories. The club were eventually beaten to the title by Juventus, but a second-place finish saw the club qualify for the Champions League for the first time since 2010.

Under Pallotta, Sporting Director Walter Sabatini sought to buy undervalued players with high sell-on potential, as a means of competing within the parameters of UEFA financial fair play rules. The club’s outgoing transfer policy drew criticism and protests from certain sections of the fanbase – in particular the decision not to offer 35-year-old Roma captain Daniele De Rossi a new contract - and one Italian outlet dubbed Pallotta 'the King of Capital Gains'.

In 2014, Pallotta announced the launch of Roma Cares, a charitable foundation with the aim of promoting education and positive values through sports. During the 2014-15 season, under the stewardship of Garcia, Roma again finished second in Serie A to Juventus, with qualification for the Champions League secured for the second consecutive season.

On 8 September 2015, Pallotta announced the launch of ‘Football Cares’, a unique project that saw Roma work together with the United Nations Refugee Agency, International Rescue Committee, Save the Children and the Red Cross in an attempt to bring football clubs together to help address the Syrian refugee crisis. Pallotta kickstarted the initiative with a personal donation of €250,000, the club donated a further €250,000 and €75,000 was added by Roma investors.

A poor run of form in the league saw Pallotta replace Garcia in January 2016 with former Giallorossi coach, Luciano Spalletti, who steered the club to a third-place finish during the 2015-16 season.

On 7 June 2016, Pallotta handed club captain and Giallorossi legend Francesco Totti his final ever playing contract. Pallotta said: "He's earned this contract and now we want Francesco's final season on the pitch to be the start of a new era of success for Roma." During the 2016-17 season, Roma again finished second only to Juventus but set a host of records as Spalletti’s side earned more points (87) and had a better win percentage (73.7%) than ever before in club history. The team also scored 90 goals in Serie A, a new record for goals scored in a single league campaign, and won 28 out of 38 games, setting a new Serie A club record.

After Spalletti decided to leave the club following the conclusion of the 2016-17 season, Pallotta appointed former Giallorossi player Eusebio Di Francesco as head coach on 13 June 2017. On 29 August 2017, Pallotta sanctioned the signing of striker Patrik Schick from Sampdoria for a then-club record €42 million. In his first season as coach, Di Francesco led Roma to third place in Serie A and the semi-finals of the Champions League, the first time the club had reached that stage of the competition since 1984 and a first European semi-final since 1991. En route to the semi-final - which Roma eventually lost to Liverpool 7–6 on aggregate – the club staged one of the most notable comebacks in Champions League history on 10 April 2018, by beating Barcelona 3-0 at home, having lost the first leg 4-1. After the final whistle, Pallotta joined fans to celebrate on the streets and was later filmed leaping into the fountain on Rome's Piazza del Popolo. In the aftermath, Pallotta was fined €450 by local authorities for jumping into the fountain. "There was no point where I thought I shouldn't have done it," Pallotta told the BBC World Football Show. Following the incident, Pallotta donated €230,000 to put towards the maintenance and restoration of the Fontana del Pantheon in the middle of Rome.

On 15 June 2018, Pallotta announced the launch of the first ever official Roma Women’s team.

Following Roma’s elimination from the Champions League in the round of 16 against FC Porto, Pallotta dismissed head coach Eusebio Di Francesco on 7 March 2019.

On 8 March 2019, Pallotta appointed former Roma player Claudio Ranieri as head coach until 30 June 2019. Roma finished the 2018-19 Serie A season in 6th place, the first time the club had finished outside the top three in Serie A under Pallotta’s ownership since 2014.

On 10 June 2019, Pallotta announced the club had appointed Paulo Fonseca as the new Giallorossi head coach. On 10 March 2020, Roma was named in Fast Company’s prestigious annual list of the World’s Most Innovative Companies for 2020. Fast Company explained the inclusion of Roma on their list by stating: “The Italian soccer club, owned by American James Pallotta, took a unique approach last year to the annual news hype around signing new players. Roma decided to harness that attention for good by pairing each new player signing with a notice for a missing child. As a result, as of January 2020, the effort had helped locate six missing children.”

On 6 August 2020, Pallotta announced that he had agreed to sell the club to The Friedkin Group. In a statement released to the media, Pallotta said: “I am pleased to confirm we have reached an agreement with The Friedkin Group for the sale of Roma. Over the last month, Dan and Ryan Friedkin have demonstrated their total commitment to finalizing this deal and taking the club forward in a positive way. I am sure they will be great future owners for Roma.”

=== Tudor Investment Corporation ===
Prior to Raptor Group, Pallotta was a vice chairman and partner at Tudor Investment Corporation.

== Initiatives ==
Pallotta is a member of the board of trustees for the Santa Fe Institute and the board of trustees for Northeastern University. Pallotta serves on the board of directors for New Profit Inc. as well as the board of advisors for Tulco, LLC. He is also a member of the advisory council for the MIT Media Lab and the external advisory committee for the Center for Brains, Minds and Machines (CBMM) at MIT.
