= Sergio Santarini =

Italian footballer and coach

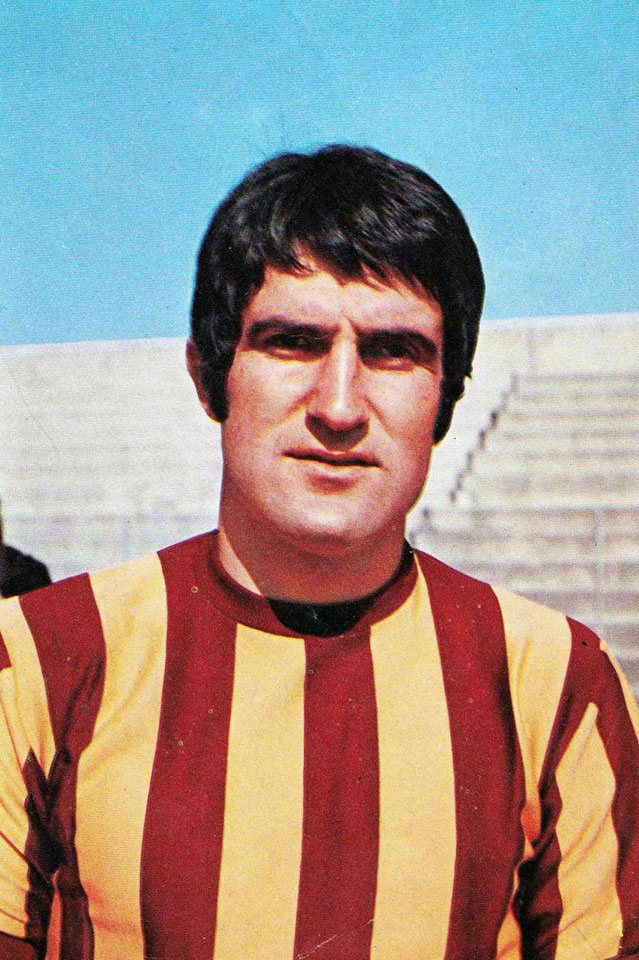
- Santarini with Roma in 1971

Personal information
- Date of birth: 10 September 1947 (age 79)
- Place of birth: Rimini, Italy
- Height: 1.80 m (5 ft 11 in)
- Position: Defender

Senior career*
Years	Team	Apps	(Gls)
1963–1967	Rimini	76	(3)
1967–1968	Internazionale	14	(0)
1968–1981	Roma	344	(5)
1981–1983	Catanzaro	48	(1)

International career
1971–1974	Italy	2	(1)

Managerial career
- 1987–1989: Fiorentina (assistant)
- * Club domestic league appearances and goals

Sergio Santarini (Italian pronunciation: [ˈsɛrdʒo santaˈriːni]; born 10 September 1947) is a retired Italian professional football player and coach who played as a defender.

== Club career ==
Throughout his career, Santarini played for Rimini, Internazionale, Roma, and Catanzaro, winning three Coppa Italia titles during his 13 years with Roma.

== International career ==
At international level, Santarini represented the Italy national football team on two occasions between 1971 and 1974, scoring once.

== Honours ==
=== Club ===
Roma

- Coppa Italia winner: 1968–69, 1979–80, 1980–81.
- Anglo-Italian Cup: 1971-1972

=== Individual ===
- A.S. Roma Hall of Fame: 2015
