= Giorgio Carpi =

Italian footballer

Personal information
- Date of birth: 1 November 1909
- Place of birth: Verona, Kingdom of Italy
- Date of death: 30 June 1998 (aged 88)
- Place of death: Rome, Italy
- Height: 1.65 m (5 ft 5 in)
- Position: Midfielder

Senior career*
Years	Team	Apps	(Gls)
1926–1927	Roman		
1927–1937	Roma	46	(0)
- * Club domestic league appearances and goals

Giorgio Carpi (1 November 1909 – 30 June 1998) was an Italian former professional footballer who played as a midfielder.

== Career ==
Carpi played 6 seasons (46 games, no goals) in the Italian Serie A for A.S. Roma. He is a member of the A.S. Roma Hall of Fame.
