= Franco Sensi =

Italian businessman (1926–2008)

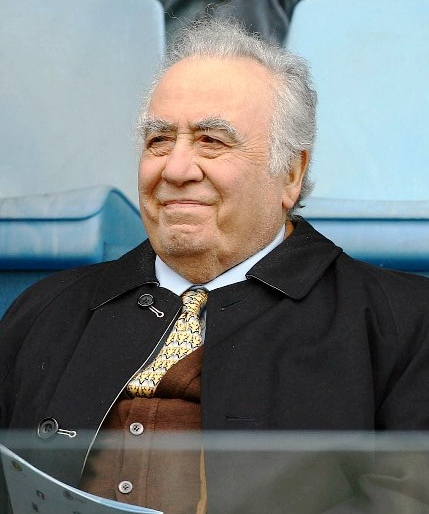
- Born: Francesco Sensi; 29 July 1926; Rome, Italy
- Died: 17 August 2008 (aged 82); Rome, Italy
- Occupation: Oil tycoon
- Known for: Former chairman of Roma
- Spouse: Maria Lando
- Children: Rosella Sensi

Francesco Sensi, Cavaliere del lavoro (29 July 1926 – 17 August 2008) was an Italian oil tycoon. He was born in Rome, where he lived throughout his entire life, though he also served time as mayor of Visso, the city where his family came from. He had been for fifteen years, until his death, chairman of Roma, the major football club of Rome. He took control of the club in May 1993, both with Pietro Mezzaroma, and he then became the chairman on 8 November 1993.

Under his chairmanship, Roma won one scudetto (2000–01), two Supercoppa Italiana (2001 and 2007) and two Coppa Italia (2006–07 and 2007–08).

His daughter Rosella used to be Roma General Manager as well. For Sensi's entrepreneurship activity, he has been given by the President of the Italian Republic the honour of Cavaliere del lavoro, on 2 June 1995.

Preceded by Ciro Di Martino	Chairman of Roma; 1993–2008	Succeeded by Rosella Sensi
