= AS Roma =

Association football club in Italy

Roma
- Full name: Associazione Sportiva Roma S.p.A.
- Nicknames: I Giallorossi (The Yellow and Reds); I Lupi (The Wolves); La Magica (The Magic One)
- Founded: 7 June 1927; 99 years ago
- Stadium: Stadio Olimpico
- Capacity: 70,634
- Owner: The Friedkin Group (95.97%)
- President: Dan Friedkin
- Head coach: Gian Piero Gasperini
- League: Serie A
- 2025–26: Serie A, 3rd of 20
- Website: www.asroma.com
Home colours	Away colours	Third colours

Associazione Sportiva Roma (Rome Sport Association; Italian pronunciation: [ˈroːma]) is a professional football club based in Rome, Italy. Founded by a merger in 1927, Roma has participated in the top tier of Italian football for all of its existence, except for the 1951–52 season. Roma has won Serie A three times, in 1941–42, 1982–83 and 2000–01, as well as nine Coppa Italia titles and two Supercoppa Italiana titles. In European competitions, Roma won the Inter-Cities Fairs Cup in 1960–61 and the inaugural UEFA Conference League in 2021–22, while they finished runners-up in the 1983–84 European Cup, the 1990–91 UEFA Cup and the 2022–23 UEFA Europa League.

Sixteen players have won the FIFA World Cup while playing at Roma: Attilio Ferraris and Enrique Guaita (1934); Guido Masetti and Eraldo Monzeglio (1934 and 1938); Aldo Donati and Pietro Serantoni (1938); Bruno Conti (1982); Rudi Völler and Thomas Berthold (1990); Aldair (1994); Vincent Candela (1998); Cafu (2002); Daniele De Rossi, Simone Perrotta and Francesco Totti (2006); Paulo Dybala (2022).

Since 1953, Roma has played home matches at the Stadio Olimpico, a venue the club shares with city rivals Lazio. With a capacity of over 72,000, the stadium is the second-largest of its kind in Italy, with only the San Siro able to seat more. The club plans to move to a new stadium, though it is yet to start construction. Having a strong local rivalry, Roma and Lazio contest the Derby della Capitale.

The club's home colours are carmine red and golden yellow, which gives Roma its nickname "I Giallorossi" ("The Yellow and Reds"). These colours have often been combined with white shorts. The club badge features a she-wolf, an allusion to the founding myth of Rome.

== History ==
=== Foundation ===
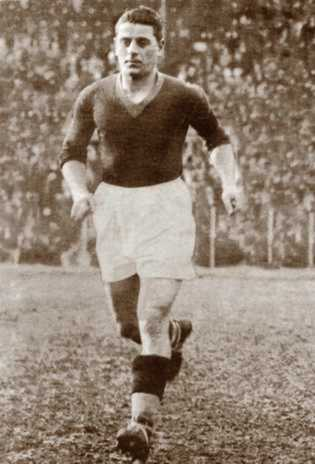
Attilio Ferraris, Roma captain during their formative years

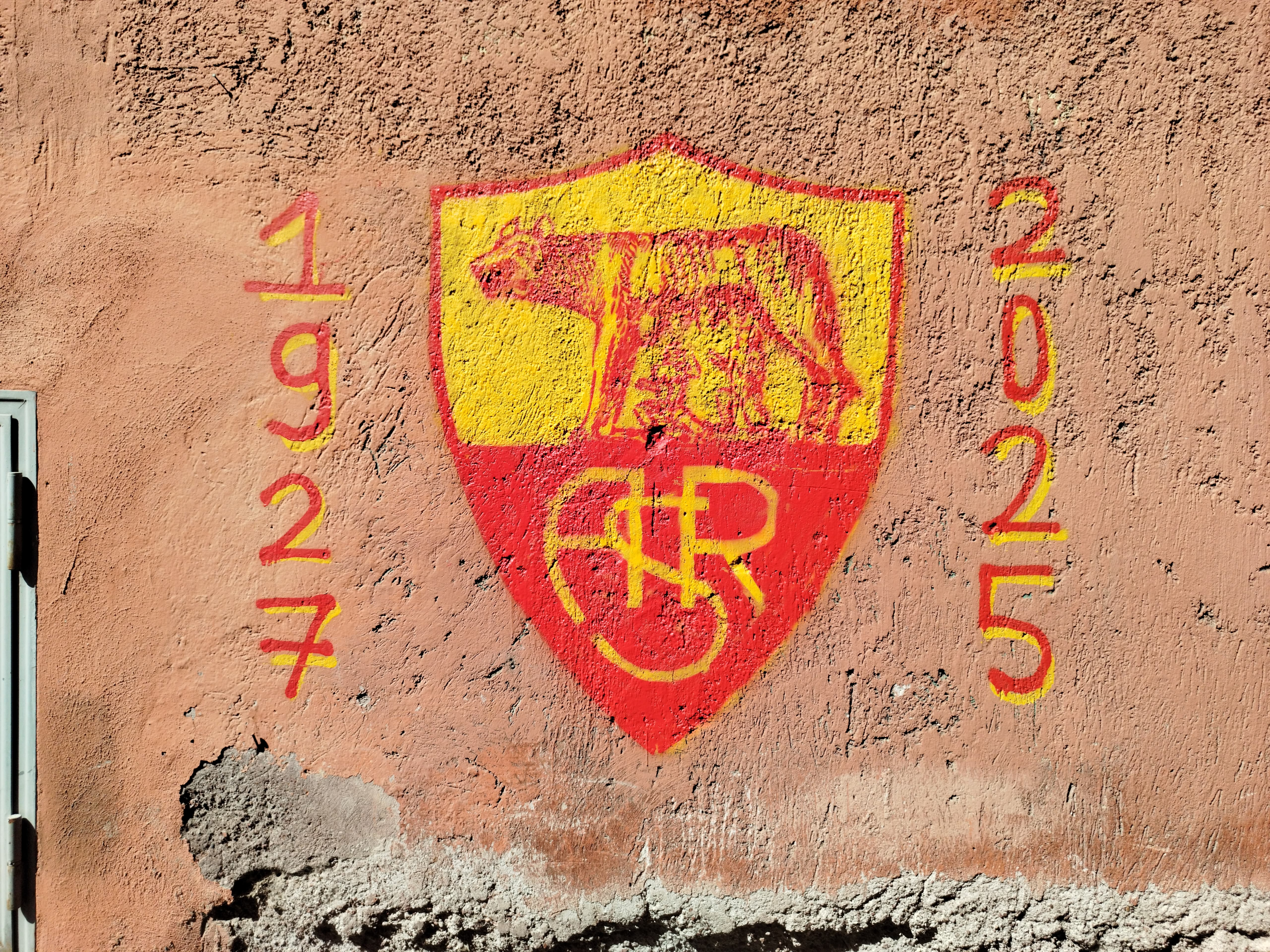
Mural in Rome in honor of Roma's 98th anniversary

AS Roma was founded in the spring of 1927 when Italo Foschi initiated the merger of three older Italian Football Championship clubs from the city of Rome: Roman FC, SS Alba-Audace and Fortitudo-Pro Roma SGS. Foschi was an important Roman representative of the ruling National Fascist Party.

The purpose of the merger was to give the Italian capital a strong club to rival that of the more dominant Northern Italian clubs of the time. The only major Roman club to resist the merger was Lazio because of the intervention of the army General Vaccaro, a member of the club and executive of Italian Football Federation (FIGC). All three founding clubs were relegated, but the fascist-aligned FIGC bet over the capacity of the new team to give a stronger representation to the capital of Italy, and they were awarded a wild card for the Divisione Nazionale, the Serie A forerunner. The club played its earliest seasons at the Motovelodromo Appio stadium, before settling in the working-class streets of Testaccio, where it built an all-wooden ground Campo Testaccio; which was opened on November 3, 1929. An early season in which Roma made a large mark was the 1930–31 championship, where the club finished as runners-up behind Juventus. Captain Attilio Ferraris, along with Guido Masetti, Fulvio Bernardini and Rodolfo Volk, were highly important players during this period.

=== First title victory and decline ===
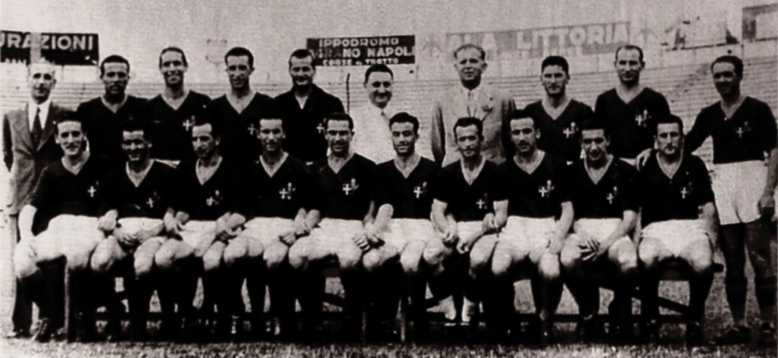
The Roma of the first scudetto in 1942

After a slump in league form and the departure of high key players, Roma eventually rebuilt their squad, adding goalscorers such as the Argentine Enrique Guaita. Under the management of Luigi Barbesino, the Roman club came close to their first title in 1935–36, finishing just one point behind champions Bologna.

Roma returned to form after being inconsistent for much of the late 1930s. Roma recorded an unexpected title triumph in the 1941–42 season by winning their first scudetto title. The 18 goals scored by local player Amedeo Amadei were essential to the Alfréd Schaffer-coached Roma side winning the title. At the time, Italy was involved in World War II and Roma were playing at the Stadio Nazionale PNF.

In the years just after the war, Roma were unable to recapture their league stature from the early 1940s. Roma finished in the lower half of Serie A for five seasons in a row, before eventually succumbing to their only ever relegation to Serie B at the end of the 1950–51 season, around a decade after their championship victory. Under future Italy national team manager Giuseppe Viani, promotion straight back up was achieved.

After returning to the Serie A, Roma managed to stabilise themselves as a top-half club again with players such as Egisto Pandolfini, Dino da Costa and Dane Helge Bronée. Their best finish of this period was under the management of Englishman Jesse Carver, when in 1954–55, they finished as runners-up after Udinese, who originally finished second, were relegated for corruption. Although Roma were unable to break into the top four during the following decade, they did achieve some measure of cup success. Their first honour outside of Italy was recorded in 1960–61 when Roma won the Inter-Cities Fairs Cup by defeating Birmingham City 4–2 in the finals. A few years later, Roma won their first Coppa Italia trophy in 1963–64 after defeating Torino 1–0.

Their lowest point came during the 1964–65 season, when manager Juan Carlos Lorenzo announced the club could not pay its players and was unlikely to be able to afford to travel to Vicenza to fulfil its next fixture. Supporters kept the club going with a fundraiser at the Sistine Theatre and bankruptcy was avoided with the election of a new club president Franco Evangelisti.

Their second Coppa Italia trophy was won in 1968–69, when it competed in a small, league-like system. Giacomo Losi set a Roma appearance record in 1969 with 450 appearances in all competitions, a record that would last 38 years.

=== Time of mixed fortunes from the 1970s to the 1990s ===
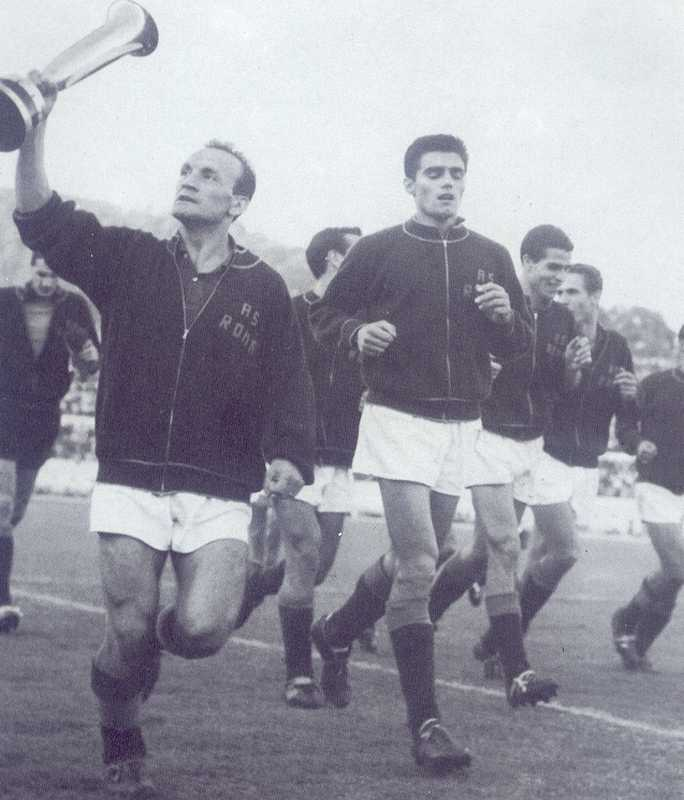
Club captain Giacomo Losi with the Inter-Cities Fairs Cup in 1960–61

Roma were able to add another cup to their collection in 1972, with a 3–1 victory over Blackpool in the Anglo-Italian Cup. During much of the 1970s, Roma's appearance in the top half of Serie A was sporadic. The best place the club were able to achieve during the decade was third in 1974–75. Notable players who turned out for the club during this period included midfielders Giancarlo De Sisti and Francesco Rocca.

The dawning of a newly successful era in Roma's footballing history was brought in with another Coppa Italia victory; they defeated Torino on penalties to win the 1979–80 edition. Roma would reach heights in the league which they had not touched since the 1940s by narrowly and controversially finishing as runners-up to Juventus in 1980–81. Former Milan player Nils Liedholm was the manager at the time, with players such as Bruno Conti, Agostino Di Bartolomei, Roberto Pruzzo and Falcão.

The second scudetto did not elude Roma for much longer. In 1982–83, the Roman club won the title for the first time in 41 years, amidst celebrations in the capital. The following season, Roma finished as runners-up in Italy and collected a Coppa Italia title; they also finished as runners-up in the European Cup final of 1984. The European Cup final with Liverpool ended in a 1–1 draw with a goal from Pruzzo, but Roma eventually lost in the penalty shoot-out. Roma's successful run in the 1980s would finish with a runners-up spot in 1985–86 and a Coppa Italia victory, beating out Sampdoria 3–2.

After, a comparative decline began in the league, one of the few league highs from the following period being a third-place finish in 1987–88. At the start of the 1990s, the club was involved in an all-Italian UEFA Cup final, where they lost 2–1 to Internazionale in 1991. The same season, the club won its seventh Coppa Italia and ended runners-up to Sampdoria in the Supercoppa Italiana. Aside from finishing runners-up to Torino in a Coppa Italia final, the rest of the decade was largely sub-par in the history of Roma, particularly in the league, where the highest they could manage was fourth in 1997–98. The early 1990s also saw the emergence of homegrown striker Francesco Totti, who would go on to be an important member of the team and the club's iconic captain.

=== Third scudetto in the Sensi era ===
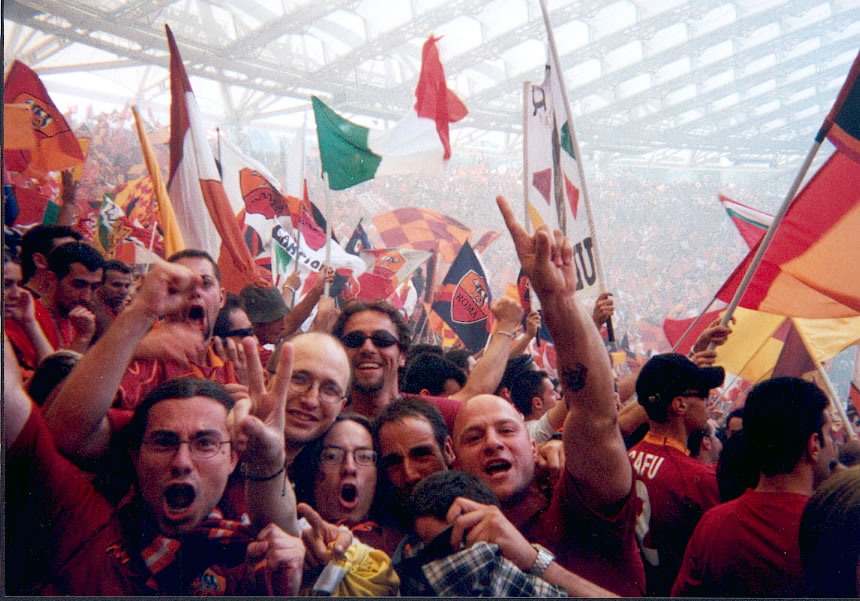
17 June 2001 – Roma-Parma 3–1: Roma won their third Italian championship in its history. Fans of the Curva Sud are overjoyed.

Roma won their third Serie A title in 2000–01. The Scudetto was won on the last day of the season after defeating Parma 3–1, edging Juventus by two points. The club's captain, Francesco Totti, was a large reason for the title victory and he would become one of the main heroes in the club's history, going on to break several club records. Other important players during this period included: Aldair, Cafu, Gabriel Batistuta and Vincenzo Montella.

In the 2001–02 Serie A, Roma ended as runners-up to Juventus by one point. This would be the start of Roma finishing as runners-up several times in both Serie A and Coppa Italia during the 2000s – they lost out 4–2 to Milan in the Coppa Italia final of 2003 and lost to Milan again by finishing second in Serie A for the 2003–04 season. The club also re-capitalized several time in 2003–04 season. In November 2003, €37.5 million was injected by "Roma 2000" to cover the half-year loss and loss carried from previous year. and again on 30 June for €44.57 million. Through stock market, a further €19.850 million of new shares issued, and at the year end, the share capital was €19.878 million, which was unchanged as of 2011. The following season also saw the departure of Walter Samuel for €25 million and Emerson for €28 million, which decreased the strength of the squad. The Giallorossi finished in eighth place, one of the worst of recent seasons.

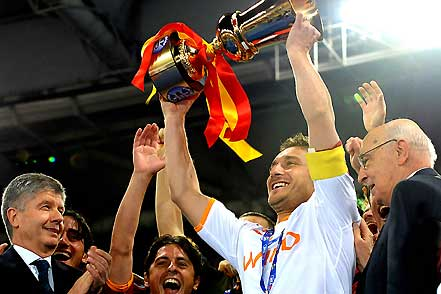
Francesco Totti, with the 2007–08 Coppa Italia

On 9 July 2006, Roma's Francesco Totti, Daniele De Rossi and Simone Perrotta were part of the Italy national team which defeated France in the 2006 FIFA World Cup Final. In the Calciopoli scandal of 2006, Roma were not one of the teams involved. After punishments were issued, Roma was re-classified as runners-up for 2005–06, the same season they finished second in the Coppa Italia losing to Internazionale. In the two following seasons, 2006–07 and 2007–08, Roma finished as Serie A runners-up, meaning that in the 2000s, Roma finished in the top two positions more than any other decade in their history. Meanwhile, in the UEFA Champions League during both of these seasons, they reached the quarter-finals before going out to Manchester United. In the 2008–09 Champions League, Roma reached the knockout stage ahead of Chelsea in their group, thus finishing for the first time in their history as winners of the group stage. However, they lost to Arsenal in the knockout stage on penalty kicks.

After a disappointing start to the 2009–10 season, Claudio Ranieri replaced Luciano Spalletti as head coach. At the time of the switch, Roma lay bottom of the Serie A table after losses to Juventus and Genoa. Despite this setback, Roma went on unbeaten streak of 24 matches in the league – with the last of the 24 being a 2–1 win over rivals Lazio, whereby they came from 1–0 down at half-time to defeat their city rivals after Ranieri substituted both Totti and De Rossi at the interval. The Giallorossi were on top of the table at one point, before a loss to Sampdoria later in the season. Roma would finish runners-up to Internazionale yet again in both Serie A and the Coppa Italia. During the 2000s, Roma had finally recaptured the Scudetto, two Coppa Italia trophies, and their first two Supercoppa Italiana titles. Other notable contributions to the club's history have included a return to the Champions League quarter-finals (in the 2006–07 and 2007–08 editions) since 1984, six runners up positions in the league, four Coppa Italia finals and three Supercoppa finals – marking Roma's greatest ever decade.

=== American ownership and Pallotta era ===
In the summer of 2010, the Sensi family agreed to relinquish their control of Roma as part of a debt-settlement agreement, ending their reign that had begun in 1993. Until a new owner was appointed, Rosella Sensi continued her directorial role of the club. Following a series of poor results that saw Roma engage in a winless streak of five consecutive matches, Claudio Ranieri resigned as head coach in February 2011, and former striker Vincenzo Montella was appointed as caretaker manager until the end of the season. It was also during this season that Roma icon Francesco Totti scored his 200th Serie A goal against Fiorentina in March 2011, becoming only the sixth player to achieve such a feat.

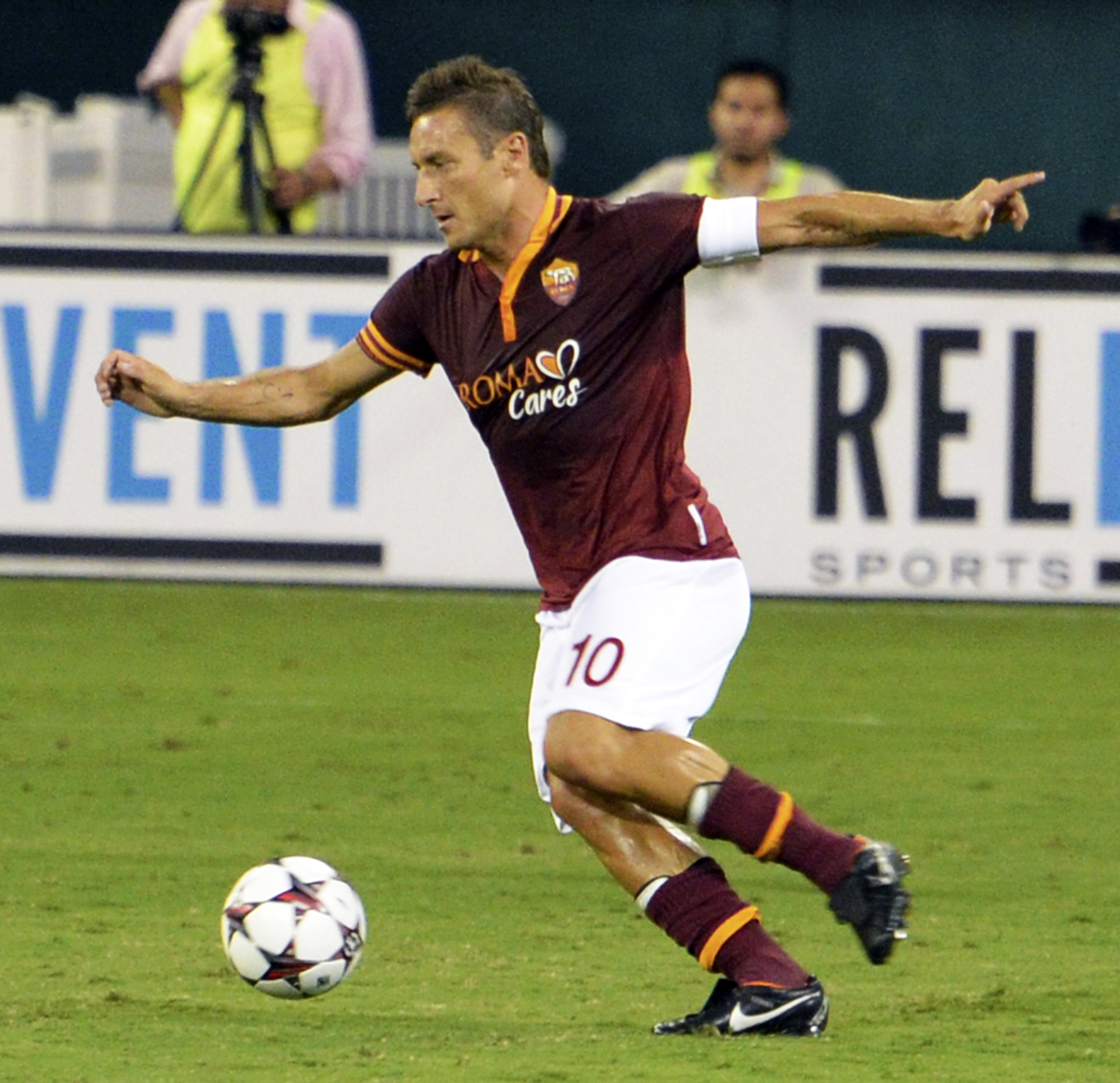
Francesco Totti, the top goalscorer and the player with the most appearances player in Roma's history

On 16 April 2011, the takeover contract was closed with an American investment group led by Thomas R. DiBenedetto, with James Pallotta, Michael Ruane and Richard D'Amore as partners. DiBenedetto became the 22nd president of the club, serving from 27 September 2011 to 27 August 2012 and was succeeded by Pallotta. The new intermediate holding company, NEEP Roma Holding, was 60% owned by American's "AS Roma SPV, LLC" and the rest (40%) was retained by the creditor of Sensi, UniCredit. In turn, NEEP owned all shares held previously by Sensi (about 67%) with the rest free float in the stock market. UniCredit later disinvested NEEP Roma Holding to sell to "AS Roma SPV, LLC" and Pallotta.

The new ownership hired Walter Sabatini as director of football and former Spanish international and Barcelona B coach Luis Enrique as manager. Signings included attacking midfielder Erik Lamela from River Plate and forward Bojan from Barcelona, as well as Dani Osvaldo and Miralem Pjanić. On the pitch, the team were eliminated from 2011–12 UEFA Europa League play-off round by Slovan Bratislava. In 2012, Pallotta became the new president. The 2012–13 pre-season started with the hiring of former manager Zdeněk Zeman. He was sacked on 2 February 2013, while the team ended up in sixth place in Serie A, and lost 1–0 to rivals Lazio in the Coppa Italia final. It was the first time that Lazio and Roma clashed in the Coppa Italia final. As a result, Roma missed out on European competition for the second-straight season.

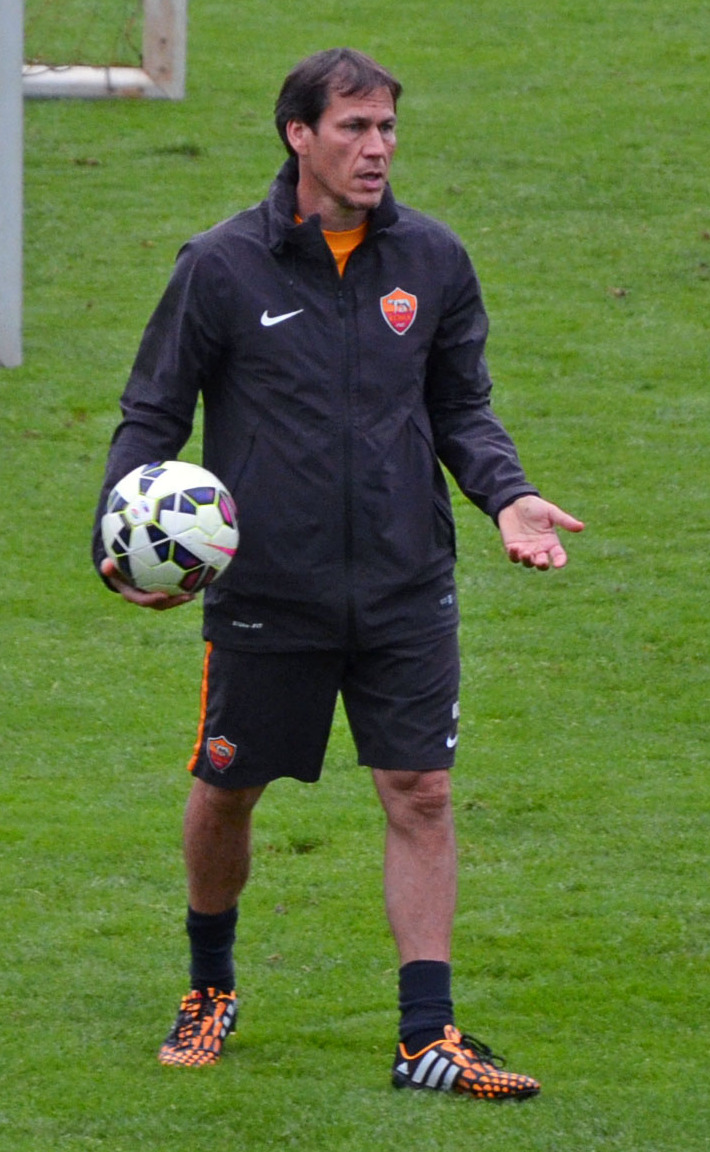
Rudi Garcia coaching Roma in 2014

On 12 June 2013, Rudi Garcia was appointed the new manager of Roma. He won his first ten matches (an all-time Serie A record) including a 2–0 derby win against Lazio, a 3–0 victory away to Internazionale and a 2–0 home win over title rivals Napoli. During this run, Roma scored 24 times while conceding just once, away to Parma. The club earned 85 points and finished second to Juventus, who won the league with a record-breaking 102 points. In 2014–15, Roma finished second behind Juventus for the second consecutive season after a poor run of form in 2015. At the end of season, the club was sanctioned for loss making and breaking UEFA Financial Fair Play Regulations, being punished with a fine of up to €6 million and a limited squad for UEFA competitions.

Ahead of the 2015–16 season, Roma acquired Bosnia international, Edin Džeko, from Manchester City on a €4 million loan with an €11 million option to buy clause, which was activated. On 13 January 2016, Garcia was sacked after a run of one win in seven Serie A matches. Luciano Spalletti was subsequently appointed manager of Roma for his second spell. On 21 February, Totti publicly criticised Spalletti due to his own lack of playing-time since returning from injury. Consequently, Totti was subsequently dropped by Spalletti for Roma's 5–0 win over Palermo, with the decision causing an uproar among the fans and in the media. After their initial disagreements, Spalletti began to use Totti as an immediate impact substitute, and he contributed with four goals and one assist after coming off the bench in five consecutive Serie A matches. Spalletti was able to lead Roma from a mid-table spot to a third-place finish in Serie A, clinching the UEFA Champions League play-off spot.

During the summer of 2016, Roma lost midfielder Miralem Pjanić to rivals Juventus to improve its financial position. On 27 April 2017, Roma appointed sporting director Monchi, formerly of Sevilla FC. On 28 May that year, on the last day of the 2016–17 season, Totti made his 786th and final appearance for Roma before retiring in a 3–2 home win against Genoa, coming on as a substitute for Mohamed Salah in the 54th minute and received a standing ovation from the fans. The win saw Roma finish second in Serie A behind Juventus. Daniele De Rossi succeeded Totti as club captain and signed a new two-year contract.

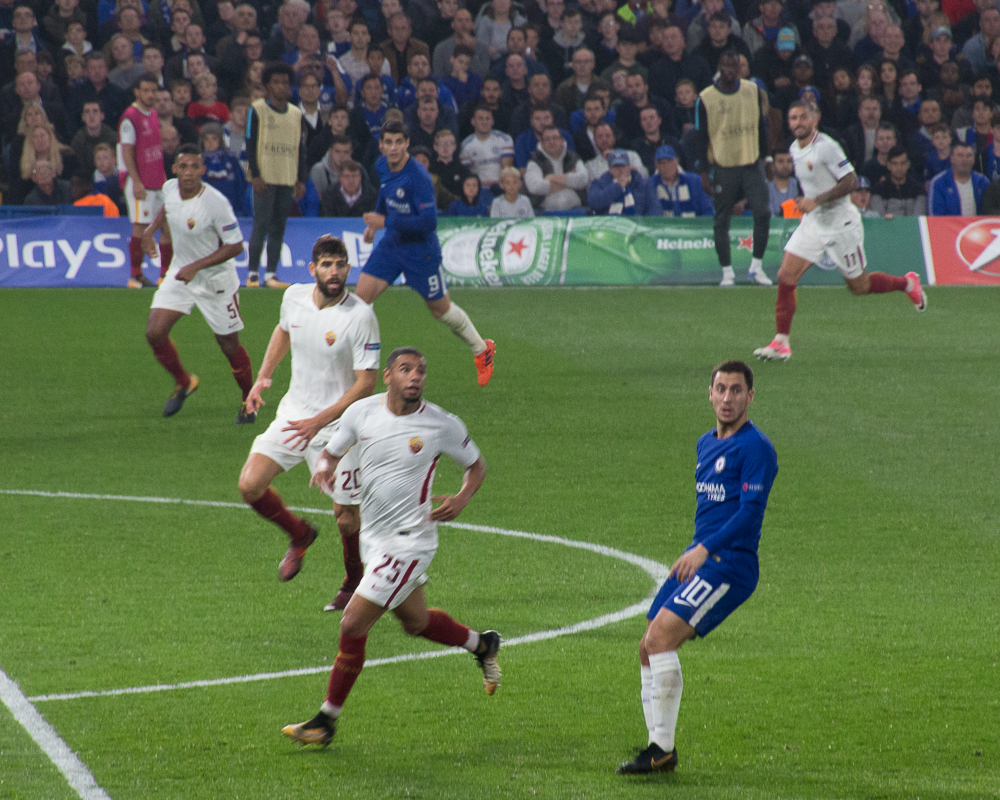
The 2017–18 Roma playing in the UEFA Champions League group stage match against Chelsea

On 13 June 2017, former Roma player Eusebio Di Francesco was appointed as the club's new manager, replacing Spalletti, who had left for Internazionale. Roma again lost a key player during the summer transfer window, with Mohamed Salah joining Liverpool F.C. for a fee of €39 million (£34m). Several new players joined the club, including a club-record deal of up to €40 million for Sampdoria striker Patrik Schick. In the 2017–18 UEFA Champions League Roma were drawn against FC Barcelona in the quarter-finals, being defeated 4–1 away in the first leg but winning 3–0 in the second to advance on away goals to the semi-finals for the first time since 1984. Roma then lost to Liverpool, the team that had defeated them in the 1984 European Cup Final 7–6 on aggregate. Roma ended the 2017–18 season in 3rd place on 77 points, qualifying for the following season's Champions League.

In the summer of 2018, Roma were busy in the transfer market, in large parts thanks to the €83 million they received from reaching the Champions League semi-finals, as well as selling goalkeeper Alisson for a world record €72 million including bonuses to Liverpool. Roma spent €150 million to sign the likes of Shick, Nzonzi, Pastore, Kluivert, Defrel and more, while selling their two starting midfielders from the previous season, Nainggolan and Strootman. The 2018–19 season saw the club eliminated against Porto 4–3 on aggregate in the Champions League round of 16; Di Francesco was sacked and replaced by Claudio Ranieri who served as caretaker manager. The following day, sporting director Monchi stepped down due to disagreements with Pallotta; the club president disputed his account In Monchi's two years at the club, he spent £208 million on 21 signings, while when he left, 12 of his signings remained at the club. Under Ranieri, Roma failed to qualify for the Champions League, finishing 6th.

=== Friedkin era and European success ===
In December 2019, AS Roma SPV LLC was in final negotiations to sell the team for $872 million, to American businessman Dan Friedkin, however negotiations stalled during the COVID-19 pandemic. On 6 August 2020, Friedkin signed the preliminary contract to agree to pay $591 million to Pallotta, the main shareholder of Roma.

Paulo Fonseca, who was hired as manager in 2019, left two years later and was replaced by fellow Portuguese José Mourinho. On 25 May 2022, he led Roma to win the inaugural edition of UEFA Europa Conference League, defeating Feyenoord in the final. In September 2024 it was reported that club owners are interested in purchasing the Premier League club of Everton. Club owners claim, it will not effect Roma.

In July 2025, Roma's majority owners, The Friedkin Group, launched Pursuit Sports, a dedicated multi-club management vehicle to oversee their football properties, including Roma and Everton. Pursuit Sports is led by CEO Dave Beeston and is intended to provide strategic, data-driven support across the clubs while maintaining their individual identities.

== Club identity ==
Roma's colours of carmine red with a golden yellow trim represents the traditional colours of Rome, the official seal of the Comune di Roma features the same colours. The gold and the purple-red represent Roman imperial dignity. White shorts and black socks are usually worn with the red shirt. However, in particularly high key matches, the shorts and socks are the same colour as the home shirt.

The kit itself was originally worn by Roman Football Club; one of the three clubs who merged to form the current incarnation in 1927. Because of the colours they wear, Roma are often nicknamed i giallorossi meaning the yellow-reds. Roma's away kit is traditionally white, with a third kit changing colour from time to time.

A popular nickname for the club is "i lupi" ("the wolves") – the animal has always featured on the club's badge in different forms throughout their history. The emblem of the team is currently the one which was used when the club was first founded. It portrays the female wolf with the two infant brothers Romulus and Remus, illustrating the myth of the founding of Rome, superimposed on a bipartite golden yellow over a maroon red shield. In the myth from which the club takes their nickname and logo, the twins (sons of Mars and Rhea Silvia) are thrown into the river Tiber by their uncle Amulius. A she-wolf then saved the twins and looked after them. Eventually, the two twins took revenge on Amulius before falling out themselves – Romulus killed Remus and was thus made king of a new city named in his honour, Rome.

=== Kit suppliers and shirt sponsors ===
Period	Kit manufacturer	Shirt sponsor (front)	Shirt sponsor (back)	Shirt sponsor (sleeve)
1970–71	Lacoste	None	None	None
1972–76	None	None	None	None
1977–79	Adidas	None	None	None
1979–80	Pouchain	None	None	None
1980–81	Playground	None	None	None
1981–82	Playground	Barilla	None	None
1982–83	Patrick	Barilla	None	None
1983–86	Kappa	Barilla	None	None
1986–91	NR	Barilla	None	None
1991–94	Adidas	Barilla	None	None
1994–95	ASICS	Nuova Tirrena	None	None
1995–97	ASICS	INA Assitalia	None	None
1997–00	Diadora	INA Assitalia	None	None
2000–02	Kappa	INA Assitalia	None	None
2002–03	Kappa	Mazda	None	None
2003–05	Diadora	Mazda	None	None
2005–06	Diadora	Banca Italease	None	None
2006–07	Diadora	None (Note: On Matchday 6 and Matchday 30, Rome Film Festival and Pepsi Collection featured as one-time main sponsors.)	None	None
2007–13	Kappa	Wind	None	None
2013–14	In-house production	Roma Cares	None	None
2014–18	Nike	None	None	None
2018–20	Nike	Qatar Airways	Hyundai	None
2020–21	Nike	Qatar Airways	Hyundai	Iqoniq
2021–22	New Balance	DigitalBits	Hyundai	None
2022–23	New Balance	DigitalBits	Auberge Collection	None
2023–25	Adidas	Riyadh Season	Auberge Collection	None
2025–	Adidas	Eurobet.live	Auberge Collection	Wizz Air

== Facilities ==
=== Stadiums ===
Stadio Olimpico
- Olimpico
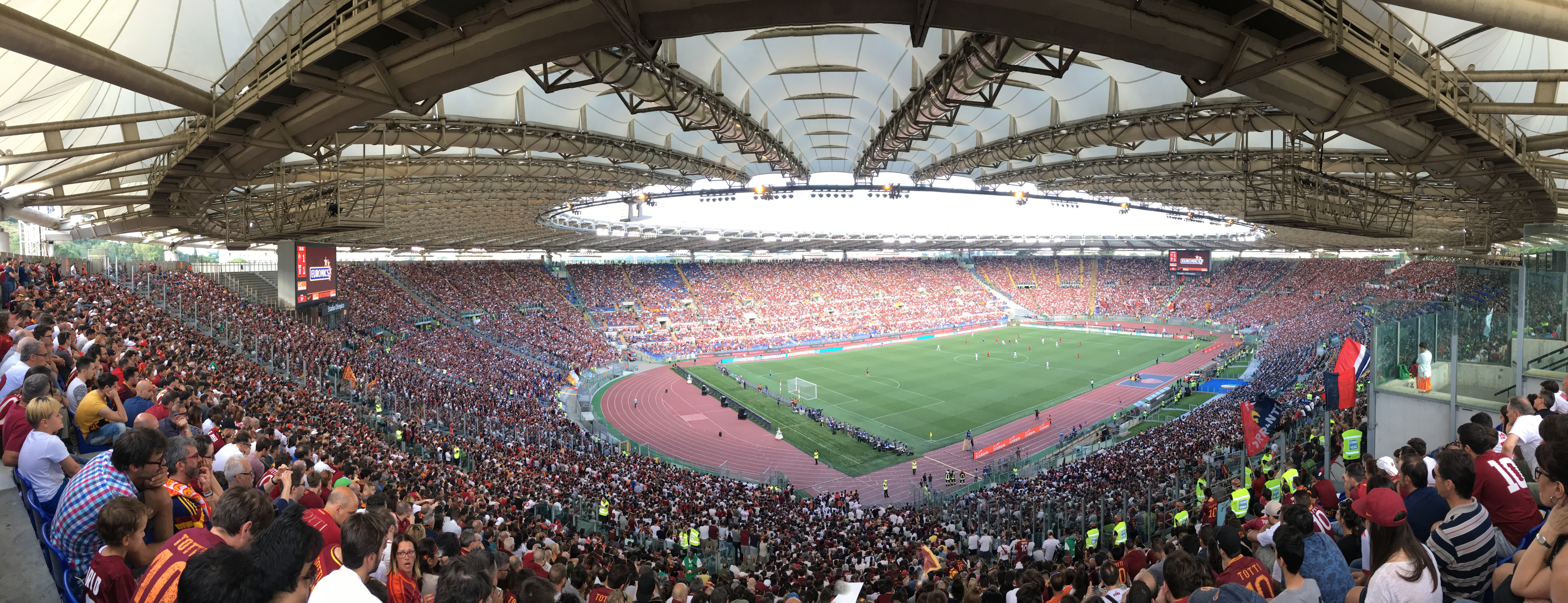
- Location: Viale dello Stadio Olimpico, Foro Italico, Rome, Italy
- Owner: Italian National Olympic Committee
- Operator: A.S. Roma and S.S. Lazio
- Capacity: 70,643 seated

Construction
- Groundbreaking: 1927
- Opened: 1953
- Renovated: 1990
- Architect: Annibale Vitellozzi

Tenants
- A.S. Roma (1953–present), S.S. Lazio (1953–present)

The club's first stadium was the Motovelodromo Appio, previously used by Alba-Audace. Roma only played the 1927–28 season there until they moved to Campo Testaccio. Campo Testaccio was used through 1929 to 1940 until the team then moved to the Stadio Nazionale del PNF, where they spent 13 years. In the 1953–54 season, Roma moved to the Stadio Olimpico, which it shares with Lazio. The stadium has undergone several changes over the years, with the most significant taking place in the 1989–90 season, when the stadium was mostly demolished and reconstructed for the 1990 FIFA World Cup held in Italy. During reconstruction, Roma played its home matches at Stadio Flaminio.

On 30 December 2012, then-club president James Pallotta announced Stadio della Roma, a planned new stadium in the Tor di Valle area of Rome with a capacity of 52,500. Five years later, the Region of Lazio and the mayor of Rome rejected the stadium's construction proposal, before being approved soon following approval of readjustments to the stadium's design. However, in August 2017, the stadium suffered another delay, but that December, the project was again given the go-ahead and was expected to be built by 2020. This plan was completely cancelled by February 2021.

In 2022, the club pivoted to a new site in Pietralata for the New AS Roma Stadium: construction is expected to start between 2025 and 2026 and is expected to conclude by 2028.

==== List of stadiums used by the club ====
- 1927–1928 Motovelodromo Appio
- 1929–1940 Campo Testaccio
- 1940–1953 Stadio Nazionale del PNF
- 1953– Stadio Olimpico (1989–1990 Stadio Flaminio due to renovations on Olimpico)

=== Trigoria ===
A sports centre located in Trigoria at kilometre 3600 in south-east of Rome was purchased on 22 July 1977 by then club president Gaetano Anzalone. It was opened on 23 July 1979 as Anzalone's final act as president. The complex had its first expansion in 1984 when the club was handled by Dino Viola and another in 1998 under the chairmanship of Franco Sensi. The centre's official name is the Fulvio Bernardini di Trigoria, named after club icon Fulvio Bernardini.

On 4 September 2019, the Trigoria training ground began to serve also as a private school named 'Liceo Scientifico Sportivo A.S. Roma' exclusively educating only the team's youth players in a renovated building on the training ground premises. 80 students are currently enrolled in the school which features its own cafeteria and gym.

The centre is also known for hosting the Argentina national team during the 1990 FIFA World Cup, held in Italy.

== Supporters ==
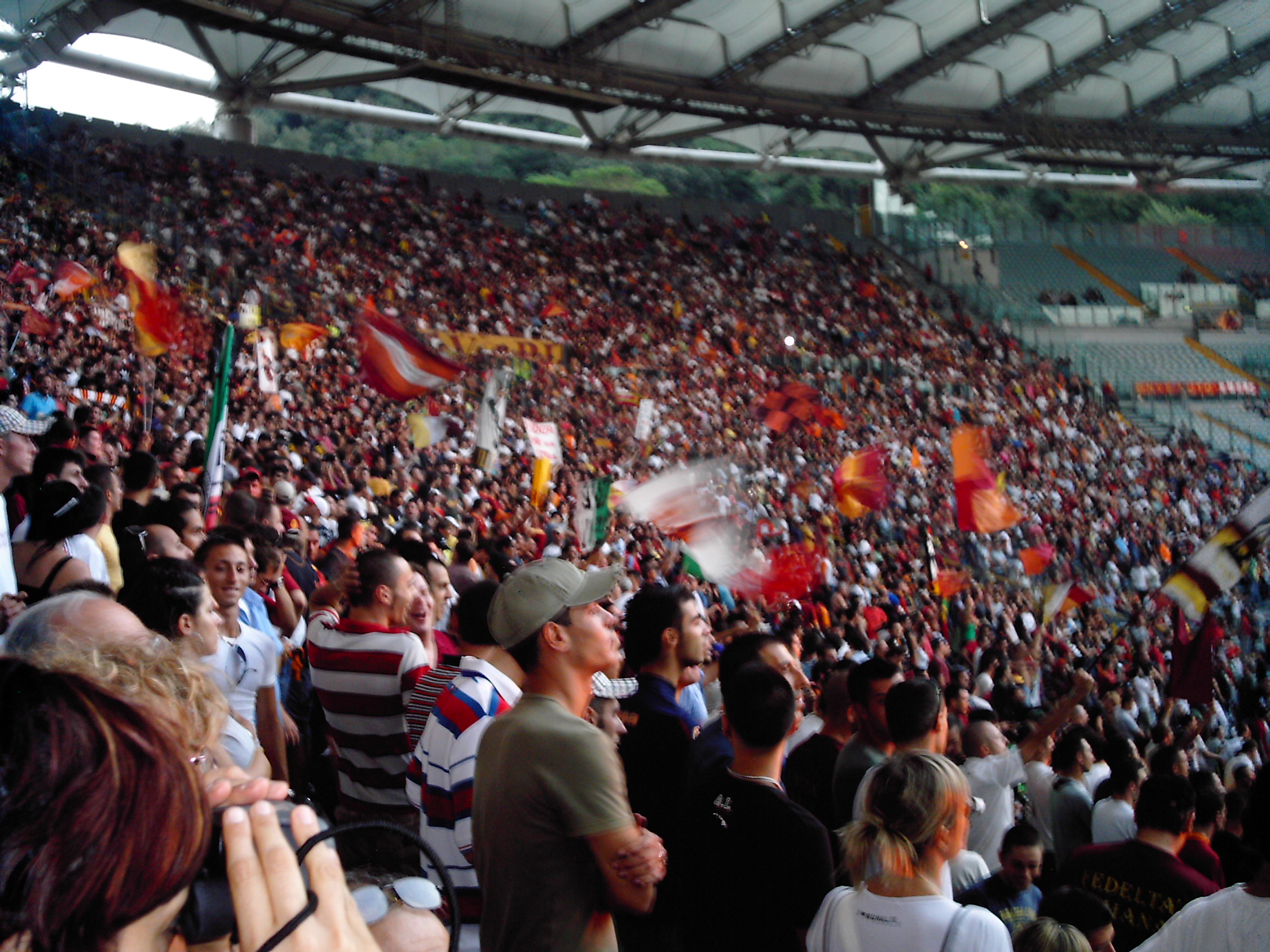
Roma fans at the Stadio Olimpico

Roma is the fifth-most supported football club in Italy – behind Juventus, Internazionale, A.C. Milan and Napoli – with approximately 7% of Italian football fans supporting the club, according to the Doxa Institute-L'Espresso's research of April 2006. Historically, the largest section of Roma supporters in the city of Rome have come from the inner-city, especially Testaccio.

The traditional ultras group of the club was Commando Ultrà Curva Sud commonly abbreviated as CUCS. This group was founded by the merger of many smaller groups and was considered one of the most historic in the history of European football. However, by the mid-1990s, CUCS had been usurped by rival factions and ultimately broke up. Since that time, the Curva Sud of the Stadio Olimpico has been controlled by more right-wing groups, including A.S. Roma Ultras, Boys and Giovinezza, among others. However, the oldest group, Fedayn, is apolitical, and politics is not the main identity of Roma, just a part of their overall identity. Besides ultras groups, it is believed Roma fans support the left as opposed to Lazio supporters, which are notoriously proud of their right-wing affiliation. According to football journalists Richard Hall and Luca Hodges-Ramon, "Roma's hardcore support have traditionally been associated with left-wing politics", though the Boys have a neo-fascist ideology.

In November 2015, Roma's ultras and their Lazio counterparts boycotted Roma's 1–0 victory in the Derby della Capitale in protest at new safety measures imposed at the Stadio Olimpico. The measures – imposed by Rome's prefect, Franco Gabrielli – had involved plastic glass dividing walls being installed in both the Curva Sud and Curva Nord, splitting the sections behind each goal in two. Both sets of ultras continued their protests for the rest of the season, including during Roma's 4–1 victory in the return fixture. Lazio's ultras returned to the Curva Nord for Roma's 1–4 victory in December 2016, but the Roma ultras continue to boycott matches.

Stadio Olimpico during a Roma match

The most known club anthem is "Roma (non-si discute, si ama)", also known as "Roma Roma", by singer Antonello Venditti. The title roughly means, "Roma is not to be questioned, it is to be loved," and it is sung before each match. The song "Grazie Roma", by the same singer, is played at the end of victorious home matches. Recently, the main riff of The White Stripes' song "Seven Nation Army" has also become widely popular at matches.

=== Rivalries ===
In Italian football, Roma is a club with many rivalries; first and foremost is their rivalry with Lazio, the club with whom they share the Stadio Olimpico. The derby between the two is called the Derby della Capitale, it is amongst the most heated and emotional footballing rivalries in the world. The fixture has seen some occasional instances of violence in the past, including the death of Lazio fan Vincenzo Paparelli in 1979–80 as a result of an emergency flare fired from the Curva Sud, and the abandonment of a match in March 2004 following unfounded rumours of a fatality which led to violence outside the stadium.

Against Napoli, Roma also compete in the Derby del Sole, meaning the "Derby of the Sun". Nowadays, fans also consider Juventus (a rivalry born especially in the 1980s), Milan, Atalanta (since 1984, when friendly relations between the two clubs' ultras deteriorated), and Internazionale (increased in recent years) among their rivals, as they are often competitors for the top four spots in the league table and qualification for the UEFA Champions League.

=== Hooliganism ===
Rivalries with other teams have escalated into serious violence. A group of ultras who label themselves the Fedayn — 'the devotees' — after a group of long-forgotten Iranian guerrilla fighters are regarded to be responsible for the organised hooliganism. In 2014 Daniele De Santis, a Roma ultra, was convicted of shooting Ciro Esposito and two others during clashes with Napoli fans who were in Rome for their club's Coppa Italia final against Fiorentina. Esposito died of his wounds. De Santis was sentenced to 26 years in prison, later reduced to 16 years on appeal. Roma ultras have displayed banners celebrating De Santis.

There have been multiple instances of Roma ultras attacking supporters of foreign clubs when playing in Rome. These attacks have regularly featured the Roma ultras using knives, poles, flares, bottles and stones on unarmed foreign supporters, resulting in multiple hospitalisations. Home games against Liverpool in 1984 and 2001, Middlesbrough in 2006, Manchester United in 2007, Arsenal in 2009, Tottenham Hotspur in 2012, and Chelsea in 2017 have all resulted in multiple stabbings and other injuries to foreign supporters. In 2018 Roma ultras travelling to an away game at Liverpool attacked home supporters, resulting in a home supporter being critically injured.

== Players ==
=== Current squad ===
As of 13 October 2026

Note: Flags indicate national team as defined under FIFA eligibility rules; some limited exceptions apply. Players may hold more than one non-FIFA nationality.

No.	Pos.	Nation	Player
2	DF	NED	Devyne Rensch
3	DF	GRE	Konstantinos Koulierakis
4	MF	ITA	Bryan Cristante (captain)
5	DF	CIV	Evan Ndicka
7	MF	ITA	Lorenzo Pellegrini (vice-captain)
9	FW	ARG	Santiago Castro
14	FW	NED	Donyell Malen
15	MF	NED	Marten de Roon
17	MF	FRA	Manu Koné
18	FW	ARG	Matías Soulé
20	DF	ARG	Nahuel Molina
21	FW	ARG	Paulo Dybala
22	DF	ESP	Mario Hermoso

No.	Pos.	Nation	Player
23	DF	ITA	Gianluca Mancini (3rd captain)
26	DF	ARG	Leonardo Balerdi (on loan from Marseille)
32	GK	COL	Devis Vásquez
43	DF	BRA	Wesley
61	MF	ITA	Niccolò Pisilli
68	FW	ITA	Antonio Arena
70	GK	USA	Giorgio De Marzi
77	DF	ITA	Emanuele Lulli
86	MF	POR	Rodrigo Mora
87	DF	ITA	Daniele Ghilardi
95	GK	ITA	Pierluigi Gollini
99	GK	SRB	Mile Svilar

=== Roma Primavera ===
Note: Flags indicate national team as defined under FIFA eligibility rules; some limited exceptions apply. Players may hold more than one non-FIFA nationality.

No.	Pos.	Nation	Player
12	GK	HUN	Levente Kilvinger
63	MF	ITA	Alessandro Di Nunzio
64	MF	ITA	Valerio Maccaroni

No.	Pos.	Nation	Player
72	FW	ITA	Lorenzo Paratici (on loan from Sampdoria)
78	FW	GUI	Mandjou Camara

=== Out on loan ===
Note: Flags indicate national team as defined under FIFA eligibility rules; some limited exceptions apply. Players may hold more than one non-FIFA nationality.

No.	Pos.	Nation	Player
—	GK	POL	Radosław Żelezny (at Perugia until 30 June 2027)
—	DF	ESP	Angeliño (at Deportivo A Coruña until 30 June 2027)
—	DF	ALB	Marash Kumbulla (at Rayo Vallecano until 30 June 2027)
—	DF	ITA	Marco Litti (at Lecco until 30 June 2027)
—	DF	ITA	Mattia Mannini (at Benevento until 30 June 2027)
—	DF	ITA	Federico Nardin (at Pescara until 30 June 2027)
—	DF	ITA	Filippo Reale (at Carrarese until 30 June 2027)
—	DF	MAR	Anass Salah-Eddine (at Panathinaikos until 30 June 2027)

No.	Pos.	Nation	Player
—	DF	SEN	Mohamed Seck (at Foggia until 30 June 2027)
—	DF	POL	Jan Ziółkowski (at Monza until 30 June 2027)
—	MF	MAR	Neil El Aynaoui (at RB Leipzig until 30 June 2027)
—	MF	ITA	Alessandro Romano (at Cagliari until 30 June 2027)
—	FW	ITA	Tommaso Baldanzi (at Genoa until 30 June 2027)
—	FW	ITA	Luigi Cherubini (at Benevento until 30 June 2027)
—	FW	UKR	Artem Dovbyk (at Bologna until 30 June 2027)
—	FW	FRA	Robinio Vaz (at Hull City until 30 June 2027)

== Management staff ==
Position	Staff
President	(United States) Dan Friedkin
Vice president	(United States) Ryan Friedkin
Chief executive officer	(United States) John Galantic
Sporting director	(Italy) Tony D'Amico
Director of development	
Team manager	(Italy) Vincenzo Todaro
Academy director	(Venezuela) Massimo Margiotta
Head coach	(Italy) Gian Piero Gasperini
Assistant coach	(Italy) Tullio Gritti
Goalkeeping coach	(Italy) Simone Farelli (Italy) Luigi Salineri
Technical coach	(Italy) Mauro Fumagalli
Athletic coach	(Italy) Domenico Borelli (Italy) Gabriele Boccolini (Italy) Massimo Catalano (Italy) Alessandro Pilati
Match analyst	(Italy) Simone Beccaccioli
Head of scouting	(Italy) Andrea Iore
Scout	(Portugal) José Fontes (Spain) Peyo Doménech
Chief medical officer	(Italy) Andrea Billi
Doctor	(Italy) Emiliano Coletta
Physiotherapist	(Spain) Guilermo Aladrén Pérez (Italy) Claudio Patti
Podiatrist	(Italy) Raniero Russo
Osteopath	(Italy) Walter Martinelli
Nutrionist	(Italy) Guido Rillo
Secretary	(Italy) Marco Robino Rizzet
Referee caretaker	(Italy) Vito Scala

Last updated: 29 July 2026.

== Notable players ==
Among the most iconic Roma players throughout its history are Attilio Ferraris IV, the club's first captain; Fulvio Bernardini and Guido Masetti, key figures in the 1942 Scudetto win; and Amedeo Amadei, who still holds the record as the youngest Serie A goalscorer. The 1950s and 1960s saw stars like Giacomo Losi, Dino da Costa (top scorer in the Rome derby), and Pedro Manfredini. In the 1980s, Agostino Di Bartolomei, Bruno Conti, Roberto Pruzzo, and the Brazilian midfielder Falcão were central to Roma's second league title and European success. Later decades featured fan favorites such as Rudi Völler, Giuseppe Giannini, Aldair, Cafu, and Roman-born legends Francesco Totti and Daniele De Rossi.

=== Captains ===
Name	Years
(Italy) Attilio Ferraris IV	1927–1929
(Italy) Fulvio Bernardini	1929–1939
(Italy) Guido Masetti	1939–1943
(Italy) Amedeo Amadei	1943–1948
(Italy) Sergio Andreoli	1948–1950
(Italy) Armando Tre Re	1950–1953
(Italy) Arcadio Venturi	1953–1957
(Italy) Luigi Giuliano	1957
(Uruguay) Alcides Ghiggia	1957–1958
(Italy) Egidio Guarnacci	1958–1959

Name	Years
(Italy) Giacomo Losi	1959–1968
(Spain) Joaquín Peiró	1968–1970
(Spain) Luis del Sol	1970–1972
(Italy) Franco Cordova	1972–1976
(Italy) Sergio Santarini	1976–1980
(Italy) Agostino Di Bartolomei	1980–1984
(Italy) Carlo Ancelotti	1984–1987
(Italy) Giuseppe Giannini	1987–1996
(Italy) Amedeo Carboni	1996–1997
(Argentina) Abel Balbo	1997–1998

Name	Years
(Brazil) Aldair	1998
(Italy) Francesco Totti	1998–2017
(Italy) Daniele De Rossi	2017–2019
(Italy) Alessandro Florenzi	2019–2020
(Bosnia and Herzegovina) Edin Džeko	2020–2021
(Italy) Lorenzo Pellegrini	2021–2025
(Italy) Stephan El Shaarawy	2025
(Italy) Bryan Cristante	2025–

=== Retired numbers ===
Since 2017, Roma has not issued the squad number 10 to commemorate Francesco Totti after his retirement. It was offered to Paulo Dybala in 2022, but Dybala chose the number 21 instead.

Note: Flags indicate national team as defined under FIFA eligibility rules; some limited exceptions apply. Players may hold more than one non-FIFA nationality.

No.	Pos.	Nation	Player
10	FW	ITA	Francesco Totti (1993–2017)

=== Hall of Fame ===
On 7 October 2012, the AS Roma Hall of Fame was announced. The Hall of Fame players were voted via the club's official website and a special Hall of Fame panel. In 2013 four players were voted in. In 2014, the third year of AS Roma Hall of Fame four more players were voted in.

Added in 2012:

- (Italy) Franco Tancredi (1977–1990)
- (Brazil) Cafu (1997–2003)
- (Italy) Giacomo Losi (1954–1969)
- (Brazil) Aldair (1990–2003)
- (Italy) Francesco Rocca (1972–1981)
- (Italy) Fulvio Bernardini (1928–1939)
- (Italy) Agostino Di Bartolomei (1972–1975; 1976–1984)
- (Brazil) Falcão (1980–1985)
- (Italy) Bruno Conti (1973–1975; 1976–1978; 1979–1991)
- (Italy) Roberto Pruzzo (1978–1988)
- (Italy) Amedeo Amadei (1936–1938; 1939–1948)

Added in 2013:

- (Italy) Attilio Ferraris (1927–1934; 1938–1939)
- (Italy) Sebastiano Nela (1981–1992)
- (Italy) Giuseppe Giannini (1981–1996)
- (Italy) Vincenzo Montella (1999–2009)

Added in 2014:

- (Uruguay) Alcides Ghiggia (1953–1961)
- (Italy) Carlo Ancelotti (1979–1987)
- (Germany) Rudi Völler (1987–1992)
- (France) Vincent Candela (1997–2005)

Added in 2015:

- (Italy) Guido Masetti (1930–1943)
- (Italy) Sergio Santarini (1968–1981)
- (Italy) Damiano Tommasi (1996–2006)
- (Argentina) Gabriel Batistuta (2000–2003)

Added in 2016:

- (Italy) Giorgio Carpi (1927–1937)
- (Brazil) Toninho Cerezo (1983–1986)
- (Italy) Giancarlo De Sisti (1960–1965; 1974–1979)
- (Italy) Arcadio Venturi (1948–1957)

Added in 2017:

- (Italy) Francesco Totti (1992–2017)

Added in 2018:

- (Italy) Mario De Micheli (1927–1932)
- (Italy) Giuliano Taccola (1967–1969)
- (Italy) Rodolfo Volk (1928–1933)

== Chairmen history ==
Roma have had numerous chairmen (Italian: presidenti, lit. 'presidents' or Italian: presidenti del consiglio di amministrazione, lit. 'chairmen of the board of directors') over the course of their history, some of which have been the owners and co-owners of the club, some of them were nominated by the owners. Franco Sensi was the chairman until his death in 2008, with his daughter, Roma CEO Rosella Sensi taking his place as chairman. Here is a complete list of Roma chairmen from 1927 until the present day.

Name	Years
Italo Foschi	1927–1928
Renato Sacerdoti	1928–1935
Vittorio Scialoja	1935–1936
Igino Betti	1936–1941
Edgardo Bazzini	1941–1944
Pietro Baldassarre	1944–1949
Pier Carlo Restagno	1949–1952
Romolo Vaselli	1952
Renato Sacerdoti	1952–1958
Anacleto Gianni	1958–1962
Francesco Marini-Dettina	1962–1965
Franco Evangelisti	1965–1968
Francesco Ranucci	1968–1969

Name	Years
Alvaro Marchini	1969–1971
Gaetano Anzalone	1971–1979
Dino Viola	1979–1991
Flora Viola	1991
Giuseppe Ciarrapico	1991–1993
Ciro Di Martino	1993
Franco Sensi	1993–2008
Rosella Sensi	2008–2011
Roberto Cappelli	2011
Thomas R. DiBenedetto	2011–2012
James Pallotta	2012–2020
Dan Friedkin	2020–present

== Managerial history ==
Roma have had many managers and trainers running the team during their history, here is a chronological list of them from 1927 onwards.

Manager	Years
(England) William Garbutt	1927–29
(Italy) Guido Baccani	1929–30
(England) Herbert Burgess	1930–32
(Hungary) Lászlo Barr	1932–33
(Hungary) Lajos Kovács	1933–34
(Italy) Luigi Barbesino	1934–38
(Italy) Guido Ara	1938–39
(Hungary) Alfréd Schaffer	1939–42
(Hungary) Géza Kertész	1942–43
(Italy) Guido Masetti	1943–45
(Italy) Giovanni Degni	1945–47
(Hungary) Imre Senkey	1947–48
(Italy) Luigi Brunella	1948–49
(Italy) Fulvio Bernardini	1949–50
(Italy) Adolfo Baloncieri	1950
(Italy) Pietro Serantoni	1950
(Italy) Guido Masetti	1950–51
(Italy) Giuseppe Viani	1951–53
(Italy) Mario Varglien	1953–54
(England) Jesse Carver	1954–56
(Hungary) György Sárosi	1956
(Italy) Guido Masetti	1956–57
(England) Alec Stock	1957–58
(Sweden) Gunnar Nordahl	1958–59
(Italy) György Sarosi	1959–60

Manager	Years
(Italy) Alfredo Foni	1960–61
(Argentina) Luis Carniglia	1961–63
(Albania) Naim Kryeziu	1963
(Italy) Alfredo Foni	1963–64
(Spain) Luis Miró	1964–65
(Argentina) Juan Carlos Lorenzo	1965–66
(Italy) Oronzo Pugliese	1966–68
(Argentina) Helenio Herrera	1968–70
(Italy) Luciano Tessari	1970
(Argentina) Helenio Herrera	1971–72
(Italy) Tonino Trebiciani	1972–73
(Sweden) Nils Liedholm	1974–77
(Italy) Gustavo Giagnoni	1978–79
(Italy) Ferruccio Valcareggi	1979–80
(Sweden) Nils Liedholm	1980–84
(Sweden) Sven-Göran Eriksson	1984–87
(Italy) Angelo Sormani	1987
(Sweden) Nils Liedholm	1987–89
(Italy) Luciano Spinosi	1989
(Italy) Gigi Radice	1989–90
(Italy) Ottavio Bianchi	1990–92
(Federal Republic of Yugoslavia) Vujadin Boškov	1992–93
(Italy) Carlo Mazzone	1993–96
(Argentina) Carlos Bianchi	1996
(Sweden) Nils Liedholm	1996

Manager	Years
(Italy) Ezio Sella	1996
(Czech Republic) Zdeněk Zeman	1997–99
(Italy) Fabio Capello	1999–04
(Italy) Cesare Prandelli	2004
(Germany) Rudi Völler	2004
(Italy) Luigi Delneri	2004–05
(Italy) Bruno Conti	2005
(Italy) Luciano Spalletti	2005–09
(Italy) Claudio Ranieri	2009–11
(Italy) Vincenzo Montella	2011
(Spain) Luis Enrique	2011–12
(Czech Republic) Zdeněk Zeman	2012–13
(Italy) Aurelio Andreazzoli	2013
(France) Rudi Garcia	2013–16
(Italy) Luciano Spalletti	2016–17
(Italy) Eusebio Di Francesco	2017–19
(Italy) Claudio Ranieri	2019
(Portugal) Paulo Fonseca	2019–21
(Portugal) José Mourinho	2021–24
(Italy) Daniele De Rossi	2024
(Croatia) Ivan Jurić	2024
(Italy) Claudio Ranieri	2024–25
(Italy) Gian Piero Gasperini	2025–

== Honours ==
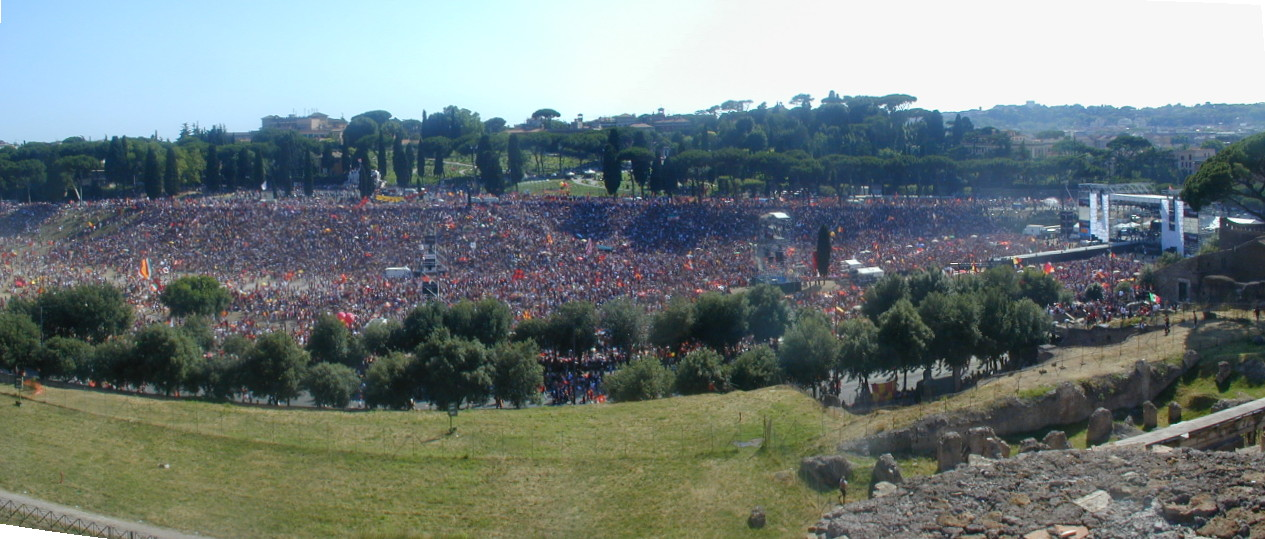
Roma fans celebrating the Scudetto in 2001 at the Circus Maximus

=== National titles ===
- Serie A
  - Winners (3): 1941–42, 1982–83, 2000–01
  - Runners-up: (14): 1930–31, 1935–36, 1980–81, 1983–84, 1985–86, 2001–02, 2003–04, 2005–06, 2006–07, 2007–08, 2009–10, 2013–14, 2014–15, 2016–17
- Coppa Italia
  - Winners (9): 1963–64, 1968–69, 1979–80, 1980–81, 1983–84, 1985–86, 1990–91, 2006–07, 2007–08
  - Runners-up: (8): 1936–37, 1940–41, 1992–93, 2002–03, 2004–05, 2005–06, 2009–10, 2012–13
- Supercoppa Italiana
  - Winners (2): 2001, 2007

=== European titles ===
- European Cup / UEFA Champions League
  - Runners-up (1): 1983–84
- UEFA Cup / UEFA Europa League
  - Runners-up (2): 1990–91, 2022–23
- UEFA Conference League
  - Winners (1): 2021–22
- Inter-Cities Fairs Cup
  - Winners (1): 1960–61

=== Other titles ===
- Serie B
  - Winners (1): 1951–52
- Anglo-Italian Cup
  - Winners (1): 1972

== Records and statistics ==
Historical AS Roma positions in Serie A

Francesco Totti currently holds Roma's official appearance record, having made 786 appearances in all competitions, over the course of 25 seasons from 1993 until 2017. He also holds the record for Serie A appearances with 619, as he passed Giacomo Losi on 1 March 2008 during a home match against Parma.

Including all competitions, Totti is the all-time leading goalscorer for Roma with 307 goals since joining the club, 250 of which were scored in Serie A (another Roma record). Roberto Pruzzo, who was the all-time topscorer since 1988, comes in second in all competitions with 138. In 1930–31, Rodolfo Volk scored 29 goals in Serie A over the course of a single season. Not only was Volk the league's top scorer that year, he also set a Roma record for most goals scored in a season, which would later be matched by Edin Džeko in 2016–17.

Its major founders Fortitudo and Alba having been relegated at the end of 1926–27 campaign, new-founded Roma had to take part to Southern First Division championship (Serie B) for its inaugural season. Nevertheless, the FIGC decided on a special enlargement of first level division re-admitting AS Roma and SSC Napoli. The first ever official matches participated in by Roma was in the National Division, the predecessor of Serie A, of 1927–28, against Livorno, a 2–0 Roma win. The biggest ever victory recorded by Roma was 9–0 against Cremonese during the 1929–30 Serie A season. The heaviest defeat Roma have ever suffered is 1–7, which has occurred five times; against Juventus in 1931–32, Torino in 1947–48, Manchester United in 2006–07, Bayern Munich in 2014–15 and Fiorentina in 2018–19.

=== Divisional movements ===
Series	Years	Last	Promotions	Relegations
A	93	2025–26	47 times to Europe	▼1 (1951)
B	1	1951–52	▲1 (1952)	never
94 years of professional football in Italy since 1929
AS Roma created in National Division in 1927

=== UEFA club coefficient ranking ===
As of 26 August 2026

Rank	Club	Points
11	(Germany) Dortmund	100.750
12	(England) Chelsea	99.250
13	(Italy) Roma	97.750
14	(Portugal) Benfica	90.000
15	(Portugal) Sporting	77.500

=== UEFA rankings since 2006 ===
As of 26 August 2026

Season	Ranking	Movement	Points	Change
2025–26	13	▼ –3	97.750	▲ +17.350
2024–25	10	▼ –4	80.400	▼ –20.600
2023–24	6	▲ +4	101.000	▲ +4.000
2022–23	10	▲ +1	97.000	▼ –3.000
2021–22	11	▲ +2	100.000	▲ +10.000
2020–21	13	▲ +4	90.000	▲ +10.000
2019–20	17	▼ –3	80.000	▼ –1.000
2018–19	14	▲ +7	81.000	▲ +17.000
2017–18	21	▲ +16	64.000	▲ +25.000
2016–17	37	▲ +14	39.000	▲ +11.500
2015–16	51	▼ –5	27.500	▼ –22.000
2014–15	46	▲ +9	49.500	▲ +13.000
2013–14	55	▼ –12	26.500	▼ –14.000
2012–13	43	▼ –17	40.500	▼ –17.000
2011–12	26	▼ –10	57.500	▼ –15.500
2010–11	16	▼ –2	73.000	▲ +2.000
2009–10	14	0	71.000	▲ +5.000
2008–09	14	▲ +2	66.000	▲ +4.000
2007–08	16	0	62.000	▲ +5.000
2006–07	16	▲ +1	57.000	▲ +3.000

=== Football club Elo rating ===
As of 26 August 2026

Rank	Club	Points
20	(Brazil) Palmeiras	1825
21	(Italy) Napoli	1825
22	(Italy) Roma	1821
23	(England) Brentford	1819
24	(Portugal) Benfica	1818

== As a company ==
NEEP Roma Holding (Group)
- Revenue: ▲€128.520 million (2013–14)
- Operating income: ▲ (€26.950 million) (2013–14)
- Net income: ▲ (€40.107 million) (2013–14) (Note: Included minority interests)
- Total assets: ▲€386.31 million (2013–14)
- Total equity: ▲€43.398 million (2013–14)
- Owner: AS Roma SPV LLC (91%); James Pallotta; Thomas R. DiBenedetto; Michael Ruane; Richard D'Amore; Starwood Capital; Raptor Holdco LLC (9%); James Pallotta
- Subsidiaries: AS Roma SpA (79.044%); AS Roma Real Estate (100%); Stadio TdV
- Website: www.asroma.com

AS Roma
- Traded as: BIT: ASR
- Revenue: ▼€175 million (2016–17)
- Operating income: ▼ (€14 million) (2016–17)
- Net income: ▼ (€42 million) (2016–17)
- Total assets: ▲€436 million (2016–17)
- Total equity: ▲ (€89 million) (2016–17)
- Owner: NEEP Roma Holding (79.044%); other (20.956%)
- Subsidiaries: Soccer S.a.s. di Brand Management; ASR Media and Sponsorship
- Website: www.asroma.com
- Footnotes in a consolidated basis

Since 1999, during Franco Sensi's period in charge, Associazione Sportiva Roma has been a listed Società per azioni on Borsa Italiana. From 2004 to 2011, Roma's shares are distributed between; 67.1% to Compagnia Italpetroli SpA (the Sensi family holding; Banca di Roma later acquired 49% stake on Italpetroli due to debt restructuring) and 32.9% to other public shareholders.

Along with Lazio and Juventus, Roma is one of only three quotated Italian clubs. According to The Football Money League published by consultants Deloitte, in the 2010–11 season, Roma was the 15th highest-earning football club in the world with an estimated revenue of €143.5 million.

In April 2008, after months of speculation, George Soros was confirmed by Rosella Sensi, then-CEO of A.S. Roma, to be bidding for a takeover. The takeover bid was successively rejected by the Sensi family, who instead preferred to maintain the club's ownership. On 17 August 2008 club chairman and owner Franco Sensi died after a long illness; his place at the chairmanship of the club was successively taken by his daughter Rosella.

Since the takeover in 2011, NEEP Roma Holding S.p.A. has owned all shares Sensi previously hold. NEEP, itself a joint venture, was held by DiBenedetto AS Roma LLC (later renamed to AS Roma SPV, LLC) and Unicredit in 60–40 ratio from 2011 to 2013, which the former had four real person shareholders in equal ratio, led by future Roma president Thomas R. DiBenedetto (2011–12). The takeover also activated a mandatory bid of shares from the general public, however not all minority shareholders were willing to sell their shares. The mandatory bid meant NEEP held 78.038% of shares of AS Roma (increased from 67.1% of the Sensi). On 1 August 2013, the president of Roma as well as one of the four American shareholders of AS Roma SPV, LLC, James Pallotta, bought an additional 9% shares of NEEP Roma Holding from Unicredit (through Raptor Holdco LLC), as the bank was not willing to fully participate in the capital increase of NEEP from €120,000 to €160,008,905 (excluding share premium). On 4 April 2014 Starwood Capital Group also became the fifth shareholder of AS Roma SPV, as well as forming a strategic partnership with AS Roma SpA to develop real estate around the new stadium. The private investment firm was represented by Zsolt Kohalmi in AS Roma SPV, who was appointed on 4 April as a partner and head of European acquisitions of the firm. On 11 August 2014, UniCredit sold the remain shares on NEEP (of 31%) for €33 million which meant AS Roma SPV LLC (91%) and Raptor Holdco LLC (9%) were the sole intermediate holding company of AS Roma SpA.

Since re-capitalization in 2003–04, Roma had a short-lived financial self-sustainability, until the takeover in 2011. The club had set up a special amortisation fund using Articolo 18-bis Legge 91/1981 mainly for the abnormal signings prior 2002–03 season, (such as Davide Bombardini for €11 million account value in June 2002, when the flopped player exchange boosted 2001–02 season result) and the tax payment of 2002–03 was rescheduled. In 2004–05, Roma made a net profit of €10,091,689 and followed by €804,285 in 2005–06. In 2006–07 season the accounting method changed to IFRS, which meant that the 2005–06 result was reclassified as net loss of €4,051,905 and 2006–07 season was net income of €10,135,539 (€14.011 million as a group). Moreover, the special fund (€80,189,123) was removed from the asset and co-currently for the equity as scheduled, meant Roma group had a negative equity of €8.795 million on 30 June 2007. Nevertheless, the club had sold the brand to a subsidiary which boost the profit in a separate financial statement, which La Repubblica described as "doping". In 2007–08, Roma made a net income of €18,699,219. (€19 million as a group) However, 2008–09 saw the decrease of gate and TV income, co-currently with finishing sixth in Serie A, which saw Roma make a net loss of €1,894,330. (€1.56 million as a group) The gate and TV income further slipped in 2009–10 with a net loss of €21,917,292 (already boosted by the sale of Alberto Aquilani; €22 million as a group) despite sporting success (finishing in second place in 2009–10). Moreover, despite a positive equity as a separate company (€105,142,589), the AS Roma Group had a negative equity on the consolidated balance sheet, and fell from +€8.8 million to −€13.2 million. In the 2010–11 season, Roma was administered by UniCredit as the Sensi family failed to repay the bank and the club was put on the market, and were expected to have a quiet transfer window. Concurrently with no selling profit on the players, Roma's net loss rose to €30,589,137 (€30.778 million as a group) and the new owner already planned a re-capitalization after the mandatory bid on the shares. On the positive side, TV income was increased from €75,150,744 to €78,041,642, and gate income increased from €23,821,218 to €31,017,179. This was because Roma entered 2010–11 Champions League, which counter-weighed the effect of the new collective agreement of Serie A. In 2011–12, the renewal of squad and participation in 2011–12 UEFA Europa League had worsened the financial result, which the €50 million capital increase (in advance) was counter-weighted totally by the net loss. In the 2012–13 season, the participation in domestic league only, was not only not harmful to the revenue but increase in gate income as well as decrease in wage bill, however Roma still did not yet break even (€40.130 million net loss in consolidated accounts). NEEP Roma also re-capitalized AS Roma in advance for another €26,550,000 during 2012–13. A proposed capital increase by €100 million for Roma was announced on 25 June 2014; however, until 22 May 2014, NEEP already injected €108 million into the club, which depends on public subscription; more than €8 million would convert to medium-long-term loan from shareholder instead of becoming share capital. Another capital increase was carried in 2018.

A joint venture of Roma, which was owned by Roma (37.5%), S.S. Lazio (37.5%) and Parma F.C.(25%), Società Diritti Sportivi S.r.l., was in the process of liquidation since 2005. The company was a joint-venture of four football clubs, including Fiorentina. After the bankruptcy of Fiorentina however, both Roma and Lazio had increased their shares ratio from 25% to 37.5%. Another subsidiary, "Soccer S.A.S. di Brand Management S.r.l.", was a special-purpose entity (SPV) that Roma sold their brand to the subsidiary in 2007. In February 2015, another SPV, "ASR Media and Sponsorship S.r.l", was set up to secure a five-year bank loan of €175 million from Goldman Sachs, for three-month Euribor (min. 0.75%) + 6.25% spread (i.e. min. 7% interests rate p.a.).

In 2015, Inter and Roma were the only two Italian clubs that were sanctioned by UEFA for breaking UEFA Financial Fair Play Regulations, which they signed settlement agreements with UEFA. It was followed by Milan in 2018.

Roma had compliance with the requirements and overall objective of the settlement agreement in 2018, which the club exited from settlement regime.

In July 2026, John Galantic joined AS Roma as the football club’s chief executive officer. Galantic previously had a relationship with the club as a board member from 2014 to 2020.

=== Superleague Formula ===
AS Roma had a team in the Superleague Formula race car series where teams were sponsored by football clubs. Roma's driver was ex-IndyCar Series driver Franck Perera. The team had posted three podiums and was operated by Alan Docking Racing.

== See also ==
- Football in Italy
- European Club Association
