= 1943–44 Roman War Championship =

1943-44 Roman Football Championship

Tournament information
- Sport: Association football
- Location: Rome
- Dates: December 4, 1943–July 2, 1944
- Administrators: Direttorio XI Zona/Comitato Regionale Laziale
- Format: Round-robin tournament
- Participants: 10

Final positions
- Champion: SS Lazio (1st title)

Tournament statistics
- Matches played: 90
- Goals scored: 341 (3.79 per match)
- Top scorer: Umberto Lombardini (21)

The 1943–1944 Roman War Championship, better known as the Roman Mixed National Division Championship, was the first of two mixed regional National Division championships played in the Lazio territory during World War II. It was organized by the Direttorio XI Zona and was contested by ten Roman teams. The championship was won by SS Lazio, who finished the tournament one point ahead of runners-up AS Roma. Teams from different levels of national and regional soccer at the time took part in the competition, from Serie A (first level) to the Prima Divisione (fourth level).

Originally, this edition of the Roman championship was valid as Lazio's regional phase of the 1944 National Division (Campionato Alta Italia), but the Liberation of Rome prevented the winner of the championship, Lazio, from taking part in the interzonal finals for the title. The championship had in fact ended on May 28, 1944 (only one match remained to be played), and the following week the Direttorio XI Zona initiated the "four-team tournament", a post-season competition for the top four finishing teams. Following the Liberation of Rome (June 4, 1944) the tournament was suspended for two weeks. The Comitato Regionale Laziale (the new name of the Direttorio XI Zona after the liberation) organized the four-team tournament, which was won by Roma on June 25, and arranged for the only unplayed match to be played on July 2, after the end of the postseason tournament.

== Season ==
=== Background ===
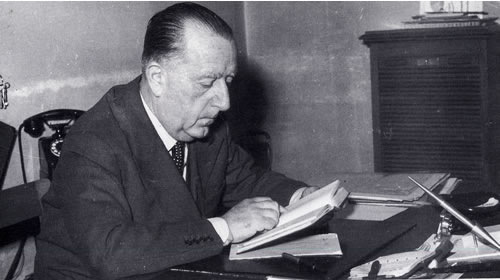
Luigi Ridolfi, president of the FIGC during the fall of fascism.

On July 25, 1943, Mussolini was overthrown by King Victor Emmanuel III, imprisoned in a secret place and replaced by Marshal Pietro Badoglio, thus ending the 20-year fascist regime and removing from office all those who had held positions in the regime; on the same day, Marquis Luigi Ridolfi Vay da Verrazzano, president of the F.I.G.C., also resigned. Inevitably, the structure of football collapsed and the teams released their players, in most cases not organizing training sessions during the summer of 1943; however, many players continued to train independently of the clubs, allowing the game to survive despite the absence of an organization behind it. Meanwhile, after confusing diplomatic maneuvers, Badoglio and the King decided to accept the armistice imposed by the Allies: Italy surrendered, signing it on September 3, later made public on September 8. Soccer never stopped in Italy, and friendly matches continued to be played throughout the peninsula amid the war and bombing.

In the fall, on November 27, the federation, which was governed by the Republic of Salò in the north, announced in a special communiqué that the 1943-1944 football championship would be played through a mixed system, with Serie A, B and C clubs playing in a single tournament, divided into regional groups, and then a single group between the finalists. Even before the federal communiqué, the Direttorio di Zona was planning to organize an independent championship, which it intended to call the "Campionato Regionale di 1ª Categoria", which would award the title of Roman Champion. The news of the official resumption of the championship was greeted with great enthusiasm, and the organization of three football championships began in the capital: the Boys' Championship, intended for the youngest players, the 2nd Category Championship, and the 1st Category Championship, the winner of which would win the title of Roman Champion. The initial organization of the first category was decreed by the Direttorio XI Zona, a name adopted by the Direttorio in 1934 with the inclusion of Lazio in the federal championship; in collaboration with engineer Ottorino Barassi, the Direttorio opened registration to all teams in the first three divisions of the Italian league; thus, eight teams initially registered: Lazio and Roma (Serie A), Mater (Serie B), Ala Italia, Alba, Littorio and Vigili del Fuoco (Serie C), and La Disperata, which had just won promotion to Serie C by winning the 1942-1943 Lazio First Division championship. A ninth team, Elettronica, asked to participate, but the Direttorio initially decided not to admit them. Later, Trastevere joined Elettronica in appealing to the Direttorio to be included in the first division championship, and the appeals committee, meeting on the evening of December 1, decided to grant the two clubs' request, increasing the number of participating teams from eight to ten. By December 4, everything was in place for the first Roman War Championship to be played. The only changes in the days leading up to the championship were the names: the Gruppo Sportivo Ala Italia changed its name to Società Sportiva Tirrenia, while the Gruppo Sportivo Littorio adopted the name Società Sportiva Avia.

=== Championship ===
At the same time as the invasion of France, the Allies occupied Rome (June 4) and, within a few weeks, the rest of central Italy. As mentioned above, the city of Rome, being an open city, was relatively unaffected by the war; the main problems that arose were the possibility of bombing (an eventuality to which the Direttorio responded by allowing the referee to order a brief suspension of the game in the event of an air alert, and only if the alert posed a real danger to the players and the public) and the lack of playing fields, especially those used by the military stationed in the city. This second difficulty repeatedly forced teams to play the rounds over several days (usually between Saturday and Sunday), sharing the few available fields and also playing at unusual times. Among the most frequently used facilities were the Stadio della Rondinella, the Motovelodromo Appio, the Montesacro field and the Apollodoro field; the Stadio Nazionale, which was initially accessible, became rarely available after the Anzio landing until it was requisitioned; Roma thus had to play the remaining matches at the Motovelodromo Appio, as did Lazio, who often played at the Rondinella.

The tournament officially began on December 4, 1943, with the match Avia-Vigili del Fuoco 2-0: the first goal was scored by Elio Bianchi in the 32nd minute of the first half. The other scheduled matches followed on December 5, with the exception of Alba-Lazio 0-4, played on December 8. The second day, played on December 11, was marked by two big wins, which were not uncommon during the tournament: Lazio defeated Elettronica 7-0 at home, with Lombardini scoring a hat-trick, while M.A.T.E.R. defeated Trastevere 9-2 away, with a hat-trick from Pisani and a brace from Marcello Pieri (III); four of the Pieri brothers, Enrico (I), Nicola (II), Marcello (III) and Pieri (V), played for M.A.T.E.R. In the third round, M.A.T.E.R. recorded another big victory, a 7-1 win over Elettronica, while Lazio and Roma won against Vigili del Fuoco and Trastevere respectively; on the fourth day, Trastevere got its first point by drawing 3-3 with Avia, while Roma overcame Elettronica, in the match played on Christmas Eve, 8-1 with 5 goals from Amedeo Amadei; Lazio defeated M.A.T.E.R., thus confirming the trend of the two main Capitoline clubs, which had collected as many victories in the first four days. Between the fourth and fifth day of the first round, the Gruppo Sportivo La Disperata changed its name to Società Sportiva Juventus, and Lazio and Roma finished the fifth round (the first of 1944) in a draw: 1-1 between Lazio and Juventus, 2-2 between Roma and M.A.T.E.R.

The distance between the two leaders and the runners-up remained unchanged at 2 points due to the draw of Tirrenia. On the sixth day, the first Rome Derby was played: both teams had some problems with their attacking line, and Lazio had to play without their starting goalkeeper Uber Gradella, who was disqualified. The match was played at the Stadio Nazionale in front of 13,000 fans, and although Lazio played the better game, according to the press, the match ended in a draw: a goal by Manola (8') was followed by a goal by Amadei (19'). Tirrenia, taking advantage of the draw between Lazio and Roma, won 5-0 against Juventus (4 goals by Perugini). After this match, Oreste Roccasecca (II) left Roma for Vigili del Fuoco: he became the only player in all of Italy to play for two different teams in the wartime championship. On the seventh day, the match between Lazio and Tirrenia ended 1-1: Koenig's first goal for Lazio (71') was followed by Celestini's goal a minute later, leaving Roma, who had beaten Avia 2-0 the day before, alone at the top of the table. For the first time, the top two teams were separated and one of them left the other in first place. The next day, both Lazio and Roma won their matches (against Avia and Alba), as did Tirrenia, who beat Trastevere 5-2. Tirrenia, in 3rd place with 12 points, was already 4 points ahead of fourth-placed M.A.T.E.R. and Juventus. The first round ended in two halves: three games were played on January 30th, while the remaining two (Alba-Avia and Vigili del Fuoco-Roma) were played on February 13th. The second of these matches was suspended because of the improper behavior of the player Glauco Signorini, right wing of Vigili del Fuoco, who threatened the referee Giuseppe Fois (one of the main referees of the league, former referee of Serie A in the pre-war period) to the point that he was forced to end the match in the 85th minute with the score 2-0 for Roma; the Direttorio later homologated this result.

The second round began on February 27, 1944, the 10th matchday: Lazio and Roma were again level on points, as Roma's draw with Juventus was matched by Lazio's 3-0 win over Alba; Tirrenia missed the chance to move within a point of the top two, losing 1-0 at home to M.A.T.E.R.. The 11th day saw another defeat for Tirrenia, who lost 4-2 to Roma, while Lazio beat Elettronica 6-1; the other matches ended in three draws that did not really change the standings. The 12th round saw two more wins for Lazio and Roma, against Vigili del Fuoco and Trastevere respectively; Tirrenia also returned to winning ways, and Alba, with a 2-1 win over Juventus, joined Elettronica at the bottom of the standings with 6 points. In the following round, both Roma and Lazio won, while Tirrenia drew at home against Alba, thus increasing its distance from the leaders; Elettronica, defeated by Roma, remained in last place. The 14th day saw the final separation between Lazio and Roma: the bianco-celesti defeated Juventus 4-0, while the giallo-rossi drew 1-1 with M.A.T.E.R.; these results were decisive, as they gave Lazio the points advantage that allowed them to win the championship at the end of the tournament. In the other matches, Tirrenia won the match against Vigili del Fuoco, while Alba returned to the bottom of the table, losing the direct match against Trastevere. The derby between Lazio and Roma, played on the 15th day, again ended in a 0-0 draw. In front of a crowd of 18,000, the game was poorly played by both teams, due to the weather conditions, characterized by a strong and hot wind, which weakened the players and made them less agile. Roma goalkeeper Guido Masetti was injured after saving a shot from Michele Andreolo, dislocating his shoulder: he was therefore replaced by left-back Paolo Jacobini, while Masetti moved to the left wing.

Trastevere's first lineup problems began against Vigili del Fuoco, who fielded only 9 players and lost 5-1; Tirrenia had won 3-0 against Juventus, but the game was later canceled due to a technical error by referee Cappucci and rescheduled for July 2. On the 17th, Trastevere again had line-up problems and could only field 10 players: they lost 9-3 to Tirrenia in the highest-scoring match of the championship; Colaneri scored 5 goals, matching Amadei's tally against Elettronica on the 4th. The draw between Roma and Lazio kept the gap unchanged, so the following three days, in which both teams won their respective matches, did not change the final result: Lazio won the Roman championship one day earlier, beating Trastevere 8-0 on May 27, making Roma's 4-2 win over Vigili del Fuoco on May 28 irrelevant. At the end of the tournament, Umberto Lombardini was the top scorer with 21 goals in 16 matches, while Amedeo Amadei had the best goalscoring average with 16 goals in 8 appearances.

Although the winner would automatically qualify for the final of the Italian championship, wartime events prevented this from happening: the liberation of Rome on June 4, 1944 did not allow Lazio, who had won the title of "Roman champion" just a week earlier, to participate in the interzonal final. The Direttorio XI Zona, which had come under the control of the FIGC of the Kingdom of the South and renamed itself the Comitato Regionale Laziale, finished the "four-team tournament" that had begun the day before the arrival of the Allied troops, with the last match played on July 2, 1944. In any case, the tournament retained the status of National Division (also to distinguish it from the Roman First Division championship), while becoming an autonomous regional league, independent of the wartime championship organized by the Fascist FIGC. In addition to the league matches, matches were organized between "representative" teams: these were teams composed of a selection of the best players of the league, divided according to different criteria; for example, there was the challenge between "Representative A" and "Representative B" (or "Rappresentativa Assi" and "Rappresentativa Giovani"), played in April: the "A" representative was composed of the best players of Roma and Lazio, while the other one was composed of players of the other teams; this was for charity purposes.

== Participating teams ==
Club	Previous season
Alba Roma	2nd in Group I of Serie C
Avia	4th in Group L of Serie C
Elettronica	Group B of the First Division
Juventus Roma	Champion of Lazio First Division
Lazio	9th in Serie A
MATER	12th in Serie B
Roma	9th in Serie A
Tirrenia	3rd in Group I of Serie C
Trastevere	Group C of the First Division
VV.FF. Roma	4th in Group L of Serie C

== Coaches ==
Team	Coach	Team	Coach
Alba	Orlando Tognotti	M.A.T.E.R.	Fulvio Bernardini
Avia	Giovanni Degni	Roma	Guido Masetti
Elettronica	Attilio Ferraris (IV)	Tirrenia	?
Juventus	?	Trastevere	?
Lazio	Dino Canestri	Vigili del Fuoco	Annesi

== Final standings ==
Pos.	Team	Pts	Pld	W	D	L	GF	GA
1.	Lazio	32	18	14	4	0	60	8
2.	Roma	31	18	13	5	0	62	17
3.	Tirrenia	25	18	11	3	4	44	27
4.	MATER	17	18	3	11	4	35	27
5.	Juventus Roma	16	18	5	6	7	19	28
6.	VV.FF. Roma	15	18	5	5	8	21	25
6.	Avia	15	18	5	5	8	30	40
8.	Alba Roma	10	18	2	6	10	24	42
8.	Elettronica	10	18	3	4	11	19	59
10.	Trastevere	9	18	3	3	12	27	68

Legend:

Champion of Rome and qualified for the four-team tournament.
Qualified for the four-team tournament.

Notes:

Two points for a win, one for a draw, zero for a loss.

== Results ==
=== Calendar ===
1st half of the season (1st)		Matchday 1	2nd half of the season (10th)
Dec. 4	2-0	Avia-Vigili del Fuoco	0-0	Feb. 27
Dec. 5	2-0	Roma-Juventus Roma	1-1	Mar 12
Dec. 5	0-1	Mater-Tirrenia	1-0	Feb. 26
Dec. 8	2-1	Elettronica-Trastevere	2-2	Feb. 27
Dec. 8	0-4	Alba-Lazio	0-3	Mar. 12

1st half of the season (2nd)		Matchday 2	2nd half of the season (11th)
Dec. 11	1-2	Tirrenia-Roma	2-4	Mar. 19
Dec. 11	1-1	Vigili del Fuoco-Alba	1-1	Mar. 19
Dec. 12	9-2	Mater-Trastevere	2-2	Mar. 18
Dec. 12	3-2	Juventus Roma-Avia	1-1	Mar. 18
Dec. 12	7-0	Lazio-Elettronica	6-1	Mar. 18

1st half of the season (3rd)		Matchday 3	2nd half of the season (12th)
Dec. 18	1-3	Avia-Tirrenia	0-2	Mar. 25
Dec. 18	1-2	Vigili del Fuoco-Lazio	0-1	Mar. 26
Dec. 19	1-0	Juventus Roma-Alba	1-2	Mar. 26
Dec. 19	7-1	Mater-Elettronica	0-0	Mar. 25
Dec. 19	4-0	Roma-Trastevere	7-1	Mar. 26

1st half of the season (4th)		Matchday 4	2nd half of the season (13th)
24 dic.	1-8	Elettronica-Roma	0-5	Apr. 2
24 dic.	3-2	Tirrenia-Alba	1-1	Apr. 1
26 dic.	0-2	Juventus Roma-Vigili del Fuoco	0-2	Apr. 1
26 dic.	2-0	Lazio-Mater	4-2	Apr. 2
26 dic.	3-3	Trastevere-Avia	2-3	Apr. 1

1st half of the season (5th)		Matchday 5	2nd half of the season (14th)
Dec. 31	0-0	Vigili del Fuoco-Tirrenia	1-2	Apr. 22
Jan. 1	6-0	Avia-Elettronica	1-4	Apr. 22
Jan. 1	1-1	Lazio-Juventus Roma	4-0	Apr. 23
Jan. 2	1-2	Alba-Trastevere	1-2	Apr. 22
Jan. 2	2-2	Roma-Mater	1-1	Apr. 23

1st half of the season (6th)		Matchday 6	2nd half of the season (15th)
Jan. 8	1-1	Mater-Avia	2-2	May 6
Jan. 8	5-0	Tirrenia-Juventus Roma	2-1	July 2
Jan. 9	1-1	Roma-Lazio	0-0	May 7
Jan. 9	0-3	Vigili del Fuoco-Trastevere	5-1	May 6
Jan. 9	0-0	Elettronica-Alba	1-4	May 7

1st half of the season (7th)		Matchday 7	2nd half of the season (16th)
Jan. 15	0-2	Avia-Roma	1-6	May 14
Jan. 15	3-0	Juventus Roma-Trastevere	2-1	May 14
Jan. 16	2-2	Alba-Mater	2-2	May 13
Jan. 16	1-1	Lazio-Tirrenia	6-1	May 14
Jan. 16	1-0	Vigili del Fuoco-Elettronica	1-3	May 14

1st half of the season (8th)		Matchday 8	2nd half of the season (17th)
Jan. 22	2-2	Mater-Vigili del Fuoco	1-2	May 20
Jan. 22	0-1	Avia-Lazio	0-7	May 21
Jan. 23	0-0	Elettronica-Juventus Roma	2-4	May 21
Jan. 23	5-2	Roma-Alba	6-2	May 20
Jan. 23	2-5	Trastevere-Tirrenia	3-9	May 21

1st half of the season (9th)		Matchday 9	2nd half of the season (18th)
Jan. 30	0-0	Juventus Roma-Mater	1-1	May 27
Jan. 30	2-0	Tirrenia-Elettronica	4-2	May 28
Jan. 30	0-2	Trastevere-Lazio	0-8	May 27
Feb. 13	3-5	Alba-Avia	0-2	May 28
Feb. 20	0-2	Vigili del Fuoco-Roma	2-4	May 28

== Statistics ==
=== Teams ===
==== Points by matchday ====
	1st	2nd	3rd	4th	5th	6th	7th	8th	9th	10th	11th	12th	13th	14th	15th	16th	17th	18th	
	Alba Roma	0	1	1	1	1	2	3	3	3	3	4	6	7	7	9	10	10	10
Avia Roma	2	2	2	3	5	6	6	6	8	9	10	10	12	12	13	13	13	15	
Elettronica	2	2	2	2	2	3	3	4	4	5	5	6	6	8	8	10	10	10	
Juventus Roma	0	2	4	4	5	5	7	8	9	10	11	11	11	11	11	13	15	16	
Lazio	2	4	6	8	9	10	11	13	15	17	19	21	23	25	26	28	30	32	
MATER	0	2	4	4	5	6	7	8	9	11	12	13	13	14	15	16	16	17	
Roma	2	4	6	8	9	10	12	14	16	17	19	21	23	24	25	27	29	31	
Tirrenia	2	2	4	6	7	9	10	12	14	14	14	16	17	19	21	21	23	25	
Trastevere	0	0	0	1	3	5	5	5	5	6	7	7	7	9	9	9	9	9	
VV.FF. Roma	0	1	1	3	4	4	6	7	7	8	9	9	11	11	13	13	15	15	

=== Individual statistics ===
==== Top goalscorers ====
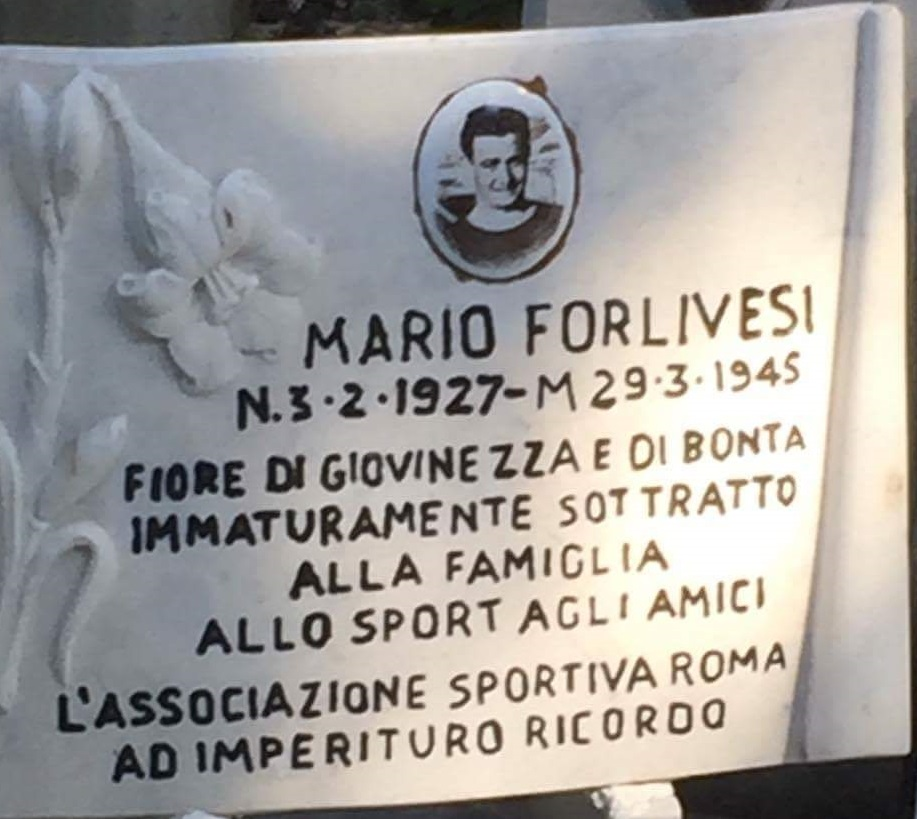
Gravestone of Mario Forlivesi. One of the tournament's best newcomers, he died of meningitis in April 1945.

Player	Club	Goals
(Italy) Umberto Lombardini	Lazio	21
(Germany) Engelbert König	Lazio	16
(Italy) Amedeo Amadei	Roma	16
(Albania) Naim Kryeziu	Roma	11
(Italy) Lelio Colaneri	Tirrenia	10
(Italy) Luigi Perugini	Tirrenia	10
(Italy) Marcello Pieri (III)	MATER	9
(Italy) Mario Forlivesi	Roma	8
(Italy) Alessandro Capponi	Lazio	7
(Italy) Enzo Cozzolini	Roma	7

== Four-team tournament ==
1944 Four-team tournament
Tournament information
- Sport: Association football
- Location: Rome
- Dates: June 2, 1944–June 25, 1944
- Administrators: Associazione Sportiva Roma
- Format: Knockout tournament
- Teams: 4

Final positions
- Champion: AS Roma

Tournament statistics
- Matches played: 4
- Goals scored: 28 (7 per match)

The four-team tournament was held at the end of the war championship, where the four major teams of the championship faced each other: Lazio, Roma, Mater and Tirrenia. The idea of holding a four-team tournament at the end of the season had been proposed since the beginning of the championship, but it remained unrealized until Associazione Sportiva Roma took over the organization of the tournament in June.

=== Format ===
The format was two semi-finals, followed by finals for first and third place. The original idea was to allow teams to completely change their line-ups, temporarily using players from the clubs excluded from the competition, in order to make the matches more entertaining. However, this idea was not fully supported by the four participating clubs. A compromise was reached, allowing each team to use four players in addition to their own. Taking advantage of this rule, all the teams strengthened their squads by taking players from the excluded teams, with the exception of Lazio, who, confident of their superiority in the league, decided not to use any players other than those registered with them.

=== Matches ===
The matches were first place Lazio against third place Tirrenia and second place Roma against fourth place MATER. Lazio did not take any players from other teams; Tirrenia's lineup included Alberto Giusti from Avia, Otello Ricci and Renato Fiorelli from Vigili del Fuoco; MATER brought Egeo Rossi and Oberdan Marchionni from Juventus, Renato Antolini from Avia and Oreste Roccasecca from Vigili; Roma strengthened its team with Antonio Fusco (I) and Alberto Piccinini from Avia, Lido Loveri from Vigili and Ippolito Ippoliti from Juventus. The four-team tournament kicked off on June 2 with Lazio and Tirrenia facing each other: against all expectations, Tirrenia won the match, thanks mainly to Lelio Colaneri's hat-trick. Roma, on the other hand, easily beat MATER, with Kryeziu scoring three goals. The final for 3rd and 4th place was decided by Koenig and Mancini, who scored the goals that allowed Lazio to come back after MATER had taken the lead thanks to Pieri III and Roccasecca. The final was won by Roma against Tirrenia thanks to Amadei's hat-trick and Kryeziu's goal: Amadei and Kryeziu finished the tournament as top scorers with 4 goals each.

=== Results ===
Semifinals
SS Lazio	2
Tirrenia	4
AS Roma	7
MATER	3

Finals
AS Roma	4
Tirrenia	0
Third place
SS Lazio	5
MATER	3

==== Semifinals ====
2 June 1944
17:00

SS Lazio	2–4	Tirrenia
König 25'; Lombardini 41'	Report	3', 7', 32' Colaneri; 72' Perugini

Stadio Nazionale PNF, Rome
Referee: Cappucci (Rome)
3 June 1944
15:30

AS Roma	7–3	MATER
Kryeziu 10', 66', 81'; Amadei 28' (rig.); Cozzolini 78'; Schiavetti 82', 85'	Report	13' Marchionni; 20' Pieri III; 64' Lombardi

Stadio Nazionale PNF, Rome
Referee: Orlandini (Rome)

==== Third place play-off ====
22 June 1944
16:00

SS Lazio	5–3	MATER
König 26', 43'; Lombardini 64'; Mancini 68', 76'	Report	10', 15' Pieri III; 50' Roccasecca

Stadio Nazionale PNF, Rome
Referee: De Lucia (Rome)

==== Final ====
25 June 1944
16:00

AS Roma	4–0	Tirrenia
Kryeziu 2'; Amadei 51', 57', 89'	Report

Stadio Nazionale PNF, Rome
Referee: Fois (Rome)

=== Statistics ===
==== Individual statistics ====
===== Top goalscorers =====
Player	Club	Goals
(Italy) Amedeo Amadei	Roma	4
(Albania) Naim Kryeziu	Roma	4
(Italy) Lelio Colaneri	Tirrenia	3
(Germany) Engelbert König	Lazio	3
(Italy) Marcello Pieri (III)	MATER	3
(Italy) Umberto Lombardini	Lazio	2
(Italy) Giuseppe Mancini	Lazio	2
(Italy) Enrico Schiavetti	Roma	2

== See also ==
- List of SS Lazio seasons
- List of AS Roma seasons

== Bibliography ==
- Cacozza, Daniele; Fontanelli, Carlo (1998). Scudetto a Spezia. Partite e protagonisti del campionato di guerra 1943-44 [Scudetto in La Spezia. Matches and Players in the 1943-44 War Championship] (in Italian). Fornacette di Calcinaia: Mariposa Editrice.
