= January 3 =

January 3 this year in various calendars
- Saturday, 3 January 2026
Akan	Kwamemene
Armenian	17 Arach 1475
Aztec	Huei Tozoztli 13, 7 Cipactli
Babylonian	13 Kislimu, 2336 SE
Balinese pawukon	Luang, Pepet, Beteng, Sri, Keliwon, Was, Saniscara of Krulut, Ludra, Tulus, Raja
Bengali	19 Poush, BS 1432
Chinese	Yin Fire Ox・Willow Mansion; Wood Snake Year, Month 11, Day 15 (Dongzhi, 2 days until Xiaohan)
Common Era	3 January 2026 CE
Coptic	25 Koiak, AM 1742
Egyptian	22 Pachon, 2774 NE
Ethiopian	25 Tākḫśāś, 2018 Amätä Məhrät
French Republican	Décade II, Quartidi de Nivôse de l'Année 234 de la République
Gregorian	3 January, AD 2026
Hebrew	14 Tevet, AM 5786
Hindu	Ārdrā・Brahman; Solar: 19 Pauṣa, 1947 SE; Lunisolar: Pūrṇimā, Śukla pakṣa of Pauṣa, 2082 VE; Siddhārthin・5126 KY・1,872,578
Icelandic	Laugardagur, 11 Mörsugur 2025
Islamic	14 Rajab, AH 1447 (using tabular method)
ISO week date	2026-W01-6
Japanese	15 Shimotsuki, Reiwa 8 (Tōji, 2 days until Shōkan)
Julian	21 December, AD 2025 (AM 7535)
Julian day	2461044
Korean	15 Jwidal, 4358 DE
Maya	13.0.13.4.1; 19 Kankin, 7 Imix
Roman	ante diem XII Kalendas Ianuarias, MMDCCLXXIX AUC
Solar Hijri	13 Dey, SH 1404
Tibetan	15 mgo, shing mo sbrul 2152 or 1771 or 999

<<	January					>>
Su	Mo	Tu	We	Th	Fr	Sa
				1	2	3
4	5	6	7	8	9	10
11	12	13	14	15	16	17
18	19	20	21	22	23	24
25	26	27	28	29	30	31
2026

January 3 in recent years
2026 (Saturday)
2025 (Friday)
2024 (Wednesday)
2023 (Tuesday)
2022 (Monday)
2021 (Sunday)
2020 (Friday)
2019 (Thursday)
2018 (Wednesday)
2017 (Tuesday)

January 3 is the third day of the year in the Gregorian calendar; 362 days remain until the end of the year (363 in leap years).

== Events ==
=== Pre-1600 ===
- 69 – The Roman legions on the Rhine refuse to declare their allegiance to Galba, instead proclaiming their legate, Aulus Vitellius, as emperor.
- 250 – Emperor Decius orders everyone in the Roman Empire (except Jews) to make sacrifices to the Roman gods.
- 1521 – Pope Leo X excommunicates Martin Luther in the papal bull Decet Romanum Pontificem.

=== 1601–1900 ===
- 1653 – By the Coonan Cross Oath, the Eastern Church in India cuts itself off from colonial Portuguese tutelage.
- 1749 – Benning Wentworth issues the first of the New Hampshire Grants, leading to the establishment of Vermont.
- 1749 – The first issue of Berlingske, Denmark's oldest continually operating newspaper, is published.
- 1777 – American Revolutionary War: American forces under General George Washington defeat British forces at the Battle of Princeton, helping boost patriot morale.
- 1815 – Austria, the United Kingdom, and France form a secret defensive alliance against Prussia and Russia.
- 1833 – Captain James Onslow, in the Clio, reasserts British sovereignty over the Falkland Islands.
- 1848 – Joseph Jenkins Roberts is sworn in as the first president of Liberia.
- 1861 – American Civil War: Delaware votes not to secede from the United States.
- 1861 – American Civil War: Georgia state militia troops seize Fort Pulaski from Federal forces weeks before the state secedes from the Union.
- 1868 – Meiji Restoration in Japan: The Tokugawa shogunate is abolished; agents of Satsuma and Chōshū seize power.
- 1870 – Construction work begins on the Brooklyn Bridge in New York, United States.
- 1871 – In the Battle of Bapaume, an engagement in the Franco-Prussian War, General Louis Faidherbe's forces bring about a Prussian retreat.
- 1885 – Sino-French War: Beginning of the Battle of Núi Bop.

=== 1901–present ===
- 1911 – A magnitude 7.7 earthquake destroys the city of Almaty in Russian Turkestan.
- 1911 – A gun battle in the East End of London leaves two dead. It sparked a political row over the involvement of then-Home Secretary Winston Churchill.
- 1913 – An Atlantic coast storm sets the lowest confirmed barometric pressure reading (955.0 mb (28.20 inHg)) for a non-tropical system in the continental United States.
- 1913 – First Balkan War: Greece completes its capture of the eastern Aegean island of Chios, as the last Ottoman forces on the island surrender.
- 1920 – Over 640 are killed after a magnitude 6.4 earthquake strikes the Mexican states Puebla and Veracruz.
- 1933 – Minnie D. Craig becomes the first woman elected as Speaker of the North Dakota House of Representatives, the first woman to hold a Speaker position anywhere in the United States.
- 1944 – World War II: US flying ace Major Greg "Pappy" Boyington is shot down in his Vought F4U Corsair by Captain Masajiro Kawato flying a Mitsubishi A6M Zero.
- 1946 – Popular Canadian American jockey George Woolf suffers a concussion during a freak racing accident; he dies from the injury the following day. The annual George Woolf Memorial Jockey Award is created to honor him.
- 1947 – Proceedings of the U.S. Congress are televised for the first time.
- 1949 – The Bangko Sentral ng Pilipinas, the central bank of the Philippines, is established.
- 1953 – Frances P. Bolton and her son, Oliver from Ohio, become the first mother and son to serve simultaneously in the U.S. Congress.
- 1956 – A fire damages the top part of the Eiffel Tower.
- 1957 – The Hamilton Watch Company introduces the first electric watch.
- 1958 – The West Indies Federation is formed.
- 1959 – Alaska is admitted as the 49th U.S. state.
- 1961 – Cold War: After a series of economic retaliations against one another, the United States severs diplomatic relations with Cuba.
- 1961 – The SL-1 nuclear reactor, near Idaho Falls, Idaho, is destroyed by a steam explosion in the only reactor incident in the United States to cause immediate fatalities.
- 1961 – A protest by agricultural workers in Baixa de Cassanje, Portuguese Angola, turns into a revolt, opening the Angolan War of Independence, the first of the Portuguese Colonial Wars.
- 1961 – Aero Flight 311 crashes into the forest in Kvevlax, Finland, killing 25 people.
- 1962 – Pope John XXIII excommunicates Fidel Castro.
- 1976 – The International Covenant on Economic, Social and Cultural Rights, adopted by the United Nations General Assembly, comes into force.
- 1977 – Apple Computer is incorporated.
- 1987 – Varig Flight 797 crashes near Akouré in the Ivory Coast, resulting in 50 deaths.
- 1990 – United States invasion of Panama: Manuel Noriega, former leader of Panama, surrenders to American forces.
- 1992 – CommutAir Flight 4821 crashes on approach to Adirondack Regional Airport, in Saranac Lake, New York, killing two people.
- 1993 – In Moscow, Russia, George H. W. Bush and Boris Yeltsin sign the second Strategic Arms Reduction Treaty (START).
- 1994 – Baikal Airlines Flight 130 crashes near Mamoney, Irkutsk, Russia, resulting in 125 deaths.
- 1999 – The Mars Polar Lander is launched by NASA.
- 2002 – Israeli–Palestinian conflict: Israeli forces seize the Palestinian freighter Karine A in the Red Sea, finding 50 tons of weapons.
- 2004 – Flash Airlines Flight 604 crashes into the Red Sea, resulting in 148 deaths, making it one of the deadliest aviation accidents in Egyptian history.
- 2009 – The first block of the blockchain of the decentralized payment system Bitcoin, called the Genesis block, is established by the creator of the system, Satoshi Nakamoto.
- 2015 – Boko Haram militants destroy the entire town of Baga in north-east Nigeria, starting the Baga massacre and killing as many as 2,000 people.
- 2016 – In response to the execution of Nimr al-Nimr, Iran ends its diplomatic relations with Saudi Arabia.
- 2018 – For the first time in history, all five major storm surge gates in the Netherlands are closed simultaneously in the wake of a storm.
- 2019 – Chang'e 4 makes the first soft landing on the far side of the Moon, deploying the Yutu-2 lunar rover.
- 2020 – Iranian General Qasem Soleimani is killed by an American airstrike near Baghdad International Airport, igniting global concerns of a potential armed conflict.
- 2023 – Singapore's Jurong Bird Park permanently closes.
- 2024 – At least 91 people are killed in bombings in Kerman, Iran, during a ceremony commemorating the assassination of Iranian General Qasem Soleimani four years earlier.
- 2026 – The United States conducts airstrikes across northern Venezuela, including the capital Caracas and captures Venezuelan president Nicolás Maduro and first lady Cilia Flores.

== Births ==
=== Pre-1600 ===
- 106 BC – Cicero, Roman philosopher, lawyer, and politician (died 43 BC)
- 1509 – Gian Girolamo Albani, Italian cardinal (died 1591)

=== 1601–1900 ===
- 1611 – James Harrington, English political theorist (died 1677)
- 1698 – Pietro Metastasio, Italian poet and songwriter (died 1782)
- 1710 – Richard Gridley, American soldier and engineer (died 1796)
- 1722 – Fredrik Hasselqvist, Swedish biologist and explorer (died 1752)
- 1731 – Angelo Emo, Venetian admiral and statesman (died 1792)
- 1760 – Veerapandiya Kattabomman, Indian ruler (died 1799)
- 1775 – Francis Caulfeild, 2nd Earl of Charlemont (died 1863)
- 1778 – Antoni Melchior Fijałkowski, Polish archbishop (died 1861)
- 1793 – Lucretia Mott, American activist (died 1880)
- 1802 – Charles Pelham Villiers, English lawyer and politician (died 1898)
- 1803 – Douglas William Jerrold, English journalist and playwright (died 1857)
- 1806 – Henriette Sontag, German soprano and actress (died 1854)
- 1810 – Antoine Thomson d'Abbadie, French geographer, ethnologist, linguist, and astronomer (died 1897)
- 1816 – Samuel C. Pomeroy, American businessman and politician (died 1891)
- 1819 – Charles Piazzi Smyth, Italian-Scottish astronomer and academic (died 1900)
- 1831 – Savitribai Phule, Indian poet, educator, and activist (died 1897)
- 1836 – Sakamoto Ryōma, Japanese samurai and rebel leader (died 1867)
- 1840 – Father Damien, Flemish priest and missionary (died 1889)
- 1847 – Ettore Marchiafava, Italian physician (died 1935)
- 1853 – Sophie Elkan, Swedish writer (died 1921)
- 1855 – Hubert Bland, English businessman (died 1914)
- 1861 – Ernest Renshaw, English tennis player (died 1899)
- 1861 – William Renshaw, English tennis player (died 1904)
- 1862 – Matthew Nathan, English soldier and politician, 13th Governor of Queensland (died 1939)
- 1865 – Henry Lytton, English actor (died 1936)
- 1870 – Henry Handel Richardson, Australian-English author (died 1946)
- 1873 – Ichizō Kobayashi, Japanese businessman and art collector, founded the Hankyu Hanshin Holdings (died 1957)
- 1876 – Wilhelm Pieck, German carpenter and politician, 1st President of the German Democratic Republic (died 1960)
- 1877 – Josephine Hull, American actress (died 1957)
- 1880 – Francis Browne, Irish Jesuit priest and photographer (died 1960)
- 1883 – Clement Attlee, English soldier, lawyer, and politician, Prime Minister of the United Kingdom (died 1967)
- 1883 – Duncan Gillis, Canadian discus thrower and hammer thrower (died 1963)
- 1884 – Raoul Koczalski, Polish pianist and composer (died 1948)
- 1885 – Harry Elkins Widener, American businessman (died 1912)
- 1886 – John Gould Fletcher, American poet and author (died 1950)
- 1886 – Arthur Mailey, Australian cricketer (died 1967)
- 1887 – August Macke, German-French painter (died 1914)
- 1892 – J.R.R. Tolkien, English writer, poet, and philologist (died 1973)
- 1894 – ZaSu Pitts, American actress (died 1963)
- 1897 – Eithne Coyle, Irish republican revolutionary, (died 1985)
- 1897 – Marion Davies, American actress and comedian (died 1961)
- 1898 – Carolyn Haywood, American author and illustrator (died 1990)
- 1900 – Donald J. Russell, American businessman (died 1985)

=== 1901–present ===
- 1901 – Ngô Đình Diệm, Vietnamese lawyer and politician, 1st President of the Republic of Vietnam (died 1963)
- 1905 – Dante Giacosa, Italian engineer (died 1996)
- 1905 – Anna May Wong, American actress (died 1961)
- 1906 – Ulyana Barkova, Russian farm worker (died 1991)
- 1907 – Ray Milland, Welsh-American actor and director (died 1986)
- 1909 – Victor Borge, Danish-American pianist and conductor (died 2000)
- 1910 – Frenchy Bordagaray, American baseball player and manager (died 2000)
- 1910 – John Sturges, American director and producer (died 1992)
- 1912 – Federico Borrell García, Spanish soldier (died 1936)
- 1912 – Renaude Lapointe, Canadian journalist and politician (died 2002)
- 1912 – Armand Lohikoski, American-Finnish actor, director, and screenwriter (died 2005)
- 1915 – Jack Levine, American painter and soldier (died 2010)
- 1916 – Betty Furness, American actress and television journalist (died 1994)
- 1916 – Fred Haas, American golfer (died 2004)
- 1917 – Albert Mol, Dutch author and actor (died 2004)
- 1917 – Roger Williams Straus, Jr., American journalist and publisher, co-founded Farrar, Straus and Giroux (died 2004)
- 1919 – Herbie Nichols, American pianist and composer (died 1963)
- 1920 – Siegfried Buback, German lawyer and politician, Attorney General of Germany (died 1977)
- 1921 – Isabella Bashmakova, Russian historian of mathematics (died 2005)
- 1922 – Bill Travers, English actor, director, and screenwriter (died 1994)
- 1923 – Hank Stram, American football coach and sportscaster (died 2005)
- 1924 – Otto Beisheim, German businessman and philanthropist, founded Metro AG (died 2013)
- 1924 – Enzo Cozzolini, Italian football player (died 1962)
- 1924 – André Franquin, Belgian author and illustrator (died 1997)
- 1924 – Nell Rankin, American soprano and educator (died 2005)
- 1925 – Jill Balcon, English actress (died 2009)
- 1926 – W. Michael Blumenthal, American economist and politician, 64th United States Secretary of the Treasury
- 1926 – George Martin, English composer, conductor, and producer (died 2016)
- 1928 – Abdul Rahman Ya'kub, Malaysian lawyer and politician, 3rd Chief Minister of Sarawak (died 2015)
- 1929 – Sergio Leone, Italian director, producer, and screenwriter (died 1989)
- 1929 – Ernst Mahle, German-Brazilian composer and conductor (died 2025)
- 1929 – Gordon Moore, American businessman, co-founder of Intel Corporation (died 2023)
- 1930 – Stephen Fabian, American illustrator (died 2025)
- 1930 – Robert Loggia, American actor and director (died 2015)
- 1932 – Dabney Coleman, American actor (died 2024)
- 1932 – Eeles Landström, Finnish pole vaulter and politician (died 2022)
- 1933 – Geoffrey Bindman, English lawyer (died 2025)
- 1933 – Anne Stevenson, American-English poet and author (died 2020)
- 1933 – Rolf Steiner, German mercenary
- 1934 – Marpessa Dawn, American-French actress, singer, and dancer (died 2008)
- 1934 – Carla Anderson Hills, American lawyer and politician, 5th United States Secretary of Housing and Urban Development
- 1935 – Raymond Garneau, Canadian businessman and politician
- 1937 – Glen A. Larson, American director, producer, and screenwriter, created Battlestar Galactica (died 2014)
- 1938 – Robin Butler, Baron Butler of Brockwell, English academic and politician
- 1938 – K. Ganeshalingam, Sri Lankan accountant and politician, Mayor of Colombo (died 2006)
- 1939 – Arik Einstein, Israeli singer-songwriter and actor (died 2013)
- 1939 – Bobby Hull, Canadian ice hockey player (died 2023)
- 1940 – Bernard Blaut, Polish footballer and coach (died 2007)
- 1940 – Leo de Berardinis, Italian actor and director (died 2008)
- 1941 – Malcolm Dick, New Zealand rugby player
- 1942 – John Marsden, Australian lawyer and activist (died 2006)
- 1942 – John Thaw, English actor and producer, played Inspector Morse (died 2002)
- 1943 – Van Dyke Parks, American singer-songwriter, musician, composer, author, and actor
- 1944 – Blanche d'Alpuget, Australian author
- 1944 – Doreen Massey, English geographer and political activist (died 2016)
- 1945 – Stephen Stills, American singer-songwriter, guitarist, and producer
- 1946 – John Paul Jones, English bass player, songwriter, and producer
- 1946 – Michalis Kritikopoulos, Greek footballer (died 2002)
- 1947 – Fran Cotton, English rugby player
- 1947 – Zulema, American singer-songwriter (died 2013)
- 1948 – Ian Nankervis, Australian footballer
- 1949 – Sylvia Likens, American teenager and murder victim (died 1965)
- 1950 – Victoria Principal, American actress and businesswoman
- 1950 – Linda Steiner, American journalist and academic
- 1950 – Vesna Vulović, Serbian plane crash survivor and Guinness World Record holder (died 2016)
- 1951 – Linda Dobbs, English lawyer and judge
- 1951 – Gary Nairn, Australian surveyor and politician, 14th Special Minister of State (died 2024)
- 1952 – Esperanza Aguirre, Spanish civil servant and politician, 3rd President of the Community of Madrid
- 1952 – Gianfranco Fini, Italian journalist and politician, Italian Minister of Foreign Affairs
- 1952 – Jim Ross, American professional wrestling commentator
- 1953 – Justin Fleming, Australian playwright and author
- 1953 – Mohamed Waheed Hassan, Maldivian educator and politician, 5th President of the Maldives
- 1953 – Peter Taylor, English footballer and manager
- 1955 – Denis Walter, Australian radio host and singer
- 1956 – Mel Gibson, American-Australian actor, director, producer, and screenwriter
- 1957 – Dave Dobbyn, New Zealand singer-songwriter and producer
- 1960 – Russell Spence, English racing driver
- 1962 – Darren Daulton, American baseball player (died 2017)
- 1962 – Gavin Hastings, Scottish rugby player
- 1963 – Stewart Hosie, Scottish businessman and politician
- 1963 – Aamer Malik, Pakistani cricketer
- 1963 – Alex Wheatle, English author and playwright (died 2025)
- 1964 – Cheryl Miller, American basketball player and coach
- 1966 – Chetan Sharma, Indian cricketer
- 1969 – James Carter, American musician
- 1969 – Jarmo Lehtinen, Finnish racing driver
- 1969 – Michael Schumacher, German racing driver
- 1969 – Gerda Weissensteiner, Italian luger and bobsledder
- 1971 – Sarah Alexander, English actress
- 1971 – Cory Cross, Canadian ice hockey player and coach
- 1973 – Dan Harmon, American television writer, producer, animator, and actor
- 1974 – Robert-Jan Derksen, Dutch golfer
- 1974 – Alessandro Petacchi, Italian cyclist
- 1974 – Todd Warriner, Canadian ice hockey player
- 1975 – Thomas Bangalter, French DJ, musician, and producer
- 1975 – Jason Marsden, American actor
- 1975 – Danica McKellar, American actress and mathematician
- 1976 – Angelos Basinas, Greek footballer
- 1976 – Nicholas Gonzalez, American actor and producer
- 1977 – Lee Bowyer, English footballer and coach
- 1977 – A. J. Burnett, American baseball player
- 1978 – Dimitra Kalentzou, Greek basketball player
- 1978 – Kimberley Locke, American singer, songwriter, and television personality
- 1978 – Mike York, American ice hockey player
- 1979 – Kate Levering, American actress, singer, and dancer
- 1980 – Bryan Clay, American decathlete
- 1980 – Eli Crane, U.S. representative for Arizona's 2nd congressional district
- 1980 – Telly Leung, American actor, director, singer and songwriter
- 1980 – Angela Ruggiero, American ice hockey player
- 1980 – David Tyree, American football player
- 1980 – Kurt Vile, American singer-songwriter, guitarist, and producer
- 1980 – Mary Wineberg, American sprinter
- 1981 – Eli Manning, American football player
- 1982 – Peter Clarke, English footballer
- 1982 – Park Ji-yoon, South Korean singer and actress
- 1982 – Lasse Nilsson, Swedish footballer
- 1983 – Katie McGrath, Irish actress
- 1984 – Billy Mehmet, English-Irish footballer
- 1985 – Nicole Beharie, American actress
- 1985 – Linas Kleiza, Lithuanian basketball player
- 1985 – Evan Moore, American football player
- 1985 – Noelle Quinn, American basketball player and coach
- 1986 – Dana Hussain, Iraqi sprinter
- 1986 – Lloyd, American singer-songwriter
- 1986 – Greg Nwokolo, Indonesian footballer
- 1986 – Nikola Peković, Montenegrin basketball player and executive
- 1986 – Cedric Simmons, American-Bulgarian basketball player
- 1986 – Dmitry Starodubtsev, Russian pole vaulter
- 1987 – Adrián, Spanish footballer
- 1987 – Reto Berra, Swiss professional ice hockey goaltender
- 1987 – Kim Ok-vin, South Korean actress and singer
- 1988 – Ikechi Anya, Scottish-Nigerian footballer
- 1988 – The Completionist, American YouTuber
- 1988 – Jonny Evans, Northern Irish footballer
- 1988 – Matt Frattin, Canadian ice hockey player
- 1989 – Jordi Masip, Spanish footballer
- 1989 – Eric Sim, American baseball player and YouTuber
- 1989 – Kōhei Uchimura, Japanese artistic gymnast
- 1990 – Yoichiro Kakitani, Japanese footballer
- 1991 – Jerson Cabral, Dutch footballer
- 1991 – Özgür Çek, Turkish footballer
- 1991 – Ryan Ellis, Canadian ice hockey player
- 1991 – Sébastien Faure, French footballer
- 1991 – Dane Gagai, Australian rugby league player
- 1991 – Goo Hara, South Korean singer and actress (died 2019)
- 1991 – Darius Morris, American basketball player (died 2024)
- 1991 – Joonas Nättinen, Finnish ice hockey player
- 1992 – Doug McDermott, American basketball player
- 1992 – Sio Siua Taukeiaho, New Zealand-Tongan rugby league player
- 1994 – Isaquias Queiroz, Brazilian sprint canoeist
- 1995 – Rondae Hollis-Jefferson, American-Jordanian basketball player
- 1995 – Jisoo, South Korean singer and actress
- 1995 – Paddy Pimblett, English mixed martial artist
- 1995 – Kim Seol-hyun, South Korean singer and actress
- 1995 – Tonny Vilhena, Dutch footballer
- 1996 – Léo Ortiz, Brazilian footballer
- 1996 – Florence Pugh, English actress
- 1997 – Fodé Ballo-Touré, French-Senegalese footballer
- 1997 – Jérémie Boga, French-Ivorian footballer
- 1997 – Kyron McMaster, British Virgin Islands hurdler
- 1998 – Patrick Cutrone, Italian footballer
- 1998 – Emiru, American online streamer
- 2000 – Leandro Barreiro, Luxembourgish footballer
- 2000 – João Mário, Portuguese footballer
- 2001 – Deni Avdija, Israeli-Serbian basketball player
- 2002 – Nico González, Spanish footballer
- 2003 – Kyle Rittenhouse, American conservative personality
- 2003 – Greta Thunberg, Swedish environmental activist
- 2003 – Alan Virginius, French footballer
- 2004 – Carlos Baleba, Cameroonian footballer
- 2004 – Toby Collyer, English footballer
- 2004 – Habib Diarra, Senegalese footballer
- 2008 – Raegan Revord, American actor

== Deaths ==
=== Pre-1600 ===
- 236 – Anterus, pope of the Catholic Church
- 323 – Emperor Yuan of Jin, Chinese emperor (born 276)
- 1028 – Fujiwara no Yukinari, Japanese calligrapher (born 972)
- 1028 – Fujiwara no Michinaga, Japanese nobleman (born 966)
- 1098 – Walkelin, Norman bishop of Winchester
- 1322 – Philip V, king of France (born 1292)
- 1437 – Catherine of Valois, Queen Consort of Henry V (born 1401)
- 1501 – Ali-Shir Nava'i, Turkic poet, linguist, and mystic (born 1441)
- 1543 – Juan Rodríguez Cabrillo, Portuguese explorer and navigator (born 1499)
- 1571 – Joachim II Hector, Elector of Brandenburg (born 1505)

=== 1601–1900 ===
- 1641 – Jeremiah Horrocks, English astronomer and mathematician (born 1618)
- 1656 – Mathieu Molé, French politician (born 1584)
- 1670 – George Monck, 1st Duke of Albemarle, English general and politician, Lord Lieutenant of Ireland (born 1608)
- 1701 – Louis I, prince of Monaco (born 1642)
- 1705 – Luca Giordano, Italian painter and illustrator (born 1634)
- 1743 – Ferdinando Galli-Bibiena, Italian painter and architect (born 1657)
- 1785 – Baldassare Galuppi, Italian composer (born 1706)
- 1795 – Josiah Wedgwood, English potter, founded the Wedgwood Company (born 1730)
- 1826 – Louis-Gabriel Suchet, French general (born 1770)
- 1871 – Kuriakose Elias Chavara, Indian priest and saint (born 1805)
- 1875 – Pierre Larousse, French lexicographer and publisher (born 1817)
- 1882 – William Harrison Ainsworth, English author (born 1805)
- 1895 – James Merritt Ives, American lithographer and businessman, co-founded Currier and Ives (born 1824)

=== 1901–present ===
- 1903 – Alois Hitler, Austrian civil servant (born 1837)
- 1911 – Alexandros Papadiamantis, Greek author and poet (born 1851)
- 1915 – James Elroy Flecker, English poet, author, and playwright (born 1884)
- 1916 – Grenville M. Dodge, American general and politician (born 1831)
- 1923 – Jaroslav Hašek, Czech journalist and author (born 1883)
- 1927 – Carl David Tolmé Runge, German physicist and mathematician (born 1856)
- 1931 – Joseph Joffre, French general (born 1852)
- 1933 – Wilhelm Cuno, German lawyer and politician, Chancellor of Germany (born 1876)
- 1933 – Jack Pickford, Canadian-American actor, director, and producer (born 1896)
- 1943 – Walter James, Australian lawyer and politician, 5th Premier of Western Australia (born 1863)
- 1944 – Jurgis Baltrušaitis, Lithuanian poet, critic, and translator (born 1873)
- 1945 – Edgar Cayce, American psychic and author (born 1877)
- 1946 – William Joyce, American-British pro-Axis propaganda broadcaster (born 1906)
- 1956 – Alexander Gretchaninov, Russian-American pianist and composer (born 1864)
- 1956 – Dimitrios Vergos, Greek Olympian (born 1886)
- 1956 – Joseph Wirth, German educator and politician, Chancellor of Germany (born 1879)
- 1959 – Edwin Muir, Scottish poet, author, and translator (born 1887)
- 1960 – Eric P. Kelly, American journalist, author, and academic (born 1884)
- 1965 – Milton Avery, American painter (born 1885)
- 1966 – Sammy Younge Jr., American civil rights activist (born 1944)
- 1967 – Mary Garden, Scottish-American soprano and actress (born 1874)
- 1967 – Reginald Punnett, British scientist (born 1875)
- 1967 – Jack Ruby, American businessman and murderer (born 1911)
- 1970 – Gladys Aylward, English missionary and humanitarian (born 1902)
- 1975 – Victor Kraft, Austrian philosopher from the Vienna Circle (born 1880)
- 1979 – Conrad Hilton, American businessman, founded the Hilton Hotels & Resorts (born 1887)
- 1980 – Joy Adamson, Austrian-Kenyan painter and conservationist (born 1910)
- 1980 – George Sutherland Fraser, Scottish poet and academic (born 1915)
- 1981 – Princess Alice, Countess of Athlone (born 1883)
- 1988 – Rose Ausländer, Ukrainian-German poet and author (born 1901)
- 1989 – Sergei Sobolev, Russian mathematician and academic (born 1909)
- 1992 – Judith Anderson, Australian actress (born 1897)
- 2002 – Satish Dhawan, Indian engineer (born 1920)
- 2003 – Sid Gillman, American football player and coach (born 1911)
- 2004 – Des Corcoran, Australian politician, 37th Premier of South Australia (born 1928)
- 2005 – Koo Chen-fu, Taiwanese businessman and diplomat (born 1917)
- 2005 – Egidio Galea, Maltese Roman Catholic priest, missionary, and educator (born 1918)
- 2005 – Jyotindra Nath Dixit, Indian diplomat, 2nd Indian National Security Adviser (born 1936)
- 2006 – Bill Skate, Papua New Guinean politician, 5th Prime Minister of Papua New Guinea (born 1954)
- 2007 – William Verity, Jr., American businessman and politician, 27th United States Secretary of Commerce (born 1917)
- 2008 – Jimmy Stewart, Scottish racing driver (born 1931)
- 2008 – Choi Yo-sam, South Korean boxer (born 1972)
- 2009 – Betty Freeman, American philanthropist and photographer (born 1921)
- 2009 – Pat Hingle, American actor (born 1923)
- 2009 – Hisayasu Nagata, Japanese politician (born 1969)
- 2010 – Gustavo Becerra-Schmidt, Chilean-German composer and academic (born 1925)
- 2010 – Mary Daly, American theologian and scholar (born 1928)
- 2012 – Vicar, Chilean cartoonist (born 1934)
- 2012 – Robert L. Carter, American lawyer and judge (born 1917)
- 2012 – Winifred Milius Lubell, American author and illustrator (born 1914)
- 2012 – Josef Škvorecký, Czech-Canadian author and publisher (born 1924)
- 2013 – Alfie Fripp, English soldier and pilot (born 1913)
- 2013 – Ivan Mackerle, Czech cryptozoologist, explorer, and author (born 1942)
- 2013 – William Maxson, American general (born 1930)
- 2013 – Sergiu Nicolaescu, Romanian actor, director, and screenwriter (born 1930)
- 2014 – Phil Everly, American singer and guitarist (born 1939)
- 2014 – George Goodman, American economist and author (born 1930)
- 2014 – Saul Zaentz, American film producer (born 1921)
- 2015 – Martin Anderson, American economist and academic (born 1936)
- 2015 – Edward Brooke, American captain and politician, 47th Massachusetts Attorney General (born 1919)
- 2016 – Paul Bley, Canadian-American pianist and composer (born 1932)
- 2016 – Peter Naur, Danish computer scientist, astronomer, and academic (born 1928)
- 2016 – Bill Plager, Canadian ice hockey player and coach (born 1945)
- 2016 – Igor Sergun, Russian general and diplomat (born 1957)
- 2017 – H. S. Mahadeva Prasad, Indian politician (born 1958)
- 2018 – Colin Brumby, Australian composer (born 1933)
- 2019 – Herb Kelleher, American businessman, co-founder of Southwest Airlines (born 1931)
- 2020 – Qasem Soleimani, Iranian major general, commander of the Iranian Quds Force (born 1957)
- 2021 – Eric Jerome Dickey, American author (born 1961)
- 2023 – Elena Huelva, Spanish cancer activist and influencer (born 2002)
- 2025 – Jeff Baena, American filmmaker (born 1977)
- 2025 – Brenton Wood, American R&B singer-songwriter and keyboard player (born 1941)
- 2025 – Niko Lekishvili, Georgian politician (born 1947)

== Holidays and observances ==
- Christian feast day:
  - Daniel of Padua
  - Genevieve
  - Holy Name of Jesus
  - Kuriakose Elias Chavara (Syro-Malabar Catholic Church)
  - Pope Anterus
  - January 3 (Eastern Orthodox liturgics)
- Tamaseseri Festival (Hakozaki Shrine, Fukuoka, Japan)
- The tenth of the Twelve Days of Christmas (Western Christianity)
