= February 9 =

February 9 this year in various calendars
- Monday, 9 February 2026
Akan	Monodwo
Armenian	24 Mehekani 1475
Aztec	Etzalcualiztli 10, 5 Tecpatl
Babylonian	20 Tebetu, 2336 SE
Balinese pawukon	Luang, Pepet, Kajeng, Laba, Paing, Maulu, Coma of Menail, Indra, Dadi, Duka
Bengali	26 Magh, BS 1432
Chinese	Yang Wood Tiger・Heart Mansion; Wood Snake Year, Month 12, Day 22 (Lichun, 9 days until Yushui)
Common Era	9 February 2026 CE
Coptic	2 Meshir, AM 1742
Egyptian	29 Payni, 2774 NE
Ethiopian	2 Yakātit, 2018 Amätä Məhrät
French Republican	Décade III, Primidi de Pluviôse de l'Année 234 de la République
Gregorian	9 February, AD 2026
Hebrew	22 Shevat, AM 5786
Hindu	Viśākhā・Gaṇḍa; Solar: 27 Māgha, 1947 SE; Lunisolar: Aṣṭamī, Kṛishna pakṣa of Māgha, 2082 VE; Siddhārthin・5126 KY・1,872,615
Icelandic	Mánudagur, 18 Þorri 2025
Islamic	21 Sha'aban, AH 1447 (using tabular method)
ISO week date	2026-W07-1
Japanese	22 Shiwasu, Reiwa 8 (Risshun, 10 days until Usui)
Julian	27 January, AD 2026 (AM 7534)
Julian day	2461081
Korean	22 Sodal, 4358 DE
Maya	13.0.13.5.18; 16 Pax, 5 Etznab
Roman	ante diem VI Kalendas Februarias, MMDCCLXXIX AUC
Solar Hijri	20 Bahman, SH 1404
Tibetan	23 rgyal, shing mo sbrul 2152 or 1771 or 999

<<	February					>>
Su	Mo	Tu	We	Th	Fr	Sa
1	2	3	4	5	6	7
8	9	10	11	12	13	14
15	16	17	18	19	20	21
22	23	24	25	26	27	28
2026

February 9 in recent years
2026 (Monday)
2025 (Sunday)
2024 (Friday)
2023 (Thursday)
2022 (Wednesday)
2021 (Tuesday)
2020 (Sunday)
2019 (Saturday)
2018 (Friday)
2017 (Thursday)

February 9 is the 40th day of the year in the Gregorian calendar; 325 days remain until the end of the year (326 in leap years).

== Events ==
=== Pre-1600 ===
- 474 – Zeno is crowned as co-emperor of the Eastern Roman Empire.
- 1003 – Boleslaus III is restored to authority with armed support from Bolesław I the Brave of Poland.
- 1098 – A First Crusade army led by Bohemond of Taranto wins a major battle against the Seljuq emir Ridwan of Aleppo during the siege of Antioch.
- 1539 – The first recorded race is held on Chester Racecourse, known as the Roodee.
- 1555 – Bishop of Gloucester John Hooper is burned at the stake.

=== 1601–1900 ===
- 1621 – Gregory XV becomes Pope, the last Pope elected by acclamation.
- 1654 – The Capture of Fort Rocher takes place during the Anglo-Spanish War.
- 1775 – American Revolutionary War: The British Parliament declares Massachusetts in rebellion.
- 1778 – Rhode Island becomes the fourth US state to ratify the Articles of Confederation.
- 1822 – Haiti attacks the newly established Dominican Republic on the other side of the island of Hispaniola.
- 1825 – After no candidate receives a majority of electoral votes in the US presidential election of 1824, the United States House of Representatives elects John Quincy Adams as sixth President of the United States in a contingent election.
- 1849 – The new Roman Republic is declared.
- 1861 – American Civil War: Jefferson Davis is elected the Provisional President of the Confederate States of America by the Provisional Confederate Congress at Montgomery, Alabama.
- 1870 – US president Ulysses S. Grant signs a joint resolution of Congress establishing the U.S. Weather Bureau.
- 1889 – US president Grover Cleveland signs a bill elevating the United States Department of Agriculture to a Cabinet-level agency.
- 1893 – Verdi's last opera, Falstaff, premieres at La Scala, Milan.
- 1895 – William G. Morgan creates a game called Mintonette, which soon comes to be referred to as volleyball.
- 1900 – The Davis Cup competition is established.

=== 1901–present ===
- 1904 – Russo-Japanese War: Battle of Port Arthur concludes.
- 1907 – The Mud March is the first large procession organised by the National Union of Women's Suffrage Societies (NUWSS).
- 1913 – A group of meteors is visible across much of the eastern seaboard of the Americas, leading astronomers to conclude the source had been a small, short-lived natural satellite of the Earth.
- 1920 – Under the terms of the Svalbard Treaty, international diplomacy recognizes Norwegian sovereignty over Arctic archipelago Svalbard, and designates it as demilitarized.
- 1922 – Brazil becomes a member of the Berne Convention copyright treaty.
- 1929 – Members of the Việt Nam Quốc Dân Đảng assassinate the labor recruiter Bazin, prompting a crackdown by French colonial authorities.
- 1932 – Prohibition law is abolished in Finland after a national referendum, where 70% voted for a repeal of the law.
- 1934 – The Balkan Entente is formed between Greece, Romania, Yugoslavia, and Turkey.
- 1941 – World War II: Bombing of Genoa: The Cathedral of San Lorenzo in Genoa, Italy, is struck by a bomb which fails to detonate.
- 1942 – Year-round Daylight saving time (aka War Time) is reinstated in the United States as a wartime measure to help conserve energy resources.
- 1943 – World War II: Pacific War: Allied authorities declare Guadalcanal secure after Imperial Japan evacuates its remaining forces from the island, ending the Battle of Guadalcanal.
- 1945 – World War II: Battle of the Atlantic: HMS Venturer sinks U-864 off the coast of Fedje, Norway, in a rare instance of submarine-to-submarine combat.
- 1945 – World War II: A force of Allied aircraft unsuccessfully attack a German destroyer in Førdefjorden, Norway.
- 1950 – Second Red Scare: US Senator Joseph McCarthy accuses the United States Department of State of being filled with Communists.
- 1951 – Korean War: The two-day Geochang massacre begins as a battalion of the 11th Division of the South Korean Army kills 719 unarmed citizens in Geochang, in the South Gyeongsang district of South Korea.
- 1959 – The R-7 Semyorka, the first intercontinental ballistic missile, becomes operational at Plesetsk, USSR.
- 1961 – The Beatles at the Cavern Club: Lunchtime – The Beatles perform under this name at The Cavern Club for the first time following their return to Liverpool from Hamburg.
- 1964 – The Beatles make their first appearance on The Ed Sullivan Show, performing before a record-setting audience of 73 million viewers across the United States.
- 1965 – Vietnam War: The United States Marine Corps sends a MIM-23 Hawk missile battalion to South Vietnam, the first American troops in-country without an official advisory or training mission.
- 1971 – The 6.5–6.7 M_{w} Sylmar earthquake hits the Greater Los Angeles Area with a maximum Mercalli intensity of XI (Extreme), killing 64 and injuring 2,000.
- 1971 – Satchel Paige becomes the first Negro league player to be voted into the USA's Baseball Hall of Fame.
- 1971 – Apollo program: Apollo 14 returns to Earth after the third human Moon landing.
- 1975 – The Soyuz 17 Soviet spacecraft returns to Earth.
- 1976 – Aeroflot Flight 3739, a Tupolev Tu-104, crashes during takeoff from Irkutsk Airport, killing 24.
- 1978 – The Budd Company unveils its first SPV-2000 self-propelled railcar in Philadelphia, Pennsylvania.
- 1982 – Japan Air Lines Flight 350 crashes near Haneda Airport in an attempted pilot mass murder-suicide, killing 24 of the 174 people on board.
- 1986 – Halley's Comet last appeared in the inner Solar System.
- 1987 – Civil unrest broke out across Palestine.
- 1991 – Dissolution of the Soviet Union: Voters in Lithuania vote for independence from the Soviet Union.
- 1996 – The Provisional Irish Republican Army declares the end to its 18-month ceasefire and explodes a large bomb in London's Canary Wharf, killing two people.
- 1996 – Copernicium is discovered by Sigurd Hofmann, Victor Ninov et al.
- 2001 – The Ehime Maru and USS Greeneville collision takes place, killing nine of the thirty-five people on board the Japanese fishery high-school training ship Ehime Maru, leaving the USS Greeneville (SSN-772) with US $2 million in repairs, at Pearl Harbor.
- 2016 – Two passenger trains collide in the German town of Bad Aibling in the state of Bavaria. Twelve people die and 85 others are injured.
- 2018 – Winter Olympics: Opening ceremony is performed in Pyeongchang County in South Korea.
- 2020 – Salvadoran President Nayib Bukele has the army soldiers enter the Legislative Assembly to assist in pushing for the approval for a better government security plan, causing a brief political crisis.
- 2021 – Second impeachment trial of Donald Trump begins.
- 2025 – The Baltic states synchronize their electric power transmission infrastructure with the Continental Europe Synchronous Area (CESA), in objective to disconnect from the Russo-Belarussian agreement to use the IPS/UPS system.

== Births ==
=== Pre-1600 ===
- 1060 – Honorius II, pope of the Catholic Church (died 1130)
- 1274 – Louis of Toulouse, French bishop (died 1297)
- 1313 – Maria of Portugal, Queen of Castile, Portuguese infanta (died 1357)
- 1344 – Meinhard III, count of Tyrol (died 1363)
- 1441 – Ali-Shir Nava'i, Turkic poet, linguist, and painter (died 1501)
- 1533 – Shimazu Yoshihisa, Japanese daimyō (died 1611)
- 1579 – Johannes Meursius, Dutch classical scholar (died 1639)

=== 1601–1900 ===
- 1651 – Procopio Cutò, French entrepreneur (died 1727)
- 1666 – George Hamilton, 1st Earl of Orkney, Scottish field marshal (died 1737)
- 1711 – Luis Vicente de Velasco e Isla, Spanish sailor and commander (died 1762)
- 1737 – Thomas Paine, English-American philosopher, author, and activist (died 1809)
- 1741 – Henri-Joseph Rigel, German-French composer (died 1799)
- 1748 – Sir John Duckworth, 1st Baronet, English admiral and politician, Commodore Governor of Newfoundland (died 1817)
- 1763 – Louis I, Grand Duke of Baden (died 1830)
- 1769 – George W. Campbell, Scottish-American lawyer and politician, 5th United States Secretary of the Treasury (died 1848)
- 1773 – William Henry Harrison, American general and politician, 9th President of the United States (died 1841)
- 1775 – Farkas Bolyai, Hungarian mathematician and academic (died 1856)
- 1781 – Johann Baptist von Spix, German biologist and explorer (died 1826)
- 1783 – Vasily Zhukovsky, Russian poet and translator (died 1852)
- 1789 – Franz Xaver Gabelsberger, German engineer, invented Gabelsberger shorthand (died 1849)
- 1800 – Hyrum Smith, American religious leader (died 1844)
- 1814 – Samuel J. Tilden, American lawyer and politician, 28th Governor of New York (died 1886)
- 1815 – Federico de Madrazo, Spanish painter (died 1894)
- 1826 – Keʻelikōlani, Hawaiian royal and governor (died 1883)
- 1830 – Abdülaziz, Ottoman Sultan and Caliph (died 1876)
- 1834 – Felix Dahn, German lawyer, historian, and author (died 1912)
- 1837 – José Burgos, Filipino priest and revolutionary (died 1872)
- 1839 – Silas Adams, American colonel, lawyer, and politician (died 1896)
- 1846 – Wilhelm Maybach, German engineer and businessman, founded Maybach (died 1929)
- 1846 – Whitaker Wright, English businessman and financier (died 1904)
- 1847 – Hugh Price Hughes, Welsh-English clergyman and theologian (died 1902)
- 1854 – Aletta Jacobs, Dutch physician and suffrage activist (died 1929)
- 1856 – Hara Takashi, Japanese politician, 10th Prime Minister of Japan (died 1921)
- 1859 – Akiyama Yoshifuru, Japanese general (died 1930)
- 1863 – Anthony Hope, English author and playwright (died 1933)
- 1864 – Miina Härma, Estonian organist, composer, and conductor (died 1941)
- 1865 – Mrs. Patrick Campbell, English-French actress (died 1940)
- 1865 – Erich von Drygalski, German geographer and geophysicist (died 1949)
- 1867 – Natsume Sōseki, Japanese author and poet (died 1916)
- 1871 – Howard Taylor Ricketts, American pathologist and physician (died 1910)
- 1874 – Amy Lowell, American poet, critic, and educator (died 1925)
- 1876 – Arthur Edward Moore, New Zealand-Australian politician, 23rd Premier of Queensland (died 1963)
- 1878 – Jack Kirwan, Irish international footballer (died 1959)
- 1880 – Lipót Fejér, Hungarian mathematician and academic (died 1959)
- 1883 – Jules Berry, French actor and director (died 1951)
- 1885 – Alban Berg, Austrian composer and educator (died 1935)
- 1885 – Clarence H. Haring, American historian and author (died 1960)
- 1889 – Larry Semon, American actor, producer, director and screenwriter (died 1928)
- 1891 – Ronald Colman, English-American actor (died 1958)
- 1891 – Kristian Krefting, Norwegian footballer and chemical engineer (died 1964)
- 1891 – Pietro Nenni, Italian journalist and politician, Secretary of the Italian Socialist Party (died 1980)
- 1892 – Peggy Wood, American actress (died 1978)
- 1893 – Georgios Athanasiadis-Novas, Greek lawyer and politician, 163rd Prime Minister of Greece (died 1987)
- 1895 – Hermann Brill, German lawyer and politician, 8th Minister-President of Thuringia (died 1959)
- 1896 – Alberto Vargas, Peruvian-American painter and illustrator (died 1982)
- 1897 – Charles Kingsford Smith, Australian captain and pilot (died 1935)
- 1898 – Jūkichi Yagi, Japanese poet and educator (died 1927)

=== 1901–present ===
- 1901 – Brian Donlevy, American actor (died 1972)
- 1901 – James Murray, American actor (died 1936)
- 1905 – David Cecil, 6th Marquess of Exeter, English hurdler and politician (died 1981)
- 1906 – André Kostolany, Hungarian-French economist and journalist (died 1999)
- 1907 – Trường Chinh, Vietnamese politician, 4th President of Vietnam (died 1988)
- 1907 – Dit Clapper, Canadian ice hockey player and coach (died 1978)
- 1907 – Harold Scott MacDonald Coxeter, English-Canadian mathematician and academic (died 2003)
- 1909 – Marjorie Ogilvie Anderson, Scottish historian (died 2002)
- 1909 – Heather Angel, English-American actress (died 1986)
- 1909 – Carmen Miranda, Portuguese-Brazilian actress, singer, and dancer (died 1955)
- 1909 – Dean Rusk, American colonel and politician, 54th United States Secretary of State (died 1994)
- 1910 – Jacques Monod, French biochemist and geneticist, Nobel Prize laureate (died 1976)
- 1911 – William Orlando Darby, American general (died 1945)
- 1911 – Esa Pakarinen, Finnish actor and musician (died 1989)
- 1912 – Ginette Leclerc, French actress (died 1992)
- 1912 – Futabayama Sadaji, Japanese sumo wrestler, the 35th Yokozuna (died 1968)
- 1914 – Ernest Tubb, American singer-songwriter and guitarist (died 1984)
- 1916 – Tex Hughson, American baseball player (died 1993)
- 1918 – Lloyd Noel Ferguson, American chemist (died 2011)
- 1919 – John Abramovic, American basketball player (died 2000)
- 1920 – Fred Allen, New Zealand rugby player and coach (died 2012)
- 1920 – Enrico Schiavetti, Italian football player (died 1993)
- 1922 – Kathryn Grayson, American actress and soprano (died 2010)
- 1922 – Jim Laker, English cricketer and broadcaster (died 1986)
- 1922 – C. P. Krishnan Nair, Indian businessman, founded The Leela Palaces, Hotels and Resorts (died 2014)
- 1922 – Robert E. Ogren, American zoologist (died 2005)
- 1923 – Brendan Behan, Irish rebel, poet, and playwright (died 1964)
- 1923 – Tonie Nathan, American radio host, producer, and politician (died 2014)
- 1925 – John B. Cobb, American philosopher and theologian (died 2024)
- 1925 – Burkhard Heim, German physicist and academic (died 2001)
- 1926 – Garret FitzGerald, Irish lawyer and politician, 7th Taoiseach of Ireland (died 2011)
- 1927 – Richard A. Long, American historian and author (died 2013)
- 1928 – Frank Frazetta, American painter and illustrator (died 2010)
- 1928 – Rinus Michels, Dutch footballer and coach (died 2005)
- 1928 – Roger Mudd, American journalist (died 2021)
- 1929 – A. R. Antulay, Indian social worker and politician, 8th Chief Minister of Maharashtra (died 2014)
- 1929 – Clement Meadmore, Australian-American sculptor (died 2005)
- 1930 – Garner Ted Armstrong, American evangelist and author (died 2003)
- 1931 – Thomas Bernhard, Austrian author, poet, and playwright (died 1989)
- 1931 – Josef Masopust, Czech footballer and coach (died 2015)
- 1931 – Robert Morris, American sculptor and painter (died 2018)
- 1932 – Tatsuro Hirooka, Japanese baseball player and manager
- 1932 – Gerhard Richter, German painter and photographer
- 1935 – Lionel Fanthorpe, English-Welsh priest, journalist, and author
- 1936 – Callistus Ndlovu, Zimbabwean academic and politician (died 2019)
- 1936 – Clive Swift, English actor and singer-songwriter (died 2019)
- 1936 – Stompin' Tom Connors, Canadian country and folk singer-songwriter (died 2013)
- 1937 – Clete Boyer, American baseball player and manager (died 2007)
- 1937 – Fazle Haque, Bengali state minister
- 1937 – Alan Rothwell, English actor (died 2026)
- 1938 – Raul Martirez, Filipino Roman Catholic prelate (died 2024)
- 1939 – Mahala Andrews, English vertebrae palaeontologist (died 1997)
- 1939 – Barry Mann, American pianist, songwriter, and producer
- 1939 – Janet Suzman, South African-British actress and director
- 1940 – Brian Bennett, English drummer and songwriter
- 1940 – J. M. Coetzee, South African-Australian novelist, essayist, and linguist, Nobel Prize laureate
- 1941 – Kermit Gosnell, American abortionist and serial killer
- 1941 – Sheila Kuehl, American actress, lawyer, gay rights activist, and politician
- 1942 – Carole King, American singer-songwriter and pianist
- 1943 – Barbara Lewis, American singer-songwriter
- 1943 – Joe Pesci, American actor
- 1943 – Joseph Stiglitz, American economist and academic, Nobel Prize laureate
- 1944 – Derryn Hinch, New Zealand-born Australian radio and television host (died 2026)
- 1944 – Alice Walker, American novelist, short story writer, and poet
- 1945 – Bill Bergey, American football player (died 2024)
- 1945 – Mia Farrow, American actress, activist, and model
- 1945 – Yoshinori Ohsumi, Japanese biologist, 2016 Nobel Prize Laureate in Physiology or Medicine
- 1945 – Carol Wood, American mathematician and academic
- 1946 – Bob Eastwood, American golfer
- 1946 – Vince Papale, American football player and sportscaster
- 1946 – Jim Webb, American captain and politician, 18th United States Secretary of the Navy
- 1947 – Carla Del Ponte, Swiss lawyer and diplomat
- 1947 – Joe Ely, American singer-songwriter and guitarist (died 2025)
- 1947 – Major Harris, American singer (died 2012)
- 1947 – Alexis Smirnoff, Canadian-American wrestler and actor (died 2019)
- 1948 – Guy Standing, English economist and academic
- 1949 – Bernard Gallacher, Scottish golfer and journalist
- 1949 – Judith Light, American actress
- 1949 – Marcia Garbey, Cuba's first Olympic long jump finalist (died 2024)
- 1950 – Richard F. Colburn, American sergeant and politician
- 1951 – David Pomeranz, American singer, musician, and composer
- 1952 – Danny White, American football player and sportscaster
- 1953 – Ciarán Hinds, Irish actor
- 1953 – Ezechiele Ramin, Italian missionary, priest, and martyr (died 1985)
- 1953 – Gabriel Rotello, American journalist and author, founded OutWeek
- 1954 – Jo Duffy, American author
- 1954 – Chris Gardner, American businessman and philanthropist
- 1954 – Kevin Warwick, English scientist
- 1955 – Jerry Beck, American historian and author
- 1955 – Jimmy Pursey, English singer-songwriter and producer
- 1955 – Charles Shaughnessy, English actor
- 1956 – Phil Ford, American basketball player and coach
- 1956 – Mookie Wilson, American baseball player and coach
- 1957 – Terry McAuliffe, American businessman and politician, 72nd Governor of Virginia
- 1957 – Gordon Strachan, Scottish footballer and manager
- 1958 – Sandy Lyle, Scottish golfer
- 1958 – Chris Nilan, American ice hockey player, coach, and radio host
- 1960 – Holly Johnson, English singer-songwriter and bass player
- 1960 – David Simon, American journalist, author, screenwriter, and television producer
- 1960 – Peggy Whitson, American biochemist and astronaut
- 1961 – John Kruk, American baseball player and sportscaster
- 1962 – Anik Bissonnette, Canadian ballerina
- 1963 – Brian Greene, American physicist
- 1963 – Peter Rowsthorn, Australian comedian and actor
- 1963 – Travis Tritt, American singer-songwriter, guitarist, and actor
- 1964 – Debrah Miceli ("Madusa"), Italian-American wrestler and manager
- 1964 – Dewi Morris, English rugby player
- 1964 – Ernesto Valverde, Spanish footballer and manager
- 1964 – Lars Grael, Brazilian sailor
- 1965 – Dieter Baumann, German runner
- 1965 – Julie Warner, American actress
- 1966 – Harald Eia, Norwegian comedian, actor, and screenwriter
- 1967 – Gaston Browne, Antiguan and Barbudan Prime Minister
- 1967 – Venus Lacy, American basketball player
- 1967 – Todd Pratt, American baseball player and coach
- 1967 – Dan Shulman, Canadian sportscaster
- 1968 – Alejandra Guzmán, Mexican singer-songwriter and actress
- 1968 – Derek Strong, American basketball player and race car driver
- 1968 – Gloria Trevi, Mexican singer and actress
- 1969 – Jimmy Smith, American football player
- 1970 – Glenn McGrath, Australian cricketer and sportscaster
- 1971 – Sharon Case, American actress and model
- 1971 – Matt Gogel, American golfer
- 1971 – Johan Mjällby, Swedish footballer and manager
- 1972 – Darren Ferguson, Scottish footballer and manager
- 1972 – Jason Winston George, American actor and model
- 1973 – Svetlana Boginskaya, Belarusian gymnast
- 1973 – Colin Egglesfield, American actor
- 1973 – Makoto Shinkai, Japanese animator, director, and screenwriter
- 1974 – Jordi Cruyff, Dutch footballer and manager
- 1974 – Brad Maynard, American football player
- 1974 – Amber Valletta, American model
- 1974 – John Wallace, American basketball player and coach
- 1975 – Kurt Asle Arvesen, Norwegian cyclist and coach
- 1975 – Clinton Grybas, Australian journalist and sportscaster (died 2008)
- 1975 – Vladimir Guerrero, Dominican-American baseball player
- 1976 – Charlie Day, American actor, producer, and screenwriter
- 1977 – A. J. Buckley, Irish-Canadian actor, director, and screenwriter
- 1979 – Akinori Iwamura, Japanese baseball player
- 1979 – Irina Slutskaya, Russian figure skater
- 1979 – Zhang Ziyi, Chinese actress and model
- 1980 – Angelos Charisteas, Greek footballer
- 1980 – Margarita Levieva, Russian-American actress
- 1980 – Manu Raju, American journalist
- 1981 – Tom Hiddleston, English actor
- 1981 – John Walker Lindh, American Taliban member
- 1981 – Daisuke Sekimoto, Japanese wrestler
- 1981 – The Rev, American musician (died 2009)
- 1982 – Domingo Cisma, Spanish footballer
- 1982 – Jameer Nelson, American basketball player
- 1982 – Ami Suzuki, Japanese singer-songwriter and actress
- 1982 – Chris Weale, English footballer and manager
- 1983 – Mikel Arruabarrena, Spanish footballer
- 1984 – Maurice Ager, American basketball player, singer, and producer
- 1984 – Dioner Navarro, Venezuelan baseball player
- 1984 – Shōhōzan Yūya, Japanese sumo wrestler
- 1985 – Nigel Dawes, Canadian-Kazakhstani ice hockey player
- 1985 – David Gallagher, American actor
- 1987 – Michael B. Jordan, American actor
- 1987 – Davide Lanzafame, Italian footballer
- 1987 – Rose Leslie, Scottish actress
- 1987 – Magdalena Neuner, German biathlete
- 1989 – Maxime Dufour-Lapointe, Canadian skier
- 1990 – Randall Delgado, Panamanian baseball player
- 1990 – Tariq Sims, Australian-Fijian rugby league player
- 1990 – Camille Winbush, American actress
- 1991 – Helena Kmieć, Polish Roman Catholic missionary (died 2017)
- 1991 – Logan Ryan, American football player
- 1992 – Avan Jogia, Canadian actor
- 1993 – Wataru Endo, Japanese footballer
- 1993 – K. J. McDaniels, American basketball player
- 1993 – Despina Papamichail, Greek tennis player
- 1993 – Niclas Füllkrug, German footballer
- 1995 – André Burakovsky, Swedish ice hockey player
- 1995 – Mario Pašalić, Croatian footballer
- 1995 – Sheraldo Becker, Surinamese footballer
- 1996 – Jimmy Bennett, American actor
- 1996 – Kelli Berglund, American actress
- 1996 – Chung Ha, South Korean singer
- 1996 – Sebastián Driussi, Argentinian footballer
- 1997 – Jaire Alexander, American football player
- 1997 – Saquon Barkley, American football player
- 1997 – Valentini Grammatikopoulou, Greek tennis player
- 1998 – Cem Bölükbaşı, Turkish racing driver and former sim racer
- 1998 – Isabella Gomez, Colombian-American actress
- 2001 – Dylan Cozens, Canadian ice hockey player
- 2002 – Jalen Green, American basketball player
- 2003 – Cooper DeJean, American football player
- 2007 – Ryan Coleman-Williams, American football player

== Deaths ==
=== Pre-1600 ===
- 966 – Ono no Michikaze, Japanese calligrapher (born 894)
- 967 – Sayf al-Dawla, emir of Aleppo (born 916)
- 978 – Luitgarde, duchess consort of Normandy
- 1011 – Bernard I, Duke of Saxony
- 1014 – Yang Yanzhao, Chinese general
- 1135 – Tai Zong, Chinese emperor (born 1075)
- 1199 – Minamoto no Yoritomo, Japanese shōgun (born 1147)
- 1251 – Matthias II, duke of Lorraine
- 1407 – William I, margrave of Meissen (born 1343)
- 1450 – Agnès Sorel, French mistress of Charles VII of France (born 1421)
- 1555 – John Hooper, English bishop and martyr (born 1495)
- 1555 – Rowland Taylor, English priest and martyr (born 1510)
- 1588 – Álvaro de Bazán, 1st Marquis of Santa Cruz, Spanish admiral (born 1526)
- 1600 – John Frederick, Duke of Pomerania (born 1542)

=== 1601–1900 ===
- 1619 – Lucilio Vanini, Italian physician and philosopher (born 1585)
- 1670 – Frederick III of Denmark (born 1609)
- 1675 – Gerrit Dou, Dutch painter (born 1613)
- 1709 – François Louis, Prince of Conti (born 1664)
- 1777 – Seth Pomeroy, American general and gunsmith (born 1706)
- 1803 – Jean François de Saint-Lambert, French soldier, poet, and philosopher (born 1716)
- 1857 – Dionysios Solomos, Greek poet and translator (born 1798)
- 1874 – Jules Michelet, French historian, philosopher, and academic (born 1798)
- 1881 – Fyodor Dostoyevsky, Russian novelist, short story writer, essayist, and philosopher (born 1821)
- 1891 – Johan Jongkind, Dutch painter (born 1819)

=== 1901–present ===
- 1903 – Charles Gavan Duffy, Irish-Australian politician, 8th Premier of Victoria (born 1816)
- 1906 – Paul Laurence Dunbar, American author, poet, and playwright (born 1872)
- 1928 – William Gillies, Australian politician, 21st Premier of Queensland (born 1868)
- 1930 – Richard With, Norwegian captain and businessman, founded Hurtigruten (born 1846)
- 1932 – Junnosuke Inoue, Japanese businessman and banker (born 1869)
- 1932 – A.K. Golam Jilani, Bangladeshi soldier and activist (born 1904)
- 1935 – Bob Diry, Austrian-born wrestler and boxer (born 1884)
- 1942 – Lauri Kristian Relander, Finnish politician, 2nd President of Finland (born 1883)
- 1945 – Ella D. Barrier, American educator (born 1852)
- 1950 – Ted Theodore, Australian politician, 20th Premier of Queensland (born 1884)
- 1951 – Eddy Duchin, American pianist, bandleader, and actor (born 1910)
- 1957 – Miklós Horthy, Hungarian admiral and politician, Regent of Hungary (born 1868)
- 1960 – Alexandre Benois, Russian painter and critic (born 1870)
- 1960 – Ernő Dohnányi, Hungarian pianist, composer, and conductor (born 1877)
- 1965 – Khan Bahadur Ahsanullah, Bangladeshi theologian and educator (born 1874)
- 1966 – Sophie Tucker, Russian-born American singer (born 1884)
- 1969 – George "Gabby" Hayes, American actor and singer (born 1885)
- 1976 – Percy Faith, Canadian composer and conductor (born 1908)
- 1977 – Sergey Ilyushin, Russian engineer and businessman, founded the Ilyushin Design Bureau (born 1894)
- 1978 – Costante Girardengo, Italian cyclist and coach (born 1893)
- 1979 – Allen Tate, American poet and academic (born 1899)
- 1980 – Tom Macdonald, Welsh journalist and author (born 1900)
- 1981 – M. C. Chagla, Indian jurist and politician, Indian Minister of External Affairs (born 1900)
- 1981 – Bill Haley, American singer-songwriter and guitarist (born 1925)
- 1984 – Yuri Andropov, Russian lawyer and politician (born 1914)
- 1989 – Osamu Tezuka, Japanese illustrator, animator, and producer (born 1928)
- 1994 – Howard Martin Temin, American geneticist and academic, Nobel Prize laureate (born 1934)
- 1995 – J. William Fulbright, American lawyer and politician (born 1905)
- 1995 – Kalevi Keihänen, Finnish entrepreneur (born 1924)
- 1995 – David Wayne, American actor (born 1914)
- 1998 – Maurice Schumann, French journalist and politician, French Minister of Foreign Affairs (born 1911)
- 2001 – Herbert A. Simon, American political scientist, economist, and academic, Nobel Prize laureate (born 1916)
- 2002 – Isabelle Holland, Swiss-American author (born 1920)
- 2002 – Princess Margaret, Countess of Snowdon (born 1930)
- 2003 – Masatoshi Gündüz Ikeda, Japanese-Turkish mathematician and academic (born 1926)
- 2004 – Claude Ryan, Canadian journalist and politician (born 1925)
- 2005 – Robert Kearns, American engineer, invented the intermittent windscreen wiper (born 1927)
- 2006 – Freddie Laker, English pilot and businessman, founded Laker Airways (born 1922)
- 2007 – Hank Bauer, American baseball player and manager (born 1922)
- 2007 – Ian Richardson, Scottish actor (born 1934)
- 2008 – Christopher Hyatt, American occultist and author (born 1943)
- 2008 – Carm Lino Spiteri, Maltese architect and politician (born 1932)
- 2008 – Jazeh Tabatabai, Iranian painter, poet, and sculptor (born 1931)
- 2009 – Orlando "Cachaíto" López, Cuban bassist and composer (born 1933)
- 2010 – Walter Frederick Morrison, American businessman, invented the Frisbee (born 1920)
- 2011 – Miltiadis Evert, Greek lawyer and politician, 69th Mayor of Athens (born 1939)
- 2012 – O. P. Dutta, Indian director, producer, and screenwriter (born 1922)
- 2012 – John Hick, English philosopher and academic (born 1922)
- 2012 – Joe Moretti, Scottish-South African guitarist and songwriter (born 1938)
- 2013 – Richard Artschwager, American painter, illustrator, and sculptor (born 1923)
- 2013 – Keiko Fukuda, Japanese-American martial artist and trainer (born 1913)
- 2013 – Jimmy Smyth, Irish hurler (born 1931)
- 2014 – Gabriel Axel, Danish actor, director, and producer (born 1918)
- 2014 – Hal Herring, American football player and coach (born 1924)
- 2014 – Logan Scott-Bowden, English general (born 1920)
- 2015 – Liu Han, Chinese businessman and philanthropist (born 1965)
- 2015 – Ed Sabol, American film producer, co-founded NFL Films (born 1916)
- 2016 – Sushil Koirala, Nepalese politician, 37th Prime Minister of Nepal (born 1939)
- 2016 – Zdravko Tolimir, Bosnian Serb military commander (born 1948)
- 2017 – André Salvat, French Army colonel (born 1920)
- 2018 – Reg E. Cathey, American actor of stage, film, and television (born 1958)
- 2018 – Jóhann Jóhannsson, Icelandic composer (born 1969)
- 2018 – John Gavin, American actor and United States ambassador to Mexico (born 1931)
- 2021 – Chick Corea, American jazz composer (born 1941)
- 2022 – Johnny Raper, Australian rugby league player and coach (born 1939)
- 2025 – Tom Robbins, American writer (born 1932)

== Holidays and observances ==
- Alto of Altomünster
- Blessed Anne Catherine Emmerich
- Ansbert of Rouen
- Apollonia
- Bracchio
- Einion the King (Western Orthodoxy)
- Blessed Leopold of Alpandeire
- Maron (Maronite Church)
- Miguel Febres Cordero
- Nebridius
- Sabinus of Canosa
- Teilo (Wales)

== Bibliography ==
- Hill, Alan (1998). Jim Laker: A Biography. London: Andre Deutsch Ltd. ISBN 978-02-33050-43-0.
- Runciman, Steven (1951), The History of the Crusades Volume I: The First Crusade and the Foundation of the Kingdom of Jerusalem, Cambridge University Press
- Horse-Racing: Its History and Early Records of the Principal and other Race Meetings with Anecdotes etc. London: Saunders, Otley & Co. 1863.
