= Fusco =

Fusco is an Italian surname. Notable people with the surname include:

- Alfonso Maria Fusco, Italian Roman Catholic priest
- Angela Fusco, Canadian actress
- Angelo Fusco, Provisional Irish Republican Army member
- Antonio Fusco, Italian professional football player
- Brandon Fusco, American football player
- Cecilia Fusco (1933–2020), Italian operatic soprano, daughter of Giovanni
- Coco Fusco, American artist
- Cosimo Fusco, Italian actor
- Daniel Fusco (born 1975), lead pastor of Crossroads Community Church in Vancouver, Washington
- Emiliano Fusco, Argentine football midfielder
- Fusco (footballer), born João Carlos Proença Filipe, former Portuguese footballer
- Gian Carlo Fusco, Italian writer, journalist, screenwriter and actor
- Giovanni Fusco (1906–1968), Italian composer, pianist and conductor, brother of Tarcisio
- Joe Fusco (1938–2025), American head football coach
- John Fusco, American screenwriter
- John Fusco (Connecticut politician), American Republican Party politician
- John Fusco (New York politician), American lawyer, jurist, and politician
- Lionel Fusco, fictional character in the TV series Person of Interest
- Luca Fusco, Italian footballer
- Maria Fusco, Belfast born writer, lecturer, art critic, and events organiser
- Mark Fusco, American ice hockey player
- Nicola Fusco, Italian mathematician
- Onofrio Fusco, Italian professional football player and coach
- Paul Fusco, American voice actor
- Paul Fusco (photographer) (1930–2020), American photojournalist
- Raffaele Di Fusco, Italian professional football coach and a former player
- Scott Fusco, American ice hockey player
- Tarcisio Fusco (1904–?), Italian composer of film scores, brother of Giovanni
- Blessed Tommaso Maria Fusco, Italian Roman Catholic priest

== See also ==
- The Fusco Brothers, American comic strip by J. C. Duffy
- Fuschi, a variant of the surname "Fusco"
