= Flight 797 =

Flight 797 may refer to:

- Air Canada Flight 797, 1983 flight from Dallas/Fort Worth to Montréal; an in-flight fire killed 23 passengers
- Varig Flight 797, 1987 flight from Abidjan, Côte d'Ivoire to Rio de Janeiro, Brazil; plane crashed killing 50 of 51 onboard
