= Colaneri =

Colaneri is an Italian surname. Notable people with the surname include:

- Joseph Colaneri, American conductor
- Lelio Colaneri (1917–?), Italian footballer
