= Kambamba Kulaxingo =

- King of Baixa de Cassanje
- Successor: Dianhenga Aspirante Mjinji Kulaxingo

Kambamba Kulaxingo (1899 – 15 January 2006), also known as Kambamjiji Kulaxingu, was the King of Baixa de Cassanje until his death in 2006.

In 2002, King Kulaxingo called on the Angolan government to establish a 19th province covering several districts of the Malanje and Lunda Norte provinces.
