= Fuschi =

Fuschi is an Italian surname, a variant of the surname Fusco. It may refer to

== People ==
- Michael of Cesena, an Italian Franciscan, general of that Order and theologian, also known as Michele Fuschi
- Olegna Fuschi, an American musician and former director of the pre-college division at Juilliard
- Rick Fuschi, a Canadian politician

== Places ==
- Fuschi, a contrado (village) of Morcone in Italy
