= Engelbert König =

Austrian footballer (1919–1997)

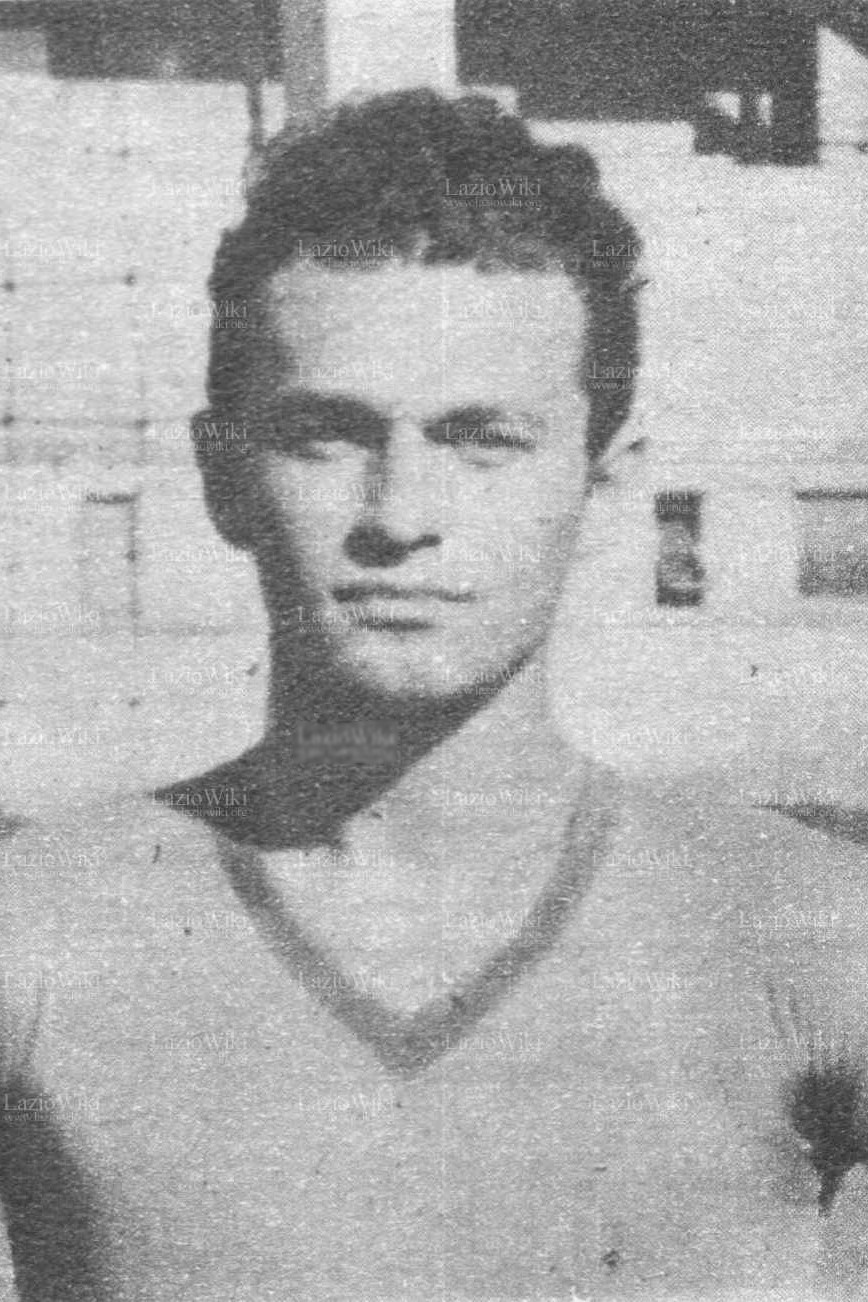

Personal information
- Date of birth: 8 October 1919
- Place of birth: Vienna, Austria
- Date of death: 23 November 1997 (aged 78)
- Position: Striker

Senior career*
Years	Team	Apps	(Gls)
1938–1940	First Vienna FC		
1940–1941	Fiorentina	2	(1)
1941–1942	Catania		
1942–1947	S.S. Lazio	59	(29)
1947–1948	U.C. Sampdoria	17	(7)
1948–1950	Genoa	39	(10)
1950–1952	Messina	33	(15)
- * Club domestic league appearances and goals

Engelbert König (8 October 1919 – 23 November 1997) was an Austrian footballer. König was a technical and determined striker during his career.

His main debut was while he was on the Fiorentina team, the biggest series, and continued to gain traction in his career from then on.

== During the war ==
König stayed in Rome til the end of World War 2 and took part in the city tournament organized to keep interest in sport after the war.
