= Glauco Signorini =

Italian footballer

Personal information
- Date of birth: 1 January 1913
- Place of birth: Rome, Italy
- Date of death: 4 August 1987 (aged 74)
- Height: 1.62 m (5 ft 4 in)
- Position: Midfielder

Senior career*
Years	Team	Apps	(Gls)
1933–1936	Roman		
1936–1937	Roma	1	(0)
- * Club domestic league appearances and goals

Glauco Signorini (1 January 1913 – 4 August 1987) was an Italian professional footballer who played as a midfielder.

He played one game in the Serie A for A.S. Roma in the 1936–37 season.
