= Bracchio =

Saint Bracchio
- Died: 576 AD; Auvergne, France
- Venerated in: Roman Catholic Church, Eastern Orthodox Church
- Feast: February 9

Saint Bracchio /ˈbrækioʊ/ of Tours (or of Auvergne) (d. 576 AD) was an abbot. Bracchio had been a Thuringian nobleman who had served in the court of Sigiswald of Clermont. Gregory of Tours writes that Bracchio’s name meant “bear’s whelp” in the Germanic language.

An avid hunter, Bracchio was one day pursuing a wild boar when the boar escaped into the hut of a Gallo-Roman hermit named Emilian, who offered the huntsman some wild fruit. Cowed by the hermit’s presence, Bracchio’s dogs refused to attack the boar. Intrigued by the hermit and his apparent power, Bracchio and the hermit discussed spiritual matters.

After the death of his lord Sigiswald, Bracchio soon gave up his worldly life and became Emilian’s spiritual student for three years. Bracchio studied the golden letters on the images of the hermitage’s church and soon learned how to read, and soon knew the psalter by heart. The hermitage soon attracted other prospective students. After Emilian’s death, Bracchio turned the hermitage, which Emilian had bequeathed to him, into a monastery dedicated to Saint Saturninus (Saturnin).

The grant of land for the new monastery was given to Bracchio by Ramichilde, the daughter of Sigiswald. Bracchio subsequently became the abbot of Menat in the Auvergne, and re-established strict monastic discipline there.
