= Daniel Fusco =

American musician

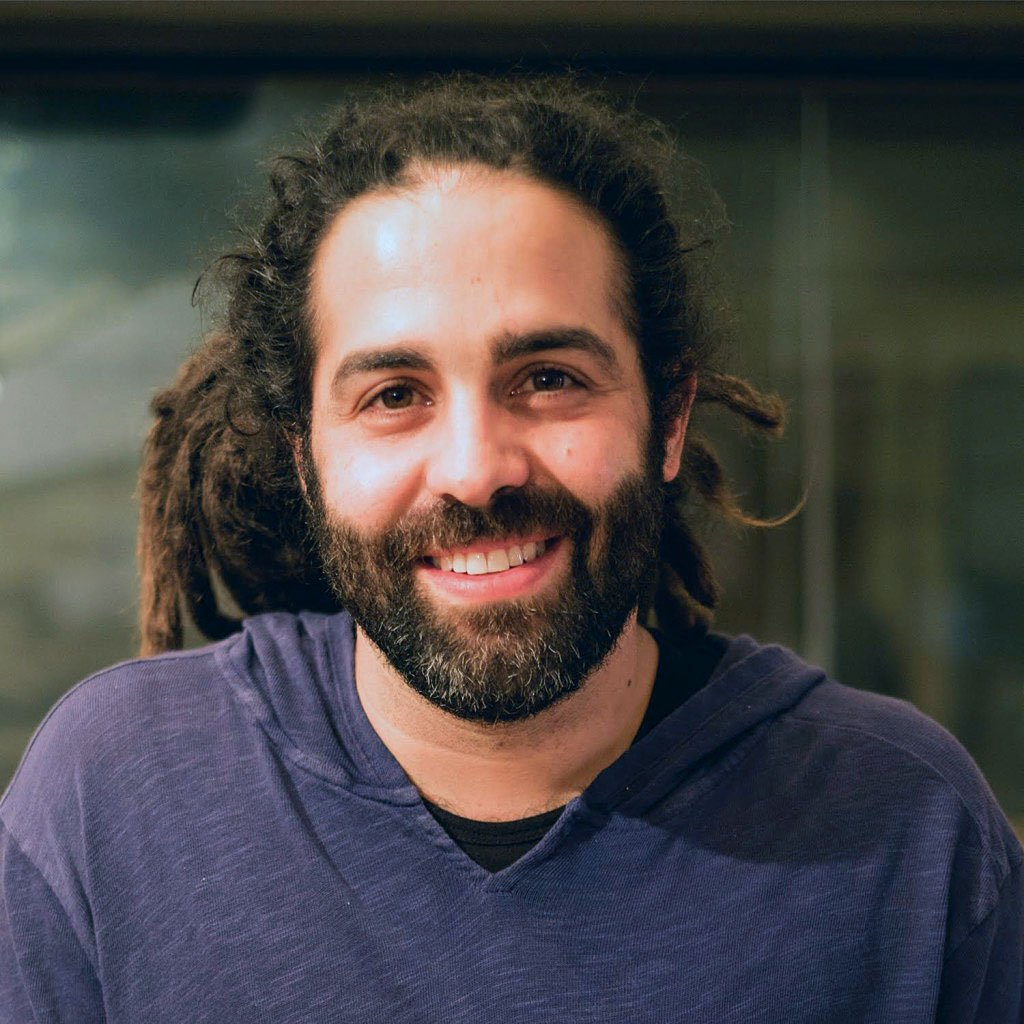
- Born: December 31, 1975 (age 50); Freehold, New Jersey
- Education: Rutgers University
- Occupation: Pastor
- Website: www.danielfusco.com crossroadschurch.net

Daniel Thomas Fusco (born December 31, 1975, in Freehold Township, New Jersey) is an American author and lead pastor of Crossroads Community Church in Vancouver, WA.

== Early life ==
Fusco was raised in a spiritually nominal household and came to a saving knowledge of Jesus Christ in April 1998 during his final year at Rutgers University. After a few years as a professional musician and bassist, Fusco transitioned into pastoral ministry at Calvary Chapel Marin in Novato, California.

== Career ==
Fusco spent his initial years as a pastor planting churches. He founded Calvary Chapel New Brunswick in New Jersey; Calvary Chapel North Bay in Mill Valley, CA; and Calvary San Francisco in San Francisco, CA.

After being ordained in 2002, Fusco was sent out to plant Calvary Chapel New Brunswick, located in New Jersey. In November 2006, that church was turned over to his successor so that Fusco could move back to the San Francisco Bay Area to plant more churches. While in the Bay Area, Fusco planted Calvary North Bay in Mill Valley, CA. In 2010, while continuing to pastor the church in Mill Valley, Fusco planted Calvary San Francisco. In 2012, Fusco turned over both churches to move to Vancouver, Washington, to become the lead pastor at Crossroads Community Church, where he presently serves. He is also the founder of the Calvary Church Planting Network which helps facilitate church planters.

Fusco is also a writer and a featured contributor to "Preaching Today" where he has published articles with Leadership Journal, pastors.com, and Calvarychapel.com.

Fusco also runs several podcasts.

== Discography ==
- OM Trio - The Clarified Butter (1999)
- OM Trio - Jazz Trio (2000)
- Leslie Kendall - This One’s For You … And Me (2000)
- OM Trio - Meat Curtain (2000)
- Asher / LaMacchia - Evolution (2007)
- Michael LaMacchia & Aurea Fernandes - Brazilian Serenade (2008)
- Dave Getz Breakaway - Can’t Be The Only One (2011)
- The Responding - Your Kingdom is Here (2014)
- Triologue - Friday Night in Sausalito (releases in 2016)

== Books ==
- Ahead Of The Curve. Tate Publishing (March 29, 2011). ISBN 978-1617394416.
- Honestly: Getting Real About Jesus And Our Messy Lives. NavPress (April 1, 2016). ISBN 978-1-63146-386-0.
- Upward, Inward, Outward: Love God, Love Yourself, Love Others NavPress (October 10, 2017). ISBN 9781631463907
- Crazy Happy: Nine Surprising Ways to Live the Truly Beautiful Life. WaterBrook (February 16, 2021). ISBN 9780593192665.
- You're Gonna Make It: Unlocking Resilience When Life Is a Mess. WaterBrook (September 13, 2022). ISBN 9780593192689.
