= Baixa de Cassanje =

Kingdom in Angola

Baixa de Cassanje, also called Baixa de Kassanje, is a non-sovereign kingdom in Angola. Kambamba Kulaxingo was its king until his death in 2006. Presently, Dianhenga Aspirante Mjinji Kulaxingo serves as the king.

== History ==
The region of Baixa de Cassanje, in the district of Malanje, Portuguese Angola, before independence in 1975, was an important cotton-producing area. In 1911, it capitulated to Portuguese forces and was incorporated into Portuguese Angola.

The January 4, 1961 Baixa de Cassanje revolt is considered a trigger for the Angolan War of Independence (1961–1974), which however was being prepared by several pro-independence guerrillas in neighbouring African countries with support of world powers such as the Soviet Union.

== See also ==
- Baixa de Cassanje revolt
- Angolan War of Independence
- Grupo Desportivo Baixa de Cassanje
