= Strike in Baixa do Cassange =

1961 revolt against Portuguese rule of Angola

The strike in Baixa do Cassange (Portuguese: Greve da Baixa do Cassange), also called Mariano's revolt and Maria's war, was a labor strike that is considered the first political movement that would trigger the Angolan War of Independence exactly one month later and the Portuguese Colonial War over the next three years in the Portuguese overseas provinces. The uprising began on 4 January 1961 in the region of Baixa do Cassanje, district of Malanje, Portuguese Angola. By the following day, the Portuguese authorities had successfully suppressed the revolt. 4 January is now Colonial Martyrs Repression Day (Dia dos Mártires da Repressão Colonial), a national holiday in Angola.

== Revolts ==
=== 3 January ===
On 3 January 1961, agricultural workers employed by Cotonang, a Portuguese-Belgian cotton plantation company, staged a protest demanding improved working conditions. The protest, which later became known as the Baixa de Cassanje revolt, was led by two previously unknown Angolans, António Mariano and Kulu-Xingu. During the protest, the Angolan workers burned their identification cards and physically attacked Portuguese traders on the company premises. The protest led to a general uprising, which Portuguese authorities responded to with an air raid the following day on twenty villages in the area, killing large numbers of villagers. While the People's Movement for the Liberation of Angola (MPLA) claimed that the air raid killed some 10,000 people, most estimates range from 400 to as many as 7,000 killed. Colonial Martyrs Repression Day is commemorated each year with a public holiday on 4 January.

=== 15 March ===
On 15 March, a little over two months later, the União das Populações de Angola (UPA), with Holden Roberto as its figurehead, staged a popular revolt in the Bakongo region of northern Angola, specifically Ambuila. Angolan Bantu farmers and coffee-plantation workers joined the uprising and, in an act of reactive rage, killed some 1,000 white Angolans in the span of two days, together with an unknown number of natives who had collaborated in the preservation of the colonial order. The rioters burned plantations, bridges, government facilities, and police stations, and destroyed several barges and ferries. Graphic images of raped and mutilated settlers inflamed the Portuguese public, and the Portuguese Army instituted a counter-insurgency campaign that destroyed dozens of villages and killed some 20,000 people before the uprising was put down in September 1961.
