= Varig Flight 797 =

1987 aviation accident

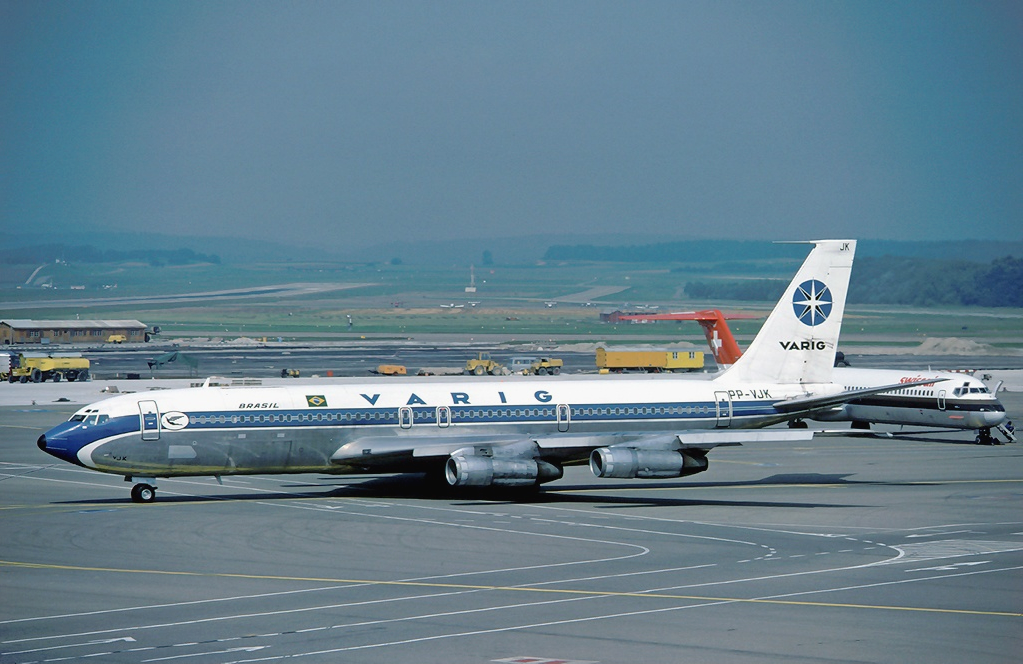
- PP-VJK, the aircraft involved in the accident, pictured in 1982

Accident
- Date: 3 January 1987
- Summary: Engine failure, crashed on emergency approach due to pilot error
- Site: Akouré, Ivory Coast

Aircraft
- Aircraft type: Boeing 707-320C
- Operator: Varig
- IATA flight No.: RG797
- ICAO flight No.: VRG797
- Call sign: VARIG 797
- Registration: PP-VJK
- Flight origin: Port Bouet Airport, Abidjan, Ivory Coast
- Destination: Rio de Janeiro–Galeão International Airport, Rio de Janeiro, Brazil
- Occupants: 51
- Passengers: 39
- Crew: 12
- Fatalities: 50
- Injuries: 1
- Survivors: 1

Varig Flight 797 was a scheduled passenger flight from Abidjan, Ivory Coast to Rio de Janeiro, Brazil. On 3 January 1987, the Boeing 707 crashed during an emergency return to Abidjan, killing all 12 crew members and 38 of the 39 passengers. After an engine failure, the pilot decided to turn back but misjudged the approach and stalled the aircraft. It crashed onto a rubber plantation in the midst of the jungle, 18 kilometres (11 mi; 9.7 nmi) from the airport at a speed of 400 kilometres per hour (220 kn; 250 mph). Many passengers who survived the initial crash died in the fire that followed.

== Background ==
=== Aircraft ===
The aircraft involved was a Boeing 707-379C, registered as PP-VJK, that first flew in 1968. It was powered by four Pratt & Witney JT3D-3B turbofan engines. PP-VJK was Varig's final passenger Boeing 707, and the aircraft's final flight with Varig, having already been sold to the Brazilian Air Force.

=== Crew ===
The flight crew consisted of Captain Júlio César Carneiro Corrêa (38), First Officer Nélson Figueiredo, and Flight Engineer Eugênio Cardoso.

== Accident ==
On 2 January, during the aircraft's penultimate flight to Abidjan, the fire alarm for the outer left (No. 1) engine sounded. Another airline, Air Afrique, which performed maintenance for Varig, inspected the engine and determined that it was a false alarm. In the early morning hours of darkness on 3 January, the aircraft departed Port Bouet Airport in Abidjan. 20 minutes after departure and 200 kilometres (120 mi; 110 nmi) from Abidjan, the fire alarm for the no. 1 engine sounded a second time. Flight engineer Cardoso reported high fuel temperatures in the engine, but the other engines were functioning normally. As a precaution, captain Corrêa shut down the faulty engine and decided to return to Abidjan.

Cardoso then reported a fuel leak on engine no 1, though the crew had difficulty identifying it. A flight attendant reported that a passenger had observed engine no. 1 emitting fire. As the aircraft flew over Abidjan, the tower controller at Port Bouet Airport cleared the flight to land on runway 03, the closest available runway. Even though the weather was suitable for a visual approach, captain Corrêa requested to land on runway 21 instead, as it was equipped with an instrument landing system (ILS). However, this approach required additional maneuvers, including a left turn onto a 270 degree heading. The crew (possibly in an attempted to prevent asymmetric thrust) decided to delay extending the flaps and the landing gear until turning past the VHF omnidirectional range. With the flaps retracted, the aircraft flew faster to prevent a stall.

During the turn, the stick shaker (stall warning) was activated and the ground proximity warning system emitted several "bank angle" warnings. The aircraft rolled 90 degrees to the left, stalled, and crashed on a rubber plantation in the midst of the jungle 18 kilometres (11 mi; 9.7 nmi) from the airport at a speed of 400 kilometres per hour (250 mph).

== Victims ==
Nationalities of the persons on board:

Nationality	Passengers	Crew	Total
Brazil	10	12	22
Israel	2	0	2
Côte d'Ivoire	13	0	13
Lebanon	3	0	3
France	2	0	2
West Germany	2	0	2
Senegal	2	0	2
United States	1	0	1
United Kingdom	1	0	1
Peru	1	0	1
Chile	1	0	1
Cameroon	1	0	1
Total	39	12	51

Three people (all passengers) initially survived, though one died several hours later. Four days after the disaster, a British passenger died of his injuries on board a Swiss aircraft while arriving in Paris; he was going to be transferred to a burn unit in a Paris suburb. The sole survivor, identified as an Ivorian university professor, had burns on less than 20 percent of his body. While being interviewed by investigators, the professor said that more people had survived the initial impact but died of burns. He also stated that he managed to drag the British passenger who initially survived, away from the wreckage of the aircraft. The sole survivor died of a heart attack on 4 March 2015 at the age of 72.

== See also ==
- List of aviation accidents and incidents with a sole survivor
- Varig Flight 810
- VASP Flight 168
