= Akouré =

- Village
- Location in Ivory Coast
- Coordinates: 5°23′N 3°45′W
- Country: Ivory Coast
- District: Lagunes
- Region: La Mé
- Department: Alépé
- Sub-prefecture: Oghlwapo
- Time zone: UTC+0 (GMT)

Akouré is a village in south-eastern Ivory Coast. It is in the sub-prefecture of Oghlwapo, Alépé Department, La Mé Region, Lagunes District.

Akouré was a commune until March 2012, when it became one of 1,126 communes nationwide that were abolished.
