= Lelio Colaneri =

Italian footballer

Personal information
- Date of birth: 7 April 1917
- Place of birth: San Vito Romano, Italy
- Date of death: 25 September 1994 (aged 77)
- Position: Midfielder

Senior career*
Years	Team	Apps	(Gls)
1938–1939	Maceratese		
1939–1941	Fanfulla	65	(27)
1941–1942	Juventus	17	(4)
1942–1943	Biellese	8	(2)
1943–1944	Tirrenia Roma	14	(10)
1945–1947	Salernitana	22	(6)
- * Club domestic league appearances and goals

Lelio Colaneri (7 April 1917 – 25 September 1994) was an Italian professional football player.
