= Oghlwapo =

- Town and sub-prefecture
- Location in Ivory Coast
- Coordinates: 5°24′N 3°45′W
- Country: Ivory Coast
- District: Lagunes
- Region: La Mé
- Department: Alépé

Population (2014)
  - Total: 9,668
- Time zone: UTC+0 (GMT)

Oghlwapo is a town in southeastern Ivory Coast. It is a sub-prefecture of Alépé Department in La Mé Region, Lagunes District.

Oghlwapo was a commune until March 2012, when it became one of 1,126 communes nationwide that were abolished.
