= Enzo Cozzolini =

Italian footballer (1924-1962)

Personal information
- Date of birth: January 3, 1924
- Place of birth: Rome, Italy
- Date of death: September 30, 1962 (aged 38)
- Position: Midfielder

Senior career*
Years	Team	Apps	(Gls)
1942–1946	Roma	34	(11)
1946–1947	Rieti		
1947–1948	Empoli	18	(4)
1948–1951	Brescia	66	(11)
1951–1952	Piombino	33	(3)
1952–1953	Catania	16	(1)
1953–1954	Piacenza	19	(3)
- * Club domestic league appearances and goals

Enzo Cozzolini (January 3, 1924 – September 30, 1962) was an Italian professional football player. He was born in Rome. He played 2 games in the Serie A in the 1942/43 season for A.S. Roma.
