= Enrico Schiavetti =

Italian footballer (1920-1993)

Personal information
- Date of birth: February 9, 1920
- Place of birth: Tivoli, Italy
- Date of death: February 16, 1993 (aged 73)
- Position: Midfielder

Senior career*
Years	Team	Apps	(Gls)
1937–1938	Roma	1	(0)
1938–1939	Palermo	20	(0)
1939–1941	Sora		
1943–1948	Roma	93	(8)
- * Club domestic league appearances and goals

Enrico Schiavetti (February 9, 1920 – February 16, 1993) was an Italian professional football player. Born in Tivoli, he played for 3 seasons (53 games, 1 goal) in the Serie A for A.S. Roma.
