= Antonio Fusco =

Italian footballer (born 1916)

Personal information
- Date of birth: January 6, 1916
- Place of birth: Rome, Italy
- Height: 1.67 m (5 ft 5 1/2 in)
- Position: Midfielder

Senior career*
| Years | Team | Apps | (Gls) |
| 1932–1933 | Ostiense | | |
| 1933–1940 | Roma | 121 | (4) |
| 1940–1942 | Pisa | 41 | (6) |
| 1942–1943 | M.A.T.E.R. | 1 | (0) |
| 1943–1944 | Avia Roma | 13 | (0) |
| 1945–1947 | Roma | 3 | (0) |
- * Club domestic league appearances and goals

Antonio Fusco (born January 6, 1916) was an Italian professional football player.

He played for 8 seasons (122 games, 4 games) in the Serie A for A.S. Roma.
