= Innocent (name) =

Innocent is a given name and a surname. Notable people with the name include:

== Given name ==
- Pope Innocent (disambiguation)
- Saint Innocent (disambiguation)
- Audu Innocent Ogbeh (born 1947), Nigerian politician
- Innocent (actor) (1948–2023), Indian actor and producer
- Innocent (Giesel) (c. 1600–1683), Prussian-born historian, writer, and political and ecclesiastic figure
- Innocent (bishop of Syrmia) (fl. 13th century)
- Innocent Anyanwu (born 1982), Dutch professional boxer
- Innocent Asonze (born 1972), Nigerian sprinter
- Innocent Awoa (born 1988), Cameroonian footballer
- Innocent Barikor (fl. 21st century), Nigerian academic and politician
- Innocent Bashungwa (born 1979), Tanzanian politician
- Innocent Bologo (born 1989), Burkinabé sprinter
- Innocent Boutry (fl. 17th century), French Kapellmeister
- Innocent Chikunya (born 1985), Zimbabwean cricketer
- Innocent Chinyoka (born 1982), Zimbabwean cricketer
- Innocent Chukwuma (born 1961), Nigerian business magnate and investor
- Innocent Egbunike (born 1961), Nigerian sprinter
- Innocent Emeghara (born 1989), Swiss footballer
- Innocent Gentillet (1535–1588), French lawyer and politician
- Innocent Guz (1890–1940), born Joseph Adalbert Guz, Polish conventual Franciscan priest martyred by the Nazis
- Innocent Hamga (born 1981), Cameroonian footballer
- Innocent Idibia (born 1975), stage name 2Baba, Nigerian singer, songwriter, and producer
- Innocent Kaia (born 1992), Zimbabwean cricketer
- Innocent Kalogeris (born 1959), Tanzanian politician
- Innocent Lotocky (1915–2013), American Bishop of the Ukrainian Catholic Church
- Innocent Maela (born 1992), South African soccer player
- Innocent Mdledle (born 1985), South African footballer
- Innocent Melkam (1981), Nigerian footballer
- Innocent Muchaneka (born 1991), Zimbabwean footballer
- Innocent Mugabe, Kenyan politician
- Innocent Masina Nkhonyo (born 1987), Malawian Chichewa-language writer and poet
- Innocent Nshuti (born 1998), Rwandan footballer
- Innocent Ntsume (born 1980), South African footballer
- Innocent Obiri (fl. 21st century), Kenyan politician
- Innocent Ordu (born 1961), Nigerian Anglican bishop
- Innocent Oula (born 1961), Ugandan army officer and politician
- Innocent Pikirayi (born 1963), Zimbabwean archaeologist
- Innocent Ranku (fl. 20th/21st centuries), Botswanan footballer
- Innocent Sagahutu (born 1962), Rwandan soldier who participated in the 1994 Rwandan genocide
- Innocent Simiyu (born 1983), Kenyan rugby union footballer
- Innocent Sousa (1879–1962), Indian English-language poet and writer
- Innocent Umezulike (1953–2018), Nigerian jurist
- Innocent Mahamadu Yahaya (1954–2000), Ghanaian politician

== Surname ==
- Bonke Innocent (born 1996), Nigerian footballer
- Garissone Innocent (born 2000), French footballer
- Harold Innocent (1933–1993), English actor
- Nnamdi Innocent (born 1980), Nigerian Paralympic powerlifter
- Vitel'Homme Innocent (born 1986), Haitian fugitive

== See also ==
- Innocenti (surname)
- Inocencio (surname)
- Innocencio
