= Innocent (disambiguation) =

Innocent means a lack of guilt with respect to any kind of crime, sin, or wrongdoing.

Innocent or The Innocent may also refer to:

== People ==
- Innocent (name), a list of people with the given name and surname
- Pope Innocent (disambiguation)
- Saint Innocent (disambiguation)
- Innocent (actor) (1948–2023), Indian actor and producer
- Innocent (Giesel) (c. 1600–1683), Prussian-born historian, writer, and political and ecclesiastic figure
- Innocent (bishop of Syrmia) (fl. 13th century)

== Arts and entertainment ==
=== Films ===
- Innocent (1918 film), an American silent film starring Fannie Ward
- Innocent (1921 film), a British silent drama film by Maurice Elvey
- The Innocent (1976 film), an Italian film by Luchino Visconti
- The Innocent (1985 film), a British drama by John Mackenzie
- The Innocent (1986 film), an Egyptian film
- The Innocent (1993 film), a spy thriller by John Schlesinger
- The Innocent (1994 film), an American television film featuring Kelsey Grammer
- Innocent (1999 film), a French drama by Costa Natsis
- Innocent (2009 film), an American action film by Aram Rappaport
- Innocent (2011 film), an America made-for-TV movie
- Inocente, a 2012 short documentary film directed by Sean Fine
- The Innocent (2022 film), a 2022 French drama film
- Innocent (2025 film), an Indian comedy film by Satheesh Thanvi

=== Literature ===
- Innocent (manga), a 2013–2020 manga series by Shinichi Sakamoto
- Innocent (novel), a 2010 novel by Scott Turow
- Innocent: Her Fancy and His Fact, a 1914 novel by Marie Corelli
- The Innocent (Baldacci novel), a 2012 book by David Baldacci
- The Innocent (Coben novel), a 2005 novel by Harlan Coben
- The Innocent (Kim novel), a 1968 novel by Richard E. Kim
- The Innocent (McEwan novel), a 1990 novel by Ian McEwan
- The Innocent (Stevens novel), a 2011 novel by Taylor Stevens
- The Innocent (play), a 1979 play by Tom McGrath

=== Music ===
==== Performers ====
- The Innocent (band), an American band of which Trent Reznor was formerly a member

==== Albums ====
- Innocent (EP), by Rainbow, 2015
- Innocent, an album by Sachi Tainaka, 2011

==== Songs ====
- "Innocent" (Alexander O'Neal song), 1985
- "Innocent" (Fuel song), 2000
- "Innocent" (Mike Oldfield song), 1989; covered by Groove Coverage, 2010
- "Innocent" (Our Lady Peace song), 2002
- "Innocent" (Stereophonics song), 2009
- "Innocent" (Taylor Swift song), 2010
- "Innocent", by Small Mercies from Beautiful Hum, 2008
- "Innocent", by Stellar Kart from Expect the Impossible, 2008
- "The Innocent", by Drivin' N' Cryin' from Fly Me Courageous, 1991
- "The Innocent", by Mayer Hawthorne from Where Does This Door Go, 2013
- "The Innocent", by Aurora from The Gods We Can Touch, 2022

==== Labels ====
- Innocent Records, a British record label
- Innocent Records (Australia)

=== Television ===
==== Episodes ====
- "Innocent", Ace of Diamond season 2, episode 34 (2015)
- "Innocent", Angel's Friends episode 33 (2010)
- "Innocent", CSI: Miami season 2, episode 24 (2004)
- "Innocent", Fantasy Island (1998) episode 11 (1999)
- "Innocent", Grand Jury episode 37 (1960)
- "Innocent", La Femme Nikita season 1, episode 12 (1997)
- "Innocent: Part 1" and "Innocent: Part 2", Touching Evil series 3, episodes 1–2 (1999)
- The Innocent (Armchair Theatre), a 1960 British television play
- "The Innocent", Carson's Law episode 109 (1984)
- "The Innocent", Ghost Lab season 2, episode 8 (2010)
- "The Innocent", Gunsmoke season 15, episode 10 (1969)
- "The Innocent", Highlander: The Series season 4, episode 3 (1995)
- "The Innocent", How the West Was Won season 3, episode 4 (1979)
- "The Innocent", Kung Fu: The Legend Continues season 3, episode 13 (1994)
- "The Innocent", Logan's Run episode 4 (1977)
- "The Innocent", Mission: Impossible (1966) season 5, episode 3 (1970)
- "The Innocent", Paranormal Witness season 3, episode 15 (2013)
- "The Innocent", Spooks series 4, episode 6 (2005)
- "The Innocent", The Guardian season 2, episode 7 (2002)
- "The Innocent", The Invaders season 1, episode 10 (1967)

==== Shows ====
- Innocent (TV series), a 2018 & 2021 British miniseries
- The Innocent (TV serial), a 2001 British miniseries
- The Innocent (TV series), a Spanish series on Netflix

== Other uses ==
- Innocent Drinks, a drink manufacturer, majority owned by Coca-Cola

== See also ==
- Innocence (disambiguation)
- The Innocents (disambiguation), including uses of Innocents
- Inocencio (disambiguation)
- Innocencio
