= Innocence (disambiguation) =

Innocence is a lack of guilt, with respect to any kind of crime, sin, or wrongdoing, or else a lack of worldly understanding on sensitive issues such as crime and sexuality.

Innocence may also refer to:

== Film ==
- Innocence (1923 film), a 1923 American silent drama film
- Innocence (1997 film) (Masumiyet), a Turkish drama by Zeki Demirkubuz
- Innocence (2000 film), an Australian film by Paul Cox
- Innocence (2004 film), a French film by Lucile Hadžihalilović
- Innocence (2005 film), a Thai documentary
- Innocence (2011 film), (Nevinnost), a Czech film by Jan Hřebejk
- Innocence (2013 film), a 2013 film based on the book by the same name by Jane Mendelsohn
- Innocence (2020 film), a South Korean film
- Ghost in the Shell 2: Innocence, a 2004 anime film by Mamoru Oshii

== Literature ==
- "Innocence" (short story), a short story by Honoré de Balzac
- Innocence (Fitzgerald novel), a 1986 novel by Penelope Fitzgerald
- Innocence (Koontz novel), a 2013 novel by Dean Koontz
- Innocence (Mendelsohn novel), a 2000 novel by Jane Mendelsohn

== Music ==
=== Opera ===
- Innocence (opera), a 2021 opera by Kaija Saariaho

=== Performers ===
- Innocence (band), a 1990s British R&B band
- The Innocence, previously The Trade Winds, a 1960s American pop group

=== Albums ===
- Innocence (Kenny Barron album), 1978
- Innocence (Murray Head album), 1993
- Innocence (Alisa Mizuki album), 1999
- Innocence (Sennen EP), 2010
- Innocence (Davichi EP), 2010
- Innocence (Pontiak album), 2014
- Innocence (Jena Irene Asciutto EP), 2016
- Innocence (Kenny G album), 2023

=== Songs ===
- "Innocence" (Björk song), 2007
- "Innocence" (Nero song), 2010
- "Innocence" (Tarja song), 2016
- "Innocence", a song by Avril Lavigne from The Best Damn Thing
- "Innocence", a song by Boney James from Sweet Thing
- "Innocence", a song by Deborah Blando from A Different Story
- "Innocence", a song by Disturbed from Asylum
- "Innocence", a song by Flume, featuring AlunaGeorge, from Skin
- "Innocence", a song by Go West from their self-titled album
- "Innocence", a song by Halestorm from Halestorm
- "Innocence", a song by Harlequin
- "Innocence", a song by Hootie & the Blowfish from Hootie & the Blowfish
- "Innocence", a song by Jeremy Camp from Restored
- "Innocence", a song by Kirsty MacColl from Kite
- "Innocence", a song by Madeon, featuring Aquilo, from Adventure
- "Innocence", a song by Shaman from Reason

== Television episodes ==
- "Innocence" (Buffy the Vampire Slayer)
- "Innocence" (Law & Order)
- "Innocence" (Star Trek: Voyager)

== Legal associations ==
- Innocence Network, an affiliation of organizations dedicated to providing pro bono legal and investigative services
- Innocence Project, a non-profit legal organization committed to exonerating wrongly convicted people

== See also ==
- Innosense, a 1997–2003 American all-female pop group
- Innocent (disambiguation)
- The Innocents (disambiguation)
- Inocencio (disambiguation)
- Innocencio
