= Inocencio =

Inocencio or Inocêncio may refer to:

== Surname ==
- Cristina Inocencio (born 1969), Spanish botanist; her author abbreviation is "Inocencio"
- Jorge Inocêncio (born 1993), Portuguese footballer
- Kata Inocencio (born 1960), Philippine broadcast journalist, child rights advocate, television producer and host
- Mateus Facho Inocêncio (born 1981), Brazilian athlete
- Máximo Inocencio (1833–1896), Filipino architect and businessman
- Víctor García San Inocencio (born 1958), Puerto Rican lawyer and politician

== Places ==
- Dom Inocêncio, municipality in the state of Piauí in the Northeast region of Brazil
- Frei Inocêncio, municipality in the state of Minas Gerais in the Southeast region of Brazil

== See also ==
- Innocencio
- Innocence (disambiguation)
- Innocent (disambiguation)
