= Surname =

Hereditary portion of a personal name

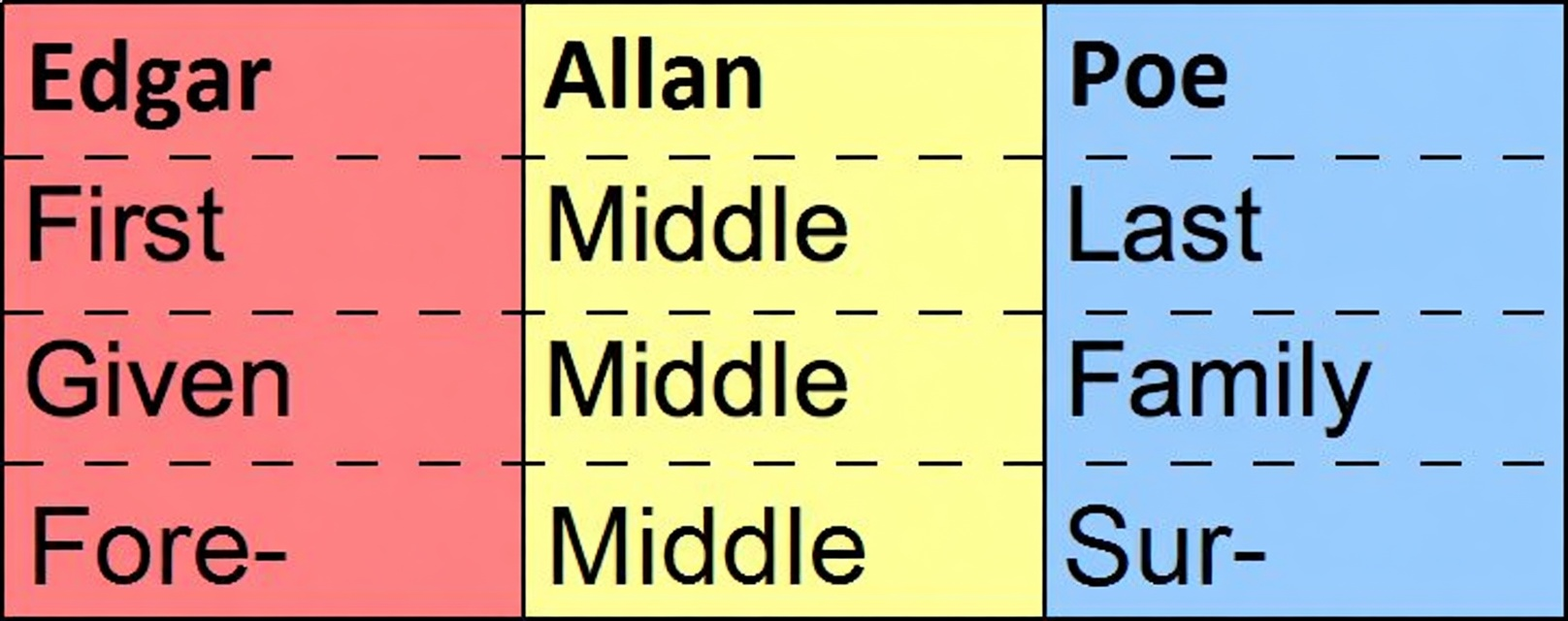
Chart showing a typical name structure in Anglophonic cultures using name of Edgar Allan Poe as an example. The convention for Anglophone naming system goes First / given / forename, middle, last / family / surname.

In many societies, a surname or family name is the mostly hereditary portion of one's personal name that indicates one's family. It is typically combined with a given name to form the full name of a person, although several given names and surnames are possible in the full name. In modern times most surnames are hereditary, although in most countries a person has a right to change their name.

A surname may also be referred to as a last name, particularly in American English, but not all societies place them last; some cultures place them at the start of a person's name. The number of surnames given to an individual also varies: in most cases it is just one, but in Portuguese-speaking countries and many Spanish-speaking countries, two surnames (one inherited from the mother and another from the father) are used for legal purposes. Depending on culture, not all members of a family unit are required to have identical surnames. In some countries, surnames are modified depending on gender and family membership status of a person. Compound surnames can be composed of separate names.

The use of names has been documented in even the oldest historical records, such as writing about the ancient Egyptian king Iry-Hor. Examples of surnames are documented in the 11th century by the barons in England. English surnames began to be formed with reference to a certain aspect of that individual, such as their trade, father's name, location of birth, or physical features, and were not necessarily inherited. By 1400 most English families, and those from Lowland Scotland, had adopted the use of hereditary surnames.

The study of proper names (in family names, personal names, or places) is called onomastics.

== History ==
=== Origin ===
While the use of given names to identify individuals is attested in the oldest historical records, the advent of surnames is relatively recent. Many cultures have used and continue to use additional descriptive terms in identifying individuals. These terms may indicate personal attributes, location of origin, occupation, parentage, patronage, adoption, or clan affiliation.

In China, according to legend, family names started with Emperor Fu Xi in 2000 BC. His administration standardised the naming system to facilitate census-taking, and the use of census information. Originally, Chinese surnames were derived matrilineally, although by the time of the Shang dynasty (1600 to 1046 BC) they had become patrilineal. Chinese women do not change their names upon marriage. In China, surnames have been quite common since at least the 2nd century BC.

In Ancient Greece, as far back as the Archaic Period clan names and patronymics ("son of") were also common, as in Aristides as Λῡσῐμᾰ́χου – a genitive singular form meaning son of Lysimachus. For example, Alexander the Great was known as Heracleides, as a supposed descendant of Heracles, and by the dynastic name Karanos/Caranus, which referred to the founder of the dynasty to which he belonged. These patronymics are already attested for many characters in the works of Homer. At other times formal identification commonly included the place of origin.

Over the course of the Roman Republic and the later Empire, naming conventions went through multiple changes. (See Roman naming conventions.) The nomen, the name of the gens (tribe) inherited patrilineally, is thought to have already been in use by 650 BC. The nomen was to identify group kinship, while the praenomen (forename; plural praenomina) was used to distinguish individuals within the group. Female praenomina were less common, as women had reduced public influence, and were commonly known by the feminine form of the nomen alone.

=== Medieval era and beyond ===
The practice of using family names spread through the Eastern Roman Empire, however it was not until the 11th century that surnames came to be used in West Europe. Medieval Spain used a patronymic system. For example, Álvaro, a son of Rodrigo, would be named Álvaro Rodríguez. His son, Juan, would not be named Juan Rodríguez, but Juan Álvarez. Over time, many of these patronymics became family names, and they are some of the most common names in the Spanish-speaking world today. Other sources of surnames are personal appearance or habit, e.g. Delgado ("thin") and Moreno ("dark"); geographic location or ethnicity, e.g. Alemán ("German"); and occupations, e.g. Molinero ("miller"), Zapatero ("shoe-maker") and Guerrero ("warrior"), although occupational names are much more often found in a shortened form referring to the trade itself, e.g. Molina ("mill"), Guerra ("war"), or Zapata (archaic form of zapato, "shoe").

In England the introduction of family names is generally attributed to the preparation of the Domesday Book in 1086, following the Norman Conquest. Evidence indicates that surnames were first adopted among the feudal nobility and gentry, and slowly spread to other parts of society. Some of the early Norman nobility who arrived in England during the Norman conquest differentiated themselves by affixing 'de' (of, from) before the name of their village in France (or estate). This is what is known as a territorial surname, a consequence of feudal landownership. By the 14th century, most English and most Scottish people used surnames and in Wales following unification under Henry VIII in 1536.

A four-year study led by the University of the West of England, which concluded in 2016, analysed sources dating from the 11th to the 19th century to explain the origins of the surnames in the British Isles. The study found that over 90% of the 45,602 surnames in the dictionary are native to Britain and Ireland, with the most common in the UK being Smith, Jones, Williams, Brown, Taylor, Davies, and Wilson. The findings have been published in the Oxford English Dictionary of Family Names in Britain and Ireland, with project leader Richard Coates calling the study "more detailed and accurate" than those before. He elaborated on the origins: "Some surnames have origins that are occupational – obvious examples are Smith and Baker. Other names can be linked to a place, for example, Hill or Green, which relates to a village green. Surnames that are 'patronymic' are those which originally enshrined the father's name – such as Jackson, or Jenkinson. There are also names where the origin describes the original bearer such as Brown, Short, or Thin – though Short may in fact be an ironic 'nickname' surname for a tall person."

In the modern era, governments have enacted laws to require people to adopt surnames. This served the purpose of uniquely identifying subjects for taxation purposes or for inheritance. In the late Middle Ages in England, mandatory surnames were resisted as they were associated with taxes.

Most modern Arabic names consist of a first, middle and surname, but this was not always the case. In medieval times some of the most common parts of a name are called: ism (given name), kunya (name relevant to offspring), nasab (name relevant to descent, traced through the patrilineal line), nisba (can be a tribal or geographical name) and laqab (a title or honorific name). Medieval Arabic documents show that Arabic names included multiple words, which did not appear in the same order that names are written in now. The given name was not always the first name, in terms of name order. Most documents from this era do not use the full name of a person. Al-Tabari, a polymath and author is referred to in this way, despite his full name being Abu Jaʿfar Muhammad ibn Jarir ibn Yazid al-Tabari. Arabic names include lineage information, sometimes across multiple generations (the father, grandfather and great grandfather).

=== Modern era ===
During the modern era many cultures around the world adopted family names, particularly for administrative reasons, especially during the age of European expansion and particularly since the 1600s. The Napoleonic Code, adopted in various parts of Europe, stipulated that people should be known by both their given name(s) and a family name that would not change across generations. Other notable examples include the Netherlands (1795–1811), Japan (1870s), Thailand (1920), and Turkey (1934). The structure of the Japanese name was formalized by the government as family name + given name in 1868.

In Breslau Prussia enacted the Hoym Ordinance in 1790, mandating the adoption of Jewish surnames. Napoleon also insisted on Jews adopting fixed names in a decree issued in 1808.

Names can sometimes be changed to protect individual privacy (such as in witness protection), or in cases where groups of people are escaping persecution. After arriving in the United States, European Jews, particularly those who fled Nazi persecution sometimes anglicized their surnames to avoid discrimination. Governments can also forcibly change people's names, as when the National Socialist government of Germany assigned German names to European people in the territories they conquered and intended to annex. In the 1980s, the People's Republic of Bulgaria forcibly changed the first and last names of its Turkish citizens to Bulgarian names.

== Origins of particular surnames ==
=== Patronymic and matronymic surnames ===
These are the oldest and most common type of surname. They may be a first name such as "Wilhelm", a patronymic such as "Andersen", a matronymic such as "Beaton", or a clan name such as "O'Brien". Multiple surnames may be derived from a single given name: e.g. there are thought to be over 90 Italian surnames based on the given name "Giovanni".

A family tree showing the Icelandic patronymic naming system

==== Examples ====
- Patronymics, matronymics or ancestral, often from a person's given name. e.g., from names: Richardson, Stephenson, Jones (Welsh for Johnson), Williams, Jackson, Wilson, Thompson, Benson, Johnson, Harris, Evans, Simpson, Willis, Davies, Reynolds, Adams, Dawson, Lewis, Rogers, Murphy, Morrow, Nicholson, Robinson, Powell, Ferguson, Davis, Edwards, Hudson, Roberts, Harrison, Watson, Madison (from Maud), or from a clan name (for those of Scottish origin, e.g., MacDonald, Forbes, Henderson, Armstrong, Grant, Cameron, Stewart, Douglas, Crawford, Campbell, Hunter) with "Mac" Gaelic for son.

=== Cognominal surnames ===
This is the broadest class of surnames, originating from nicknames, encompassing many types of origin. These include names based on appearance such as "Schwartzkopf", "Short", and possibly "Caesar", and names based on temperament and personality such as "Daft", "Gutman", and "Maiden", which, according to a number of sources, was an English nickname meaning "effeminate".

A group of nicknames look like occupational ones: King, Bishop, Abbot, Sheriff, Knight, etc. but it is rather unlikely that a person with surname King was a king or descended from a king. Bernard Deacon suggests that the first nickname/surname bearer may have acted like a king or bishop, or was as corpulent as a bishop. etc.

A considerable group of surname-producing nicknames may be found among ethnonymic surnames.

=== Ornamental/artificial surnames ===
Ornamental surnames (also known as artificial surnames) are not specific to any attribute (place, parentage, occupation, caste) of the first person to acquire the name. They were generally acquired later in history and generally when those without surnames needed them. In 1526, King Frederik I of Denmark-Norway ordered that noble families must take up fixed surnames, and many of them took as their name some element of their coat of arms; for example, the Rosenkrantz ("rose wreath") family took their surname from a wreath of roses forming the torse of their arms, and the Gyldenstierne ("golden star") family took theirs from a 7-pointed gold star on their shield. Ornamental surnames are more common in communities that adopted (or were forced to adopt) surnames in the 18th and 19th centuries. They occur commonly in Scandinavia, and among Sinti and Romani and Eastern Ashkenazi Jews in Germany and Austria.

=== Acquired/assigned surnames ===
During the era of the Trans-Atlantic slave trade many Africans were given new names by their enslavers. Many of the family names of African-Americans have their origins in slavery (i.e. slave name). Some freed slaves later created family names themselves.

Another category of acquired names is foundlings' names. Historically, children born to unwed parents or extremely poor parents would be abandoned in a public place or anonymously placed in a foundling wheel. Such abandoned children might be claimed and named by religious figures, the community leaders, or adoptive parents. Some such children were given surnames that reflected their condition, like (Italian) Esposito, Innocenti, Della Casagrande, Trovato, Abbandonata, or (Dutch) Vondeling, Verlaeten, Bijstand. Other children were named for the street/place they were found (Union, Liquorpond (street), di Palermo, Baan, Bijdam, van den Eyngel (shop name), van der Stoep, von Trapp), the date they were found (Monday, Septembre, Spring, di Gennaio), or festival/feast day they found or christened (Easter, SanJosé). Some foundlings were given the name of whoever found them.

=== Occupational surnames ===
Occupational names include Smith, Taylor (Tailor), Miller, Farmer, Thatcher, Shepherd, Potter and analogous names in other languages, for example, various surnames associated with the occupation of smith. There are also more complicated names based on occupational titles. In England it was common for servants to take the name (or modified version) of their employer, such as by adding the letter s to the word, although this formation could also be a patronymic. For instance, the surname Vickers is thought to have arisen as an occupational name adopted by the servant of a vicar, while Roberts could have been adopted by either the son or the servant of a man named Robert. A Dictionary of English Surnames says that "surnames of office, such as Abbot, Bishop, Cardinal and King, are often nicknames".

=== Toponymic surnames ===
Location (toponymic, habitation) names derive from the inhabited location associated with the person given that name. Such locations can be any type of settlement, such as homesteads, farms, enclosures, villages, hamlets, strongholds, or cottages. One element of a habitation name may describe the type of settlement. Examples of Old English elements are frequently found in the second element of habitational names. The habitative elements in such names can differ in meaning, according to different periods, different locations, or with being used with certain other elements. For example, the Old English element tūn may have originally meant "enclosure" in one name, but can have meant "farmstead", "village", "manor", or "estate" in other names.

Location names, or habitation names, may be as generic as "Monte" (Portuguese for "mountain"), "Górski" (Polish for "hill"), or "Pitt" (variant of "pit"), but may also refer to specific locations. "Washington", for instance, is thought to mean "the homestead of the family of Wassa", while "Lucci" means "resident of Lucca". Although some surnames, such as "London", "Lisboa", or "Białystok" are derived from large cities, more people reflect the names of smaller communities, as in Ó Creachmhaoil, derived from a village in County Galway. This is thought to be due to the tendency in Europe during the Middle Ages for migration to chiefly be from smaller communities to the cities and the need for new arrivals to choose a defining surname.

Arabic names sometimes contain surnames that denote the city of origin. For example, in cases of Saddam Hussein al Tikriti, meaning Saddam Hussein originated from Tikrit, a city in Iraq. This component of the name is called a nisbah.

=== Patronage ===
Patronal from patronage (Hickman meaning Hick's man, where Hick is a pet form of the name Richard) or strong ties of religion Kilpatrick (follower of Patrick) or Kilbride (follower of Saint Brigid of Kildare).

=== Other ===
The meanings of some names are unknown or unclear. The most common European name in this category may be the Irish name Ryan. A similar situation exists with the original meaning of Arthur. Other surnames may have arisen from more than one source: the name De Luca, for instance, likely arose either in or near Lucania or in the family of someone named Lucas or Lucius; in some instances, however, the name may have arisen from Lucca, with the spelling and pronunciation changing over time and with emigration. The same name may appear in different cultures by coincidence or romanization; the surname Lee is used in English culture, but is also a romanization of the Chinese surname Li. In the Russian Empire, illegitimate children were sometimes given artificial surnames rather than the surnames of their adoptive parents.

== Order of names ==
In many cultures (particularly in European and European-influenced cultures in the Americas, Oceania, etc., as well as West Asia/North Africa, South Asia, and most Sub-Saharan African cultures), the surname or family name ("last name") is placed after the personal, forename (in Europe) or given name ("first name"). In other cultures the surname is placed first, followed by the given name or names. The latter is often called the Eastern naming order because Europeans are most familiar with the examples from the East Asian cultural sphere, specifically, Greater China, Korea (both North and South), Japan, and Vietnam. This is also the case in Cambodia and among the Hmong of Laos and Thailand. The Telugu people of south India also place surname before personal name, and historically the Tamil people did the same. There are some parts of Europe, in particular Hungary, where the surname is placed before the personal name.

When people from areas using Eastern naming order write their personal name in the Latin alphabet, it is common to reverse the order of the given and family names for the convenience of Westerners, so that they know which name is the family name for official/formal purposes. Reversing the order of names for the same reason is also customary for the Mordvins and the Hungarians, but other Uralic peoples traditionally did not have surnames, perhaps because of the clan structure of their societies. The Samis, depending on the circumstances of their names, either saw no change or did see a transformation of their name. For example: Sire in some cases became Siri, and Hætta Jáhkoš Ásslat became Aslak Jacobsen Hætta – as was the norm.

Indian surnames may often denote village, profession or caste and are invariably mentioned along with the personal or first names. However, hereditary last names are not universal. In Telugu-speaking families in south India, surname is placed before the personal or first name and in most cases it is only shown as an initial (for example 'S.' for Suryapeth).

In English and other languages, although the usual order of names is "first middle last", for the purpose of cataloging in libraries and in citing the names of authors in scholarly papers, the order is changed to "last, first middle," with the last and first names separated by a comma, and items are alphabetized by the last name.

== Gender-specific versions of surname ==
In most Balto-Slavic languages (such as Latvian, Lithuanian, Bulgarian, Macedonian, Russian, Polish, Slovak, Czech, etc.) as well as in Greek, Irish, Icelandic, and Azerbaijani, some surnames change form depending on the gender of the bearer.

Forms of gendered names
Language	Male form	Female form	Reference
Icelandic patronymics	Suffix -son	Suffix -dóttir	
Greek surnames	Suffixes -os, -as, -is	Suffixes -ou, -a, -i	
Irish surnames	Prefixes Mac, Ó, Ua, Mag	Prefixes Bean Uí, Nic, Bean Mhic, Ní, Mhic, Nig	
Lithuanian surnames	Suffixes -as, -ys, -is, -us	Suffixes -ienė, -uvienė, -aitė, -utė, -iūtė, -ytė, -ė	
Latvian surnames	Suffixes -us, -is, -s, -iņš	Suffixes -a, -e, -iņa	
Scottish Gaelic surnames	Prefix Mac-	Prefix Nic-	
Bulgarian and Macedonian surnames	Suffixes -ov, -ev, -ski	Suffixes -ova, -eva, -ska	
East Slavic surnames and patronymics	Suffixes -ov, -ev, -in, -y, -iy, -oy, -yy, -ou Patronymics -ovich, -evich, -ovych, -yovych, -avich, -ich	Suffixes -ova, -eva, -ina, -aya, -a Patronymics -ovna, -evna, -ivna, -yivna, -auna, -euna, -ichna, -inichna	
Czech and Slovak surnames	Suffixes -ov, -ý, -ský, -cký	Suffixes -ová, -á, -ská, -cká	
Polish surnames	Suffixes -ski, -cki, -dzki	Suffixes -ska, -cka, -dzka	
Azerbaijani surnames and patronymics	Suffixes -ov, -yev Patronymic oğlu	Suffixes -ova, -yeva Patronymic qızı	
Turkmen surnames and patronymics	Suffixes -ow, -ýew Patronymics -owiç, -ýewiç	Suffixes -owa, -ýewa Patronymics -owna, -ýewna	

In Greece, if a man called Papadopoulos has a daughter or wife, she will likely be named Papadopoulou, the genitive form, as if the daughter/wife is "of" a man named Papadopoulos. Likewise, the surnames of daughters and wives of males with surnames ending in -as will end in -a, and those of daughters and wives of males with the -is suffix will have the -i suffix.

In Iceland, surnames have a gender-specific suffix (-dóttir = daughter, -son = son). Finnish used gender-specific suffixes up to 1929 when the Marriage Act forced women to use the husband's form of the surname. In 1985, this clause was removed from the act.

== Surname law ==
Surname laws vary around the world. Traditionally in many European countries for the past few hundred years, it was the custom or the law for a woman, upon marriage, to use her husband's surname and for any children born to bear the father's surname. If a child's paternity was not known, or if the putative father denied paternity, the newborn child would have the surname of the mother. That is still the custom or law in many countries. The surname for children of married parents is usually inherited from the father.

== Surname of women ==
King Henry VIII of England (reigned 1509–1547) ordered that marital births be recorded under the surname of the father.

The United States followed the naming customs and practices of English common law and traditions until recent times. The first known instance in the United States of a woman insisting on the use of her birth name was that of Lucy Stone in 1855, and there has been a general increase in the rate of women using their birth name. Beginning in the latter half of the 20th century, traditional naming practices (writes one commentator) were recognized as "com[ing] into conflict with current sensitivities about children's and women's rights". Those changes accelerated a shift away from the interests of the parents to a focus on the best interests of the child. The law in this area continues to evolve today mainly in the context of paternity and custody actions.

Naming conventions in the US have gone through periods of flux, however, and the 1990s saw a decline in the percentage of name retention among women. As of 2006, more than 80% of American women adopted the husband's family name after marriage.

In 1979, the United Nations adopted the Convention on the Elimination of All Forms of Discrimination Against Women ("CEDAW"), which declared in effect that women and men, and specifically wife and husband, shall have the same rights to choose a "family name", as well as a profession and an occupation.

In some places, civil rights lawsuits or constitutional amendments changed the law so that men could also easily change their married names (e.g., in British Columbia and California). Québec law permits neither spouse to change surnames.

In France, until 1 January 2005, children were required by law to take the surname of their father. Article 311-21 of the French Civil code now permits parents to give their children the family name of either their father, mother, or hyphenation of both – although no more than two names can be hyphenated. In cases of disagreement, both names are used in alphabetical order. This brought France into line with a 1978 declaration by the Council of Europe requiring member governments to take measures to adopt equality of rights in the transmission of family names, a measure that was echoed by the United Nations in 1979.

Similar measures were adopted by West Germany (1976), Sweden (1982), Denmark (1983), Finland (1985) and Spain (1999). The European Community has been active in eliminating gender discrimination. Several cases concerning discrimination in family names have reached the courts. Burghartz v. Switzerland challenged the lack of an option for husbands to add the wife's surname to his surname, which they had chosen as the family name when this option was available for women. Losonci Rose and Rose v. Switzerland challenged a prohibition on foreign men married to Swiss women keeping their surname if this option was provided in their national law, an option available to women. Ünal Tekeli v. Turkey challenged prohibitions on women using their surname as the family name, an option only available to men. The Court found all these laws to be in violation of the convention.

From 1945 to 2021 in the Czech Republic women by law had to use family names with the ending -ová after the name of their father or husband (so-called přechýlení). This was seen as discriminatory by a part of the public. Since 1 January 2022, Czech women can decide for themselves whether they want to use the feminine or neutral form of their family name.

Couples sometimes keep their own last names but give their children hyphenated or combined surnames.

== Compound surnames ==
Compound surnames are a type of surname that contain more than one word, which may or may not be used with a hyphen.

=== English ===
Compound surnames in English and several other European cultures feature two (or occasionally more) words, often joined by a hyphen or hyphens. However, it is not unusual for compound surnames to be composed of separate words not linked by a hyphen, for example Iain Duncan Smith, a former leader of the British Conservative Party, whose surname is "Duncan Smith".

=== Chinese ===
Some Chinese surnames use more than one character, though such names are now rare. Compound surnames are becoming more common in urban areas, in China.

== Multiple surnames ==
=== Spanish-speaking countries ===
In Spain and in most Spanish-speaking countries, the custom is for people to have two surnames, with the first surname coming from the father and the second from the mother. For example, if José García Torres and María Acosta Gómez had a child named Pablo, then his full name would be Pablo García Acosta.

José García Torres	María Acosta Gómez
	Pablo García Acosta

In Spain, feminist activism pushed for a law approved in 1999 that allows an adult to change the order of their family names, and parents can also change the order of their children's family names if they (and the child, if over 12) agree, although this order must be the same for all their children.

In Spain, a woman does not generally change her legal surname when she marries. In some Spanish-speaking countries in Latin America, a woman may, on her marriage, drop her mother's surname and add her husband's surname to her father's surname using the preposition de ("of"), del ("of the", when the following word is masculine) or de la ("of the", when the following word is feminine). For example, if "Clara Reyes Alba" were to marry "Alberto Gómez Rodríguez", the wife could use "Clara Reyes de Gómez" as her name (or "Clara Reyes Gómez", or, rarely, "Clara Gómez Reyes". She can be addressed as Sra. de Gómez corresponding to "Mrs Gómez"). Feminist activists have criticized this custom as they consider it sexist.

==== Compound surnames ====
Beyond the seemingly "compound" surname system in the Spanish-speaking world, there are also true compound surnames. These true compound surnames are passed on and inherited as compounds. For instance, former chairman of the Supreme Military Junta of Ecuador, General Luis Telmo Paz y Miño Estrella, has Luis as his first given name, Telmo as his middle name, the true compound surname Paz y Miño as his first (i.e. paternal) surname, and Estrella as his second (i.e. maternal) surname. Luis Telmo Paz y Miño Estrella is also known more casually as Luis Paz y Miño, Telmo Paz y Miño, or Luis Telmo Paz y Miño. He would never be regarded as Luis Estrella, Telmo Estrella, or Luis Telmo Estrella, nor as Luis Paz, Telmo Paz, or Luis Telmo Paz. This is because "Paz" alone is not his surname.

Map of most common surnames in the United States by state

== Prevalence of particular surnames ==
In the United States, 1,712 surnames cover 50% of the population, and about 1% of the population has the surname Smith, the most common American surname.

According to some estimates, 85% of China's population shares just 100 surnames. The names Wang (王), Zhang (张), and Li (李) are the most frequent.

The surname Silva is by far the most common surname in Brazil and Portugal, forming the basis of Brazilian onomastics. The surname is borne by 34,030,104 Brazilians. This colossal number represents 16.76% of the total population analyzed, consolidating Silva as the most fundamental and widespread surname in the country.

== See also ==
- Dit name
- Genealogy
- Generation name
- Irish name
- Legal name
- List of family name affixes
- Lists of most common surnames
- Maiden and married names
- Matriname
- Name blending
- Name change
- Naming law
- One-name study
- Skin name
- Spanish naming customs
- Surname extinction
- Surname map
- Surnames by country
- Tussenvoegsel
- Van
- Von
