= Sarah Lawson (actress) =

English actress (1928–2023)

- Born: Sarah Elizabeth Lawson; 6 August 1928; Wandsworth, London, England
- Died: 18 August 2023 (aged 95)
- Education: Webber Douglas Academy of Dramatic Art
- Occupation: Actress
- Years active: 1951–1990
- Spouse: Patrick Allen (m. 1960; died 2006)
- Children: 2

Sarah Elizabeth Lawson (6 August 1928 – 18 August 2023) was an English actress, best known for her film and television roles.

== Early life ==
Sarah Elizabeth Lawson was the youngest of three children born to Edith (née Monteith) and Noel John Charles Lawson (1887–1964), a naval officer.

Lawson trained at Webber Douglas Academy of Dramatic Art, then worked in Perth, Ipswich, Felixstowe and London's West End.

== Film ==
Lawson's films have included The Browning Version (1951), The World Ten Times Over and The Devil Rides Out. Her radio work included The Hostage, Inspector West and Kind Sir.

Among her most memorable film appearances was as Marie Eaton in Hammer's The Devil Rides Out (1968), in which her husband Patrick Allen provided the dubbing for actor Leon Greene. She and Allen also starred together in the science fiction thriller Night of the Big Heat (1967). Both films were directed by Terence Fisher.

== Television ==
Lawson's work on television included Time and the Conways, An Ideal Husband, Rupert of Hentzau, Corridors of Power, The White Guard, Crown Court (TV series) ('No Smoke without Fire'), The Odd Man, 'The Trollenberg Terror', (vide (Latin) The Trollenberg Terror film adaptation), Bergerac, and Zero One. She made guest appearances in such series as The Buccaneers (1956 TV series), The Avengers, The Saint, Gideon's Way, The Professionals, The Persuaders!, Danger Man, Jason King (TV series) and Callan.

Lawson's most significant television work was in the Granada TV series The Odd Man, starring Moultrie Kelsall and Edwin Richfield, and written by TV writer Edward Boyd. She also appeared as Soviet spy Flo Mayhew in two episodes of the series Callan, starring Edward Woodward.

Lawson played the prison governor in the final season of Within These Walls, in 1978, becoming the third actress after Googie Withers and Katherine Blake to play the role.

== Personal life and death ==
In 1960, she married actor Patrick Allen: the couple had two sons, Stephen and Stuart. Allen and Lawson remained married until his death in July 2006.

Sarah Lawson died of cancer on 18 August 2023, at the age of 95.

== Selected filmography ==
- Face to Face (1951) – Myrtle Beringer (live broadcast, 30 January that year) (Diana Dors' TV. début)
- The Browning Version (1951) – Betty Carstairs
- The Night Won't Talk (1952) – Sue / Susan
- Street Corner (1953) – WDC Joyce
- Three Steps in the Dark (1953) – Dorothy
- Meet Mr. Malcolm (1954) – Louie Knowles
- You Know What Sailors Are (1954) – Betty
- The Blue Peter (1955) – Gwyneth Thomas
- It's Never Too Late (1956) – Anne Hammond
- Three Crooked Men (1958) – May Wescott
- Links of Justice (1958) – Clare Mills
- The Solitary Child (1958) – Ann
- Night Without Pity (1962) – Diana Martin
- On the Run (1963) – Helen Carr
- The World Ten Times Over (1963) – Elizabeth
- Night of the Big Heat (1967) – Frankie Callum
- The Devil Rides Out (1968) – Marie Eaton
- Battle of Britain (1969) – Skipper's Wife
- The Stud (1978) – Anne Khaled
