= Inocencio (surname) =

Inocencio or Inocêncio is a surname. Notable people with the surname include:

- Cristina Inocencio (born 1969), Spanish botanist; her author abbreviation is "Inocencio"
- Jorge Inocêncio (born 1993), Portuguese footballer
- Kata Inocencio (born 1960), Philippine broadcast journalist, child rights advocate, television producer and host
- Mateus Facho Inocêncio (born 1981), Brazilian athlete
- Máximo Inocencio (1833–1896), Filipino architect and businessman
- Víctor García San Inocencio (born 1958), Puerto Rican lawyer and politician

== See also ==
- Igor Inocêncio de Oliveira (known as Igor Inocêncio; born 1998), Brazilian footballer
- Innocencio
- Innocent (name)
