= Ben Trovato =

The name Ben Trovato derives from Giordano Bruno's aphorism "se non è vero, è molto ben trovato". It may refer to

- A pseudonym of Samuel Lover
- A poem by Edwin Arlington Robinson
- Two of the homes of American author Byrd Spilman Dewey

== See also ==
- Bentrovata, a genus of flies
- Trovato (disambiguation)
