= Face to Face (1951 film) =

1951 British TV movie

- Written by: Emery Bonnett
- Starring: Diana Dors
- Country of origin: United Kingdom
- Original language: Enlglish

Production
- Production company: BBC

Original release
- Network: BBC
- Release: 30 January 1951

Face to Face is a 1951 British TV movie starring Diana Dors. It was performed live on the BBC on 30 January 1951 and was the first TV role for Dors. It was written by Emery Bonnett.

== Plot ==
Angel, a young stage performer in a song and dance act, falls in love with a rich older businessman. This upsets the businessman’s grown-up children.

== Cast ==
- Norman Tyrell as an author
- Diana Dors as Angel
- Robert Ayres as Craig Brown
- John Baker as A doorman
- John Gatrell as Vincent Granam
- Sarah Lawson (actress) as Myrtle Beringer
- Thea Holme as Grace Hassett
- Sonia Moray as A telegraph girl
- Elizabeth Gray as Serena Pentonville
- John Benson as Richard Beringer
- Claude Bonser as Blake
- Julian D’Albie as Arthur Beringer

== Reception ==
The Evening Standard said the play "presented a curious, slightly confusing, but not altogether unsuccessful sort of three dimensional modern morality play."
