= Innocence (Sennen EP) =

EP by Sennen
- Released: September 13, 2010
- Genre: Alternative Rock, Shoegazing, Post-Rock, Dream Pop
- Label: Hungry Audio

Sennen chronology
Age of Denial (2010)	Innocence (2010)

Professional ratings
Review scores
Source	Rating
Roomthirteen	10/13 stars

Innocence is an EP by the Norwich, UK band Sennen, released in the US on September 13, 2010.

== Track listing ==
1. "Innocence"
2. "SOS"
3. "Don't Put Your Love to Waste"
4. "December"
5. "Sennen's Week Away"
