= The Diana Dors Show =

British variety-comedy television series

The Diana Dors Show is a British variety-comedy television show that ran from 1959 to 1961. It starred Diana Dors and her then-husband Richard Dawson. It was made when Dors' film career was in decline.

The series premiered in May 1959. The Manchester Guardian called it "vapid and amateurish beyond belief".
