= Danny Street =

Scottish singer (1941–2010)

Danny Street (born Joseph Wilson Drysdale; 22 April 1941 – 21 April 2010) was a Scottish session singer and big band singer.

== Life ==
He was born in Stirling, Scotland in 1941, son of a butcher, and educated at Stirling High School. While an apprentice electrician he studied singing. From November 1962, as Danny Street, he was the vocalist with the Johnny Howard Band, which was heard regularly on Easy Beat on BBC radio. He left the band in 1969, and as a solo artist he often sang with the BBC Radio Orchestra conducted by Malcolm Lockyer. He also recorded songs for film soundtracks, including the title themes for Don't Raise the Bridge, Lower the River (1968) and Bedtime with Rosie (1974).

He recorded "Oh My Maria" which was written by David Myers and John Worsley and released on CBS in 1970. It was arranged by Johnny Arthey and produced by Teddy White, and backed with "In the Dead of Night".

Danny Street was described as the British Jack Jones. He was heard many times on the BBC radio programme Big Band Special, which began in 1979. His music was often arranged by Steve Gray, whom he had met in the Johnny Howard Band.

As a member of the Cliff Adams Singers he was heard in Sing Something Simple on BBC Radio 2 for 14 years. He was in backing groups on TV programmes including The Two Ronnies, The Val Doonican Show and The Des O'Connor Show.

He was married to Helenor; they had two daughters and a son.

It is thought that by 1985 Danny Street had made about 1,500 broadcasts. In that year he suffered a serious heart attack; after a year recovering, he returned to singing. In August 1992, after a broadcast concert of Big Band Special at the Theatre Royal, Plymouth, he suffered a second heart attack; three years later he retired to Clackmannanshire. He died of a heart attack on 21 April 2010.
