= Innocenti (surname) =

Innocenti is an Italian surname.

== Geographical distribution ==
As of 2014, 87.5% of all known bearers of the surname Innocenti were residents of Italy (frequency 1:2,690), 4.0% of France (1:64,011), 3.4% of the United States (1:405,900), 2.0% of Brazil (1:397,111) and 1.1% of Argentina (1:155,998).

In Italy, the frequency of the surname was higher than national average (1:2,690) only in one region: Tuscany (1:218).

== People ==
- Adriana Innocenti (1926–2016), Italian actress
- Alessio Innocenti (born 1993), Argentine-born Italian association football player
- Antonio Innocenti (1915–2008), Italian cardinal
- Azeglio Innocenti (1866–?), Italian Olympic gymnast who competed at the 1906 Intercalated Games
- Camillo Innocenti (1871–1961), Italian painter
- Danilo Innocenti (1904–1949), Italian Olympic pole vaulter
- Dino Innocenti (1913–1971), Italian Olympic ice hockey player
- Duccio Innocenti (born 1975), Italian association football player
- Fabio Innocenti (born 1950), Italian volleyball player
- Ferdinando Innocenti (1891–1966), Italian businessman
- Filiberto Innocenti (1888–?), Italian Olympic gymnast who competed at the 1906 Intercalated Games
- Giovanni Innocenti (1888–1975), Italian footballer
- Marco Innocenti (born 1978), Italian sport shooter
- Marzio Innocenti (born 1958), Italian rugby union player
- Paulo Innocenti (1902–1983), Italian-Brazilian association football player
- Riccardo Innocenti (footballer, born 1943), Italian association football player
- Riccardo Innocenti (footballer, born 1974), Italian association football player

== See also ==
- Innocent (name)
