= The Innocents =

The Innocents or Innocents may refer to:

== Literature ==
- The Innocents (novel), a 1917 novel by Sinclair Lewis
- The Innocents (play), a 1950 play by William Archibald based on Henry James's The Turn of the Screw
- The Innocents (comic book), a 2010 comic book by Garth Ennis
- The Innocents, a 2012 novel by Francesca Segal
- The Innocents , a 2019 novel by Michael Crummey
- "Innocents", a 1992 short story by Ian McDonald

== Film and television ==
=== Film ===
- The Innocents (1961 film), a British film directed by Jack Clayton, based on The Turn of the Screw by Henry James and on Archibald's play
- The Innocents (1963 film) (Los inocentes), an Argentine-Spanish film directed by Juan Antonio Bardem
- The Innocents (1987 film) (Les Innocents), a French film directed by André Téchiné
- Innocents (film), a 2000 British television film directed by Peter Kosminsky
- The Dreamers (2003 film), a Bernardo Bertolucci film (released as (Les) Innocents in some countries)
- The Innocents (2016 film) (Les Innocentes), a French film directed by Anne Fontaine
- The Innocents (2021 film), a Norwegian film directed by Eskil Vogt
- The Innocents (2025 film) (Los inocentes), a Mexican-Peruvian film directed by Germán Tejada, based on Los inocentes by Oswaldo Reynoso

=== Television ===
==== Episodes ====
- "Innocents", Medici season 3, episode 4 (2019)
- "Innocents", Night Heat season 1, episode 22 (1985)
- "Innocents", The Good Wife season 7, episode 2 (2015)
- "The Innocents", Follyfoot series 2, episode 5 (1972)
- "The Innocents: Part 1" and "The Innocents: Part 2", Holby City series 7 episodes 44–45 (2005)
- "The Innocents", Lassie (1954) season 17, episode 5 (1970)
- "The Innocents", Law of the Plainsman episode 11 (1959)
- "The Innocents", Millennium season 3, episode 1 (1998)
- "The Innocents", Steven Seagal: Lawman season 2, episode 7 (2010)
- The Innocents (The Boys episode), season 1, episode 6 (2019)
- "The Innocents", The F.B.I. season 6, episode 7 (1970)
- "The Innocents", The Secret Life of Us season 3, episode 12 (2003)
- "The Innocents", The Waltons season 8, episode 5 (1979)
- "The Innocents", Without a Trace season 4, episode 7 (2005)

==== Shows ====
- The Innocents (TV series), a 2018 British supernatural series

== Music ==
=== Bands ===
- The Innocents (US band), a 1958–1964 pop group
- The Innocents (Australian band), a power-pop band formed in 1975
- The Innocents (UK band), a 1978–1980 punk band
- Les Innocents, a 1982–1999 French rock band

=== Albums and EPs ===
(in date order)

- Innocents (John Cooper Clarke EP), 1977
- The Innocents (Erasure album), 1988
  - Innocents (video), a 1989 concert video by Erasure
- Innocents (Only Living Witness album), 1996
- Innocents (Moby album), 2013
- The Innocents (Weyes Blood album), 2014

== Other uses ==
- Holy Innocents' Cemetery (Les Innocents), a disused cemetery in Paris
- Innocents (gang), a 19th-century outlaw gang of road agents from Montana
- The Holy Innocents, the children killed on King Herod's order

== See also ==
- Innocent (disambiguation), includes uses of The Innocent
- Innocence (disambiguation)
