= Three Steps in the Dark =

1953 film by Daniel Birt

- DVD cover
- Directed by: Daniel Birt
- Written by: Roger East; Brock Williams
- Produced by: Harold Richmond
- Starring: Greta Gynt; Hugh Sinclair; Sarah Lawson
- Cinematography: Hone Glendinning
- Edited by: Anne Barker
- Music by: Gilbert Vinter
- Production company: Corsair Pictures
- Distributed by: Associated British-Pathé
- Release date: 10 August 1953
- Running time: 61 minutes
- Country: United Kingdom
- Language: English

Three Steps in the Dark (also known as 3 Steps in the Dark) is a 1953 British second feature ('B') mystery film directed by Daniel Birt and starring Greta Gynt, Hugh Sinclair and Sarah Lawson. It was written by Roger East and Brock Williams.

== Plot ==
A rich but disliked uncle invites his relatives to a family reunion at his home. Once the gathering is complete, he announces enigmatically that he intends to change his will before he dies, should not one of the heirs fulfill a condition. Before he can do this, he is murdered. His niece, a detective story writer, has to put her theories into practice by solving a real-life murder mystery.

== Cast ==
- Greta Gynt as Sophie Burgoyne
- Hugh Sinclair as Philip Burgoyne
- Sarah Lawson as Dorothy
- Elwyn Brook-Jones as Wilbraham
- John Van Eyssen as Henry Burgoyne
- Nicholas Hannen as Arnold Burgoyne
- Hélène Cordet as Esme
- Alastair Hunter as Inspector Forbes
- Katie Johnson as Mrs. Riddle

== Production ==
The film was shot at the Kensington Studios in London with sets were designed by the art director Bernard Robinson.

== Reception ==
The Monthly Film Bulletin wrote: "The limitations of this low budget thriller, filmed within a four-week schedule, quickly make themselves apparent. With the exception of one brief location shot, the action is confined to interior sets (which gives the film rather the look of a television production) ; there is over-much talk and the plot, though stereotyped, seems unnecessarily involved. The French television actress Helene Cordet gives an attractive performance in her first screen part."

In Picturegoer, the reviewer "R.H.B." wrote: "Indifferently acted and directed, this fim, instead of scaring me to death, just bored me." In British Sound Films: The Studio Years 1928–1959 David Quinlan rated the film as "mediocre", writing: "Boring, very low-budget 'thriller'."

== Later history ==
Three Steps in the Dark appears to have been a programme closely following the standard whodunit template, with Today's Cinema offering the analysis: "The film has a measure of well tried appeal in the matter of 'spotting the killer' and in anticipating the surprise revelation of his identity in the climax. There is the usual touch of romance to complete the formula." There is no indication that the film was ever shown publicly again in cinemas or on television following its initial run.

The British Film Institute included the film on its "75 Most Wanted" list of missing British feature films, due in large part to interest from film historians in Birt's relatively brief directorial career, which was cut short by his death at the age of 47 in 1955. The National Film and Sound Archive in Australia subsequently informed the BFI it has the film.
