= Sennen (band) =

English rock band

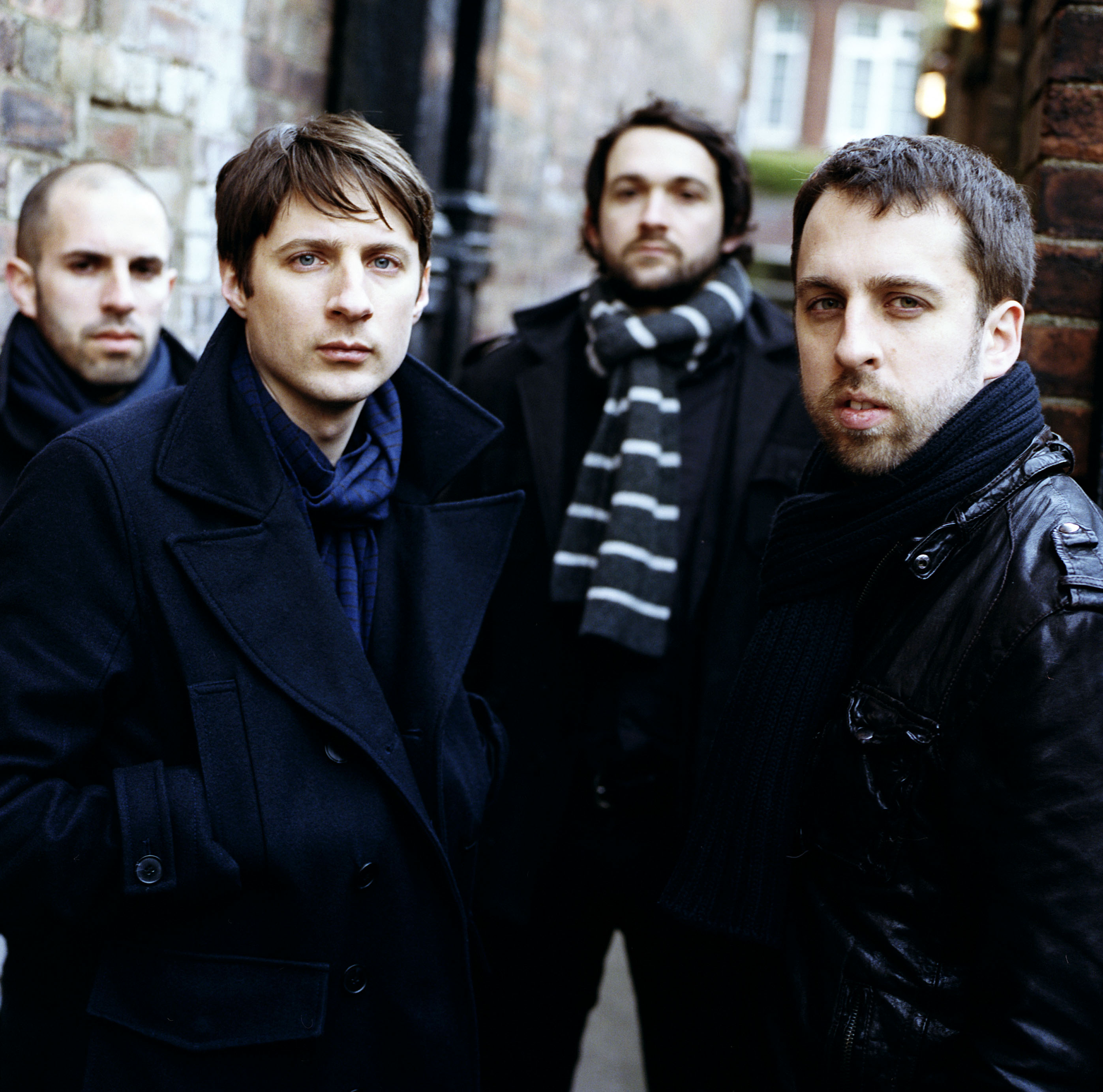

Background information
- Origin: Norwich, England
- Genres: Alternative rock, shoegazing, post-rock, dream pop, indie rock
- Years active: 2002–present
- Labels: Hungry Audio; Rallye; Minty Fresh; Indelabel; Sonic Cathedral
- Members: Rich Kelleway; Larry Holmes; James Brown; Tim Kelleway
- Past members: Andrew Horner
- Website: sennen.band

Sennen are an English alternative rock band from London, originally from Norwich. They consist of Larry Holmes (guitar, keys and vocals), Rich Kelleway (guitar and vocals), James Brown (drums and keys) and Tim Kelleway (bass). The band's uncorrupted, oddly schizophrenic style has won them a loyal following across the world, and seen their music appear on hit US TV dramas such as True Blood and One Tree Hill. The band are named after the Ride song "Sennen", originally released on the Today Forever EP.

== History ==
Sennen's first record Widows, a seven track mini-album, was released in late 2005 on the Hungry Audio label to critical acclaim and featured in Drowned In Sound's Top 50 Albums of 2005 where it was described as "a remarkably assured debut". In December 2005, American webzine Somewhere Cold ranked Widows No. 6 on their 2005 Somewhere Cold Awards Hall of Fame list. A largely instrumental and predominantly post-rock record, Widows displayed plenty of Sennen's early influences - ethereal soundscapes and dark atmospheric guitars building to the kind of epic crescendos produced by My Bloody Valentine, Mogwai and Spiritualized.

Sennen's first single release in 2007, the limited edition 7" "Blackout", was championed by Zane Lowe at Radio One and John Kennedy at XFM, earning the band supports with the likes of Explosions In The Sky, Ulrich Schnauss and Six By Seven. They recorded their debut album, Where the Light Gets In with Primal Scream/House of Love producer Pat Collier. Released in May 2008, the album retained Sennen's exhilarating sound but applied it to a more traditional song-based format, and the result was a record met with universal approval - "A piece of work that is most succinctly and accurately described as beautiful". Soon followed nationwide shows, festivals, and live radio sessions, and in October 2008 the band set off on a tour of Europe's major cities with dEUS.

Starting to reach a new audience in Europe, Japan and Taiwan, Sennen spent their time writing and recording the album, Age of Denial. During recording (December 2009 - again with Pat Collier), the Destroy Us EP was released and further critical acclaim ensued - as XFM's X-Posure's Hot One and The Sunday Times hottest download. Sennen's cover version of New Order’s "Bizarre Love Triangle" picked up radio play and was used in the US TV drama One Tree Hill.

Age of Denial was released in the UK in 2010. The NME proclaimed, "it straddles the Atlantic, assimilating US sun drenched harmony pop while espousing shoegazy noises from these shores". In 2011, Age of Denial was released in the US through Minty Fresh Records, and saw another inclusion in mainstream US television - the album track "S.O.S" featuring in hit drama True Blood.

Shortly before the UK release of Age of Denial in 2010, bassist Andrew Horner left the band and was replaced by guitarist Rich Kelleway's younger brother Tim. In mid 2011 Sennen went back into the studio to begin recording their third album Lost Harmony with The Cure producer Dave Allen. The album was released in early 2012 on Indelabel with the first single "Vultures" featuring as XFM's X-Posure's Hot One.

After a few years' hiatus, Sennen released their fourth album First Light in February 2016. Mastered by Sonic Boom (aka Peter Kember of Spacemen 3/Spectrum), First Light was described as "a collection of semi-psychedelic, elegant guitar pop, and their most complete album to date”.

In May 2021 Sennen announced the reissue of debut album Widows via Sonic Cathedral. Remastered by Slowdive's Simon Scott, the special expanded edition featured a number of previously unreleased tracks from the time, including lead single "40 Years".

In July 2026 Sennen announced the release of their first album in over 10 years New Quiet via Sonic Cathedral.

== Band members ==
=== Current ===
- Larry Holmes — vocals, guitar, keys
- Rich Kelleway — vocals, guitar
- James Brown — drums, keys
- Tim Kelleway — bass

=== Past ===
- Andrew Horner — bass

== Discography ==
=== Albums ===
- Widows (Hungry Audio, 2005)
- Where the Light Gets In (Hungry Audio, 2008)
- Age of Denial (Hungry Audio, 2010)
- Lost Harmony (Indelabel, 2012)
- First Light (Indelabel, 2016)
- Widows - Expanded Edition (Sonic Cathedral, 2021)
- New Quiet (Sonic Cathedral, 2026)

=== EPs ===
- Destroy Us (EP) (Hungry Audio, 2009)
- Innocence, (Hungry Audio, 2010)

=== Singles ===
- "Let You Down" (Hungry Audio, 2006)
- "A Life to Live" (Hungry Audio, 2007)
- "Blackout" (Hungry Audio, 2007)
- "Just Wanted to Know" (Hungry Audio, 2008)
- "Age of Denial" (Hungry Audio, 2010)
- "With You" (Hungry Audio, 2010)
- "Vultures" (Indelabel, 2012)
- "Forty Years" (Sonic Cathedral, 2021)
- "Here It Comes" (Sonic Cathedral, 2026)
- "Dig" (Sonic Catherdral, 2026)

=== Compilation appearances ===
- "40 Years" on Club AC30#4 (Club AC30, 2005)
- "I Couldn't Tell You" on WombatOnebat (NROne Records, 2006)
- "Hard to Take" on 50 Minutes (Exercise One, 2006)
- "Blackout" on Psychedelica 3 (Northern Star Records, 2008)
