= Bedtime with Rosie =

1975 British film by Wolf Rilla

- Still from the film
- Directed by: Wolf Rilla
- Written by: Ivor Burgoyne
- Produced by: Michael Fenton; Wolf Rilla
- Starring: Una Stubbs; Diana Dors; Ivor Burgoyne
- Cinematography: Mark McDonald
- Edited by: Bernard Gribble
- Music by: Roger Webb
- Release date: February 1975
- Running time: 76 minutes
- Country: United Kingdom
- Language: English

Bedtime with Rosie (also known as Rosie) is a 1975 British comedy-drama film directed by Wolf Rilla and starring Una Stubbs, Ivor Burgoyne and Diana Dors. It was written by Burgoyne. The onscreen title is simply Rosie, and the title song was performed by singer Danny Street.

== Plot ==
Rosie, a pregnant and highly imaginative single woman on her way from Liverpool to Holland, stays overnight with her Aunt Annie at her dingy London home. While there she is forced to share a bed with her aunt's lodger Harry, a reclusive and disillusioned bachelor, who initially disapproves of her lifestyle. Eventually Rosie and Harry strike up a relationship after she admits to being molested as a child and that her pregnancy is the result of rape by her boyfriend.

== Cast ==
- Una Stubbs as Rosie
- Ivor Burgoyne as Harry
- Diana Dors as Annie
- Johnny Briggs as man in cafe
- Margaret Heald as girl in cafe
- Tony Doonan as drunk
- Nicky Henson as fantasy man (uncredited)

== Critical reception ==
The Monthly Film Bulletin wrote:

Although not the skin-flick that its title advertises, nor the Rohmer-esque tale that its story suggests, Bedtime with Rosie does continually titillate its audience with the possibility that something either lewd or meaningful is about to occur. But nothing, on either count, ever really happens. The claustrophobia of the one-room set quickly suffocates any ambiguity about the characters while Rilla's static direction keeps the story's flirtation with deceptive appearance and sordid reality firmly anchored in the latter. Even though Harry turns out not to be the inexperienced fellow he claims to be, the script never really investigates the possible ethics of the circumstance (will and/or should Harry defend his "virginity" and principles), but instead emphasises the vulgar implications stemming from it. Outside of the amateur psychology that informs the dream sequences, the film is never funny, and for all of love's victories it is never touching.

In Offbeat: British Cinema's Curiosities, Obscurities and Forgotten Gems, Darrell Buxton wrote: "The basic thread of the simple storyline ... may offer little promise, yet the cast to keep it all lively and watchable/listenable, the set design is eye catching ... and Rilla offers an occasional flourish or unusual shot."
