= Trovato =

Trovato is a surname. Notable people with the surname include:

- Gerardina Trovato (born 1967), Italian singer-songwriter
- Mattia Trovato (born 1998), Italian football player

== See also ==
- Ben Trovato (disambiguation)
