= Giovanni Innocenti =

Italian footballer

Personal information
- Full name: Giovanni Innocenti
- Date of birth: 13 February 1888
- Place of birth: Asigliano Vercellese, Italy
- Date of death: December 1975 (aged 87)
- Place of death: France
- Position: Goalkeeper

Senior career*
Years	Team	Apps	(Gls)
1907–1915	Pro Vercelli	113	(0)

International career
1913–1914	Italy	5	(0)
- * Club domestic league appearances and goals

Giovanni Innocenti (Italian pronunciation: [dʒoˈvanni innoˈtʃɛnti]; 13 February 1888 – December 1975) was an Italian footballer who played as a goalkeeper. He represented the Italy national football team five times, the first being on 1 May 1913, the occasion of a friendly match against Belgium in a 1–0 home win.

== Honours ==
=== Player ===
Pro Vercelli

Italian Football Championship: 1908, 1909, 1910–11, 1911–12, 1912–13
