= The Innocent (Armchair Theatre) =

1960 British TV play in the Armchair Theatre series

- Armchair Theatre episode
- Episode no.: Season 3 Episode 87
- Directed by: Charles Jarrott
- Written by: Bob Kesten
- Original air date: May 8, 1960
- Running time: 60 mins

The Innocent is a 1960 British television play that aired as an episode of Armchair Theatre. It starred Diana Dors.

The play was especially written for Dors. It was her second British television play, following one for the BBC eight years previously. She was paid £1,000 to appear in the play, which was high at the time.

Dors sang two songs from her album Swinging Dors in the play.

== Premise ==
Jane Francis is a famous pop singer who is married to an artist, David Manning, with whom she shares a daughter, Susan. Family friend Sir Malcolm tells Jane that David is cheating on her with a model, Tina. Tina is murdered.

== Cast ==
- Diana Dors as Jane Francis
- Ian Hunter as Sir Malcolm Saville
- Patrick Macnee as David Manning
- Basil Dignam as Mr. Bradshaw
- Deborah Buchan (granddaughter of John Buchan) as Susan
- Geoffrey Denys as Clerk of the Court
- Denis Holmes as Detective Sergeant
- Cecily Hullett as Miss Emery
- Robert Raglan as Detective Superintendent
- Kynaston Reeves as Judge
- Yvonne Romain as Tina Fiori
- Nicholas Selby as Charles Seale

== Reception ==
The Liverpool Post said Dors "gives a first class dramatic performance. But I hope next time they will give her a more convincing vehicle for her talent."

The Leicester Mercury called it "an unremarkable crime play" and said Dors "run amok with... over acting."
