= Diana Dors =

English actress and singer (1931–1984)

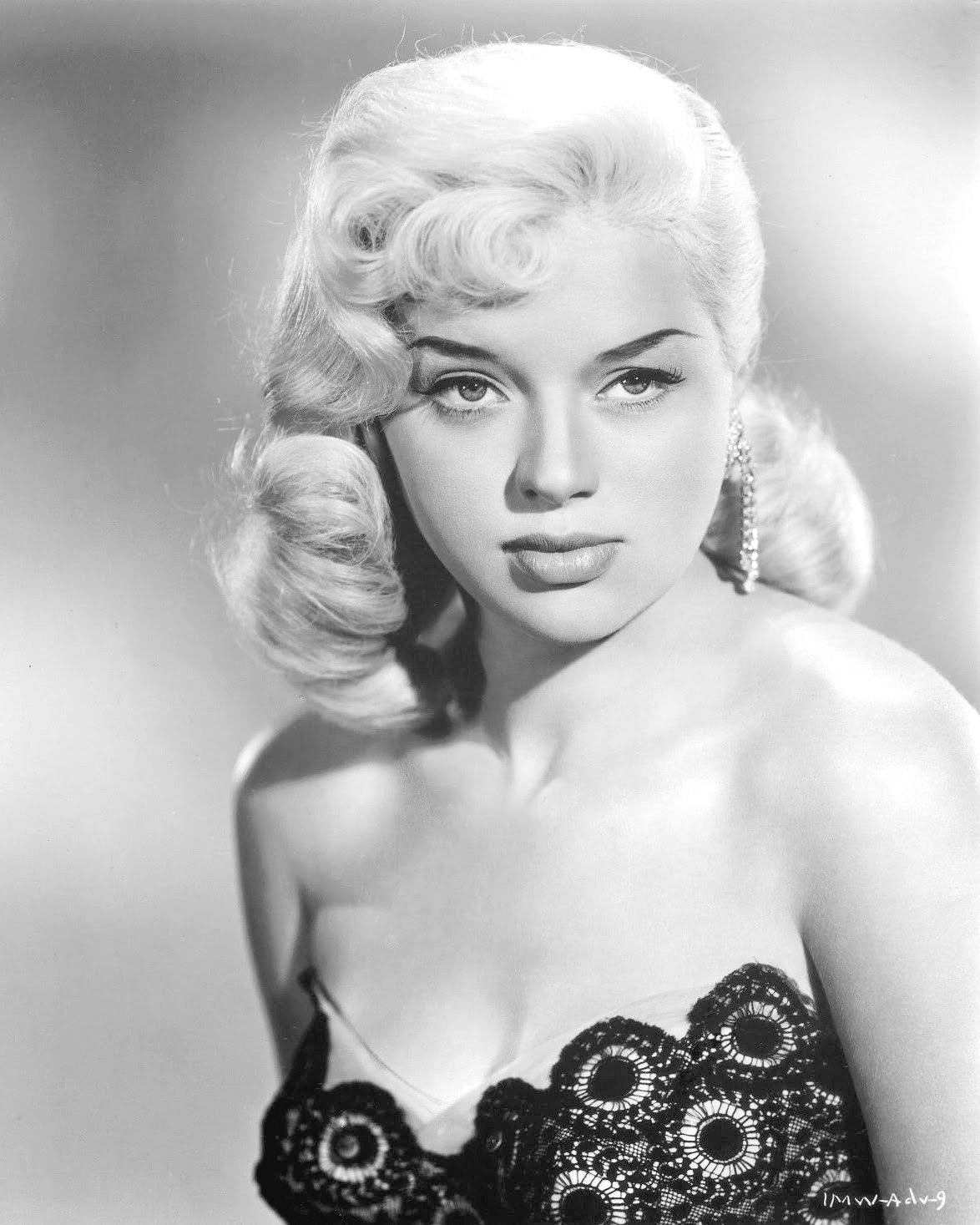
- Dors in 1955
- Born: Diana Mary Fluck; 23 October 1931; Swindon, Wiltshire, England
- Died: 4 May 1984 (aged 52); Windsor, Berkshire, England
- Resting place: Sunningdale Catholic Cemetery
- Education: London Academy of Music and Dramatic Art
- Occupations: Actress; TV personality; singer
- Years active: 1947–1984
- Spouses: Dennis Hamilton (m. 1951; died 1959) Richard Dawson (m. 1959; div. 1966) Alan Lake (m. 1968)
- Children: 3, including Mark Dawson

Diana Dors (born Diana Mary Fluck; 23 October 1931 – 4 May 1984) was an English actress and singer.

Dors came to public notice as a blonde bombshell, much in the style of Americans Marilyn Monroe, Jayne Mansfield, and Mamie Van Doren. Dors was promoted by her first husband, Dennis Hamilton, mostly in sex film-comedies and risqué modelling. After it was revealed that Hamilton had been defrauding her, she continued to play up to her established image, and she made tabloid headlines with the parties reportedly held at her house. Later, she showed talent as a performer on TV, in recordings, and in cabaret, and gained new public popularity as a regular chat-show guest. She also gave well-regarded film performances at different points in her career.

According to film critic David Thomson, "Dors represented that period between the end of the war and the coming of Lady Chatterley in paperback, a time when sexuality was naughty, repressed, and fit to burst."

== Early life ==
Diana Mary Fluck was born in Swindon, Wiltshire, on 23 October 1931 at the Haven Nursing Home. Her mother, (Winifred Maud) Mary, née Payne, was married to Albert Edward Sidney Fluck, a railway clerk, but she had been having an affair with another man, and when she announced she was pregnant with Diana, she admitted she had no idea if the other man or her husband was the father.

Diana was educated at a small, private school, Selwood House, on Bath Road, Swindon, from which she was eventually expelled. Diana would repeatedly talk and otherwise misbehave during French lessons, being given by an elderly Czech Jewish refugee, who admonished her, "Pay attention. After the war, you will be able to go on holiday to France and speak with the locals." She replied, "Who wants to go to silly old France anyway?" At this point, he threw a stick of chalk at her. She caught the chalk and threw it back at him, hitting him in the face, for which she was summarily expelled.

During the war, Diana dated a boy named Desmond Morris from the Boys' High School, also on Bath Road, Swindon. Morris, who was from one of the town's wealthier, more prominent families, used to take her aboard his rowing boat on the lake in his family's garden. The garden and lake later comprised Queen's Park in Swindon. In the late 1960s, Morris (a zoologist) became famous as the author of The Naked Ape and presenter of the TV series adapted from the book.

From the age of eight, her heroines became Hollywood actresses Veronica Lake, Lana Turner, and Jean Harlow, and she enjoyed going to the cinema to watch them.

Towards the end of the war, Dors entered a beauty contest, organized to find a pin-up girl for Soldier Magazine; she came in third. This led to work as a model in art classes, and she began to appear in such local theatre productions as A Weekend in Paris and Death Takes a Holiday.

== Early career ==
=== LAMDA ===
Having excelled in her elocution studies, after lying about her age, at 14 she was offered a place to study at London Academy of Music and Dramatic Art (LAMDA), becoming the college's youngest student, starting in January 1946.

She lodged at the Earl's Court YWCA, and supplemented her £2-per-week allowance, most of which was spent on her lodgings, by posing for the London Camera Club for one guinea (equivalent to £51 in 2024) an hour. Signed to the Gordon Harbord Agency in her first term, she won a bronze medal, awarded by Peter Ustinov, and in her second won a silver with honours.

=== First films ===
Just prior to LAMDA, Dors had unsuccessfully auditioned for the part of Kanchi in Black Narcissus that was played by Jean Simmons. She acted in public theatre pieces for LAMDA productions, one of which was seen by casting director Eric L'Epine Smith. He suggested Dors for what became the actress's screen debut in the noir film The Shop at Sly Corner (1947). Dors was cast in a walk-on role that developed into a speaking part. Her pay rate was £8 per day for three days.

During the signing of contracts, in agreement with her father, she changed her contractual surname to Dors, the maiden name of her maternal grandmother; this was at the suggestion of her mother Mary. Dors later commented on her name:

They asked me to change my name. I suppose they were afraid that if my real name Diana Fluck was in lights and one of the lights blew ...

Returning to LAMDA two weeks later, she was asked by her agent to audition for Holiday Camp (1947) by dancing a jitterbug with young actor John Blythe. Gainsborough Studios gave her the part at a rate of £10 per day for four days.

Dors's third film was Dancing with Crime (1947), shot at Twickenham Studios opposite Richard Attenborough during the coldest winter for nearly 50 years, for which she was paid £10 per day for 15 days.

Following her return to LAMDA, she graduated in spring 1947 by winning the London Films Cup, awarded to LAMDA by Sir Alexander Korda for the "girl most likely to succeed in films." Greta Gynt presented the award to her at a ceremony. Dors timed her return to Swindon to visit her parents with the local release of The Shop at Sly Corner.

== Rank Organisation ==
=== Charm School ===
At the age of 15, Dors signed a contract with the Rank Organisation, and joined J. Arthur Rank's "Charm School" for young actors, subsequently appearing in many of their films. The Charm School had been established by producer Sydney Box, whom Rank appointed head of production at Gainsborough Studios, one of the companies under the Rank umbrella. (Other students of the school who went on to become famous included Petula Clark, Claire Bloom, and Christopher Lee.) Dors disliked the Charm School, but received more publicity than other students at the time in part because of her willingness to be photographed in glamour shots and attending premieres. An August 1947 article said her nickname was "The Body".

Her first film under contract to Rank was Streets Paved with Water, where she was the fourth lead; filming started in July 1947, but was cancelled after a month. She had a small role as a maid in Gainsborough's The Calendar (1948), and a good part in Good-Time Girl (1948), as a troubled teen being warned at the beginning and end of the film. She then played the role of Charlotte in Rank's adaptation of Oliver Twist (1948), directed by David Lean.

Dors had a bigger part in a B film, Penny and the Pownall Case (1948), a 50-minute movie for Highbury Productions. This was her first significant role, the second female lead after Peggy Evans. Bob Monkhouse wrote in his memoirs that, when he saw the film in the cinema, he thought it was "really bad" but was impressed by Dors. "It was her energy that at first attracted me", he wrote. "Her acting was raw but promising and her vitality made me remember her afterwards as if her part of the screen had been in colour."

In August 1948, Rank announced Dors would be one of its young players that it would be building up into stars. (The others included David Tomlinson, Susan Shaw, Patricia Plunkett, Sally Ann Howes, and Derek Bond.) In September, she was in A Boy, a Girl and a Bike (1949) by which stage her fee was £30 a week; she says that the movie took six months to shoot.

After a bit in My Sister and I (1948), Dors was given a showy comic-support part in Here Come the Huggetts (1948), a series that followed Holiday Camp, playing the lazy niece of the Huggetts, who causes trouble when she goes to stay with the family. Dors was so well received that she returned for the second movie in the series, Vote for Huggett (1949). Both were produced by Betty E. Box, who recalled, "Diana was all woman", despite only being a teenager. "She thought like a woman, acted like a woman, and looked like a woman." She was also in It's Not Cricket (1949).

David Shipman later argued that when Dors "was young she was very funny: she did a neat parody of the man-mad teenager, the nubile cousin who ogles the best man at the wedding breakfast, the office junior ready for a bit of slap and tickle behind the filing cupboard. She was the best thing about most of her early films."

=== Leading lady ===
Rank promoted Dors to leading roles in 1949's Diamond City, the story of a boom town in South Africa in 1870. Jean Kent was originally cast as a saloon owner in love with hero David Farrar, who loves a missionary played by Honor Blackman; Kent turned down the role and Dors took over. Filming took place in late 1948 and early 1949, when Dors was only 17 years old. She was paid £30 a week. She says the part of "Diana" in The Blue Lamp was written for her, but she lost it to Peggy Evans when the director decided he wanted "a waif type"; she also tested for the female lead in The Cure for Love, but lost out to Dora Bryan.

While waiting for Diamond City to come out, Rank sent Dors to appear with Barbara Murray in The Cat and the Canary at the Connaught Theatre, Worthing. She then appeared on stage in The Good Young Man with Digby Wolfe and in September 1949, with Marcel Le Bon in a touring production of Lisette, a three-act play by Douglas Sargeant.

In November 1949, Dors was contracted out to Ealing Studios, which put her in Dance Hall (1950), as one of the four female leads, along with Natasha Perry, Petula Clark, and Jane Hylton. Dors later called it "a ghastly film – quite one of the nastiest I ever made", although she received good personal reviews.

In February 1950, she went into the play Man of the World with Roger Livesey and Lionel Jeffries, directed by Kenneth Tynan, which opened at the Shakespeare Memorial Theatre. It only had a short run, but she received strong personal notices and was awarded Theatre World magazine's Actress of the Year award.

Diamond City flopped at the box office, though, and with Rank now £18 million (equivalent to £715 million in 2024) in debt, Rank closed their Charm School and made Dors redundant in September 1950. David Shipman argued that "though the Rank Organization knew how to put Dors through its Charm School paces, they had no idea how to handle such an individual talent."

== British stardom ==
Dors landed the female lead supporting Ronald Shiner in Worm's Eye View (1951), a comedy that was one of the most popular movies of 1951 in Britain; her fee was £250. She had a leading role in a TV movie for the BBC, Face to Face (1951) then appeared in two plays – Miranda at Stratford, and Born Yesterday at Henley. She auditioned for the lead in Lady Godiva Rides Again and was turned down because it was felt she did not appeal to men and women, but she was given a support role. She later said her fee of £750 helped restore her financial situation.

=== Dennis Hamilton ===
With her boyfriend in jail and having just undergone her first abortion, Dors met Dennis Hamilton Gittins in May 1951 while filming Lady Godiva Rides Again for Rank, a film that has uncredited appearances by Joan Collins and Ruth Ellis (then four months pregnant). (Dors described herself as "the only sex symbol Britain has produced since Lady Godiva".) The couple married five weeks later at Caxton Hall on Monday, 3 July 1951.

Later that month, Dors starred in a British film noir The Last Page (1952), directed by Terence Fisher for Hammer Films in association with producer Robert L. Lippert; her fee was £450 for four weeks' work. Lippert reportedly offered Dors a one-picture deal on condition that she divorce Hamilton, but Dors refused.

Dors often played characters suffering from unrequited love, and by the mid-1950s, she was known as "the English Marilyn Monroe". Hamilton also made sure that she had the lifestyle attachments of a sex symbol, agreeing to a lease-deal with Rolls-Royce such that a headline could be created in the tabloids that, at the age of 20, she was the youngest registered keeper of a Rolls-Royce in the UK.

Hamilton went to great lengths to advance Dors's career and his income or influence from it. After her death, friends and biographers said that Hamilton would lend Dors as a sexual favour to hiring producers and leading actors, much as in the "casting couch" practices of Hollywood.

Dors worked with Terry-Thomas on the TV series How Do You View? for £250. The Sunday Times called her a "charming addition to his crazy household."

In December 1951, a newspaper reported that the "likeliest British names for glamour in 1952 are probably Britain's Glynis Johns and plumpish Diana Dors. Both are going to Hollywood." She gained a second offer from Burt Lancaster for a lead role in his His Majesty O'Keefe (1954), but this time Hamilton turned down the part on her behalf before she even knew of the offer. The result was that her early career was restricted to mainly British films.

=== Theatre and Maurice Elvey ===
In April 1952, Dors appeared in a stage revue with Wally Chrisham, Rendezvous, which eventually made it to London.Variety said in May she made the "only noteworthy contribution" to the play, which ultimately only had a short run. However under Hamilton's guidance she received enormous publicity. Dors later said these reviews, in addition to Hamilton's publicity, helped turn her career around. Dors later said Hamilton "promoted me strictly as a sex symbol, never as an actress, but it served its purpose and at the time it was fun."

Laurence Olivier reportedly offered her a role in The Beggar's Opera, but Dors says the start date kept changing. Instead, she accepted an offer to appear in a show in Blackpool, Life with Lyons at a fee of £100 a week for three months. The Times newspaper reported on Tuesday 28 July 1953 (page 2) that Diana (under her married name Diana Mary Gittins) received an absolute discharge after being convicted of the theft of several bottles of spirits from a friend's flat in Blackpool.

Dors's film career started to improve when she was cast in a support role in My Wife's Lodger (1952), directed by Maurice Elvey, who subsequently cast her in a small role in another low-budget comedy called The Great Game (1953) made by Adelphi Films.

In December 1952, Dors appeared on stage in It Remains to be Seen, which only ran seven performances. The Observer said Dors "bangs at it with goodwill." The Daily Telegraph said she "carries blondeness to its ultimate pitch, works very hard, and is likeable as a good-hearted little trollop."

In March 1953, Dors did a cabaret act in Glasgow. Variety said she showed "little ability to be a personality act." She began touring a variety act and performed variations of this act throughout her career.

Adelphi were impressed by Dors, announcing in February 1953 that they had bought the screen rights to the popular play Is Your Honeymoon Really Necessary? (1953) as a vehicle for Dors; it was directed by Elvey in April. Her fee was £1,000 for four weeks work. She was paid that for another comedy, It's a Grand Life (1953) with Frank Randle.

Dors had a supporting part for Hammer in The Saint's Return (1954). In September 1953 the producer of that movie, Julian Lesser, announced he had an option for Dors's services on two more movies.

=== British stardom ===
Dors's career stepped up another level when she was cast in a supporting role alongside Glynis Johns in a prison drama, The Weak and the Wicked (1954), directed by J. Lee Thompson. She made the movie in August 1953, only a few weeks after having been convicted in real life of stealing alcohol from a friend's house. By this stage she was earning a reported £12,000 a year. When the film came out, it was a big hit in Britain and earned Dors some excellent reviews.

She played Aladdin as a Christmas pantomime in 1953 and did The Lovely Place for Rheingold Theatre on TV. In April 1954 she said "I'm picking and choosing my parts now. That doesn't mean I'm waiting for the perfect part, but I'm sick to death of being the sexy siren."

In 1954, Hamilton had the idea of exploiting the newly printed technology of 3D. He engaged photographer Horace Roye to take a number of nude and seminude photographs of Dors, which Hamilton subsequently had published in two forms; the semi-nude pictures were issued as a set called "Diana Dors 3D: the ultimate British Sex Symbol", which was sold together with a pair of 3D glasses; the full-nude test shot photographs became part of Roye's booklet London Models (1954). Police pressed charges, alleging the books were obscene but a court ruled that they were not.

Adelphi called her back for Miss Tulip Stays the Night (1955) for a fee of £1,500. She then played one of the leads in A Kid for Two Farthings (1955), directed by Carol Reed in mid-1954 for Alex Korda, paid £1,700; the film was one of the most popular movies of 1955 in Britain. Dors was offered the female lead in Thompson's As Long as They're Happy (1955) with Jack Buchanan, but was unable to accept; she agreed to do a guest role, instead, at £200 a day. Filmink argued "she steals the film."

In October 1954, questions were asked in Parliament about why she was allowed to claim her mink coat as a tax deduction.

In December 1954, she reportedly turned down a seven-year contract with Rank worth £100,000 (equivalent to £3.27 million in 2024) because she could make more freelance. She did sign a three-picture deal with Rank worth £15,000 (equivalent to £491,000 in 2024). The first of these was Value for Money (1955) for director Ken Annakin starring with John Gregson, filmed in early 1955, and An Alligator Named Daisy (1955), directed by Thompson, also for Rank, starring Donald Sinden.

The success of her movies, particularly Kid for Two Farthings, led to British exhibitors voting her the ninth-most popular British star at the box office in 1955 – the sole female star in the top 10. She ranked after Dirk Bogarde, John Mills, Norman Wisdom, Alastair Sim, Kenneth More, Jack Hawkins, Richard Todd, and Michael Redgrave, and in front of Alec Guinness. In November 1955 the press criticised her for wearing revealing necklines when meeting royalty.

Dors made a fourth film with Thompson, Yield to the Night (1956), filmed in late 1955. It was a crime drama with Dors playing a role similar to Ruth Ellis. She received some of the best reviews of her career. She was acclaimed at the 1956 Cannes Film Festival. J. Lee Thompson said he cast Dors in Yield over the objections of the studio who wanted Olivia de Havilland adding in May 1956 that "I must find a new part for Diana Dors. I'm looking for one all the time. It isn't easy because you can't take chances with Diana – not any more..." But she would never work with Thompson again.

Dors turned down the female lead in Rank's The Big Money. On being offered that role and turning it down, she said:

If that's the best you can offer, then I'm rather surprised […] They still think I'm only good for the dumb blonde parts I played five years ago, I thought everyone in the business knew I'd come some way since then.

She later said:

After I did Yield to the Night, it [all the publicity] went a bit sour. It should have been toned down to give me the chance to become a serious actress.

== Hollywood ==
=== RKO ===
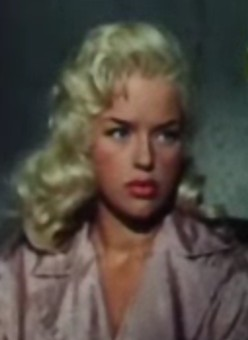
Dors in The Unholy Wife (1957)

Dors's performance attracted interest in Hollywood. In February 1956, she guest-starred on a TV special Bob Hope made in England.

In May 1956, Dors signed a contract with RKO to support George Gobel in I Married a Woman. She left Southampton on board the Queen Elizabeth for New York City and then to Hollywood. She said:

I'm hoping to enjoy myself, keep my sense of fun and do a good job. It took me 10 years [of] hard work in poor[ly received] pictures, in revue, in straight plays, and touring to become a star, and I don't intend to let Hollywood push me about, crop my hair, change my style or personality.

In July 1956, Dors—through her company, Treasure Pictures—signed a contract with RKO Pictures to make three more movies, the first of which was to be The Unholy Wife (1957) with Rod Steiger, which started filming in September. Her fee was a reported $75,000 (equivalent to $679,000 in 2025), with the other films to go up $25,000. Dors reportedly had an affair with Rod Steiger during the filming of The Unholy Wife. In October 1956, Hamilton started an affair with Raymond "Mr. Teasy-Weasy" Bessone's estranged wife in London. In November, Dors announced Hamilton and she were separating. Dors later said, "They tried getting me in the gas chamber again in Hollywood [...] but [the film] wasn't good. They edited it badly."

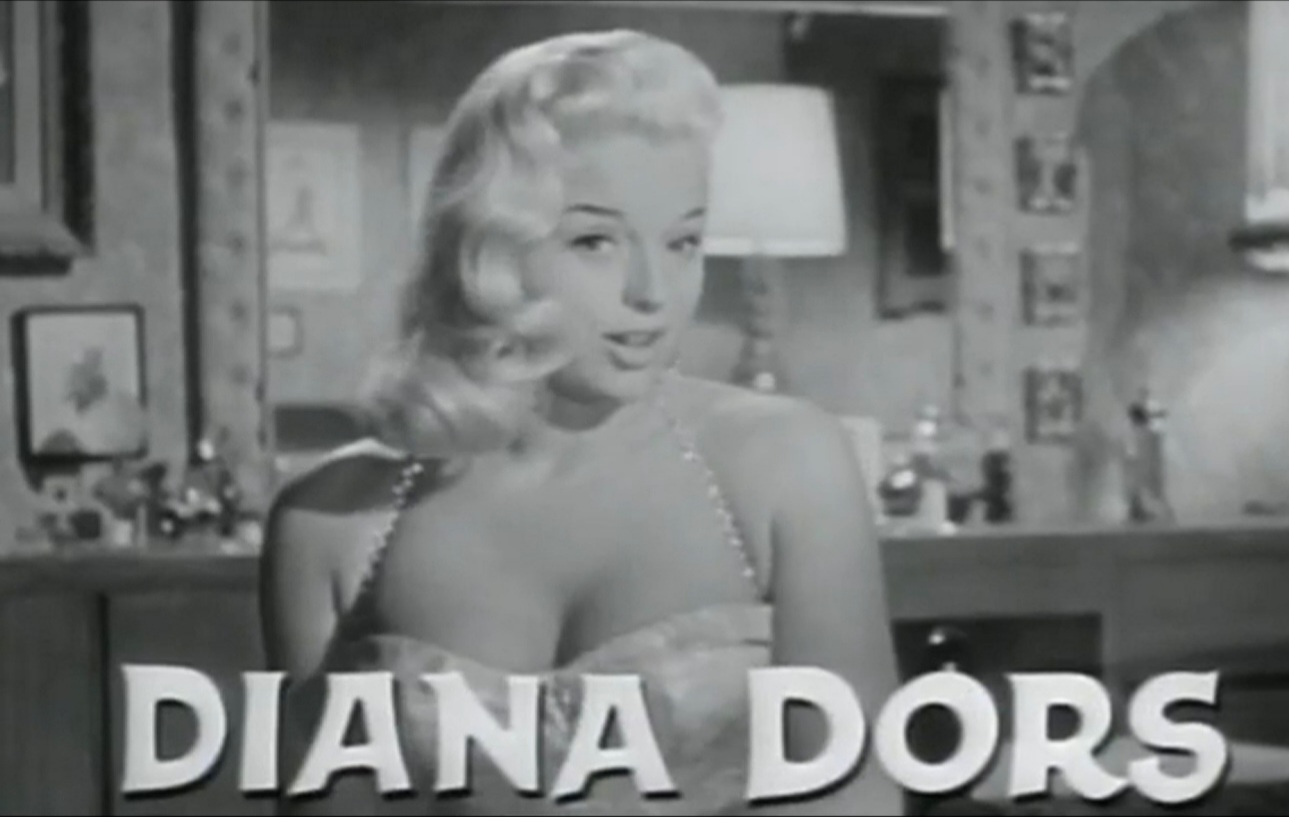
Dors in I Married a Woman (1958)

William Dozier of RKO announced Dors would star in Blondes Prefer Gentlemen with Eddie Fisher, but the film was never made. In August 1956, she announced she had signed a one-picture deal to appear in a Bob Hope movie. This never happened; neither did a project Robert Aldrich announced he wanted to make with Dors and Paul Douglas at UA, Potluck for Pomeroy.

Due to meet Hollywood columnists Hedda Hopper and Louella Parsons, interviews were arranged to be held at the Hollywood home of her friend, celebrity hairdresser Mr. Teasy-Weasy, who owned a Spanish-style villa off Sunset Boulevard, formerly owned by Marlene Dietrich. To coincide with the publication of the articles, Hamilton and Raymond arranged a Hollywood launch party at Raymond's house in August 1956, with a guest list that included Doris Day, Eddie Fisher, Zsa Zsa Gabor, Liberace, Lana Turner, Ginger Rogers, and John Wayne. After 30 minutes, while lining up next to Raymond's pool with her US agent Louis Shurr and her dress designer Howard Shoup, all four, including Dors and Hamilton, were pushed into the pool after the party crowd and photographers surged forward. Hamilton emerged from the pool and hit the first photographer before he could be restrained. The headlines in the National Enquirer read: "Miss Dors Go Home—And Take Mr. Dors With You". Because of the resulting negative publicity, the couple failed to buy Lana Turner's house, settling into a rental property in Coldwater Canyon.

She was meant to make three films produced by Anna Neagle, the first with Frankie Vaughan called The Cast Iron Shore; however, Dors pulled out in September.

In October, Dors appeared again on the Bob Hope Show. The New York Times said she "displayed considerable stage presence. The gal can handle her lines." Hedda Hopper reported around this time that Dors had replaced her agent "and her popularity is slipping even before her first film is shown." Hopper also said Dors's fee for British films was now $40,000, up from $20,000. In November, Dors, returning to London, announcing she and Hamilton had separated, with the latter blaming Steiger.

=== Return to Britain ===
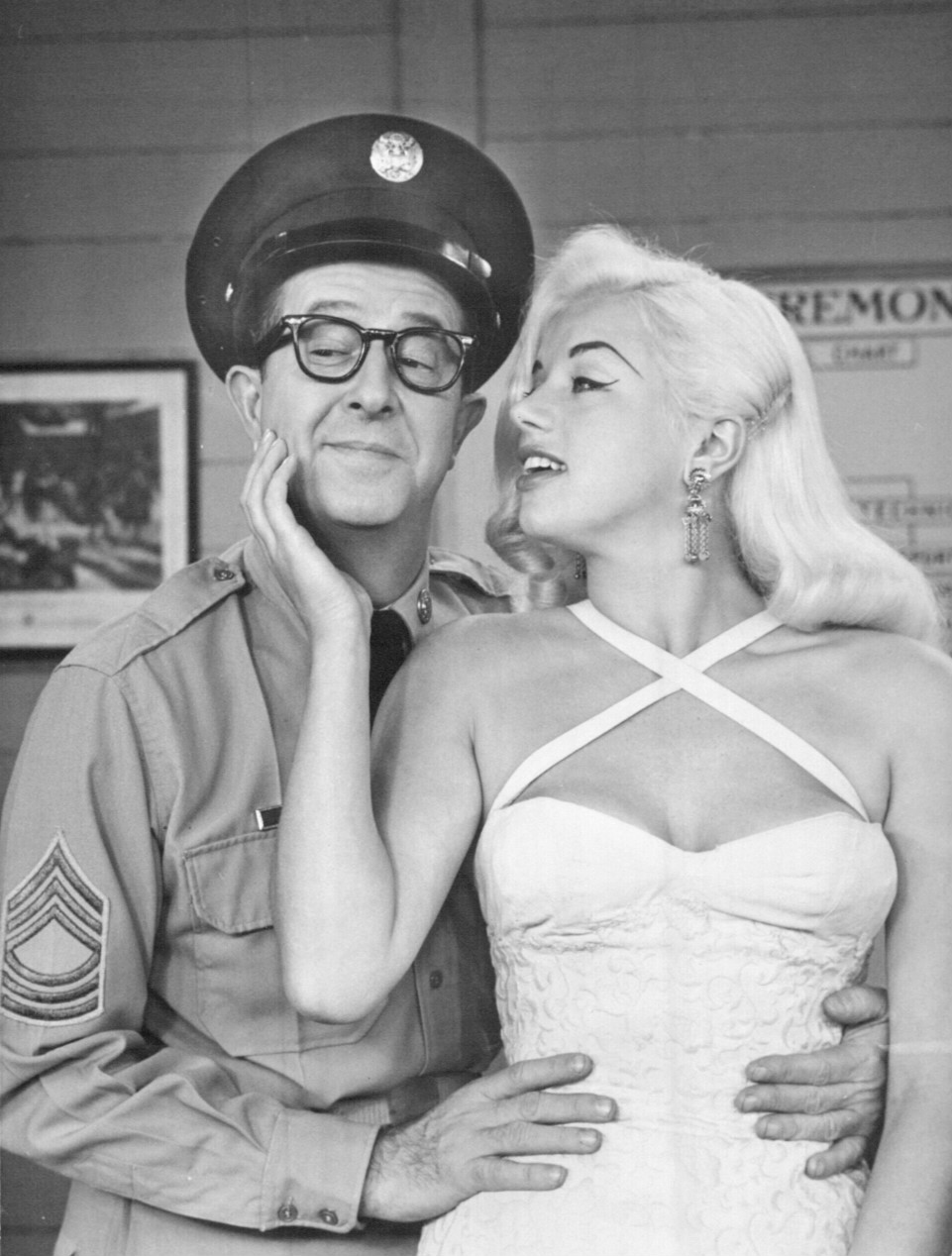
Dors with Phil Silvers, 1958

In England she made The Long Haul (1957) for Columbia with Victor Mature, which started filming in February 1957. While making The Long Haul, Dors started a relationship with co-star Mature's stuntman, Tommy Yeardye. Details about the affair were reportedly leaked to the press by Yeardye.

Gerd Oswald wanted her for The Blonde. In October 1957, Hedda Hopper reported that Dors intended to make the last two films under her RKO contract, but Hopper thought "she was just whistling Dixie."

Dors went to Italy to play an American in the French-Italian The Love Specialist (1957) with Vittorio Gassman. She stayed in crime for Tread Softly Stranger (1958), made for Gordon Parry with George Baker co-starring. She later said her three 1957 films made her £27,000. In November 1957 she was released from her contract with Rank. Director Lewis Gilbert later said Dors would have been a better choice than Virginia McKenna to play Violette Szabo in the 1958 film Carve Her Name with Pride, saying "it should have been someone like Diana Dors, who was much rougher, because Violet was a Cockney who had lived in Brixton, a very poor area of London." However, Rank insisted McKenna play the part. Filmink wrote that if Dors had been cast in Carve Her Name with Pride it "would have launched Dors to the top rank and she might have become the genuine star that she should have been."

Gassman and Dors were to reunite in Strange Holiday, but it was not made. She was a prostitute in Passport to Shame (1958). In August 1958, she reported she had been robbed of £11,000. In the same year, she reportedly was paid £20,000 for three day's work on television commercials for a brand of British sparkling white wine.

Dors's RKO films flopped, so RKO elected not to make the other two films. In December 1958, RKO terminated its contract with Dors, alleging she "has become an object of disgrace, obloquy, ill will, and ridicule." Dors sued the studio for $1,250,000 in damages; in July 1960, she settled for $200,000.

Joseph Kaufman announced he wanted to make a film starring her called Stopover, but it was never made. In May 1959, she said she wanted to retire from acting and focus on her other interests, including a shampoo factory. She had a cameo on Scent of Mystery, shot in Spain.

=== Cabaret ===
Following her final separation from Hamilton in 1958, Dors discovered that her company, Diana Dors Ltd, was in serious debt. Hamilton had steered the company toward the dual purpose of publicising his wife and helping himself, over paying tax bills and establishing financial stability. Having been forced by Hamilton "at gunpoint" to sign over all of her assets prior to the end of their marriage, and in need of money to pay her divorce lawyers and their accountants, she agreed to the suggestion of agent Joseph Collins to undertake a theatre-based cabaret tour titled "The Diana Dors Show". In July 1958, Dors was the top of the bill act at a cabaret in Coventry, being paid £2,500 a week.

Yeardye suggested that they hire comedian Dickie Dawson, later known as Richard Dawson; Dawson subsequently scripted the show and wrote most of the material. Dors started a relationship with Dawson and ended the relationship with Yeardye, who subsequently emptied her cash box at Harrods of £18,000 and sold his story to the media. This brought negative publicity to the show, but audience numbers remained high, which allowed Dors extra time to explain her affairs to a subsequent Inland Revenue investigation of her cash holdings. In 1959, Hamilton died, and Dors married Dawson in New York while making an appearance on The Steve Allen Show. "The Diana Dors Show" was commissioned for two studio-based series on television at ITV.

In 1960, it was announced Dors and Dawson would make a film of the stage show Grab Me a Gondola, but it never happened.

Filmink magazine said, "no decent British film roles seemed forthcoming" around this time. "The Rank Organisation, who could have used Dors around this time, did not seem interested. Neither did Hammer Films, who were experiencing global success with their horror movies. Perhaps most frustratingly for Dors, J. Lee Thompson, who had given her the two best opportunities, made a series of films featuring parts that Dors could have played, but which, for whatever reason, were taken by other actors."

=== Back in Hollywood ===
After the birth of her first child in February 1960, and wishing to stay in the United States with Dawson, Dors undertook a cabaret contract to headline at the Dunes hotel and casino in Las Vegas. In September 1960, she did a cabaret act at Ciro's, which Variety said was "pleasant enough".

She appeared in some American films: On the Double (1961), a Danny Kaye comedy, and The Big Bankroll (1962), a crime film also known as King of the Roaring 20's: The Story of Arnold Rothstein. She also sold her memoirs to the News of the World for $140,000. She later said she turned down a role in Saturday Night and Sunday Morning.

During the summer of 1961, Dors shot "The Sorcerer's Apprentice", based on Robert Bloch's story, for Alfred Hitchcock Presents. The episode was so gruesome that it was suppressed for decades.

Dors returned to Britain. In 1961, she narrowly escaped death at a Guy Fawkes Night party in Wraysbury, where fireworks were accidentally ignited indoors. The house was destroyed, three people died in the fire and another one had a fatal heart attack, and Dors was slightly injured while escaping through a window.

She appeared in Mrs. Gibbons' Boys (1962), West 11 (1963), The Counterfeit Constable (1964), and The Sandwich Man (1966).

In the early 1960s, she was living in Los Angeles. While there she guest starred on episodes of Burke's Law and The Eleventh Hour, and starred in a 1963 episode of The Alfred Hitchcock Hour titled "Run for Doom", co-starring John Gavin, and episodes of Straightaway and Armchair Theatre in Britain.

She toured Australia in 1963. While there, she said 1956 was "my biggest year, and you never can tell whether you will do it again. That is what makes show business so fascinating —you never can tell."

=== Film production ===
By 1957, Dors owned or part-owned a company called Diador Film Productions. Its only recorded output is the comedy Alive and Kicking, released in the UK in 1959 and in the US in 1964.

== Later career ==
=== Bankruptcy ===
Dors divorced Dawson in 1966 and returned to the UK to find work, leaving behind her two sons. She resumed cabaret work with her pianist and musical director Denny Termer, and subsequently was served with a writ of bankruptcy. As her popularity had fallen, this time she was touring working men's clubs, and smaller venues.

In June 1968, she reported that she owed £53,000, of which £48,000 was to the Inland Revenue, and had assets of a little over £200. She declared bankruptcy in October 1968.

Dors's film career was now strictly supporting roles: Danger Route (1967); Berserk! (1967), with Joan Crawford; Hammerhead (1968); Baby Love (1968); Deep End (1970); and There's a Girl in My Soup (1970). She returned to the West End in 1970 for the first time in 17 years in a play called Three Months Gone.

=== Television stardom and supporting film roles ===
Dors played the title role in the sitcom, Queenie's Castle (1970–72), which ran for three series. Less popular was the follow-up, All Our Saturdays (1973). During this period, she appeared in a TV adaptation of A Taste of Honey (1971) and episodes of Z Cars, Dixon of Dock Green, Just William, The Sweeney, Hammer House of Horror, and Shoestring.

Dors's film work included Hannie Caulder (1971); The Pied Piper (1972); The Amazing Mr. Blunden (1972); Swedish Wildcats (1972); Nothing but the Night (1972); Theatre of Blood (1973); Steptoe and Son Ride Again (1973); From Beyond the Grave (1973); and Craze (1974).

In the mid-1970s, she became in high demand for sex comedies: The Amorous Milkman (1975), Bedtime with Rosie (1975), What the Swedish Butler Saw (1975), Three for All (1976), Adventures of a Taxi Driver (1976), Keep It Up Downstairs (1976), Adventures of a Private Eye (1977), and Confessions from the David Galaxy Affair (1979).

In 1974, she appeared on stage in a production of Oedipus Rex.

In 1977, she won a court battle to prevent Wolf Rilla from writing a biography based on interviews she had done with Rilla.

=== Final years ===
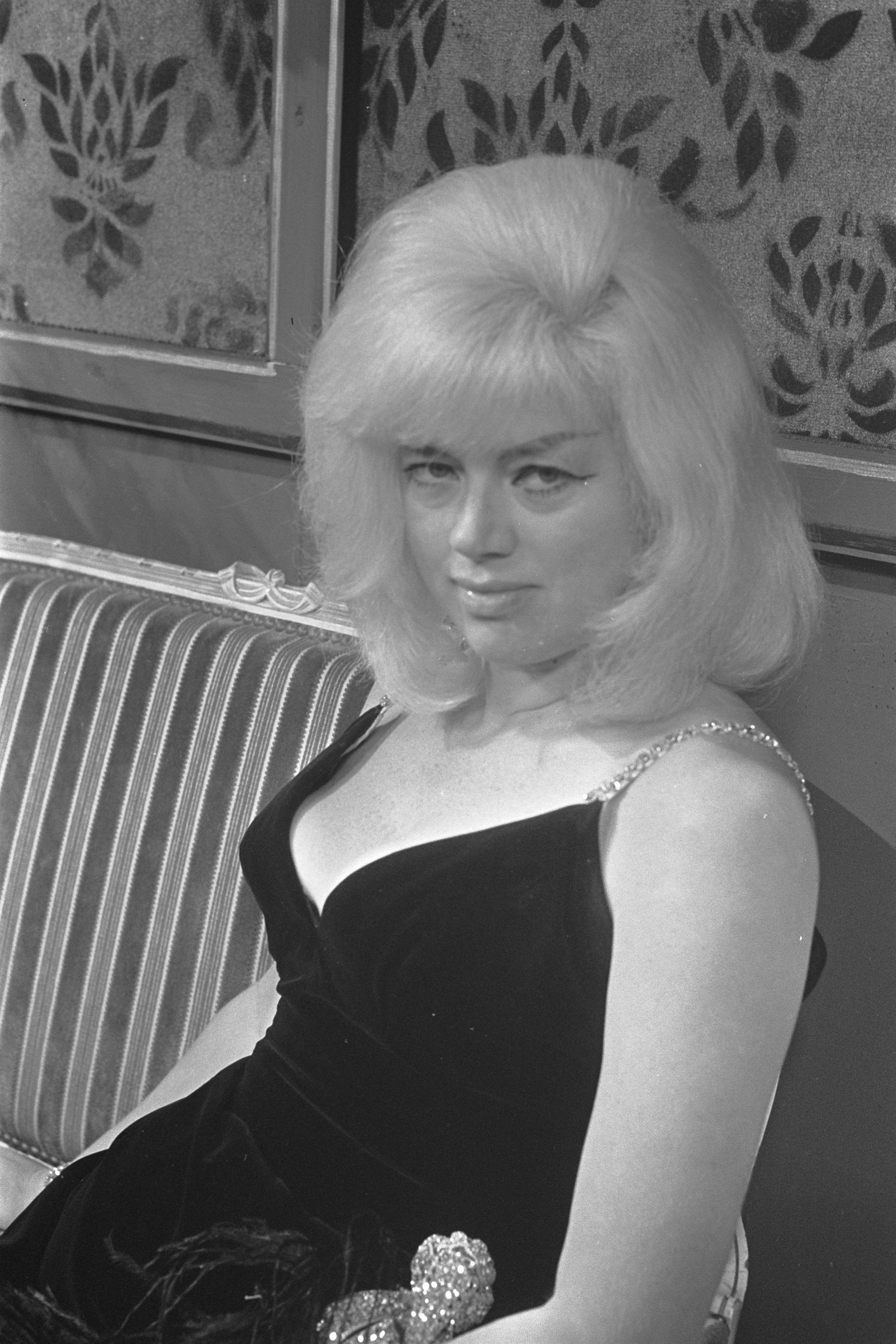
Dors in 1968

Still making headlines in the News of the World and other print media in the late 1970s thanks to her adult parties, in her later years, Dors's status began to revive.

In 1979 while touring Australia, she said, "I used to think it was a lot of hooey that life begins at 40. But I know what I can put up with; I've mellowed. I'm a homey person, although I don't expect people to believe it."

Although her film work consisted mainly of sex comedies, her popularity climbed due to her television work, where her wit, intelligence, and catchy one-liners developed as a cabaret performer won over viewers. She became a regular on Jokers Wild, Blankety Blank and Celebrity Squares, and was a regular guest on BBC Radio 2's The Law Game. She also had an ongoing role in a serial segment "The Worm That Turned" in The Two Ronnies in 1980, in which she played the leader of a feminist dictatorship. A popular chat-show guest, an entire show – Russell Harty: At Home with Dors – came from the pool room of her home, Orchard Manor. Younger musical artists engaged her persona, brought about after the 1981 Adam and the Ants music video "Prince Charming", where she played the fairy godmother opposite Adam Ant, who played a male Cinderella figure. Dors was also namechecked on the track "Scorpios" on the Ants' Prince Charming parent album.

Dors's other final appearances were in a BBC television adaptation of Dr. Jekyll and Mr. Hyde (1980), Timon of Athens (1981), Dick Turpin (1981), and Cannon and Ball (1981).

Having turned her life story into a cash flow through interviews and leaked tabloid stories, she turned to an autobiography to generate retirement cash. In 1960, she wrote and published Swingin' Dors, and between 1978 and 1984, she published four autobiographical books under her own name: For Adults Only, Behind Closed Dors, Dors by Diana, and A. to Z. of Men.

Diana Dors was the subject of This Is Your Life on two occasions, in April 1957, when she was surprised by Eamonn Andrews at the BBC Television Theatre, and in October 1982, when Andrews surprised her at London's Royalty Theatre.

By the early 1980s, when she went through her first round of cancer treatment, her weight had significantly increased; she addressed the issue through co-writing a diet book, and creating a diet and exercise videocassette. This resulted in her working for TV-am, ITV's breakfast station, in the summer of 1983, in a regular slot "Diana Dors Diet" focusing on diet and nutrition, tracking her progress in shedding weight, along with that of twelve fellow dieters, the "Dors Dozen". This later developed into an agony aunt segment once Dors had reached her target weight. As the cancer treatment took its toll again, however, her appearances became less frequent. She sued the show for withholding her fan mail.

Her last public appearance was in cabaret at Harpoon Louie's, Earl's Court, West London, on 15 April 1984, where she looked considerably frail, but stood throughout her whole set. Her final (posthumous) film appearance was in Steaming (1985).

== Discography ==
The earliest recordings of Dors were two sides of a 78-rpm single released on His Master's Voice in 1953. The tracks were "I Feel So Mmmm" and "A Kiss and a Cuddle (and a Few Kind Words from You)". His Master's Voice also released sheet music featuring sultry photos of Dors on the cover. She also sang "The Hokey Pokey Polka" on the 1954 soundtrack for the film As Long as They're Happy. Dors recorded only one complete album, the swing-themed Swingin' Dors, in 1960. The LP was originally released on red vinyl and with a gatefold sleeve. The accompanying orchestra was conducted by Wally Stott.

Dors also sang as a special guest for the Italian TV show Un, due, tre (One, two, three, starring Ugo Tognazzi and Raimondo Vianello) on 31 May 1959, at the Teatro della Fiera in Milan, with the orchestra conducted by Mario Bertolazzi, and recorded singles on various record labels from the 1960s through the early 1980s, including a single for the Nomis label, "Where Did They Go?" / "It's You Again" (the latter being a duet with her son, Gary Dawson), while she was being treated for cancer. The track had been recorded originally by Peggy Lee in 1971 and by Sandie Shaw in 1972.

=== Studio albums ===
Recorded	Album title	Label	Catalogue No.	Format	Notes
1955	As Long as They're Happy	His Master's Voice	DLPC 1	10" LP	Soundtrack (Performing "The Hokey Pokey Polka")
1960	Swingin' Dors	Pye Records	NPL 18044	LP	Solo LP
1968	Thoroughly Modern Millie	World Record Club	T-849	LP	Soundtrack (Performing "Do It Again" and "Jazz Baby")
1968	Doctor Doolittle	World Record Club	T-850	LP	Soundtrack (Performing "At the Crossroads", "Beautiful Things", "Fabulous Places" and "I Think I Like You")

=== Singles ===
Recorded	Album title	Label	Catalogue No.	Release
1953	"I Feel So Mmm......" / "A Kiss and a Cuddle (And a Few Kind Words from You)"	His Master's Voice	B-10613	78 rpm
1960	"April Heart" / "Point of No Return"	Pye Records	7N.15242	45 rpm from the album Swinging Dors
1964	"So Little Time" / "It's Too Late"	Fontana Records	TF 506	
1966	"Security" / "Garry"	Polydor Records	56111	
1977	"Passing By" / "It's a Small World"	EMI Records	EMI 2705	
1981	"Where Did They Go" / "It's You Again" (with Gary Dors)	Nomis Records	NOM 1	

=== Other recordings ===
Recorded	Song title	Notes
1963	"Just One of Those Things" / "How Long Has This Been Going On"	Performed on The Alfred Hitchcock Hour as character Nickie Carole

== Personal life ==
Dors was married three times:

- Dennis Hamilton Gittins (3 July 1951 – 3 January 1959, his death): married five weeks after meeting, at Caxton Hall; no children; lived in London, Berkshire, and Hollywood
- Richard Dawson (12 April 1959 – 1966, divorced): married in New York; two sons, Mark Dawson and Gary Dawson; lived in London, New York, and Hollywood
- Alan Lake (23 November 1968 – 4 May 1984, her death): married at Caxton Hall; one son, Jason Lake; lived at Orchard Manor, Sunningdale, Berkshire

In 1949, while filming Diamond City, she had a relationship with businessman Michael Caborn-Waterfield, who later founded the Ann Summers chain, which he named after a former girlfriend. During the short relationship, Dors became pregnant, but Caborn-Waterfield paid for a back-street abortion, which took place on a kitchen table in Battersea. The relationship continued for a time, before Dors met Dennis Hamilton Gittins on the set of Lady Godiva Rides Again, and while with him she had a second abortion in 1951.

Dors is said to have become a close friend of Ruth Ellis, the last woman to be hanged in Britain, after Ellis had a bit part in Lady Godiva Rides Again. However, Dors never mentioned having known Ellis, either in interviews or in her memoirs. Through her husband Hamilton, Dors was close friends with the notorious Kray twins and their mother, Violet.

=== Parties ===
During her relationship with Hamilton and until a few months before her death, Dors regularly held adult parties at her home. There, a number of celebrities, amply supplied with alcohol and drugs, mixed with young starlets against a background of both softcore and hardcore porn films. Dors gave all her guests full access to the entire house; her son Jason Lake later alleged in various media interviews and publications that she had equipped it with 8 mm movie cameras. The young starlets were made aware of the arrangements and were allowed to attend for free in return for making sure that their celebrity partners performed in bed at the right camera angles. Dors later enjoyed watching the films, keeping an archive of the best performances.

Dors became an early subject of the "celebrity exposé" tabloids, appearing regularly in the News of the World. In large part, she brought this notoriety upon herself. In desperate need of cash after her separation from Hamilton in 1958, she gave an interview in which she described their lives and the adult group parties in full, frank detail. The interview was serialised in the tabloid for 12 weeks, followed by an extended six-week series of sensational stories, creating negative publicity. Subsequently, the Archbishop of Canterbury Geoffrey Fisher denounced Dors as a "wayward hussy".

However, other mainstream news media, on television and film, were unwilling to repeat the stories until well after Dors's death. This was in part because of her popularity, and also partly because of who was attending the parties. Her former lover and party guest Bob Monkhouse later commented in an interview after Dors's death, "The awkward part about an orgy, is that afterwards you're not too sure who to thank."

== Death ==
Towards the end of her life, Dors had meningitis and twice underwent surgery to remove cancerous tumours. She collapsed at her home in Sunningdale with acute stomach pains and returned to the BMI Princess Margaret Hospital in Windsor, where she died a few days later on 4 May 1984, aged 52, from a recurrence of ovarian cancer, first diagnosed two years before.

She had converted to Catholicism in early 1973; hence her funeral service on 11 May was held at the Sacred Heart Church in Sunningdale, conducted by Father Theodore Fontanari. She was buried in Sunningdale Catholic Cemetery, Kiln Lane, Sunningdale. Alan Lake, her last husband, is buried by her side.

== Alan Lake's suicide ==
After her death Alan Lake burned all Dors's remaining clothes and fell into a depression. On 10 October 1984 Lake did a telephone interview with Daily Express journalist Jean Rook and then walked into their son's bedroom and took his own life by firing a shotgun into his mouth. He was 43. This was five months after her death from cancer and 16 years to the day since they had first met. Lake had no alcohol or illegal drugs in his system at the time of his death.

Her home for the previous 20 years, Orchard Manor, was sold by the solicitors. The house's contents were bulk-sold by Sotheby's, which sold her jewellery collection in an auction. After solicitors' bills, outstanding tax payments, death duties and other distributions, the combined estates of Dors and Lake left little for the upkeep of their son Jason (aged 14), who was subsequently made a ward of court to his half-brother Gary Dawson in Los Angeles.

== Jason Dors-Lake's death ==
On 14 September 2019 Jason Dors-Lake, the son of Diana Dors and Alan Lake, was reported to have died three days after his 50th birthday at his flat in Notting Hill Gate, London, from the combined effects of alcohol and tramadol intoxication.

== Commemoration in Swindon ==
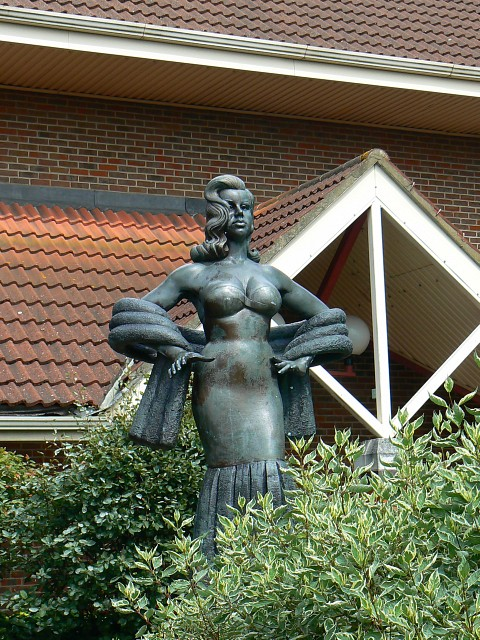
Statue of Dors in West Swindon

Dors is commemorated in her home town of Swindon.

=== Statue ===
A larger-than-life bronze statue of Dors by John Clinch was erected outside the cinema at Shaw Ridge in West Swindon in 1991. It depicts an exaggerated version of her wearing an evening gown.

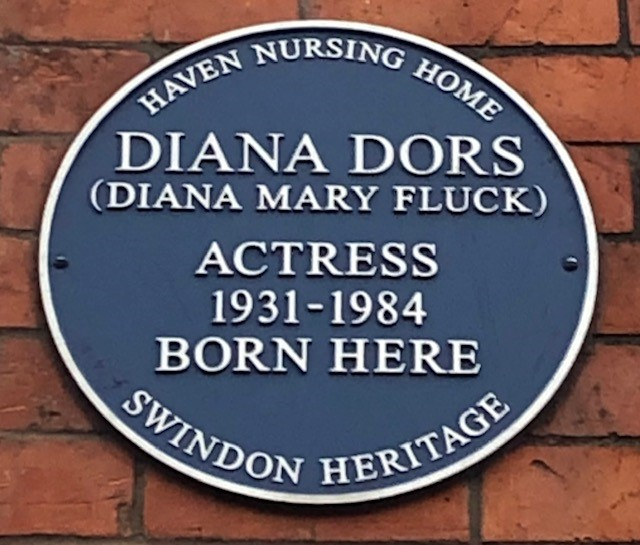
Blue plaque in Kent Road, Swindon

=== Blue plaque ===
Swindon Heritage unveiled a blue plaque to Dors in 2017 on the boundary of numbers 61 and 62 Kent Road in the Old Town area of Swindon. At the time, the two properties were the Haven Nursing Home where she was born. The plaque was unveiled by her son Jason Dors-Lake and her granddaughter Ruby Lake. Dors's 1959 pink Cadillac, which was a gift to her from Shepperton Studios, was parked outside during the unveiling.

=== Bust ===
The collection of Swindon Museum and Art Gallery includes a bronze bust of Dors by Enid Mitchell. It was originally unveiled at the Wyvern Theatre in the town in 1988, where it was displayed in the foyer until 2013, when it was moved to Swindon Central Library. It remained on display there until it was rehoused in the Museum and Art Gallery in 2015.

== In popular culture ==
Dors was portrayed by Keeley Hawes (younger) and Amanda Redman (older) in the TV biographical film The Blonde Bombshell (1999).

On the cover of the 1967 album Sgt. Pepper's Lonely Hearts Club Band by the Beatles, Dors's wax figure appears in the collage of celebrities, on the right below the tree.

The Kinks paid homage to her when they included the Ray Davies-penned tribute tune "Good Day" on their album Word of Mouth.

Dors is namechecked in the track "It's Too Late" on the New York Dolls' second album Too Much Too Soon.

After appearing as lead singer Adam Ant's fairy godmother in Adam and the Ants' music video for their hit single "Prince Charming", Dors was also namechecked in their song "Scorpios" (on the band's Prince Charming album) with lyrics "Black's the colour watch the claws, With nails as sharp as Diana Dors".

Dors was the cover star of the Smiths' album Singles.

== Alleged fortune ==
Dors claimed to have hidden away more than £2 million in banks across Europe. In 1982, she gave her son Mark Dawson a sheet of paper on which, she told him, was a code that would reveal the whereabouts of the money. His stepfather Alan Lake supposedly knew the key that would crack the code, but he died by suicide soon after her death and Dawson was left with an apparently unsolvable puzzle.

He sought out computer forensic specialists Inforenz, who recognised the encryption as the one attributed to Blaise de Vigenère (Vigenère cipher), but actually invented by Giovan Battista Bellaso. Inforenz then used their own cryptanalysis software to suggest a 10-letter decryption key, DMARYFLUCK (short for Diana Mary Fluck, Dors's real name). With the aid of a bank statement found among Alan Lake's papers, Inforenz was then able to decode the existing material to reveal a list of surnames and towns only – suggesting that there must be a second page that would reveal first names and bank details, to complete the message. As this has never come to light, no money has ever been traced. In 2003, Channel 4 made a television programme about the mystery.

== Filmography ==
Year	Title	Role	Notes
1947	Code of Scotland Yard	Mildred	Uncredited
1947	Dancing with Crime	Annette	Uncredited. a.k.a. Code of Scotland Yard.
1947	Holiday Camp	Dancer	Uncredited
1948	The Calendar	Hawkins	
1948	Good-Time Girl	Lyla Lawrence	
1948	Penny and the Pownall Case	Molly James	
1948	Oliver Twist	Charlotte	
1948	My Sister and I	Dreary Girl	
1948	Here Come the Huggetts	Diana Hopkins	
1949	Vote for Huggett	Diana Gowan	
1949	It's Not Cricket	Blonde	
1949	A Boy, a Girl and a Bike	Ada Foster	
1949	Diamond City	Dora Bracken	
1950	Dance Hall	Carole	
1951	Worm's Eye View	Thelma	
1951	Lady Godiva Rides Again	Dolores August	
1952	The Last Page	Ruby Bruce	
1952	My Wife's Lodger	Eunice Higginbotham	
1953	The Great Game	Lulu Smith	
1953	Is Your Honeymoon Really Necessary?	Candy Markham	
1953	The Saint's Return	The Blonde in Lennar's Apartment	
1953	It's a Grand Life	Corporal Paula Clements	
1954	The Weak and the Wicked	Betty Brown	a.k.a. Young and Willing (U.S.)
1955	As Long as They're Happy	Pearl Delaney	
1955	A Kid for Two Farthings	Sonia	
1955	Miss Tulip Stays the Night	Kate Dax	
1955	Value for Money	Ruthine West	
1955	An Alligator Named Daisy	Vanessa Colebrook	
1956	Yield to the Night	Mary Hilton	
1957	The Long Haul	Lynn	Spanish title: El Precio de un Hombre (The Price of a Man)
1957	The Unholy Wife	Phyllis Hochen	
1958	The Love Specialist	Diana Dixon	
1958	I Married a Woman	Janice Blake Briggs	Original title: So There You Are
1958	Tread Softly Stranger	Calico	
1958	Passport to Shame	Vicki	
1960	Scent of Mystery	Winifred Jordan	First film in Smell-o-Vision. Re-released in Cinerama as Holiday in Spain.
1961	On the Double	Sergeant Bridget Stanhope	
1961	King of the Roaring '20s: The Story of Arnold Rothstein	Madge	a.k.a. The Big Bankroll
1962	Mrs. Gibbons' Boys	Myra	
1963	West 11	Georgia	
1964	The Counterfeit Constable	Diana Dors	
1966	The Sandwich Man	First Billingsgate Lady	
1967	Danger Route	Rhoda Gooderich	
1967	Berserk!	Matilda	
1968	Hammerhead	Kit	
1969	Baby Love	Liz	
1970	Deep End	Mike's First Lady Client	
1970	There's a Girl in My Soup	His Wife	
1971	Hannie Caulder	Madame	
1972	The Pied Piper	Frau Poppendick	
1972	The Amazing Mr. Blunden	Mrs. Wickens	
1972	Swedish Wildcats	Margareta	a.k.a. Every Afternoon
1973	Nothing but the Night	Anna Harb	
1973	Theatre of Blood	Maisie Psaltery	
1973	Steptoe and Son Ride Again	Woman In Flat	
1974	From Beyond the Grave	Mabel Lowe	
1974	Craze	Dolly Newman	
1975	The Amorous Milkman	Rita	
1975	What the Swedish Butler Saw	Madame Helena	
1975	Bedtime with Rosie	Aunt Annie	
1975	Three for All	Mrs. Ball	
1976	Adventures of a Taxi Driver	Mrs. North	
1976	Keep It Up Downstairs	Daisy Dureneck	a.k.a. Can You Keep it Up Downstairs?, My Favorite Butler
1977	Adventures of a Private Eye	Mrs. Horne	
1979	Confessions from the David Galaxy Affair	Jenny Stride	
1985	Steaming	Violet	Released posthumously

== Television roles ==
Year	Title	Role	Notes
1951	Face to Face	Angel	TV film
1951	How Do You View?	Cuddles	6 episodes
1954	Rheingold Theatre	Angie	Episode: "The Lovely Place"
1957–1982	This is Your Life	Self	5 episodes
1959	The Phil Silvers Show	Self	Episode: "Keep in Step"
1959–1961	The Diana Dors Show	Self	
1960	Armchair Theatre	Jane Francis	Episode: "The Innocent"
1960	The Red Skelton Hour	Joan Williams	Episode: "George Appleby's Neighbor"
1961	The Jack Benny Program	Lady Milbeck	Episode: "English Sketch"
1961	Straightaway	Photographer	Episode: "The Sportscar Breed"
1962	Alfred Hitchcock Presents	Irene Sadini	Episode: "The Sorcerer's Apprentice"
1963	The Alfred Hitchcock Hour	Nickie Carole	Episode: "Run for Doom"
1963	Burke's Law	Maxine Borman	Episode: "Who Killed Alex Debbs?"
1964	The Eleventh Hour	Carol Devon	Episode: "87 Different Kinds of Love"
1964	Armchair Theatre	Grace Maxwell	Episode: "A Nice Little Business"
1968	The Inquisitors	Sweet P. Lawrence	Episode: "The Peeling of Sweet P. Lawrence"
1968	Boy Meets Girl	Megan Norton-Grey	Episode: "Where Have All the Ghosts Gone?"
1970–1972	Queenie's Castle	Queenie Shepherd	All 18 episodes
1971	The Misfit	Maggie	Episode: "On Superior Persons"
1971	A Taste of Honey	Helen	All 3 episodes
1971	Z Cars	Madge Owen	2 episodes
1972	Dixon of Dock Green	Maisie Dewar	Episode: "The Informant"
1973	All Our Saturdays	Di Dorkins	All 6 episodes
1975	Whodunnit?	Self-Panelist	Episode: "Death at the Top"
1975	Thriller	Bessy Morne	Episode: "Nurse Will Make It Better"
1977–1978	Just William	Mrs. Bott	7 episodes
1978	The Sweeney	Mrs. Rix	Episode: "Messenger of the Gods"
1979	Of Mycenae and Men	Helen of Troy	TV film
1979	The Plank	Woman with Rose	TV film
1980	Hammer House of Horror	Mrs. Ardoy	Episode: "Children of the Full Moon"
1980	Shoestring	Maggie	Episode: "Looking for Mr Wright"
1980	Dr. Jekyll and Mr. Hyde	Kate Winterton	TV film
1980	The Two Ronnies	The Commander	4 episodes
1981	BBC Television Shakespeare	Timandra	Episode: "Timon of Athens"
1981	Dick Turpin	Mrs. Buskin	Episode: "Dick Turpin's Greatest Adventure: Part 4"
1981	Top of the Pops	Fairy Godmother	3 episodes
1982–1983	Punchlines	Self-Panelist	2 Christmas Specials
1982	The Morecambe & Wise Show	Self	Christmas Special
1984	Cannon and Ball	Miss Scarlett	Episode: #5.5

== Select stage appearances ==
- The Cat and the Canary (1949) at the Connaught Theatre, Worthing
- The Good Young Man (1949)
- Lisette by Douglas Sergeant (Sept 1949) - Brighton
- Man of the World (1950)
- Rendezvous
- Life with the Lyons (1952) - stage version of radio sohow
- Remains to be Seen by Russel Crouse and Howard Lindsay (Dec 1952) - Her Majesty’s Theatre, Haymarket, London
- Three Months Gone by Donald Howarth (1970) - Royal Court Theatre
- Oedipus Tyrannus (1974) - Chinchester Festival
- Murder Mistaken (1975)
