= Innocent Ntsume =

South African soccer player

Personal information
- Date of birth: 7 July 1980 (age 45)
- Place of birth: Cape Town, South Africa
- Height: 1.74 m (5 ft 9 in)
- Position: Midfielder

Senior career*
Years	Team	Apps	(Gls)
1999–2008	Jomo Cosmos		
2008–2009	FC AK		
- * Club domestic league appearances and goals

Innocent Ntsume (born 7 July 1980) is a South African former professional soccer player who played as a midfielder.

== Career ==
Ntsume began his professional career in 1999 with Jomo Cosmos, before moving to FC AK in August 2008. He was released from his two-year contract with FC AK in January 2009, due to financial reasons.
