= Innocent Muchaneka =

Zimbabwean footballer (born 1991)

Personal information
- Date of birth: 3 August 1991 (age 35)
- Place of birth: Zimbabwe
- Position: Midfielder

Team information
- Current team: CAPS United

Senior career*
Years	Team	Apps	(Gls)
2015–2016	Hwange Colliery		
2016–2019	Chicken Inn		
2020–	CAPS United		

International career^{‡}
2017–	Zimbabwe	3	(0)
- * Club domestic league appearances and goals as of 22 March 2019 ‡ National team caps and goals as of 22 March 2019

Innocent Muchaneka (born 3 August 1991) is a Zimbabwean footballer who plays as a midfielder for CAPS United and the Zimbabwe national football team.
