= Innocent Chikunya =

Zimbabwean cricketer (born 1985)

Personal information
- Born: 16 July 1985 (age 41); Mutare, Zimbabwe
- Source: ESPNcricinfo, 23 February 2017

Innocent Chikunya (born 16 July 1985) is a Zimbabwean cricketer. He made his first-class debut for Midlands cricket team in the 2004–05 Logan Cup on 26 October 2004.
