= Innocent Gentillet =

French lawyer and politician

Innocent Gentillet (1535–1588) was a French lawyer and politician.

== Biography ==
A Huguenot moderate lawyer and parliamentarian, he was exiled to Geneva after the massacre of St. Bartholomew, and then returned to France after the Edict of Beaulieu in 1576. His Protestant views are the cause of a new exile to Geneva in 1585, where he died in 1588.

He wrote and published in 1576 the Discours sur les moyens de bien gouverner (Sermon on the means of governing), in which he condemned the ideas of Niccolò Machiavelli, suspected of trying to introduce impiety and immorality in government. He also accused the Italians of the entourage of Catherine de' Medici to make the propagators. The book, translated and published in Latin in 1577, then in English, has considerable diffusion throughout Europe until the mid-seventeenth century. It was known as the Anti-Machiavel and amounted to a critical polemic against Machiavelli. Gentillet argues that the source of wealth of a state is its large population. He believes that the infighting and bad laws are contrary to the development of population and condemned luxury as detrimental to national welfare. Gentillet's Discours would soon be known as the Anti-Machiavelli, a term chosen by Frederick the Great as the title of his Critical Essay on the Prince falsely attributed to Voltaire (1740). He also announced political science as defined by Jean Bodin.
