= Innocent Sousa =

Indian poet and writer (1879–1962)

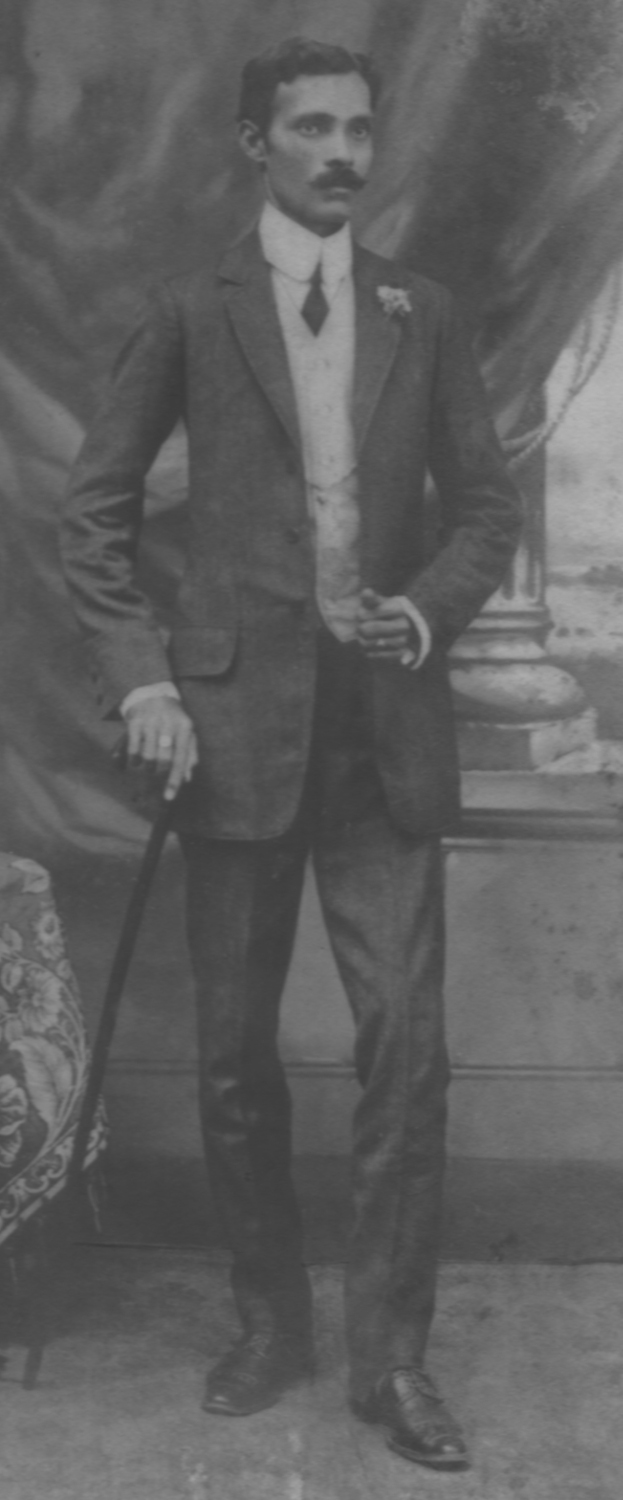
- De Sousa in the 20th century
- Born: Inocencio Antonio Mariano De Sousa; 26 July 1879; Bombay, British India
- Died: 31 July 1962 (aged 83)
- Citizenship: India
- Education: St. Xavier's College, Bombay
- Employer(s): India Post, Bombay, later Poona
- Office: Deputy Postmaster General, Belgaum
- Writing career
- Language: English; Konkani; Portuguese
- Genres: Poetry; creative writing

Inocencio Antonio Mariano De Sousa (26 July 1879 – 31 July 1962) was an Indian poet and writer, who wrote in the English language. He is mentioned in The Golden Treasury of Indo-Anglian Poetry: 1828–1965 and listed, early on among Indian writers in English, in the books-received section of the 1912-founded Poetry journal.

== Current recognition ==
A hundred years later, mention of De Sousa's work can still be found in cyberspace, though the actual texts are not easily accessible. He has also not been adequately understood in his own home-state of Goa.

== Both prose and poetry ==
De Sousa has been listed under both the prose as well as the poetry sections in a study conducted by the University Libraries University of Washington Research Guide on South Asian literature in English for the Pre-Independence period. This was undertaken initially compiled by Irene Joshi.

== Legacy ==
De Sousa is said to have been listed among the top 500 living poets of the world in a book published by Mitre Press, London in 1932, titled Principal Poets of the World Volume I [1] 1930–31.

== Bibliography ==
His other publications include:

- Radha: a romance, and other Indian tales. Bombay: Taraporevala, 1904. 113 p.;
- Radha, a Hindu belle. Bombay: New Book Co., 1939. 151 p.; Rev. ed. of Radha, a romance.
- The Clarks, and other post office tales. Bombay: n.p., 1923.
- Uncle Roland: or looking for a wife. Bombay: Taraporevala, 1906. 156 p.
- Beautiful Bombay and other story poems. Bombay: New Book Co., 1938. 56 p.
- The maid of the hill. London: A.H. Stockwell, 1929.
- The Fascination of the Dance, and Other Tales. Bombay: Taraporewala
- A Guide to Goa, with a brief history of Goa, and the Life of St. Francis Xavier. Bombay: Hosang T. Anklesaria.
- Twixt Night and Morn. London: Drane, London
- Included in anthologies: The Spring Anthology, 1930 (The Mitre Press).

== Work mentioned ==
Five of De Sousa's books are mentioned on amazon.co.uk, but with the mention that the books "are not currently available".
