= Age of Denial =

Studio album by Sennen
- Released: April 5, 2010
- Genres: Alternative rock; shoegaze; post-rock; dream pop
- Length: 54:17
- Label: Hungry Audio

Professional ratings
Review scores
Source	Rating
NME	6/10 stars
Drownedinsound	7/10 stars
Subba-Cultcha	6/10 stars

Age of Denial is the third full-length album released by Sennen on April 5, 2010, under the label, Hungry Audio.

== Track listing ==
1. "Age of Denial" – 4:42
2. "With You" – 5:01
3. "A Little High" – 6:02
4. "Falling Down" – 5:52
5. "S.O.S." – 4:08
6. "Innocence" – 3:38
7. "Red Horizon" – 3:29
8. "Can't See The Light" – 6:23
9. "Sleep Heavy Tonight" – 5:27
10. "Sennen's Day Out" – 1:26
11. "Broken Promise" – 6:15
12. "Out of Our Depth" – 1:54
