= Innocence (Koontz novel) =

2013 novel by Dean Koontz

- Paperback front cover
- Author: Dean Koontz
- Language: English
- Genre: Thriller, mystery, suspense
- Publisher: Bantam Books
- Publication date: December 10, 2013
- Publication place: United States
- Media type: Print (hardback, paperback), e-book, audiobook
- Pages: 480
- ISBN: 9780553593693

Innocence is a horror novel by American author Dean Koontz, first published in 2013. The book is known for its intricate plot, blending elements of mystery, suspense, and the supernatural.

== Plot ==
Innocence tells the story of Addison Goodheart, a boy born with a condition that provokes extreme violence in anyone who sees his face. Due to this, his mother forces him to leave their isolated wilderness home. Alone, Addison navigates life in the woods and then in a city, carefully avoiding human interaction to escape potential violence.

In the city, Addison encounters a man with a similar affliction. This man, understanding Addison's condition, brings him to live in the underground tunnels, teaching him survival skills. Their time together is cut short due to a tragedy, leaving Addison solitary once again.

Addison's routine changes when he secretly enters a library at night and witnesses Gwyneth, a girl of his age, escaping from a man attempting to harm her. Gwyneth, who is dealing with the trauma of her murdered father and her own aversion to touch and social interaction, eventually forms a friendship with Addison. She conscientiously avoids looking at Addison's face, respecting his need for anonymity.

As Addison becomes involved in Gwyneth's life, he finds himself in a series of dangerous situations linked to her past, her father's murder, and the man pursuing her. Together, they confront these immediate dangers, all while facing broader, more complex challenges.

== Publication ==
The book was published on December 10, 2013, by Bantam Books.It includes a bonus short story titled "Wilderness", also by Koontz.

Innocence was noted for its departure from Koontz's typical thriller genre, introducing more elements of fantasy and introspection.

== Reception ==
Innocence received mixed reviews from critics. Some praised the novel for its lyrical prose and philosophical depth, while others criticized it for a perceived departure from the tightly wound suspense that Koontz's readers have come to expect. Notably, the book was commended for its rich character development and the poignant exploration of its central themes: acceptance, love, and the indomitable human spirit. Kirkus Reviews described the book as a blend of "mystery and terror, the paranormal and romance," highlighting its emotional depth and character complexity. Publishers Weekly noted the novel as "the most satisfying Koontz standalone in a while," emphasizing its imaginative storytelling and suspenseful narrative.
