= Saint Innocent =

Saint Innocent may refer to:

- Innocent of Agaunum (died 286), one of the martyrs of the Theban Legion
- Innocent of Tortona, a bishop of Tortona, feast April 17
- Pope Innocent I (died 417), bishop of Rome from 401 to 417
- Innocent of Komel (died 1521), Russian Orthodox monk and wonderworker feast March 19
- Innocent of Irkutsk (c. 1680–1731), first bishop of Irkutsk
- Innocent of Alaska (1797–1879), Russian Orthodox bishop and missionary
