= Inocêncio Francisco da Silva =

Portuguese amanuensis, bibliographer and writer

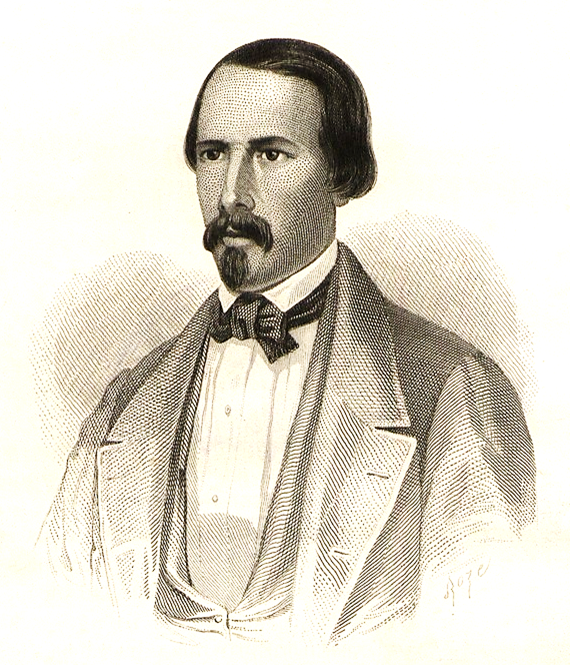
- Born: 28 September 1810; Mercês, Lisbon, Portugal
- Died: 27 June 1876 (aged 65); São Mamede, Lisbon, Portugal
- Other names: Innocencio
- Occupation(s): Amanuensis, bibliographer
- Notable work: Diccionario Bibliographico Portuguez

Inocêncio Francisco da Silva (28 September 1810 – 27 June 1876), often referred simply as Innocencio (the standard spelling of his name at the time) was the most distinguished Portuguese bibliographer, who compiled seven centuries' worth of information about Portuguese-language authors up to the mid-19th century. He authored the monumental Diccionario Bibliographico Portuguez, which was continued by others following his death.

== Biography ==
Inocêncio Francisco da Silva was born in 1810, in the parish of Mercês, in Lisbon, the son of Inocêncio Francisco da Silva and Francisca Henriques. The family was of limited economic resources, and his mother died while he was still young.

From 1825 to 1830, he studied drawing, the humanities, French, and, for two years, he attended the School of Commerce, a professional technical education institution of accounting. By this time, he independently read Rousseau, Volney, and Raynal, though he disliked Voltaire. From 1830 to 1833, he attended a three-year course of Mathematics in the Royal Academy of Navy, in which he was distinguished with prizes of excellence.

That year, on 24 July 1833, in the context of the Liberal Wars, the constitutionalist troops led by the Duke of Terceira landed in the Miguelist-controlled city of Lisbon after several victories in the south of the country, and were welcomed as liberators. Inocêncio Francisco da Silva became at this time a volunteer soldier in Terceira's ranks, until the end of the war the year that followed. Shortly after, he was elected captain of the National Guard.

From 1834 he taught at the Royal Academy of Navy and at the School of Commerce, until 1837, when he was invited to become an amanuensis in the Lisbon Civil Government, first in the treasury division and, starting 1848, in the division for the police, safety, and public health. During his many years in the civil service, he used his spare time to start investigating into the history of Portuguese bibliography, and began assembling a valuable library – he started gathering materials for what would be a successor of what was then the only available Portuguese bibliographic reference work, Diogo Barbosa Machado's century-old Bibliotheca Lusitana (published 1741–1758).

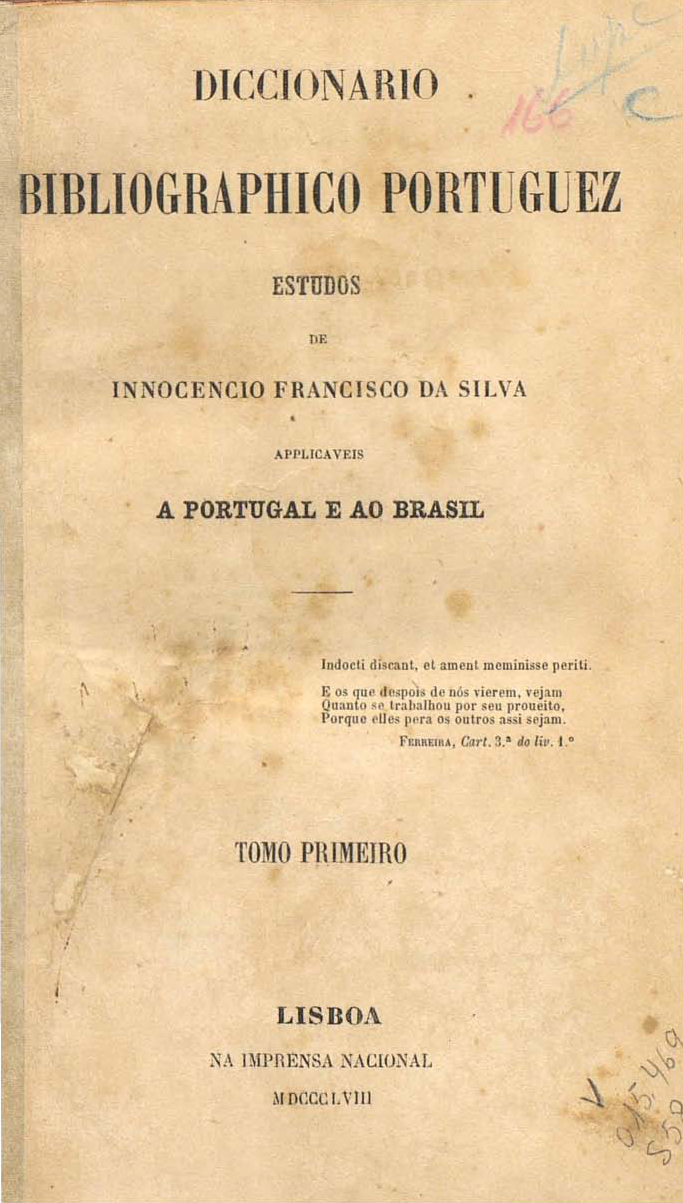
Title page of the first edition of the Diccionario Bibliographico Portuguez, 1858

The first volume of his Diccionario Bibliographico Portuguez (now commonly referred to simply as "Innocencio") was published in October 1858. seven volumes and two supplements of his Diccionario Bibliographico were published during his lifetime, between 1858 and 1862. He became a member of the Lisbon Academy of Sciences and, in 1861, was one of the founding members of the Central Commission of 1 December 1640. He was also a collaborator in journals O Panorama (1837-1868) and Revista Contemporânea de Portugal e Brasil (1859-1865).

Inocêncio Francisco da Silva, choosing Demócrito as his symbolic name, joined the Freemasonry, a member of the masonic lodges "5 de Novembro" and "Pureza", rising to the degrees 7 of the French Rite and 33 of the Ancient and Accepted Scottish Rite.

He died in Lisbon at age 66, unmarried and childless, in his house at number 26 of Rua de São Filipe de Néri, where a commemorative plaque can be found today. His last words were, reportedly, "Adeus, acabou o martírio!" ("Farewell, the martyrdom is no more!"). He was interred at Prazeres Cemetery. His valuable library of rare books was sold after his death, many of his books ending up in the collection of Emperor Peter II of Brazil.
