= History of SSC Napoli =

Italian football club

Società Sportiva Calcio Napoli, commonly referred to as simply Napoli, the most successful football club in Southern Italy and among the major clubs in the Italian Serie A, has a long history, which spans from its foundation in 1905 as Naples Foot-Ball Club to the present day.

Napoli has been refounded a number of times during its history, the most recent of which was in 2004, they have spent the majority of their history in Serie A. The club is perhaps most famous for the period when Diego Maradona was a member, between the 1980s and early 1990s, during which he won several awards, including the scudetto and the Coppa Italia twice; they also had success in Europe, where they captured the UEFA Cup.

== From Naples to Internaples ==
Football was first brought to the city of Naples by English sailors during the early 1900s: the first two clubs were Football Club Partenopeo and Naples Foot-Ball & Cricket Club, both founded in 1905.

The origins of Naples FCC can be traced back to William Poths, an Englishman employed by maritime agency named Cunard Lines, he was an avid amateur footballer in his spare time and decided to found a club while in Italy. A meeting was called at via San Severino 43 in Naples, with the intentions of creating one; Poths, along with fellow Englishman Mr. Bayon and three Neapolitans called Conforti, Catterina and Amedeo Salsi, formed Naples FCC; Salsi was nominated as the first ever president.

Original Naples kit

Their first kit consisted of a sky blue and navy blue striped shirt, with black shorts. Naples played their debut match against British sailors from a ship named Arabik, they competed for a trophy named in honour of Naples first president "Coppa Salsi". Naples were victorious winning the game 3–2, a feat made all the more impressive when considering Arabik had beaten the famed Genoa 3–0 just days earlier. The Naples team that day was;

- Kock – Goalkeeper
- Garozzo – Defender
- Del Pezzo – Defender
- Littie – Defender

- Steinecaer – Defender
- Marin – Midfielder
- Scarfoglio – Midfielder
- McPherson – Midfielder

- Chaudorir – Midfielder
- Poths – Forward
- Ostermann – Forward

One year after its foundation, the "Cricket" part of the name was dropped leaving the club's name as simply Naples Foot-Ball Club. In 1909, Sir Thomas Lipton, of the famous Lipton tea brand, was visiting Sicily while travelling with his ship; he set up a competition called the Lipton Challenge Cup. In this competition, Neapolitan and Sicilian teams faced off against each other annually; the majority of the finals saw Naples playing Palermo Foot-Ball Club. Naples won the competition in the opening season, with a 4–2 result. The trophy was disputed six times in total, with Naples also winning it in 1911 and 1914.

Original Internazionale Napoli kit

In 1912, the foreign part of Naples FBC broke off, and under Bayon and Steinnegger, a second Naples club was formed under the name of US Internazionale Napoli. Meanwhile, Emilio Anatra remained president of Naples FBC which started a footballing rivalry in the city during the following years. They competed against each other in the Campania section of the 1912–13 Italian Championship with Naples coming out on top before losing to Lazio in the next round.

The following season, the situation was reversed, with Internazionale Napoli knocking out Naples before losing to Lazio in the next round. This rivalry continued into its third season in the Campania section of the Championship during 1915, but after the first leg (won by Internazionale 3–0), the competition was called off because of World War I. It resumed after the war as both clubs survived, however clubs such as Puteolana, Bagnolese and Savoia were also now competitive in the region. In 1922, the two rival clubs, under financial pressure, merged as the Foot-Ball Club Internazionale-Naples, abbreviated as FBC Internaples.

== The foundation of Associazione Calcio Napoli ==
On 25 August 1926, the members of Internaples resolved to adopt a new name for their club and Giorgio Ascarelli was appointed as the first president of the Associazione Calcio Napoli. By the time the next season started, the top league system of Italy was split into two groups consisting of ten teams. Napoli finished bottom of their group with a dreadful 1 point earned from 18 games.

This is what got them the nickname I ciucciarelli which means "the little donkeys", previously the football club had carried with them the emblem of the city of Naples, which was a horse. But after the aforementioned season, some in the city derided them as donkeys, the club however adopted O Ciuccio as it was called, making it their mascot and displaying it with pride. The following two seasons they did gradually better, finishing higher with this system each time.

At Napoli, the fans' great pre-war hero was Attila Sallustro, whose family had moved to Naples from Paraguay when he was a child. Sallustro, on account of his well-to-do background, took no salary from the club, though he was rewarded with a luxury motor car. His talent for scoring goals was evident in the 1928–29 season, when he scored 22 goals in 28 games for the club.

=== Serie A: 1930s ===
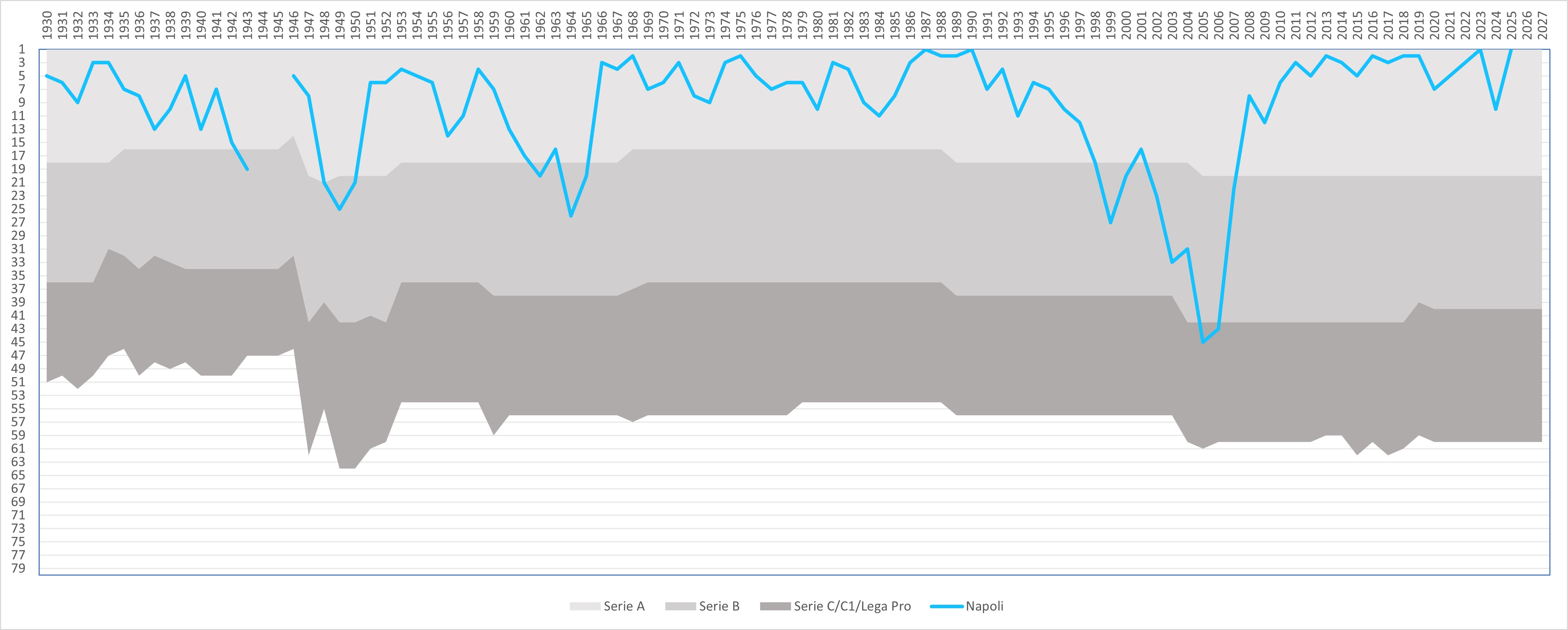
The performance of Napoli in the Italian football league structure since the first season of a unified Serie A (1929/30).

As Italian football moved into the 1930s, the league was formatted into a way in which it remains today. The 1929–30 season showed what Napoli could do on a larger scale, they finished fifth in a season which saw them defeat the likes of Torino, Lazio and Milan. Notably, Sallustro, along with Marcello Mihalic, became the first Napoli players to be called up to the Italy national team around this period.

The next six seasons Napoli consistently finished in the top ten, including two third-place finishes in 1932–33 and 1933–34 under legendary English coach William Garbutt. Another notable club hero from this period was Antonio Vojak; signed from Juventus in 1929, the Italian scored 102 goals in 190 games over a six-year period for Napoli. Top scorer of the 1930 FIFA World Cup, Argentine forward Guillermo Stábile also played at Napoli during the 1935–36 season.

The Neapolitan club was set to go into a decline in the years leading up to World War II, with up and down results in Serie A. They flirted with relegation in 1937 and again in 1940, where they stayed up on a better goal ratio over Liguria. Just one season before this, they had finished in fifth. 1942 saw Napoli finally going down to Serie B, just four points separating them from the next six teams. Down in Serie B, in 1943 Napoli missed out on a promotion straight back up by two points, finishing in third place just behind Brescia. At the end of the season, left their Stadio Giorgio Ascarelli stadium and moved into the Campo Vomero.

=== Post-War Napoli ===
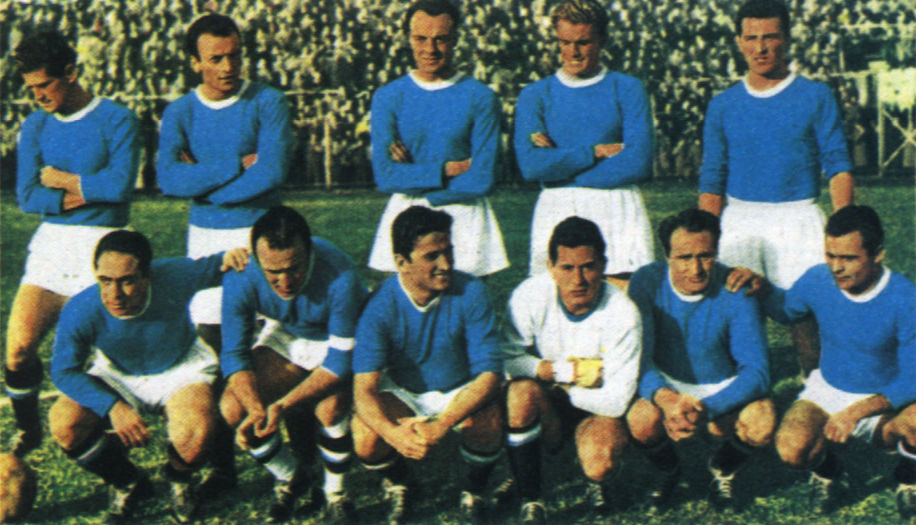
Hasse Jeppson (standing, second from right) and Bruno Pesaola (crouched, first from left) with Napoli teammates in the 1953–54 season

When the championship was contested on a regional basis for the 1946 season, Napoli proved themselves the best team in the Centro-Sud region, losing just three matches en route to a narrow league victory, finishing level on points with Bari, but with a superior goal average. They only finished mid-table in the final group, but it was enough to ensure the Neapolitans a place in Serie A the following year.

Napoli only managed to survive one season in the newly formed Serie A before in 1948 they were relegated again, until becoming champions of Serie B in 1949–50. They managed to step straight back into the groove of Serie A in the following five seasons, finishing in the top six. Along with Fiorentina, Napoli was the subject of the first ever RAI television transmission of a Serie A football match in 1956. During the remainder of the 1950s, their league finishes were up and down: two lower key seasons were followed by a fourth-place finish in 1957–58, above both of the Milanese teams and Roma.

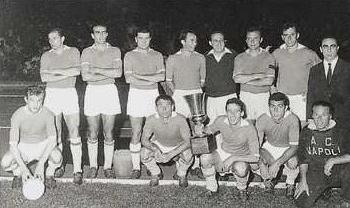
The Coppa Italia winning side of 1962

The 1960s were a mixed time for Napoli. They were relegated in 1961, but finished runners-up in Serie B the following season, regaining promotion. 1962 was also notable for its cup success: Napoli lifted the Coppa Italia by beating SPAL 2–1 in the final with goals from Corelli and Ronzon, the first time a club competing in Serie B had won the competition. Unfortunately for Napoli, they were unable to follow up their cup success with top league stability, as they were relegated once again.

== Società Sportiva Calcio Napoli: on the rise ==
The mid-1960s saw the club rise up again. Their name was changed to Società Sportiva Calcio Napoli on 25 June 1964 and they were promoted as runners-up from Serie B during the 1964–65 season. During their first season back in Serie A, the Neapolitan side managed to finished an impressive third place in the league with Argentine manager Bruno Pesaola at the helm. They also won the Coppa delle Alpi trophy in the same year, defeating Juventus.

Napoli came very close to winning the league in 1967–68, finishing just behind Milan in second place. During this spell for the club, their squad boasted several players who achieved widespread recognition in the game, including future 1982 World Cup winner Dino Zoff, the record breaking striker José Altafini and Naples-born defender Antonio Juliano. The club managed to keep their name amongst the elite of Italian football in the early '70s, with two third-place finishes in 1970–71 and 1973–74.

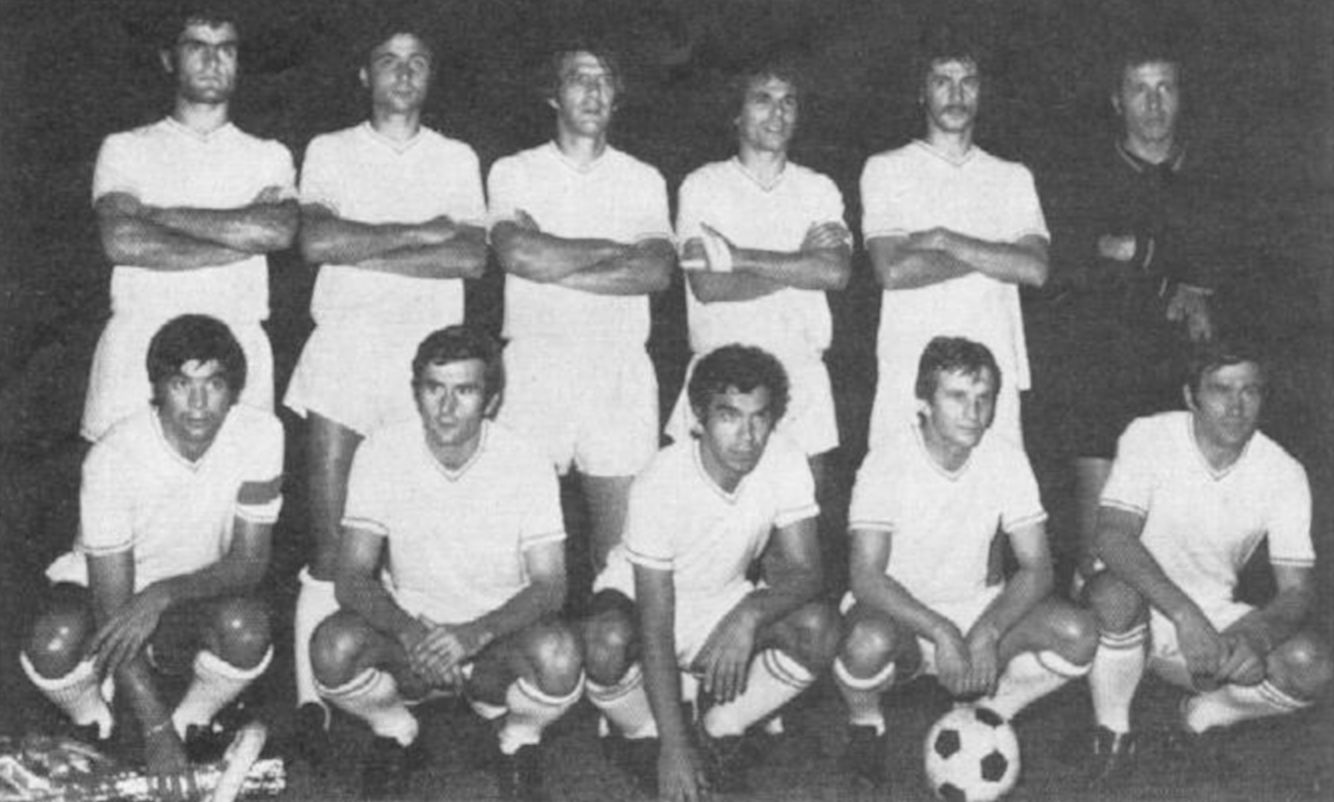
1974–75 Serie A runners-up Napoli squad

The 1974–75 season under coach and former Napoli player Luís Vinício was the closest Napoli had ever come to capturing the scudetto at this point. They ended the season just two points behind champions Juventus and the goal difference between the clubs was also only two. Although their efforts did not earn them the scudetto, it gained the club access into Europe for the 1974–75 UEFA Cup, where they reached the third round of the competition, knocking out Porto 2–0 along the way.

Napoli's second ever Coppa Italia trophy was won the same season, eliminating Milan and Fiorentina en route to the success; they beat Hellas Verona 4–0 in the final, with goals from Ginulfi, Braglia, and two from Giuseppe Savoldi. In the Anglo-Italian League Cup, Napoli beat English side Southampton 4–1 aggregate, which included a resounding 4–0 victory at home in Naples to win the competition.

Because the club had won the Coppa Italia the previous season, they gained access to the 1976–77 European Cup Winners' Cup, giving them their second shot at European football; Napoli managed to reach the semi-finals of the competition. In the last two seasons of the '70s, Napoli came in at sixth.

=== The Maradona era: League and European success ===
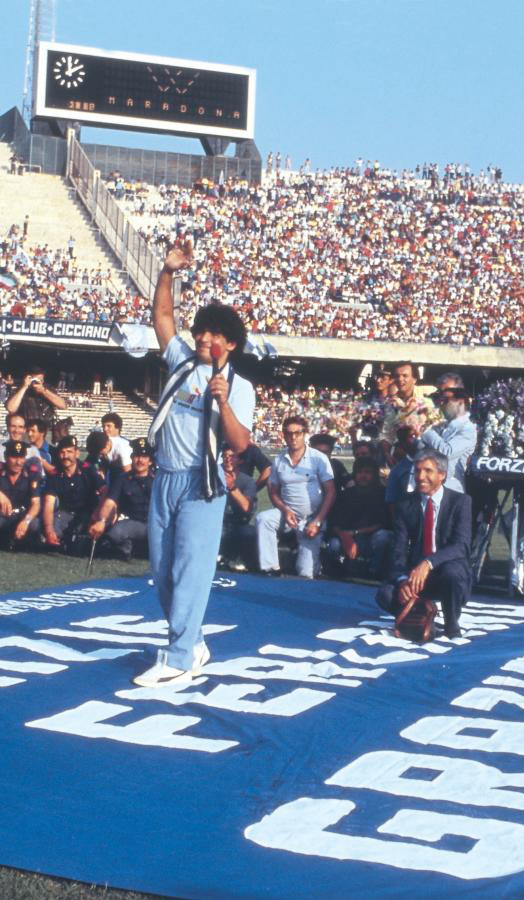
Maradona salutes the crowd at San Paolo Stadium during his presentation in Naples, 5 July 1984.

The 1980s for the club started in relatively good fashion with third- and fourth-place league positions early in the decade. But it was until Argentine Diego Maradona joined the club from Barcelona in 1984 that Napoli were on the world football map.

Success with Maradona was not instant. The club had to work hard, first with an eighth-place position in 1984–85, followed by a third-place finish in 1985–86. 1986–87 proved to be Napoli's year with Maradona; Napoli won the scudetto for the first time in their history. In so doing, they also became the first and only mainland Southern Italian team (not including Sardinian club Cagliari) to win the league, a record that still stands today. It was not just Serie A that the club won that season either, they also beat Atalanta 4–0 in the Coppa Italia final to complete the double.

In the subsequent year, the team were knocked out in the first round of the European Cup by Real Madrid but a runners-up spot in Serie A meant qualification for the UEFA Cup. Juventus and Bayern Munich were among Napoli's victims en route to the final where Maradona and Careca scored a goal apiece late in the second half to beat VfB Stuttgart two-one in the first leg. In the second leg, played in Stuttgart, the match ended in draw (3–3), ensuring Napoli's first ever European trophy. Napoli also reached the final of the Coppa Italia that year, only to be beaten by Sampdoria.

In 1990, Napoli were champions again, although in rather less auspicious circumstances than their previous Serie A title. They were awarded two points after the Brazilian Alemão was struck by a coin at Atalanta's Stadio Comunale. If this was not bad enough, Napoli's physio was caught on TV cameras exhorting the player to stay on the ground. Notwithstanding, these two points were not crucial, as Milan lost its match against Hellas Verona, meaning Napoli would have won the championship without the two points. During the Italian-hosted 1990 World Cup, however, Maradona made inflammatory remarks appealing to Neapolitans to cheer on his Argentina national team over the northern-dominated Italy national team.

The Napoli tifosi responded by displaying a banner in their "curva" that read, "Maradona, Naples loves you, but Italy is our homeland". It was touching for Maradona as Napoli was the only stadium during that World Cup in which the Argentinian national anthem was not jeered. Apparently, Napoli fans were the "black sheep" of Italy because they rooted for Maradona. He departed after testing positive for cocaine less than a year later, while the club was in financial crisis. Although he let his nightlife affect his legacy with Napoli, Maradona will still go down as the greatest Napoli player ever. He has mentioned many times that his love for Napoli is almost as much for his native team Boca Juniors.

The following year, the club won the Supercoppa Italiana, the last major trophy won by Napoli for 22 years, after defeating Juventus 5–1. The game included two goals from Careca, two from Andrea Silenzi and the fifth from Massimo Crippa; Roberto Baggio grabbed the consolation goal for the old lady. The result was a record margin victory in the competition for any club, a record still stands today.

=== Decline ===
The club started a slow decline after winning the Supercoppa Italiana. One by one, players such as Gianfranco Zola, Daniel Fonseca and Careca departed. During the earliest part of the 1990s, the club were still holding their own in the league, although lower than the Maradona era. Since a fourth-place finish was achieved in 1991–92, the club's league form diminished.

In 1997, Napoli reached the final of the Coppa Italia only to be beaten by Vicenza (1–0/0–3 a.e.t.). By this time, their league form was less successful and from 1996 onwards their league finishes were significantly lower. A first relegation to Serie B came in 1998 when they recorded just two wins all season.

During the summer of 1997, a large number of players were sold. These included André Cruz, Alain Boghossian, Fabio Pecchia, Roberto Bordin, Nicola Caccia and Alfredo Aglietti. Players like Roberto Ayala, Giuseppe Taglialatela and Francesco Turrini were among those from the 1996–97 squad which stayed on.

Napoli had to wait until the 1999–2000 season to achieve promotion as runners-up in Serie B back to Serie A. During their season back in Serie A, however, Napoli were relegated straight back down. Although the relegation battle was quite close, fellow struggling clubs Lecce and Hellas Verona had just one more point than the Azzurri, thus surviving at Napoli's expense.

In 2001–02, Napoli failed to gain promotion, missing out by one place in the Serie B table. This set off a spiral effect which saw the club slip further, and in the next season they finished a lowly 16th. Worse was to come for the club, however: with a debt estimated up to €70 million, the club was declared bankrupt in August 2004.

== Rebirth under De Laurentiis ==
Under the name Napoli Soccer, a new club was born thanks to film producer Aurelio De Laurentiis; the intention was to ensure the city of Naples was not left without a football team. During the first season down in Serie C1, Napoli narrowly missed out on promotion to Avellino after losing 2–1 in the play-offs.

In the 2005–06 season, Napoli went one better and won the Serie C1 championship, securing promotion on 15 April 2006 after a 2–0 win at the Stadio San Paolo to Perugia. Despite the fact that Napoli were playing in such a low division, they remained among clubs with the largest fan base in Italy. With higher average attendances than most Serie A clubs, (breaking the Serie C attendance record with 51,000 at one game) and six million fans worldwide. The club's name was restored back to S.S.C. Napoli in May 2006 by chairman De Laurentiis.

=== Return to Serie A ===
The team was one of the top clubs in Serie B. For a significant part of the season, Napoli was in second place, fighting for direct promotion to Serie A alongside Genoa. Both teams' fates were decided when second place Napoli, played third-place Genoa, which was only one point behind, on the final day. A win for either team would see that team promoted while a draw would see either Napoli or both teams promoted. This latter scenario, however, was not entirely in their hands: Fourth-place Piacenza, fighting to reduce the gap in third-place to less than ten points to reach a play-off spot, was hosting Triestina, which itself was fighting to escape relegation to Serie C1. But in order to reach the playoffs, Piacenza needed a victory.

On 10 June 2007, Napoli obtained direct promotion to Serie A. Their match finished in a 0–0 draw, but Piacenza were held to a 1–1 draw by Triestina after taking the lead, meaning both Napoli and Genoa were directly promoted to Serie A. When news arrived at Genoa's Stadio Luigi Ferraris of Piacenza's final result, players and fans from both teams began to celebrate in euphoria raiding the pitch, unaware that the referee still had not called full-time. The referee ordered that a minute of injury time was to be played. Once this finished, the celebrations officially began for two of Italy's sleeping giants. The 2007–08 campaign was the first for Napoli in Serie A since its last relegation in 2001, and the first time in Serie A under the reformed club following their bankruptcy.

Manager Edoardo Reja was sacked in March 2009 and former Italy national team manager Roberto Donadoni appointed as his replacement. He was sacked in October and replaced by former Sampdoria manager Walter Mazzarri. Under Mazzarri, Napoli climbed up the table, finishing in sixth place to qualify for a 2010–11 UEFA Europa League spot. Napoli, under Mazzarri's guide and reinforced by players such as Edinson Cavani, spent part of the 2010–11 season in second place, finishing third and qualifying directly to the group stage of the 2011–12 UEFA Champions League.

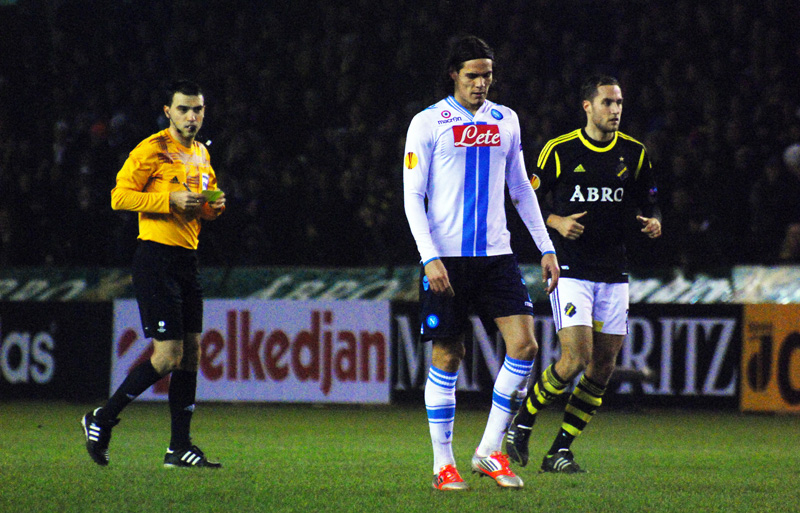
Edinson Cavani, Napoli's record sale, in a Europa League match for Napoli against AIK in 2012

In the 2011–12 season, Napoli ended in fifth place in Serie A, but managed to defeat unbeaten champions Juventus in the Stadio Olimpico to win the Coppa Italia for the fourth time in club history, 25 years after their last cup win. Cavani and Marek Hamšík scored the goals. Napoli also had a successful season in the 2011–12 UEFA Champions League, its first participation in Europe's top tournament since the 1990–91 season. The team finished second in its group behind Bayern Munich, and ahead of Manchester City, progressing to the round of 16, where they were eliminated by eventual winners Chelsea. In 2012–13, Napoli finished in second place in Serie A, the club's best performance since winning the 1989–90 scudetto. Cavani finished as top scorer in the division with 29 goals, which resulted in him being sold to Paris Saint-Germain for a club record fee of £57 million.

In the 2013 close-season, Walter Mazzarri left Napoli to become coach of Internazionale, and was replaced by Spaniard Rafael Benítez, who became the club's first foreign coach since Zdeněk Zeman in 2000. The money from selling Cavani went towards signing three Real Madrid players – Gonzalo Higuaín, Raúl Albiol and José Callejón – and other players, including Dries Mertens and Pepe Reina. They finished the season by winning the 2014 Coppa Italia final, their fifth title in the tournament, with a 3–1 win against Fiorentina with two goals from Lorenzo Insigne and another from Mertens, as well as qualifying for the Champions League by finishing third in Serie A. Benítez left for Real Madrid in May 2015 and was replaced by Maurizio Sarri.

In the 2017–18 season, Napoli challenged for the titles for the entire season, and finished with a club record of 91 points. However, the titles ultimately went to Juventus in the penultimate round of matches. On 23 December 2017, Marek Hamšík overtook Diego Maradona as Napoli's all-time leading scorer after scoring his 115th goal. At the end of the season, Sarri left for Chelsea, succeeded by Carlo Ancelotti in May 2018. He managed the club to another second-place finish, but was sacked on 10 December 2019, following a poor run of results in the 2019–20 season which left them seventh in the table. Gennaro Gattuso was named head coach the next day. On 14 June 2020, Dries Mertens became Napoli's all-time top scorer after scoring his 122nd goal in a Coppa Italia semi-finals match against Inter. Napoli went on to win the 2019–20 Coppa Italia in a penalty shoot-out against Juventus in the finals.

In December 2020, Napoli renamed San Paolo after Diego Maradona, after the death of their beloved club icon. Napoli finished fifth in Serie A that season after a draw on the finals day, missing a Champions League berth by one point.

In the 2021–22 season, Luciano Spalletti replaced Gennaro Gattuso as head coach and led the team to the third place in Serie A, securing a Champions League spot for the azzurri after a two-years absence.

In the 2022–23 season, Napoli clinched the Serie A titles for the first time since the 1989–90 season, and their third title overall, following a 1–1 draw against Udinese on 4 May 2023, their first time as titleholders since the days of Diego Maradona. Meanwhile, in the Champions League, Spalletti led them to the quarter-finals for the first time in their European history, where they were beaten 2–1 (1–0 away and 1–1 at home) by fellow Serie A side Milan.
