= List of Italian Football Championship clubs =

This is a complete list of Italian Football Championship clubs from the first season in 1898 to the present day.

== From 1898 to 1929 ==
=== A ===
Club	City	First season
A.C. Ligure Bolzaneto	Bolzaneto, Genoa	1914–15
A.C. Milanese	Milan	1913–14
Alba Roma	Flaminio, Rome	1912–13
Alba-Audace Roma	Flaminio, Rome	1926–27
Alessandria	Alessandria	1913–14
Amatori Torino	Turin	1919–20
Anconitana	Ancona	1921–22 (CCI)
Andrea Doria	Genoa	1903
Atalanta	Bergamo	1919–20
Audace Roma/Audace-Esperia	Rome	1912–13
Audace Taranto	Taranto	1921–22 (CCI)
Audace Torino	Turin	1902
Audacia Napoli	Naples	1920–21
Audax Modena	Modena	1914–15
Ausonia Milano	Milan	1909–10
Ausonia Pro Gorla	Gorla Primo, Milan	1919–20

=== B ===
Club	City	First season
Bagnolese	Bagnoli, Naples	1920–21
Bari	Bari	1928–29
Bentegodi Verona	Verona	1920–21
Biellese	Biella	1914–15
Bologna	Bologna	1910–11
Brescia	Brescia	1913–14

=== C ===
Club	City	First season
C.S. Firenze	Florence	1911–12
Carignano	Carignano	1920–21
Carpi	Carpi	1919–20
Casale	Casale Monferrato	1911–12
Casertana	Caserta	1925–26
Casteggio	Casteggio	1920–21
Cavese	Cava de' Tirreni	1922–23
Chiasso	Chiasso (Switzerland)	1914–15
Como	Como	1913–14
Cremonese	Cremona	1914–15

=== D ===
Club	City	First season
Derthona	Tortona	1922–23
Dolo	Dolo	1920–21

=== E ===
Club	City	First season
Enotria Goliardo	Milan	1919–20
Enotria Taranto	Taranto	1923–24
Esperia Como	Como	1922–23

=== F ===
Club	City	First season
F.B.C. Bari	Bari	1924–25
F.B.C. Torinese	Turin	1898
Fiorentina	Florence	1928–29
Fiumana	Fiume (now Rijeka in Croatia)	1928–29
Foggia	Foggia	1923–24
Fortitudo	Borgo, Rome	1913–14
Fortitudo-Pro Roma	Borgo, Rome	1926–27

=== G ===
Club	City	First season
G.S. Bolognese	Bologna	1919–20
Genoa	Genoa	1898
Gerbi Pisa	Pisa	1919–20
Ginnastica Torino	Turin	1898
Giovani Calciatori Cappuccini	Vercelli	1921–22 (FIGC)
Giovani Calciatori Genova	Genoa	1921–22 (FIGC)
Giovani Calciatori Legnanesi	Legnano	1920–21
Grifone G.C. Genova	Genoa	1919–20

=== H ===
Club	City	First season
Hellas Verona	Verona	1910–11

=== I ===
Club	City	First season
Ideale Bari	Bari	1922–23
Inter/Ambrosiana	Milan	1909
Internazionale Napoli	Naples	1912–13
Internazionale Torino	Turin	1898
Itala Firenze	Florence	1913–14

=== J ===
Club	City	First season
Juventus	Turin	1900
Juventus Audax	Rome	1912–13
Juventus Italia	Milan	1914–15

=== L ===
Club	City	First season
La Dominante Genova	Genoa	1927–28
Lazio	Rome	1912–13
Lecce	Lecce	1922–23
Libertas Firenze	Florence	1913–14
Libertas Milano	Milan	1919–20
Libertas Palermo	Palermo	1922–23
Liberty Bari	Bari	1921–22 (CCI)
Livorno	Livorno	1919–20
Lucchese	Lucca	1919–20

=== M ===
Club	City	First season
Maceratese	Macerata	1925–26
Mantova	Mantua	1919–20
Mantovana	Mantua	1921–22 (FIGC)
Mediolanum	Milan	1901
Messina	Messina	1922–23
Milan	Milan	1900
Modena	Modena	1912–13
Monza	Monza	1919–20

=== N ===
Club	City	First season
Naples	Naples	1912–13
Napoli/Internaples	Naples	1922–23
Nazionale Emilia	Bologna	1919–20
Nazionale Lombardia	Milan	1913–14
Novara	Novara	1912–13
Novese	Novi Ligure	1921–22 (FIGC)

=== P ===
Club	City	First season
Padova	Padua	1914–15
Palermo	Palermo	1921–22 (CCI)
Parma	Parma	1920–21
Pastore Torino	Turin	1919–20
Pavia	Pavia	1919–20
Petrarca Padova	Padua	1913–14
Piacenza	Piacenza	1920–21
Piemonte	Turin	1910–11
Pisa	Pisa	1912–13
Pistoiese	Pistoia	1928–29
Prato	Prato	1913–14
Pro Caserta	Caserta	1919–20
Pro Italia Taranto	Taranto	1921–22 (CCI)
Pro Livorno	Livorno	1921–22 (FIGC)
Pro Napoli	Naples	1919–20
Pro Patria	Busto Arsizio	1920–21
Pro Roma	Rome	1912–13
Pro Sesto	Sesto San Giovanni	1920–21
Pro Vercelli	Vercelli	1908
Puteolana	Pozzuoli	1919–20

=== R ===
Club	City	First season
Racing Libertas Club	Milan	1912–13
Reggiana	Reggio Emilia	1920–21
Rivarolese	Rivarolo Ligure, Genoa	1920–21
Roma	Rome	1927–28
Roman	Parioli, Rome	1912–13

=== S ===
Club	City	First season
Salernitana/Salernitanaudax	Salerno	1920–21
Sampierdarenese	Sampierdarena, Genoa	1900
Saronno	Saronno	1919–20
Savoia	Torre Annunziata	1920–21
Savona	Savona	1913–14
Schio	Schio	1920–21
Sestrese	Sestri Ponente, Genoa	1920–21
S.P.A.L.	Ferrara	1920–21
Speranza Savona	Savona	1921–22 (FIGC)
S.P.E.S. Genova	Genoa	1919–20
Spezia	La Spezia	1920–21
Stabia	Castellammare di Stabia	1921–22 (CCI)
Stelvio	Milan	1920–21

=== T ===
Club	City	First season
Tivoli	Tivoli	1921–22 (CCI)
Torino	Turin	1907
Trevigliese	Treviglio	1919–20
Treviso	Treviso	1920–21
Triestina	Trieste	1928–29

=== U ===
Club	City	First season
U.S. Alessandrina	Alessandria	1919–20
U.S. Milanese	Milan	1905
U.S. Romana	Rome	1919–20
U.S. Tarantina	Taranto	1924–25
U.S. Torinese	Turin	1919–20
Udinese	Udine	1913–14

=== V ===
Club	City	First season
Valenzana	Valenza	1914–15
Varese	Varese	1919–20
Veloces	Biella	1914–15
Venezia	Venice	1909
Viareggio	Viareggio	1920–21
Vicenza	Vicenza	1910–11
Vigor Senigallia	Senigallia	1921–22 (CCI)
Virtus Bologna	Bologna	1921–22 (FIGC)
Virtus Juventusque	Livorno	1912–13
Vittoria Roma	Rome	1921–22 (CCI)
Volontari Venezia	Venice	1912–13

== The 1921–22 C.C.I. championship ==
- Alba Roma – Rome
- Alessandria – Alessandria
- Anconitana – Ancona
- Andrea Doria – Genoa
- Audace Roma – Rome
- Audace Taranto – Taranto
- Bagnolese – Naples
- Bologna – Bologna
- Brescia – Brescia
- Casale – Casale Monferrato
- Folgore – Ancona
- Fortitudo – Rome
- Genoa – Genoa
- Helvia Recina – Macerata
- Internazionale – Milan
- Internazionale Napoli – Naples
- Juventus – Turin
- Juventus Audax – Rome
- Lazio – Rome
- Legnano – Legnano
- Libertas Palermo – Palermo
- Libertas Messina – Messina
- Liberty Bari – Bari
- Livorno – Livorno
- Macerata – Macerata
- Mantova – Mantua
- Messinese – Messina
- Milan – Milan
- Modena – Modena
- Naples – Naples
- Novara – Novara
- Padova – Padua
- Palermo – Palermo
- Pisa – Pisa
- Pro Italia Taranto – Taranto
- Pro Roma – Rome
- Pro Vercelli – Vercelli
- Puteolana – Pozzuoli
- Roman – Rome
- Salernitana – Salerno
- Savoia – Torre Annunziata
- Savona – Savona
- S.C. Messina – Messina
- Spezia – La Spezia
- Stabia – Castellammare di Stabia
- Tivoli – Tivoli
- Torino – Turin
- U.S. Milanese – Milan
- U.S. Romana – Rome
- Umberto I Messina – Messina
- Veloce Taranto – Taranto
- Venezia – Venice
- Verona – Verona
- Vicenza – Vicenza
- Vigor Senigallia – Senigallia
- Virtus – Ancona

== After 1928–1929 season: Serie A ==
In 1929 FIGC changed the mechanism of the championship, and created the Serie A as we know it today (a single league with 16, 18 or 20 teams).

There are 68 teams representing 62 cities that have taken part in 92 Serie A championships in a single round that was played from the 1929–30 season until the 2024–25 season. Milan, Turin, Genoa, Rome and Verona are the five cities that hosted derbies. Internazionale is the only team that has played Serie A football in every season. The teams in bold compete in Serie A currently.

- **93** seasons: **Internazionale**
- **92** seasons: **Juventus**, **Roma**
- **91** seasons: **Milan**
- **87** seasons: **Fiorentina**
- **82** seasons: **Lazio**
- **81** seasons: **Torino**
- **79** seasons: **Napoli**
- **78** seasons: **Bologna**
- **66** seasons: Sampdoria
- **64** seasons: **Atalanta**
- **57** seasons: **Genoa**
- **52** seasons: **Udinese**
- **44** seasons: **Cagliari**
- **34** seasons: **Hellas Verona**
- **30** seasons: Bari, Vicenza
- **29** seasons: Palermo
- **28** seasons: **Parma**
- **26** seasons: Triestina
- **23** seasons: Brescia
- **19** seasons: **Lecce**, SPAL
- **18** seasons: Livorno
- **17** seasons: Catania, Chievo, **Empoli**
- **16** seasons: Ascoli, Padova
- **14** seasons: **Como**, **Venezia**
- **13** seasons: Alessandria, Cesena, Modena, Novara, Perugia
- **12** seasons: Pro Patria
- **11** seasons: Foggia, Sassuolo
- **10** seasons: Avellino
- **9** seasons: Reggina, Siena
- **8** seasons: Cremonese, Lucchese, Piacenza, Sampierdarenese
- **7** seasons: Catanzaro, Mantova, Pescara, Pisa, Varese
- **6** seasons: Pro Vercelli
- **5** seasons: Messina, Salernitana
- **4** seasons: Casale
- **3** seasons: Crotone, Frosinone, Lecco, Legnano, **Monza**, Reggiana, Spezia
- **2** seasons: Ancona, Benevento, Ternana
- **1** season: Carpi, Pistoiese, Treviso

16 of these teams actually play in Serie B and 20 belong to the Serie C, while the remaining 11 clubs lost their professional status.

=== By province ===
56 out of the 62 cities that host past Serie A clubs are present-day provincial capitals, while 6 not. Consequently, 56 out the 107 provinces of Italy were represented in Serie A in their history, while 51 not yet.

=== By region ===
The following table lists the participations by region.

Region	Num. of teams	Teams (seasons)
Lombardy	11	**Internazionale** (92), **Milan** (90), **Atalanta** (63), Brescia (23), Como (13), Pro Patria (12), Cremonese (7), Mantova (7), Varese (7), Lecco (3), Legnano (3), **Monza** (2)
Emilia–Romagna	9	**Bologna** (77), Parma (27), SPAL (19), Cesena (13), Modena (13), **Sassuolo** (11), Piacenza (8), Reggiana (3), Carpi (1)
Tuscany	7	**Fiorentina** (86), Livorno (18), **Empoli** (16), Siena (9), Lucchese (8), Pisa (7), Pistoiese (1)
Piedmont	6	**Juventus** (91), **Torino** (80), Alessandria (13), Novara (13), Pro Vercelli (6), Casale (4)
Veneto	6	**Hellas Verona** (33), Vicenza (30), Chievo (17), Padova (16), Venezia (13), Treviso (1)
Liguria	4	Sampdoria (66), **Genoa** (56), Sampierdarenese (8), Spezia (3)
Campania	4	**Napoli** (78), Avellino (10), **Salernitana** (5), Benevento (2)
Apulia	3	Bari (30), **Lecce** (18), Foggia (11)
Calabria	3	Reggina (9), Catanzaro (7), Crotone (3)
Lazio	3	**Roma** (91), **Lazio** (79), **Frosinone** (3)
Sicily	3	Palermo (29), Catania (17), Messina (5)
Friuli-Venezia Giulia	2	**Udinese** (51), Triestina (26)
Marche	2	Ascoli (16), Ancona (2)
Umbria	2	Perugia (13), Ternana (2)
Abruzzo	1	Pescara (7)
Sardinia	1	**Cagliari** (43)
Aosta Valley; Basilicata; Molise; Trentino-Alto Adige/Südtirol	0	

Lombardy was the region with the biggest numbers of team in a single championship, six.

== War championships ==
=== 1944 Campionato Alta Italia ===
This championship was disputed during the second World War and won by Vigili del Fuoco di La Spezia (V.V.F. Spezia, Spezia Firefighters). It was not recognized by the FIGC until 2002 and assigned to Spezia Calcio 1906, though Spezia's Scudetto is considered a "decoration".

- Alessandria – Alessandria
- Internazionale – Milan
- Ampelea Isola d'Istria – Izola/Isola d'Istria
- Asti – Asti
- Atalanta – Bergamo
- Audace San Michele – Verona(*)
- Bassano – Bassano del Grappa
- Biellese – Biella
- Bologna – Bologna
- Brescia – Brescia
- Carpi – Carpi
- Casale – Casale Monferrato
- Centese – Cento
- Cesena – Cesena
- Cormonese – Cormons
- Corradini Suzzara – Suzzara
- Cremonese – Cremona
- Cuneo – Cuneo
- Faenza – Faenza
- Fanfulla – Lodi
- Fidentina – Fidenza
- Forlì – Forlì
- Forlimpopoli – Forlimpopoli
- Genova 1893 – Genoa
- Imola – Imola
- Juventus Cisitalia – Turin
- Lanerossi Schio – Schio
- Legnago – Legnago
- Liguria – Genoa
- Mantova – Mantua
- Marzotto Valdagno – Valdagno
- Mestre – Venice
- Milan – Milan
- Modena – Modena
- Monfalcone – Monfalcone
- Monti Padova – Padua
- Novara – Novara
- Orlandi Busseto – Busseto
- Padova – Padua
- Panigale – Bologna
- Parma – Parma
- Pellizzari Arzignano – Arzignano(*)
- Ponziana – Trieste
- Pro Gorizia – Gorizia
- Pro Patria – Busto Arsizio
- Ravenna – Ravenna
- Reggiana – Reggio Emilia
- Rovigo – Rovigo
- Sambonifacese – San Bonifacio
- San Giusto – Trieste
- San Pietro in Casale - San Pietro in Casale
- Torino FIAT – Turin
- Treviso – Treviso
- Triestina – Trieste
- Udinese – Udine
- Varese – Varese
- Venezia – Venice
- Verona – Verona
- Vicenza – Vicenza
- V.V.F. Spezia – La Spezia

(*) Audace San Michele and Pellizzari Arzignano retired after two matches.

=== The 1945–46 war championship ===
This championship is not usually included in the statistics, because some of the southern sides that took part to the competition were Serie B teams, while northern Serie B teams played at the second level with the Serie C teams. Torino's scudetto is considered official.

- Anconitana – Ancona (Serie B team)
- Andrea Doria – Genoa
- Atalanta – Bergamo
- Bari – Bari (Serie B team)
- Bologna – Bologna
- Brescia – Brescia
- Fiorentina – Florence
- Genoa – Genoa
- Internazionale – Milan
- Juventus – Turin
- Lazio – Rome
- Milan – Milan
- Modena – Modena
- Napoli – Naples (Serie B team)
- Palermo – Palermo (Serie B team)
- Pescara – Pescara (Serie B team)
- Pro Livorno – Livorno
- Roma – Rome
- Salernitana – Salerno (Serie B team)
- Sampierdarenese – Genoa
- Siena – Siena (Serie B team)
- Torino – Turin
- Triestina – Trieste
- Venezia – Venice
- Vicenza – Vicenza
