= Lipton Cup =

Lipton Cup may refer to:

- Copa Lipton, an association football trophy contested between Argentina and Uruguay
- Sir Thomas Lipton Trophy, an association football competition that took place in Turin, Italy
- Lipton Challenge Cup, an association football competition competed between clubs from Southern Italy and Sicily
