= List of football clubs in Italy =

This is a list of football clubs located in Italy, sorted by division, then alphabetically, and including geographical locations, home stadium information and club positions in the prior season.

== Clubs by division ==
=== Serie A ===
2025–26 Serie A clubs. For a complete list of clubs see List of Italian Football Championship clubs.

Club	City	Seasons of Serie A	Seasons of Serie B	Seasons of Serie C	Total	Stadium	Capacity
Atalanta	Bergamo	66	28	1	95	Gewiss Stadium	21,300
Bologna	Bologna	80	12	3	95	Stadio Renato Dall'Ara	38,279
Cagliari	Cagliari	46	30	11	87	Sardegna Arena	16,233
Como	Como	16	37	33	86	Stadio Giuseppe Sinigaglia	13,602
Fiorentina	Florence	89	5	1	95	Stadio Artemio Franchi	43,147
Frosinone	Frosinone	4	14	23	41	Stadio Benito Stirpe	16,227
Genoa	Genoa	59	34	2	95	Stadio Luigi Ferraris	36,685
Internazionale	Milan	95	-	-	95	San Siro	80,018
Juventus	Turin	94	1	-	95	Allianz Stadium	41,507
Lazio	Rome	84	11	-	95	Stadio Olimpico	72,698
Lecce	Lecce	21	29	38	88	Stadio Via del Mare	33,876
Milan	Milan	93	2	-	95	San Siro	80,018
Monza	Monza	4	41	39	84	Stadio Brianteo	18,568
Napoli	Naples	81	12	2	95	Stadio San Paolo	60,240
Parma	Parma	30	30	27	87	Stadio Ennio Tardini	27,906
Roma	Rome	94	1	-	95	Stadio Olimpico	72,698
Sassuolo	Sassuolo	13	6	16	35	Mapei Stadium – Città del Tricolore	23,717
Torino	Turin	83	12	-	95	Stadio Olimpico Grande Torino	27,994
Udinese	Udine	54	18	19	91	Stadio Friuli	25,132
Venezia	Venice	15	40	33	88	Stadio Pierluigi Penzo	7,450

=== Serie B ===
2026–27 Serie B clubs.

Club	City	Seasons of Serie A	Seasons of Serie B	Seasons of Serie C	Total	Stadium	Capacity
Arezzo	Arezzo	-	17	52	69	Stadio Città di Arezzo	13,128
Ascoli	Ascoli Piceno	16	28	29	73	Stadio Cino e Lillo Del Duca	12,461
Avellino	Avellino	10	21	36	67	Stadio Partenio	26,308
Benevento	Benevento	2	6	48	56	Stadio Ciro Vigorito	16,867
Carrarese	Carrara	-	5	61	66	Stadio dei Marmi	9,500
Catanzaro	Catanzaro	7	32	44	83	Stadio Nicola Ceravolo	14,650
Cesena	Cesena	13	35	24	72	Stadio Dino Manuzzi	23,860
Cremonese	Cremona	9	34	47	90	Stadio Giovanni Zini	20,641
Empoli	Empoli (Florence)	17	24	41	82	Stadio Carlo Castellani	16,284
Juve Stabia	Castellammare di Stabia	-	8	44	52	Romeo Menti	13,000
Mantova	Mantua	7	17	54	76	Stadio Danilo Martelli	14,884
Modena	Modena	13	55	26	94	Stadio Alberto Braglia	21,092
Padova	Padua	16	40	38	94	Stadio Euganeo	32,420
Palermo	Palermo	29	48	13	90	Stadio Renzo Barbera	36,365
Pisa	Pisa	8	39	36	83	Arena Garibaldi – Romeo Anconetani	10,000
Sampdoria	Genoa	69	22	4	95	Stadio Luigi Ferraris	36,685
Südtirol	Bolzano	-	5	22	27	Stadio Druso	3,500
Hellas Verona	Verona	35	54	6	95	Stadio Marc'Antonio Bentegodi	39,211
Vicenza	Vicenza	30	38	22	90	Romeo Menti	12,000
Virtus Entella	Chiavari (Genoa)	-	8	29	37	Stadio Enrico Sannazzari	5,535

=== Serie C ===
2025–26 Serie C clubs.

==== Group A (North) ====
Club	City	Seasons of Serie A	Seasons of Serie B	Seasons of Serie C	Total	Stadium	Capacity
AlbinoLeffe	Albino and Leffe	-	9	29	38	AlbinoLeffe Stadium	1,791
Alcione Milano	Sesto San Giovanni	-	-	3	3	Stadio Ernesto Breda	3,523
Arzignano Valchiampo	Arzignano	-	-	6	6	Tommaso Dal Molin Stadium	2,000
Carpi	Carpi	1	5	32	38	Stadio Sandro Cabassi	5,500
Cittadella	Cittadella (Padua)	-	18	18	36	Stadio Pier Cesare Tombolato	7,623
Desenzano	Desenzano del Garda	-	-	1	1	-	-
Dolomiti Bellunesi	Belluno	-	-	8	8	Stadio Polisportivo	2,585
Folgore Caratese	Carate Brianza	-	-	7	7	Stadio XXV Aprile	3,210
Giana Erminio	Gorgonzola	-	-	12	112	Stadio Città di Gorgonzola	3,766
Juventus Next Gen	Alessandria	-	-	9	9	Stadio Giuseppe Moccagatta	5,827
Lecco	Lecco	3	12	53	68	Stadio Rigamonti-Ceppi	4,977
Lumezzane	Lumezzane	-	-	28	28	Stadio Tullio Saleri	4,150
Novara	Novara	13	34	47	94	Stadio Silvio Piola	17,875
Ospitaletto	Ospitaletto	-	-	18	18	Gino Corioni	3,000
Pergolettese	Crema	-	-	39	39	Stadio Giuseppe Voltini	4,100
Pro Vercelli	Vercelli	6	13	53	72	Stadio Silvio Piola	5,500
Renate	Renate	-	-	17	17	Città di Meda (Meda)	3,000
Trento	Trento	-	-	39	39	Stadio Briamasco	4,227
Treviso	Treviso	1	16	49	66	Omobono Tenni	7,500
Union Brescia*	Brescia	23	66	6	95	Stadio Mario Rigamonti	16,743

- Union Brescia was founded in 2025 after FerralpiSalo purchased the rights to the Brescia name from the bankrupt club. It does not technically inherit the history of Brescia but is intended to be the city's replacement club at the same stadium following the year of Brescia's bankruptcy.

==== Group B (Central) ====
Club	City	Seasons of Serie A	Seasons of Serie B	Seasons of Serie C	Total	Stadium	Capacity
Atalanta U23	Caravaggio	-	-	4	4	Stadio Comunale	2,180
Campobasso	Campobasso	-	5	19	24	Stadio Nuovo Romagnoli	21,800
Forlì	Forlì	-	1	44	45	Stadio Tullo Morgagni	3,466
Grosseto	Grosseto	-	6	34	40	Carlo Zecchini	10,200
Gubbio	Gubbio	-	2	35	37	Stadio Pietro Barbetti	5,300
Guidonia Montecelio	Guidonia Montecelio	-	-	5	5	Comunale di Guidonia Montecelio	2,900
Latina	Latina	-	4	32	36	Stadio Domenico Francioni	9,398
Livorno	Livorno	18	27	44	89	Stadio Armando Picchi	14,267
Ostiamare	Ostia	-	-	3	3	Anco Marzio	1,000
Perugia	Perugia	13	29	36	78	Stadio Renato Curi	23,625
Pescara	Pescara	7	40	30	77	Stadio Adriatico – Giovanni Cornacchia	20,515
Pianese	Piancastagnaio	-	-	4	4	Stadio Carlo Zecchini (Grosseto)	2,300
Pineto	Pineto	-	-	4	4	Stadio Mariani-Pavone	1,000
Ravenna	Ravenna	-	7	51	58	Stadio Bruno Benelli	12,020
Reggiana	Reggio Emilia	3	37	46	86	Mapei Stadium – Città del Tricolore	23,717
Sambenedettese	San Benedetto del Tronto	-	21	43	64	Stadio Riviera delle Palme	14,995
Spezia	La Spezia	3	30	51	84	Stadio Alberto Picco	10,336
Torres	Sassari	-	-	48	48	Stadio Vanni Sanna	7,480
Vado	Vado	-	-	6	6	Ferruccio Chittolina	2000
Vis Pesaro	Pesaro	-	-	42	42	Tonino Benelli	4,898

==== Group C (South) ====
Club	City	Seasons of Serie A	Seasons of Serie B	Seasons of Serie C	Total	Stadium	Capacity
Audace Cerignola	Cerignola	-	-	9	9	Stadio Domenico Monterisi	7,453
Bari	Bari	30	50	12	92	Stadio San Nicola	58,270
Barletta	Barletta	-	4	37	41	Stadio Cosimo Puttilli	8449
Casarano	Casarano	-	-	37	37	Stadio Giuseppe Capozza	6,500
Casertana	Caserta	-	2	44	46	Alberto Pinto	12,000
Catania	Catania	17	35	33	86	Angelo Massimino	20,266
Cavese	Cava de' Tirreni	-	3	40	43	Stadio Simonetta Lamberti	5,200
Cosenza	Cosenza	-	26	46	72	Stadio San Vito-Gigi Marulla	24,209
Crotone	Crotone	3	14	40	57	Stadio Ezio Scida	16,640
Foggia	Foggia	11	25	46	82	Stadio Pino Zaccheria	25,085
Giugliano	Giugliano in Campania	-	-	14	14	Stadio Alberto De Cristofaro	6,000
Inter U23	Monza	-	-	2	2	Stadio Brianteo	17,102
Monopoli	Monopoli	-	-	32	32	Stadio Vito Simone Veneziani	6,880
Picerno	Picerno	-	-	7	7	Donato Curcio	5,500
Potenza	Potenza	-	5	46	51	Alfredo Viviani	6,000
Salernitana	Salerno	5	31	52	88	Stadio Arechi	37,180
Savoia	Torre Annunziata	-	3	28	31	Alfredo Giraud	12,750
Scafatese	Scafati	-	2	7	9	28 settembre 1943-Giovanni Vitiello	2,605
Sorrento	Sorrento	-	1	31	32	Stadio Italia	3,600
Team Altamura	Altamura	-	-	8	8	Comunale Tonino D'Angelo	3,000

=== Former Professional Teams ===
==== Former Professional Teams Active or Recently Active in Italian Pyramid ====
Club	City	Seasons of Serie A	Seasons of Serie B	Seasons of Serie C/C1/C2	Total Professional Seasons since 1929-30	Current Level in Pyramid	Last Professional Season
A.C. Virtus Bolzano	Bolzano	-	1	19	20	4. Serie D	2017
Acireale	Acireale	-	2	28	30	4. Serie D	2006
Acqui	Acqui Terme	-	-	7	7	5. Eccellenza	1943
Adriese	Adria	-	-	3	3	4. Serie D	1981
Afragolese	Afragola	-	-	6	6	4. Serie D	1989
Aglianese	Agliana	-	-	3	3	7. Prima Categoria	2005
Akragas	Agrigento	-	-	19	19	5. Eccellenza	2018
Albanova	Casal di Principe	-	-	4	4	5. Eccellenza	1998
Albenga	Albenga	-	-	3	3	7. Prima Categoria	1941
Albese	Alba	-	-	4	4	5. Eccellenza	1982
Albissola	Albissola Marina e Albisola Superiore	-	-	1	1	6. Promozione	2019
Alcamo	Alcamo	-	-	8	8	6. Promozione	1985
Alessandria	Alessandria	13	21	53	87	6. Promozione	2024
Alghero	Alghero	-	-	2	2	6. Promozione	2010
Appio Latino Metronio Associazione Sportiva (ALMAS)	Rome	-	-	4	4	8. Seconda Categoria	1982
Ancona	Ancona	2	21	46	69	4. Serie D	2024
Angizia Luco 1925	Luco dei Marsi	-	-	3	3	6. Promozione	1988
Aosta	Aosta	-	-	7	7	8. Seconda Categoria	1995
Arona	Arona	-	-	2	2	6. Promozione	1981
Ars et Labor Ferrara (formerly SPAL)	Ferrara	19	24	45	88	5. Eccellenza	2025
Arzachena	Arzachena	-	-	2	2	6. Promozione	2019
Asti	Asti	-	-	24	24	4. Serie D	1987
Astrea	Rome	-	-	8	8	5. Eccellenza	1999
Atletico Catania	Catania	-	-	8	8	6. Promozione	2001
Atletico Morro d'Oro	Morro d'Oro	-	-	1	1	7. Prima Categoria	2005
Atletico Tricase	Tricase	-	-	5	5	6. Promozione	2002
Audace San Michele Extra	San Michele Extra (Verona)	-	-	8	8	6. Promozione	1979
Aurora Desio	Desio	-	-	1	1	9. Terza Categoria	1980
Aversa Normanna	Aversa	-	-	7	7	4. Serie D	2015
Avezzano	Avezzano	-	-	12	12	6. Promozione	1998
Bassano Virtus	Bassano del Grappa	-	-	15	15	4. Serie D	2018
Battipagliese	Battipaglia	-	-	15	15	5. Eccellenza	2000
Bellaria Igea Marina	Bellaria-Igea Marina	-	-	11	11	6. Promozione	2014
Biellese	Biella	-	2	42	44	5. Eccellenza	2007
Bisceglie	Bisceglie	-	-	22	22	5. Eccellenza	2021
Borgo a Buggiano	Borgo a Buggiano	-	-	2	2	8. Seconda Categoria	2013
Bra	Bra	-	-	5	5	4. Serie D	2026
Brembilese	Brembilla	-	-	1	1	8. Seconda Categoria	1984
Brescello	Brescello	-	-	9	9	5. Eccellenza	2003
Brindisi	Brindisi	-	6	32	38	5. Eccellenza	2024
Cairese	Cairo Montenotte	-	-	1	1	4. Serie D	1986
Caldiero Terme	Caldiero	-	-	1	1	4. Serie D	2025
Campania Ponticelli	Naples	-	-	6	6	9. Terza Categoria	1986
Campania Puteolana	Pozzuoli	-	-	9	9	5. Eccellenza	2003
Canavese	San Giusto Canavese	-	-	4	4	8. Seconda Categoria	2011
Canicattì	Canicattì	-	-	6	6	N/A	1986
Cantù	Cantù	-	-	5	5	6. Promozione	1943
Carbonia	Carbonia	-	-	17	17	5. Eccellenza	1988
Carpenedolo	Carpenedolo	-	-	6	6	5. Eccellenza	2010
Casale	Casale Monferrato	4	4	37	45	4. Serie D	2013
Casalotti	Casalotti	-	-	1	1	8. Seconda Categoria	1981
Casatese	Casatenovo	-	-	2	2	4. Serie D	1982
Casoria	Casoria	-	-	2	2	6. Promozione	1983
Cassino	Cassino	-	-	6	6	4. Serie D	2010
Castel di Sangro	Castel di Sangro	-	2	14	16	5. Eccellenza	2005
Castelnuovo	Castelnuovo di Garfagnana	-	-	9	9	5. Eccellenza	2008
Castiglione	Castiglione delle Stiviere	-	-	2	2	5. Eccellenza	2014
Castrovillari	Castrovillari	-	-	7	7	5. Eccellenza	2001
Cattolica	Cattolica	-	-	5	5	8. Seconda Categoria	1985
Cecina	Cecina, Tuscany	-	-	12	12	5. Eccellenza	1996
Celano	Celano	-	-	10	10	5. Eccellenza	2012
Centese	Cento	-	1	14	15	6. Promozione	1996
Cerretese	Cerreto Guidi	-	-	6	6	5. Eccellenza	1984
Cerveteri	Cerveteri	-	-	3	3	6. Promozione	1994
Chiarbola Ponziana	Trieste	-	-	9	9	5. Eccellenza	1952
Chieti	Chieti	-	-	49	49	4. Serie D	2014
Chievo	Verona	17	10	13	40	4. Serie D	2021
Città di Castello	Città di Castello	-	-	6	6	6. Promozione	1981
Civitanovese	Civitanova Marche	-	-	19	19	5. Eccellenza	1994
Civitavecchia	Civitavecchia	-	-	18	18	5. Eccellenza	1988
Codogno	Codogno	-	-	2	2	5. Eccellenza	1943
Colleferro	Colleferro	-	-	5	5	5. Eccellenza	1956
Colligiana	Colle di Val d'Elsa	-	-	2	2	5. Eccellenza	1991
Conegliano	Conegliano	-	-	5	5	4. Serie D	1983
Corniglianese	Cornigliano (Genoa)	-	-	1	1	8. Seconda Categoria	1937
Cossatese	Cossato	-	-	1	1	6. Promozione	1973
Crema	Crema	-	2	12	14	4. Serie D	1952
Crevalcore	Crevalcore	-	-	2	2	8. Seconda Categoria	1995
Cuneo	Cuneo	-	-	17	17	5. Eccellenza	2019
Cuoiopelli	Santa Croce sull'Arno	-	-	4	4	5. Eccellenza	1990
Cynthia	Genzano di Roma	-	-	2	2	6. Promozione	1999
Derthona	Tortona	-	3	24	27	4. Serie D	1991
Ebolitana	Ebolitana	-	-	1	1	5. Eccellenza	2012
Elpidiense	Sant'Elpidio a Mare	-	-	2	2	6. Promozione	1984
Enna	Enna	-	-	3	3	4. Serie D	1991
Ercolanese	Ercolano	-	-	7	7	5. Eccellenza	1988
Faenza	Faenza	-	-	4	4	5. Eccellenza	2002
Fanfulla	Lodi	-	12	19	31	5. Eccellenza	1986
Fano	Fano	-	-	43	43	Excluded from 5. Eccellenza	2021
Fasano	Fasano	-	-	9	9	4. Serie D	2002
FC Voluntas (Montichiari)	Montichiari	-	-	11	11	7. Prima Categoria	2012
FeralpiSalò	Salò	-	1	15	16	N/A - Transferred license to US Brescia	2025
Fermana	Fermo	-	1	37	38	5. Eccellenza	2024
FIAT	Turin	-	-	1	1	N/A	1939
Fidelis Andria	Andria	-	6	28	34	4. Serie D	2023
Figline	Figline Valdarno	-	-	2	2	5. Eccellenza	2010
Fiorenzuola	Fiorenzuola d'Arda	-	-	15	15	5. Eccellenza	2024
Foligno	Foligno	-	-	17	17	4. Serie D	2008
Fondi	Fondi	-	-	5	5	7. Prima Categoria	2018
Forlimpopoli	Forlimpopoli	-	-	8	8	7. Prima Categoria	1943
Formia	Formia	-	-	8	8	8. Seconda Categoria	1995
Forte dei Marmi	Forte dei Marmi	-	-	3	3	5. Eccellenza	1943
Fossanese	Fossano	-	-	4	4	4. Serie D	1952
Francavilla	Francavilla al Mare	-	-	15	15	6. Promozione	1993
Frattese	Frattamaggiore	-	-	5	5	5. Eccellenza	1985
Fucecchio	Fucecchio	-	-	4	4	5. Eccellenza	1950
Galaxy FC (Mira)	Mira	-	-	5	5	7. Prima Categoria	1985
Gallaratese	Gallaratese (Milan)	-	2	12	14	6. Promozione	1952
Gallipoli	Gallipoli	-	1	5	6	5. Eccellenza	2010
Gavorrano	Gavorrano	-	-	5	5	4. Serie D	2014
Gela	Gela	-	-	15	15	4. Serie D	2011
Gelbison	Vallo della Lucania	-	-	1	1	4. Serie D	2023
Giarre	Giarre	-	-	8	8	5. Eccellenza	1994
Gioiese	Gioia Tauro	-	-	2	2	5. Eccellenza	1983
Giorgione	Giorgione	-	-	12	12	5. Eccellenza	2000
Giulianova	Giulianova	-	-	40	40	4. Serie D	2012
Gladiator	Santa Maria Capua Vetere	-	-	3	3	5. Eccellenza	1986
Gozzano	Gozzano	-	-	2	2	4. Serie D	2020
Grumese	Grumo Nevano	-	-	2	2	7. Prima Categoria	1984
Gualdo	Gualdo Tadino	-	-	20	20	7. Prima Categoria	2006
Igea Virtus	Barcellona Pozzo di Gotto	-	-	16	16	4. Serie D	2010
Ilva Bagnolese	Ilva Bagnolese	-	-	8	8	8. Seconda Categoria	1943
Ilvamaddalena	La Maddalena	-	-	1	1	4. Serie D	1989
Imolese	Imola	-	-	19	19	4. Serie D	2023
Imperia	Imperia	-	-	14	14	4. Serie D	2000
Internapoli	Naples	-	-	4	4	7. Prima Categoria	1971
Iperzola (Zola Predosa)	Zola Predosa	-	-	2	2	5. Eccellenza	1998
Ischia	Ischia	-	-	18	18	4. Serie D	2016
Isernia	Isernia	-	-	3	3	5. Eccellenza	2004
Isola Liri	Isola Liri	-	-	4	4	7. Prima Categoria	2012
Itala San Marco	Gradisca d'Isonzo	-	-	2	2	9. Terza Categoria	2010
Ivrea	Ivrea	-	-	13	13	6. Promozione	2007
Jesina	Jesi	-	-	22	22	5. Eccellenza	1991
Juventus Domo	Domodossola	-	-	7	7	6. Promozione	1990
La Palma	Cagliari	-	-	1	1	7. Prima Categoria	1990
Lanciotto	Campi Bisenzio	-	-	1	1	5. Eccellenza	1952
L'Aquila	L'Aquila	-	3	33	36	4. Serie D	2016
L'École de Football Saint-Christophe (Vallée d'Aoste)	Vallée d'Aoste	-	-	1	1	8. Seconda Categoria	2013
Legnago Salus	Legnago	-	-	4	4	4. Serie D	2025
Legnano	Legnano	3	14	53	70	5. Eccellenza	2010
Leonzio	Lentini	-	-	9	9	5. Eccellenza	2020
Libertas Trieste	Trieste	-	-	3	3	N/A	1949
Licata	Licata	-	2	10	12	4. Serie D	1994
Lupranese	San Martino di Lupari	-	-	1	1	4. Serie D	1950
Lodigiani	Rome	-	-	22	22	5. Eccellenza	2005
Lucchese	Lucca	8	19	49	76	5. Eccellenza	2025
Luino	Luino	-	-	2	2	6. Promozione	1951
Maceratese	Macerata	-	1	36	37	4. Serie D	2017
Magenta	Magenta	-	1	2	3	5. Eccellenza	1951
Manfredonia	Manfredonia	-	-	10	10	4. Serie D	2010
Marsala	Marsala	-	-	28	28	5. Eccellenza	2000
Martina	Martina Franca	-	-	24	24	4. Serie D	2016
Massese	Massa	-	1	33	34	5. Eccellenza	2008
Matelica	Matelica	-	-	1	1	5. Eccellenza	2021
Matera	Matera	-	1	29	30	Excluded from 4. Serie D	2019
Meda	Meda	-	-	8	8	6. Promozione	2004
Melfi	Melfi	-	-	14	14	5. Eccellenza	2017
Melzo	Melzo	-	-	1	1	8. Seconda Categoria	1938
Messina	Messina	5	32	33	70	4. Serie D	2025
Mestre	Mestre (Venice)	-	1	40	41	4. Serie D	2018
Mezzocorona	Mezzocorona	-	-	4	4	8. Seconda Categoria	2011
Milan Futuro	Milan	-	-	1	1	4. Serie D	2025
Milazzo	Milazzo	-	-	3	3	4. Serie D	2013
Mirandolese	Mirandolese	-	-	1	1	8. Seconda Categoria	1948
Modica	Modica	-	-	2	2	5. Eccellenza	2006
Molfetta	Molfetta	-	-	14	14	8. Seconda Categoria	1995
Molinella	Molinella	-	1	3	4	7. Prima Categoria	1942
Moncalieri	Moncalieri	-	-	1	1	6. Promozione	2001
Monfalcone	Monfalcone	-	4	15	19	5. Eccellenza	1971
Monselice	Monselice	-	-	5	5	6. Promozione	1983
Monsummanese	Monsummano Terme	-	-	2	2	6. Promozione	1950
Montebelluna	Montebelluna	-	-	7	7	7. Prima Categoria	1997
Montecatini	Montecatini Terme	-	-	5	5	N/A (6. Promozione)	1983
Montevarchi	Montevarchi	-	-	38	38	4. Serie D	2023
Mortara	Mortara	-	-	3	3	N/A (8. Seconda Categoria)	1951
Nardò	Nardò	-	-	8	8	4. Serie D	2002
Nissa	Caltanissetta	-	-	7	7	4. Serie D	1987
Nocerina	Nocera Inferiore	-	3	33	36	4. Serie D	2014
Noicattaro	Noicattaro	-	-	3	3	7. Prima Categoria	2010
Nola	Nola	-	-	18	18	4. Serie D	1996
Novese	Novi Ligure	-	-	3	3	6. Promozione	1975
Nuorese	Nuoro	-	-	3	3	5. Eccellenza	2008
Olbia	Olbia	-	-	42	42	4. Serie D	2024
Omegna	Omegna	-	-	17	17	7. Prima Categoria	1986
Orbetello	Orbetello	-	-	4	4	6. Promozione	1943
Orceana	Orzinuovi	-	-	4	4	5. Eccellenza	1990
Osimana	Osimo	-	-	6	6	5. Eccellenza	1984
Paganese	Pagani	-	-	27	27	4. Serie D	2022
Palazzolo	Palazzolo sull'Oglio	-	-	14	14	4. Serie D	2005
Palmese	Palma Campania	-	-	11	11	4. Serie D	2004
Panigale	Panigale	-	-	2	2	6. Promozione	1943
Parabiago	Parabiago	-	-	3	3	7. Prima Categoria	1952
Paternò	Paternò	-	-	3	3	4. Serie D	2004
Pavia	Pavia	-	4	48	52	4. Serie D	2016
Piacenza	Piacenza	8	18	50	76	4. Serie D	2023
Pieris	San Canzian d'Isonzo	-	-	3	3	9. Terza Categoria	1943
Pietrasanta	Pietrasanta	-	-	1	1	6. Promozione	1980
Pievigina	Pieve di Soligo	-	-	4	4	5. Eccellenza	1991
Pinerolo	Pinerolo	-	-	5	5	5. Eccellenza	1941
Piombino	Piombino	-	3	8	11	6. Promozione	1956
Pistoiese	Pistoia	1	19	45	65	4. Serie D	2022
Poggese	Poggio Rusco	-	-	1	1	5. Eccellenza	2002
Poggibonsi	Poggibonsi	-	-	17	17	4. Serie D	2014
Pomezia	Pomezia	-	-	1	1	5. Eccellenza	2011
Pomigliano	Pomigliano	-	-	1	1	5. Eccellenza	1950
Ponsacco	Ponsacco	-	-	8	8	7. Prima Categoria	1997
Ponte San Pietro Isola	Ponte San Pietro	-	1	6	7	5. Eccellenza	1952
Pontedecimo	Pontedecimo	-	-	6	6	8. Seconda Categoria	1941
Pontedera	Pontedera	-	-	46	46	4. Serie D	2026
Popoli	Popoli Terme	-	-	3	3	7. Prima Categoria	1940
Pordenone	Pordenone	-	3	25	28	5. Eccellenza	2023
Portogruaro	Portogruaro	-	1	8	9	4. Serie D	2013
Prato	Prato	-	10	66	76	4. Serie D	2018
Pro Gioia	Gioia del Colle	-	-	1	1	8. Seconda Categoria	1943
Pro Gorizia	Gorizia	-	2	15	17	5. Eccellenza	1985
Pro Italia Correggio	Correggio	-	-	2	2	4. Serie D	1948
Pro Italia Galatina	Galatina	-	-	5	5	5. Eccellenza	1988
Pro Lissone	Lissone	-	-	5	5	7. Prima Categoria	1952
Pro Mogliano	Mogliano	-	-	1	1	6. Promozione	1943
Pro Patria	Busto Arsizio	12	13	57	82	4. Serie D	2026
Pro Sesto	Sesto San Giovanni	-	4	51	55	4. Serie D	2024
Ragusa	Ragusa	-	-	7	7	4. Serie D	2005
Rapallo	Rapallo	-	-	13	13	7. Prima Categoria (No Participation)	1969
Real Marcianise	Marcianise	-	-	5	5	9. Terza Categoria	2010
Recanatese	Recanati	-	-	2	2	4. Serie D	2022
Reggina	Reggio Calabria	9	25	37	71	4. Serie D	2023
Rende	Rende	-	-	15	15	6. Promozione	2020
Rhodense	Rho	-	-	7	7	5. Eccellenza	1985
Riccione	Riccione	-	-	11	11	6. Promozione	1991
Rieti	Rieti	-	2	7	9	5. Eccellenza	2020
Rimini	Rimini	-	9	62	71	4. Serie D	2026
Rivarolese	Genoa	-	-	6	6	8. Seconda Categoria	1952
Rondinella Marzocco	Florence	-	-	14	14	5. Eccellenza	2002
Rosetana	Rosetana	-	-	2	2	6. Promozione	2005
Rosignano Solvay	Rosignano Solvay	-	-	5	5	7. Prima Categoria	1963
Rovereto	Rovereto	-	-	6	6	5. Eccellenza	1973
Rovigo	Rovigo	-	-	12	12	6. Promozione	2008
Russi	Russi	-	-	1	1	5. Eccellenza	2001
Rutigliano	Rutigliano	-	-	1	1	6. Promozione	2004
Sacilese	Sacile	-	-	3	3	8. Seconda Categoria	2011
Samboinfacese	San Bonifacio	-	-	4	4	7. Prima Categoria	2012
San Donato Tavarnelle	Montevarchi	-	-	1	1	4. Serie D	2023
San Marino	Acquaviva	-	-	16	16	4. Serie D	2015
San Severo	San Severo	-	-	1	1	6. Promozione	1948
Sandonà	San Donà di Piave	-	-	12	12	5. Eccellenza	2001
Sangiovannese	San Giovanni Valdarno	-	-	23	23	5. Eccellenza	2011
Sangiuliano City	Sangiuliano City	-	-	1	1	4. Serie D	2023
Sangiustese	Monte San Giusto	-	-	2	2	5. Eccellenza	2010
Sanremese	Sanremo	-	3	35	38	4. Serie D	2011
Sansepolcro	Sansepolcro	-	-	2	2	6. Promozione	1981
Sansovino	Monte San Savino	-	-	5	5	5. Eccellenza	2008
Sant'Angelo	Sant'Angelo Lodigiano	-	-	10	10	4. Serie D	1984
Santarcangelo	Santarcangelo di Romagna	-	-	7	7	5. Eccellenza	2018
Sant'Elena	Quartu Sant'Elena	-	-	4	4	6. Promozione	1984
Saronno	Saronno	-	-	14	14	5. Eccellenza	2000
Saviglianese	Savigliano	-	-	5	5	6. Promozione	1983
Savona	Savona	-	5	39	44	6. Promozione	2016
Schio	Schio	-	-	5	5	5. Eccellenza	1943
Seregno	Seregno	-	6	24	30	5. Eccellenza	2022
Sestese	Sesto Fiorentino	-	-	3	3	5. Eccellenza	1939
Sestrese	Sestrese	-	1	11	12	5. Eccellenza	1951
Sestri Levante	Sestri Levante	-	-	3	3	4. Serie D	2025
Settimo	Settimo Torinese	-	-	1	1	5. Eccellenza	1943
Siderno	Siderno	-	-	3	3	7. Prima Categoria	1943
Siena	Siena	9	13	51	73	4. Serie D	2023
Signa	Signa	-	-	10	10	5. Eccellenza	1951
Siracusa	Siracusa	-	7	51	58	4. Serie D	2026
Solbiatese	Solbiate Arno	-	-	21	21	5. Eccellenza	1998
Sora	Sora	-	-	15	15	4. Serie D	2005
Sorso	Sorso	-	-	4	4	7. Prima Categoria	1989
Squinzano	Squinzano	-	-	3	3	6. Promozione	1982
Stasia	Sant'Anastasia	-	-	3	3	5. Eccellenza	2002
Suzzara	Suzzara	-	2	11	13	7. Prima Categoria	1993
Taranto	Taranto	-	32	42	74	4. Serie D	2025
Tempio	Tempio Pausania	-	-	13	13	5. Eccellenza	2000
Teramo	Teramo	-	-	45	45	4. Serie D	2022
Ternana	Terni	2	30	37	69	4. Serie D	2026
Tevere Roma	Rome	-	-	6	6	8. Seconda Categoria	1965
Thiene	Thiene	-	-	2	2	6. Promozione	2003
Tivoli	Tivoli	-	-	4	4	5. Eccellenza	2004
Tolentino	Tolentino	-	-	5	5	5. Eccellenza	2005
Toma Maglie	Maglie	-	-	4	4	5. Eccellenza	1954
Torviscosa	Torviscosa	-	-	1	1	9. Terza Categoria	1952
Trani	Trani	-	2	17	19	5. Eccellenza	1996
Trapani	Trapani	-	5	41	46	4. Serie D	2026
Trastevere	Rome	-	1	4	5	4. Serie D	1943
Trevigliese	Treviglio	-	-	5	5	4. Serie D	1970
Triestina	Trieste	26	22	37	85	4. Serie D	2026
Tritium	Tritium	-	-	3	3	5. Eccellenza	2013
Turris	Torre del Greco	-	-	36	36	Excluded from 3. Serie C	2024
Tuttocuoio	San Miniato	-	-	3	3	4. Serie D	2017
Union Clodiense Chioggia Sottomarina	Chioggia	-	-	8	8	4. Serie D	2025
Val di Sangro	Val di Sangro	-	-	3	3	7. Prima Categoria	2008
Valdagno (formerly A.C. Marzotto)	Valdagno	-	10	25	35	7. Prima Categoria	1997
Valenzana	Valenza	-	-	11	11	4. Serie D	2012
Varazze	Varazze	-	-	2	2	4. Serie D	1942
Varese	Varese	7	21	39	67	4. Serie D	2015
Vastese (formerly Pro Vasto)	Vasto	-	-	19	19	5. Eccellenza	2007
Verbania	Verbania	-	-	7	7	5. Eccellenza	1973
Ventimigliese	Ventimiglia	-	-	1	1	7. Prima Categoria	1936
Viareggio	Viareggio	-	6	26	32	5. Eccellenza	2014
Vibonese	Vibo Valentia	-	-	11	11	4. Serie D	2022
Vico Equense	Vico Equense	-	-	1	1	7. Prima Categoria	2010
Vigevano	Vigevano	-	11	17	28	5. Eccellenza	1979
Vigor Lamezia	Lamezia Terme	-	-	19	19	4. Serie D	2015
Vigor Senigallia	Senigallia	-	-	4	4	4. Serie D	1985
Villacidrese	Villacidrese	-	-	2	2	6. Promozione	2011
Virtus Francavilla	Francavilla Fontana	-	-	8	8	4. Serie D	2024
Virtus Spoleto	Spoleto	-	-	1	1	5. Eccellenza	1943
Virtus Verona	Verona	-	-	9	9	4. Serie D	2026
Vis Nova Giussano	Giussano	-	-	1	1	5. Eccellenza	1943
Viterbese	Viterbo	-	-	24	24	5. Eccellenza	2023
Vittoria	Vittoria	-	-	10	10	5. Eccellenza	2006
Vittorio San Martino Colle	Vittorio Veneto	-	-	6	6	5. Eccellenza	1965
Vogherese	Voghera	-	2	15	17	4. Serie D	1999

Note that the post-war 1946 through 1948 seasons are generally not characterized as a professional season except for three clubs which were only a professional team during these seasons. Teams listed with an earlier Last Professional Season were also typically in the unofficial 1948 Serie C.

Serie C / Lega Pro / Serie C1 / Serie C2 season counts are sometimes inconsistent but directionally accurate with counts consistent with Italian Wikipedia.

==== Former Professional Teams Eliminated Through Merger ====
Sampdoria is treated as inheriting the history of Andrea Doria as a result of its merger with another professional club Sampierdarenese in 1946. Sampierdarenese previously absorbed professional club AC Liguria in 1919.

ASD Trastevere is treated as inheriting the history of Alba Trastevere, from which it purchased the sporting title in 1968.

UC AlbinoLeffe is treated as inheriting the history of Albinese Calcio as a result of its merger with a semi-pro club, Società Calcio Leffe, in 1998.

Vogherese merged with professional club SBC Oltrepò in 2013 to regain its sporting title but is not treated as inheriting the history of the less historic professional team.

Dolomiti Bellunesi is treated as inheriting the history of AC Belluno 1905 as a result of its 2021 merger with non-professional clubs, Union Feltre and Union S. Giorgio Sedico.

==== Former Professional Teams Removed by Italian National Boundary Changes ====
Following World War II, the following professional teams no longer fell within the Italian national borders and joined the professional leagues in Yugoslavia:

- Grion Pola (3 seasons at Serie B, 8 seasons at Serie C)
- Fiumana (2 seasons at Serie B, 7 seasons at Serie C)
- Ampelea (6 season at Serie C)
- Arsa (1 season at Serie C)

==== Former Professional Teams Liquidated or Excluded ====
- Pre-1948 Liquidations (23): Isotta Fraschini, Vicenzo Benini, Fortitudo Trieste, Vittorio Necchi, Armando Casalini, Alfa Romeo, VV. FF. Roma, 94º Reparto Distrettuale, Ilva Savona, VV. FF. Palermo, RST Littorio, Mario Passamonte, M.A.T.E.R., SGEM Villafranca, Mario Passamonte, Avio Squadrea, Dipendenti Municipali La Spezia, Ala Italiana, Magazzini Generali, San Giorgio Fois, Trancerie Mossina, Pietro Resta, Amatori Bologna
- Unknown Liquidation Date (11): Budrio, Redaelli, Cantieri Tosi, Aviosicula Palermo, Ardens, Galliate, Cinzano, Bondenese, Breda, Villasanta, Gerli
- Late 20th Century Liquidations (21): Arsenale Messina (1951); Acciaierie Falck (1952); Marzotto Manerbio (1957); Chinotto Neri (1957); FEDIT (1959); Rizzoli (1964); Cirio (1964); Juventina Palermo (1968); Pirelli (1968); Enzo Andreanelli (1969); Edera Trieste (1973); Massiminiana (1976); Banco di Roma (1983); Gioventu Brindisi (1985); Telgate (1989); Valdiano 85 (1990); Adelaide Nicastro (1992); Virescit Boccaleone (1993); Terranova Gela (1994); Juventina Gela (1994); Agrigento (1999)
- Modern Liquidations (33): Sangiuseppese (2008); CuoioCappiano (2009); Pro Belvedere (2010); Pescina Valle del Giovenco (2010); Cisco Roma (2011); Atletico Roma (2011); Cesenatico (2011); Rodengo Saiano (2011); Pizzighettone (2012); Castel San Pietro (2012); Citta di Jesolo (2013); Giacomense (2013); Aullese (2014); Castel Rigone (2014); Baracca Lugo (2015); Magazzini Generali (2015); Abbiategrasso (2015); HinterReggio (2015); Real Vicenza (2015); Neapolis (2015); Sebinia Alto Sebino (2016); Calcio Caravaggese (2016); Crociati Noceto (2016); Racing Roma (2017); LVPA Frascati (2019); Lupa Roma (2019); Pro Piacenza (2019); Sarzanese (2020); Pro Cisterna (2021); Delta Porto Tolle (2022); Arzanese (2022); Sparta Novara (2023); Aprilia (2023)

Baracca Lugo with 19 Serie C seasons and Virescit Boccaleone with 9 Serie C seasons are the only liquidated clubs in modern history with more than six seasons of professional football.

== See also ==
- Italian football league system
- List of football teams
