= Leslie Minter =

English-born Italian footballer (born 1890)

Leslie Walter Minter
Personal information
- Date of birth: 1890
- Position: Centre-half

Youth career
- Chelsea

Senior career*
Years	Team	Apps	(Gls)
1913–22	Internazionale Napoli		
1922–26	FBC Internaples		
1926–27	Napoli		
- * Club domestic league appearances and goals

Leslie Walter Minter (born 1890) was an English-born footballer who played as a centre-half. Although born and raised in England, he is best known for his footballing career in Italy.

During his time in Italy, he played for U.S. Internazionale Napoli, FBC Internaples and he was among the founding players of S.S.C. Napoli.

Having spent over a decade in Naples, he was given Italian citizenship and later represented a south-central Italian team versus a southeast French selection in Rome.
