= Football in Southern Italy in 1919–20 =

Football tournaments of Southern Italy

Football in Southern Italy in 1919–20 was still organized at an experimental and amatorial level.

The tournaments were organized in three regions, Tuscany, Latium and Campania. Differently from the pre-war period, six clubs advanced to a general final tournament.

== Qualifications ==
=== Tuscany ===
==== Classification ====
Pos	Team	Pld	W	D	L	GF	GA	GD	Pts	Promotion or relegation
1	Pisa	10	8	2	0	48	6	+42	18	Qualified
2	Livorno	10	7	1	2	32	10	+22	15	Qualified
3	Libertas Firenze	10	3	3	4	14	16	−2	9	
4	Gerbi Pisa	10	4	1	5	23	32	−9	9	
5	CS Firenze	10	2	3	5	11	26	−15	7	
6	Prato (T)	10	1	0	9	10	48	−38	2	Re-elected

Source: Panini
(T) Qualified, but not yet for the particular phase indicated

==== Results table ====
Home \ Away	CSF	GEP	LFI	LIV	PIS	PRA
CS Firenze		1–1	0–0	0–2	1–1	4–0
Gerbi Pisa	7–0		2–1	1–2	1–4	6–0
Libertas Firenze	3–1	0–1		0–0	1–1	6–1
Livorno	2–0	9–1	4–1		1–2	6–0
Pisa	9–0	8–2	5–0	5–0		8–0
Prato	1–4	7–1	1–2	0–6	0–5	

Updated to match(es) played on unknown. Source: Almanacco Illustrato del Calcio - La Storia 1898-2004, Panini Edizioni, Modena, September 2005 (in Italian)
Legend: Blue = home team win; Yellow = draw; Red = away team win.

=== Lazio ===
==== Classification ====
Pos	Team	Pld	W	D	L	GF	GA	GD	Pts	Promotion or relegation
1	Fortitudo Roma	12	10	1	1	41	11	+30	21	Qualified
2	Audace Roma	12	6	4	2	19	12	+7	16	Qualified
3	Lazio	12	6	2	4	22	11	+11	14	
4	Juventus Audax	12	5	2	5	17	17	0	12	
5	US Romana	12	4	2	6	17	28	−11	10	
6	Pro Roma	12	3	2	7	16	27	−11	8	
7	Roman (T)	12	1	1	10	10	36	−26	3	Re-elected

Source: Panini
(T) Qualified, but not yet for the particular phase indicated

==== Results table ====
Home \ Away	ARO	FOR	JAU	LAZ	PRO	ROM	USR
Audace Roma		3–2	1–0 (Note: The match Audace Roma-Juventus Audax was suspended at the 89th minute. The Federation decided to confirm the result obtained at that point of the match.)	0–0	2–0	4–1	0–0
Fortitudo Roma	2–1		1–1	1–0	4–1	7–0	4–2
Juventus Audax	1–1	1–3		2–1	1–0	0–2 (Note: Forfeit)	2–1
Lazio	1–2	1–2	2–0		4–1	3–1	3–0
Pro Roma	1–1	0–3	1–5	2–2		3–1	4–1
Roman	0–2	1–6	2–3	0–2 (Note: Decided by the FIGC.)	0–2		0–2
US Romana	4–2	0–6	2–1	0–3	3–1	2–2	

Updated to match(es) played on unknown. Source: Almanacco Illustrato del Calcio - La Storia 1898-2004, Panini Edizioni, Modena, September 2005 (in Italian)
Legend: Blue = home team win; Yellow = draw; Red = away team win.

=== Campania ===
==== Classification ====
Pos	Team	Pld	W	D	L	GF	GA	GD	Pts	Promotion or relegation
1	Internazionale Napoli	8	5	2	1	31	9	+22	12	Qualified
2	Puteolana	8	4	3	1	16	10	+6	11	Qualified
3	Pro Napoli	8	4	1	3	25	15	+10	9	
4	Naples	8	2	2	4	17	14	+3	6	
5	Pro Caserta (E)	8	1	0	7	6	47	−41	2	Disbanded

Source: Panini
(E) Eliminated

==== Results table ====
Home \ Away	INA	NAP	PCA	PNA	PUT
Internazionale Napoli		2–1	8–2	1–1	3–1
Naples	1–3		7–0	2–3	1–1
Pro Caserta	1–0	1–3		0–2 (Note: Forfeit)	1–4
Pro Napoli	1–6	3–1	13–0		1–3
Puteolana	1–1	1–1	3–1	2–1	

Updated to match(es) played on unknown. Source: Almanacco Illustrato del Calcio - La Storia 1898-2004, Panini Edizioni, Modena, September 2005 (in Italian)
Legend: Blue = home team win; Yellow = draw; Red = away team win.

== Semifinals ==
Two triangular semifinals were introduced.

=== Group A ===
==== Classification ====
Pos	Team	Pld	W	D	L	GF	GA	GD	Pts	Promotion or relegation
1	Fortitudo Roma	4	4	0	0	13	2	+11	8	Qualified
2	Pisa	4	1	0	3	6	8	−2	2	
3	Puteolana	4	1	0	3	3	12	−9	2	

==== Results table ====
Home \ Away	FOR	PIS	PUT
Fortitudo Roma		2–0	5–0
Pisa	1–4		5–0
Puteolana	1–2	2–0 (Note: Forfeit)	

Updated to match(es) played on unknown. Source: Almanacco Illustrato del Calcio - La Storia 1898-2004, Panini Edizioni, Modena, September 2005 (in Italian)
Legend: Blue = home team win; Yellow = draw; Red = away team win.

=== Group B ===
==== Classification ====
Pos	Team	Pld	W	D	L	GF	GA	GD	Pts	Promotion or relegation
1	Livorno	4	4	0	0	12	3	+9	8	Qualified
2	Audace Roma	4	2	0	2	7	5	+2	4	
3	Internazionale Napoli	4	0	0	4	0	11	−11	0	

==== Results table ====
Home \ Away	ARO	INA	LIV
Audace Roma		2–0 (Note: Forfeit)	3–4
Internazionale Napoli	0–2		0–3
Livorno	1–0	4–0	

Updated to match(es) played on unknown. Source: Almanacco Illustrato del Calcio - La Storia 1898-2004, Panini Edizioni, Modena, September 2005 (in Italian)
Legend: Blue = home team win; Yellow = draw; Red = away team win.

== Final round ==
Played on 13 June 1920, in Bologna.

Team 1	Score	Team 2
Livorno	3–2	Fortitudo Roma

== See also ==
- Football in Southern Italy in 1920–21
