= Luigi Barbesino =

Italian footballer and manager

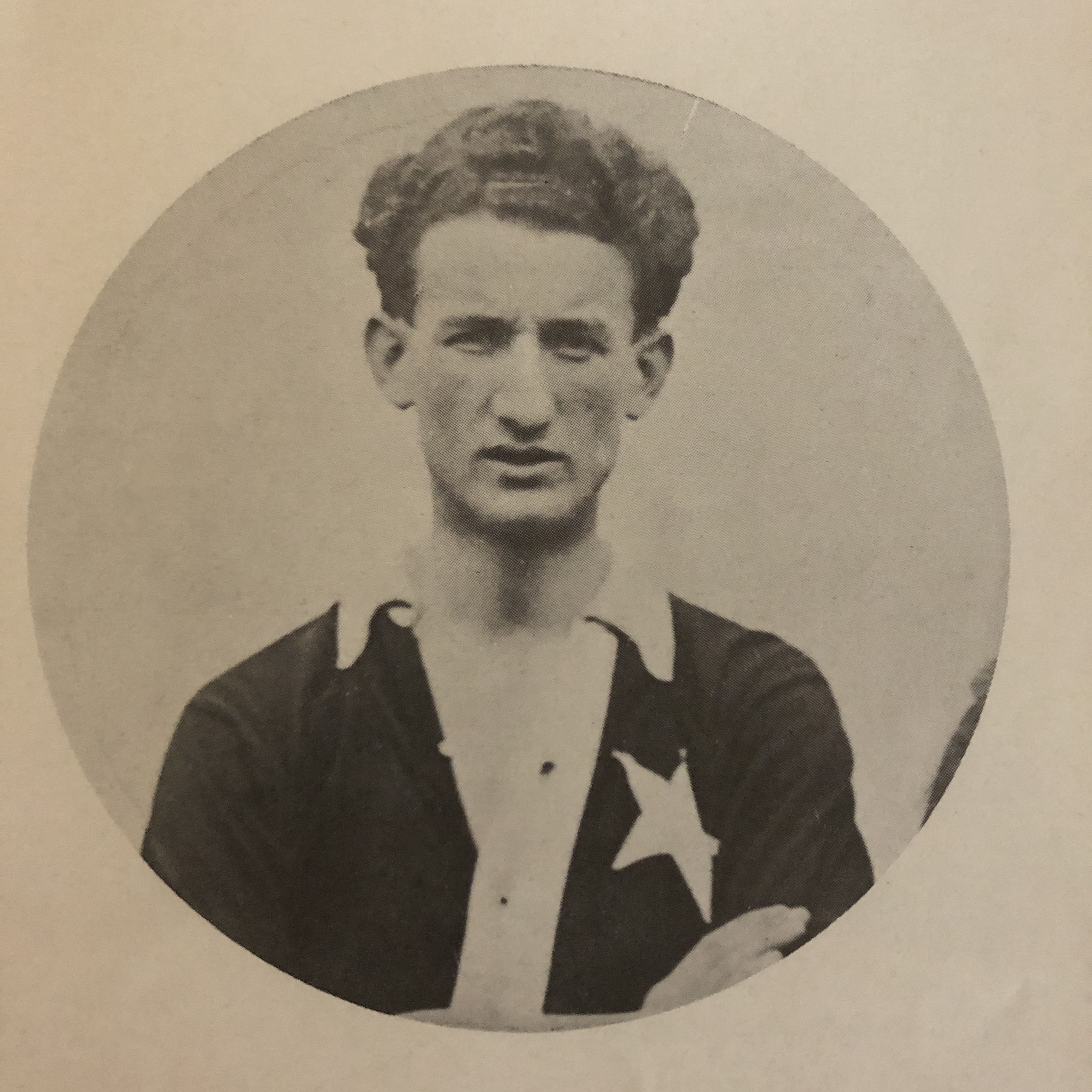

Personal information
- Date of birth: 1 May 1894
- Place of birth: Casale Monferrato, Italy
- Date of death: 20 April 1941 (aged 46)
- Place of death: Mediterranean Sea
- Position: Midfielder

Senior career*
Years	Team	Apps	(Gls)
1912–1920	Casale	83	(11)

International career
1912–1914	Italy	5	(1)

Managerial career
- 1934–1938: Roma
- * Club domestic league appearances and goals

Luigi Barbesino (Italian pronunciation: [luˈiːdʒi barbeˈziːno]; 1 May 1894 – 20 April 1941) was an Italian association footballer and manager from Casale Monferrato in the region of Piedmont. A midfielder, he was a one club man in the truest sense of the term, spending his eight playing seasons at his hometown club Casale, helping them to win their one and only Italian Football Championship title, and collecting 83 league appearances and 11 goals for the club between 1912 and 1920.

Barbesino also represented Italy at international level, and represented his country in football at the 1912 Summer Olympics. He is officially the fourth-youngest international player to ever appear for Italy, behind only Rodolfo Gavinelli, Renzo De Vecchi, and Gianluigi Donnarumma; he made his international debut on 1 July 1912, in a 1–0 away win over hosts Sweden at the Summer Olympics that year, at the age of 18 years and 2 months. In total, he collected five international appearances between 1912 and 1914, scoring once in a 1–0 friendly away win over Switzerland on 17 May 1914, which was his final international appearance. He later coached Roma between 1934 and 1938.

A convinced Fascist, Barbesino co-organized and took part in the Fascist march on Bolzano on 1–2 October, which anticipated the March on Rome.

== Disappearance ==
When World War II began, Barbesino abandoned football to serve as a major observer in the Regia Aeronautica, flying in Savoia-Marchetti SM.79 trimotors of 194ª squadriglia bombardamento terrestre (193rd bomb squadron) based with the rest of 20° Stormo (20th wing) on Sciacca airfield in Sicily. On 20 April 1941 he was an observer on an aircraft flying on the Sciacca-Kuriate-Kerkenna-Sciacca course. While his wingman turned back one-hour after take-off due to bad weather, Barbesino's aircraft was never heard of again. To this day, he and the entire crew of six are still posted as missing.

== See also ==
- List of people who disappeared mysteriously at sea

== Honours ==
Casale

- Italian Football Championship: 1913–14
