= Naples FBC =

- Full name: Naples Foot-Ball Club
- Nickname(s): I Blucelesti (The blue and sky blues)
- Founded: 1905; 120 years ago, as Naples Foot-Ball & Cricket Club
- Dissolved: 14 October 1922; 102 years ago, (due to merger with U.S. Internazionale Napoli to form FBC Internaples)
- Ground: Campo del Poligono
- 1921–22: Prima Divisione Campania, 4th
Home colours

Naples Foot-Ball Club, also known as Naples FBC or more briefly as Naples, was an Italian football club founded in Naples, Campania in 1905.

They merged with U.S. Internazionale Napoli in 1922 for financial reasons, thus giving life to "Foot-Ball Club Internazionale-Naples", better known as "FBC Internaples", and known today as "S.S.C. Napoli".

== History ==
The Naples Foot-Ball & Cricket Club was founded in late 1905 by engineer Amedeo Salsi and English sailor and amateur footballer William Poths, with the help of the Neapolitan engineer Emilio Anatra and Poths's associate Hector Bayon. Salsi was the first president of the club. Originally the club was intended to be the football section of the multi-sport Reale Club Canottieri Italia (Royal Italian Rowing Club), though it separated before playing its first match. In 1906, "Cricket" was removed from the club name, becoming simply Naples Foot-Ball Club.

The club played its matches at the Campo dei Bagnoli, in a peripheral area of the city, difficult to reach. In September 1906, Naples became the first central-southern team to join the FIF (precursor to the FIGC). Since Naples was the only southern club affiliated with the FIF, it would have to bear very large travel expenses to play in the national division, since all the teams registered in the tournaments were from Northern Italy, unless Naples were to move their headquarters north, which would have been of great disadvantage for the players, who had other jobs and played football only for fun, rather than as a profession. For this reason, Naples did not play in a FIF-affiliated competition until other teams in Campania joined the FIF. In the early years, however, they won some minor competitions including two Lipton Cups (in 1909 and 1911), both won by beating Palermo in the final. Naples quickly became the most competitive team in the city, nearly always outclassing the other Neapolitan teams, namely Audace Napoli, Elios, SS Napoli and Juventus di Napoli. In some cases the other Neapolitan teams, in order to have greater hopes of being able to beat Naples, joined their forces constituting a unified selection of their best elements; however, often this selection too had the worst of the Naples.

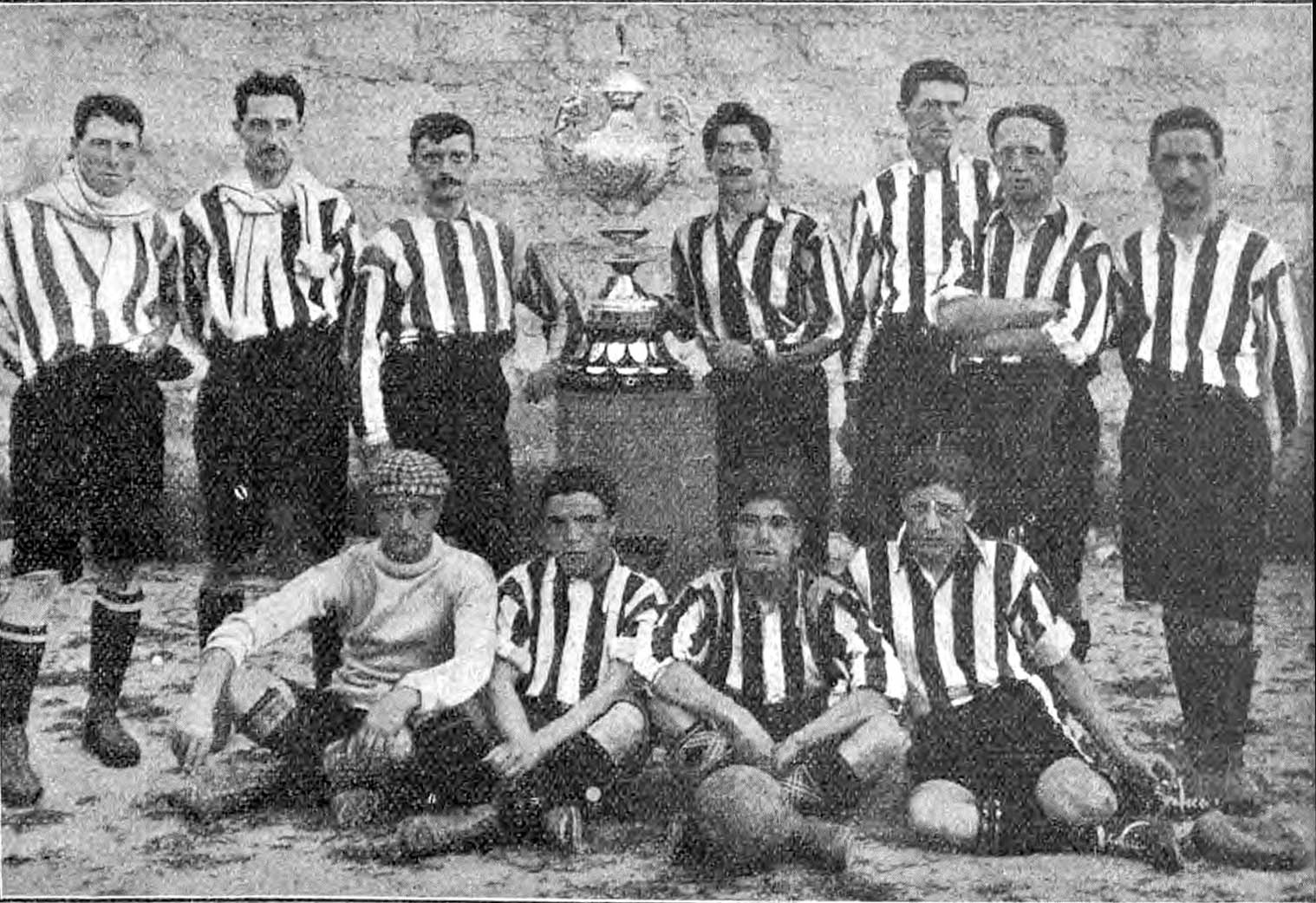
The 1909 Lipton Cup winning squad of Naples

At the beginning of 1908 Naples and SS Napoli, recently affiliated to the FIF, applied for the establishment of a Seconda Categoria (second tier) level Campania regional championship organized by the FIF to which they could register. The FIF decided to establish for the first time the Terza Categoria (third tier) Campania championship, in which Naples joined with several other Neapolitan clubs, thus making their debut in a competition organized by the FIF. Naples won this competition in the first season by defeating Audace in the final, and defeated Audace in the final again in 1909 and were promoted to the Southern division of the Seconda Categoria. In 1910, Naples won the first and only Coppa Città di Napoli and defeated Bari 8–2 on aggregate to win the Seconda Categoria Southern Championship for the first time in 1910. The next season they defeated Bari 9–2 on aggregate to win their second-straight Seconda Categoria Southern Championship in 1911.

Shortly before the beginning of the 1911–12 season, Naples and Audace were the only two remaining teams in Naples as the other teams in the city had all dissolved, but soon afterward a split took place within Naples FBC; the players of foreign nationality left the team to form a new sports club, Unione Sportiva Internazionale Napoli. The new club would be a true sporting club with sections in other athletics besides only football. The split greatly weakened Naples, who were left with only three first team players from the previous season. However, Naples was able to replace their foreign players with players from the recently dissolved Neapolitan clubs, particularly those of Juventus di Napoli. Naples were defeated by the breakaway club for the Seconda Categoria title.

In 1912 the Valvassori-Faroppa project revolutionized the Italian league system, allowing teams from southern and central Italy to compete for the Prima Categoria title for the first time. This year coincided with the team moving to a new stadium, the Campo del Poligano. Naples beat Internazionale Napoli 5–3 over two legs in the southern final and reached the national semifinal (the central-southern championship) in the first season, losing to Lazio 3–2 over two legs. They would be defeated by Internazionale Napoli in the southern final the following year. In 1915 they were again set to play Internazionale Napoli for the title of Southern Italian Champions but the competition was suspended before completion due to World War I.

After the war, Naples saw much less success in the newly restructured top flight, the Prima Divisione Lega Sud. This was in part due to more teams competing in the south, including Puteolana and Savoia.

They merged with Internazionale Napoli in 1922 to form FBC Internazionale-Naples, today known as S.S.C. Napoli. Internazionale Napoli gave to the club the famous "N" crest and the white shorts; this was coupled with the light blue featured on the Naples FBC shirts. The merged club was seen by some media and fans to be a continuation of Internazionale Napoli rather than a new club; the merged club played its games at Internazionale Napoli's Terme di Agnano rather than Naples FBC's Campo del Poligono and kept Internazionale Napoli's nickname of Gli Azzurri (The Blues) rather than I Blucelesti (The Navy Blue and Sky Blues) used by Naples. Because of this, some club members founded a new club claiming to be the successor to Naples FBC immediately after the merger, first called Speranza Naples and later taking the name Naples FBC. This club folded in 1926.

== Honours ==
- Prima Categoria Sud
  - Winners: 1912-13
- Seconda Categoria Sud
  - Winners: 1909–10, 1910–11
- Terza Categoria Campania
  - Winners: 1908, 1909
- Lipton Cup
  - Winners: 1909, 1911
- Coppa Città di Napoli
  - Winners: 1910
