= Associazione Calcio Libertas =

Libertas
- Full name: Associazione Calcio Libertas
- Founded: 1911; 114 years ago
- Dissolved: 1922; 103 years ago
- Ground: Campo via Bersaglio
- League: Prima Categoria
- 1921-22: Prima Categoria, 4th in Group D
Home colours

Associazione Calcio Libertas, also knows Racing Libertas Club since 1911 to 1919, was an Italian association football team based in Milan which competed for six seasons in the Prima Categoria, the equivalent of today's Serie A. However the club was not particularly successful and it folded in 1922.

== History ==
Founded in September 1911, from the merger between the newborn "Racing Club Italia" and the "Libertas Club", both from Milan, the Racing Libertasordì lost against the Casale the special competition announced by the FIGC to complete the Prima Categoria. He then settled for the 1911-1912 Lombard Seconda Categoria Championship, playing home games on the via Cimarosa. The following year he asked for admission to the Prima Categoria, which he obtained after playing in a play-off group against Savona, Como 1907 and Società Lambro.

In his first season in the top flight he obtained 1 point in 10 matches and was therefore relegated, but immediately rescued for the enlargement of the championship. He then again disputed Prima Categoria in 1913-14 and in 1914-15, without ever passing the first elimination round, before the suspension of the activity due to the World War I.

After the war he resumed the activity with the name of Associazione Calcio Libertas. He competed in three other top-flight championships, without obtaining any major results, before he stopped working in 1922.

== Bibliography ==
- Stefano Pozzoni (2017). Milan. I derby dimenticati. Storia e cronaca di 42 derby dal 1900 al 1922. Milan: Edizioni Bradipolibri. ISBN 978-88-99146-47-4.
