= 1912–13 Prima Categoria =

16th season of top-tier Italian football

Prima Categoria
- Season: 1912–13
- Champions: Pro Vercelli; 5th title

The 1912-13 Prima Categoria season was the sixteenth of the Italian Football Championship and the tenth since the re-brand to Prima Categoria. Champions for the fifth time in six seasons (punctuated only by their protest three season previous), were Pro Vercelli.

== Regulation ==
Football in Italy expanded its popularity during the 10’s, but the expedition of the Italian football team to the Stockholm Olympics had a disappointing very poor result. In summer 1912, minor clubs took control over the Italian Football Federation, and imposed a championship reform. New vicepresidents Mr.Valvassori and Mr.Faroppa created a new format with more clubs but more groups, regionalising the tournament.

The competition was expanded from 14 Northern Italian clubs to over 30 clubs, including Central and Southern Italian clubs to make it the most genuinely national Italian Football Championship so far. Two regional round robin tournaments took place, each initially sub-divided into three further sub-tournaments.

The old main tournament was split in two groups of six clubs, with solely ten matchdays, while the Oriental group became a full member of the championship.

Best two clubs of each group went to the final group. Last clubs should be relegated.

An experimental Southern section was introduced.

== Pre-league qualifications ==
=== For Piedmont group ===
Played on October 20, 1912, in Turin.

| Team 1 | Score | Team 2 |
|---|---|---|
| Vigor Torino | 0–4 | Novara |

Novara was promoted.

=== For Lombardy-Liguria group ===
==== Round 1 ====
Played on October 20, 1912.

| Team 1 | Score | Team 2 |
|---|---|---|
| Savona | 3–1 | Como |
| Lambro Milano | 2–1 | Racing Libertas Milano |

The match between Lambro Milano and Racing Libertas Milano was later canceled and repeated:

Repetition
Played on October 27, 1912.

| Team 1 | Score | Team 2 |
|---|---|---|
| Racing Libertas Milano | 1–0 (after extra time) | Lambro Milano |

==== Round 2 ====
Played on November 1, 1912.

| Team 1 | Score | Team 2 |
|---|---|---|
| Racing Libertas Milano | 1–0 | Savona |

Racing Libertas was promoted.

=== For Latium group ===
==== Round 1 ====
Played on October 20, 1912.

| Team 1 | Score | Team 2 |
|---|---|---|
| Alba Roma | 1–2 | Juventus Audax Roma |
| Pro Roma | 2–1 | Tebro Roma |

==== Round 2 ====
Played on October 27, 1912.

| Team 1 | Score | Team 2 |
|---|---|---|
| Alba Roma | 2–0 | Tebro Roma |

=== Verdicts ===
Novara, Racing Libertas Milan, Alba Roma, Juventus Audax Roma and Pro Roma were admitted to the 1a Categoria. The losers went to regional 2nd Category Promotion.

== Main tournament ==
=== Piedmont ===
==== Classification ====
| Pos | Team | Pld | W | D | L | GF | GA | GD | Pts | Qualification |
|---|---|---|---|---|---|---|---|---|---|---|
| 1 | Pro Vercelli | 10 | 9 | 1 | 0 | 38 | 2 | +36 | 19 | Qualified for Final Round |
| 2 | Casale | 10 | 5 | 3 | 2 | 15 | 8 | +7 | 13 | Qualified for Final Round |
| 3 | Torino | 10 | 5 | 1 | 4 | 35 | 21 | +14 | 11 | |
| 4 | Piemonte | 10 | 5 | 0 | 5 | 16 | 37 | −21 | 10 | |
| 5 | Novara | 10 | 1 | 2 | 7 | 13 | 28 | −15 | 4 | |
| 6 | Juventus (T) | 10 | 1 | 1 | 8 | 14 | 35 | −21 | 3 | Re-elected |

Source: Panini
(T) Qualified, but not yet for the particular phase indicated

==== Results table ====
| Home \ Away | CSL | JUV | NOV | PIE | PVE | TOR |
|---|---|---|---|---|---|---|
| Casale | | 3–0 | 2–1 | 5–2 | 0–0 | 1–1 |
| Juventus | 0–1 | | 3–0 | 1–2 | 0–4 | 6–8 |
| Novara | 0–0 | 3–3 | | 7–1 | 0–6 | 1–2 |
| Piemonte | 3–1 | 3–1 | 1–0 | | 1–7 | 2–1 |
| Pro Vercelli | 1–0 | 3–0 | 7–0 | 3–0 | | 6–1 |
| Torino | 0–2 | 8–0 | 3–1 | 11–1 | 0–1 | |

Updated to match(es) played on unknown. Source: Almanacco Illustrato del Calcio – La Storia 1898–2004, Panini Edizioni, Modena, September 2005 (in Italian)
Legend: Blue = home team win; Yellow = draw; Red = away team win.

=== Liguria-Lombardy ===
==== Classification ====
| Pos | Team | Pld | W | D | L | GF | GA | GD | Pts | Qualification |
|---|---|---|---|---|---|---|---|---|---|---|
| 1 | Milan | 10 | 9 | 0 | 1 | 30 | 8 | +22 | 18 | Qualified for Final Group |
| 2 | Genoa | 10 | 8 | 0 | 2 | 33 | 12 | +21 | 16 | Qualified for Final Group |
| 3 | Internazionale | 10 | 6 | 0 | 4 | 24 | 14 | +10 | 12 | |
| 4 | Andrea Doria | 10 | 4 | 1 | 5 | 20 | 30 | −10 | 9 | |
| 5 | US Milanese | 10 | 1 | 2 | 7 | 8 | 25 | −17 | 4 | |
| 6 | Racing Libertas Milan (T) | 10 | 0 | 1 | 9 | 8 | 34 | −26 | 1 | Re-elected |

Source: Panini
(T) Qualified, but not yet for the particular phase indicated

==== Results table ====
| Home \ Away | ADO | GEN | INT | MIL | RAC | USM |
|---|---|---|---|---|---|---|
| Andrea Doria | | 1–5 | 6–0 | 2–3 | 3–2 | 1–1 |
| Genoa | 6–0 | | 0–1 | 4–1 | 5–1 | 4–0 |
| Internazionale | 5–1 | 2–3 | | 1–2 | 5–0 | 2–0 |
| Milan | 7–0 | 4–0 | 1–0 | | 2–0 | 6–0 |
| Racing Libertas Milano | 1–5 | 0–1 | 1–6 | 1–2 | | 2–2 |
| US Milanese | 0–1 | 2–5 | 0–2 | 0–2 | 3–0 | |

Updated to match(es) played on unknown. Source: Almanacco Illustrato del Calcio – La Storia 1898–2004, Panini Edizioni, Modena, September 2005 (in Italian)
Legend: Blue = home team win; Yellow = draw; Red = away team win.

=== Veneto-Emilia ===
==== Classification ====
| Pos | Team | Pld | W | D | L | GF | GA | GD | Pts | Qualification |
|---|---|---|---|---|---|---|---|---|---|---|
| 1 | Vicenza | 10 | 7 | 2 | 1 | 32 | 10 | +22 | 16 | Qualified for Final Group |
| 1 | Hellas Verona | 10 | 8 | 0 | 2 | 28 | 10 | +18 | 16 | Qualified for Final Group |
| 3 | Venezia | 10 | 6 | 2 | 2 | 28 | 6 | +22 | 14 | |
| 4 | Volontari Venezia | 10 | 3 | 2 | 5 | 19 | 29 | −10 | 8 | |
| 5 | Bologna | 10 | 2 | 0 | 8 | 14 | 30 | −16 | 4 | |
| 6 | Modena (T) | 10 | 1 | 0 | 9 | 6 | 42 | −36 | 2 | Re-elected |

Source: Panini
(T) Qualified, but not yet for the particular phase indicated

==== Results table ====
| Home \ Away | BOL | HEL | MOD | VEN | VIC | VOL |
|---|---|---|---|---|---|---|
| Bologna | | 1–2 | 1–0 | 0–1 | 2–4 | 9–0 |
| Hellas Verona | 3–0 | | 8–0 | 2–0 | 4–1 | 3–2 |
| Modena | 1–0 | 1–4 | | 0–2 | 0–4 | 0–5 |
| Venezia | 8–0 | 3–0 | 8–2 | | 0–1 | 5–0 |
| Vicenza | 7–0 | 1–0 | 7–1 | 0–0 | | 6–2 |
| Volontari Venezia | 4–1 | 1–2 | 3–1 | 1–1 | 1–1 | |

Updated to match(es) played on unknown. Source: Almanacco Illustrato del Calcio – La Storia 1898–2004, Panini Edizioni, Modena, September 2005 (in Italian)
Legend: Blue = home team win; Yellow = draw; Red = away team win.

=== Final round ===
The results of the matches between sides that were in the same qualification rounds were valid also for the final round (but not the goals scored in those matches). Due to this, the sides began the final round with a point bonus:

- Pro Vercelli: 3 points
- Milan, Genoa, Hellas Verona, Vicenza: 2 points
- Casale: 1 point

==== Classification ====
| Pos | Team | Pld | W | D | L | GF | GA | GD | Pts | Qualification |
|---|---|---|---|---|---|---|---|---|---|---|
| 1 | Pro Vercelli (C) | 10 | 8 | 2 | 0 | 22 | 1 | +21 | 18 | Champions and qualified |
| 2 | Genoa | 10 | 6 | 1 | 3 | 21 | 13 | +8 | 13 | |
| 3 | Milan | 10 | 5 | 2 | 3 | 21 | 10 | +11 | 12 | |
| 4 | Casale | 10 | 4 | 3 | 3 | 22 | 13 | +9 | 11 | |
| 5 | Vicenza | 10 | 1 | 2 | 7 | 8 | 25 | −17 | 4 | |
| 6 | Hellas Verona | 10 | 1 | 0 | 9 | 7 | 39 | −32 | 2 | |

Source: Panini
(C) Champions

Note:solely 8 matches really played instead of 10.

==== Results table ====
| Home \ Away | CSL | GEN | HEL | MIL | PVE | VIC |
|---|---|---|---|---|---|---|
| Casale | | 1–1 | 6–0 | 2–0 | 0–0 | 5–1 |
| Genoa | 1–0 | | 5–0 | 4–1 | 0–1 | 1–0 |
| Hellas Verona | 2–5 | 0–4 | | 0–3 | 0–5 | 4–1 |
| Milan | 4–0 | 4–0 | 5–1 | | 0–0 | 1–1 |
| Pro Vercelli | 1–0 | 5–1 | 4–0 | 2–0 | | 3–0 |
| Vicenza | 3–3 | 1–4 | 1–0 | 0–3 | 0–1 | |

Updated to match(es) played on unknown. Source: Almanacco Illustrato del Calcio – La Storia 1898–2004, Panini Edizioni, Modena, September 2005 (in Italian)
Legend: Blue = home team win; Yellow = draw; Red = away team win.

Pro Vercelli advanced to National Final.

== Central-Southern Italy tournament ==
=== Tuscany ===
| Pos | Team | Pld | W | D | L | GF | GA | GD | Pts | Qualification |
|---|---|---|---|---|---|---|---|---|---|---|
| 1 | Virtus Juventusque (C) | 6 | 4 | 1 | 1 | 11 | 8 | +3 | 9 | Champions and qualified |
| 2 | SPES Livorno | 6 | 2 | 3 | 1 | 15 | 9 | +6 | 7 | |
| 3 | Pisa | 6 | 1 | 2 | 3 | 6 | 6 | 0 | 4 | |
| 4 | Firenze | 6 | 2 | 0 | 4 | 7 | 16 | −9 | 4 | |

Source: Panini
(C) Champions

| Home \ Away | CSF | PIS | SLI | VJU |
|---|---|---|---|---|
| Firenze | | 1–4 | 2–1 | 0–1 |
| Pisa | 0–1 | | 1–1 | 0–1 |
| SPES Livorno | 6–1 | 1–1 | | 1–1 |
| Virtus Juventusque | 4–2 | 1–0 | 3–5 | |

Updated to match(es) played on unknown. Source: Almanacco Illustrato del Calcio – La Storia 1898–2004, Panini Edizioni, Modena, September 2005 (in Italian)
Legend: Blue = home team win; Yellow = draw; Red = away team win.

Virtus Juventusque advanced to Central Final.

=== Lazio ===
| Pos | Team | Pld | W | D | L | GF | GA | GD | Pts | Qualification |
|---|---|---|---|---|---|---|---|---|---|---|
| 1 | Lazio | 10 | 8 | 2 | 0 | 55 | 9 | +46 | 18 | Champions and qualified |
| 2 | Juventus Roma | 10 | 6 | 2 | 2 | 25 | 21 | +4 | 14 | |
| 3 | Audace Roma | 10 | 6 | 1 | 3 | 27 | 22 | +5 | 13 | |
| 4 | Roman | 10 | 5 | 1 | 4 | 26 | 15 | +11 | 11 | |
| 5 | Pro Roma | 10 | 2 | 0 | 8 | 9 | 55 | −46 | 4 | |
| 6 | Alba Roma | 10 | 0 | 0 | 10 | 0 | 20 | −20 | 0 | |

Source: Panini

| Home \ Away | ALB | AUE | AUJ | LAZ | PRO | ROM |
|---|---|---|---|---|---|---|
| Alba Roma | | 0–2 | 0–2 | 0–2 | 0–2 | 0–2 |
| Audace Roma | 2–0 | | 3–3 | 2–6 | 9–1 | 2–1 |
| Juventus Roma | 2–0 | 5–1 | | 2–2 | 1–0 | 0–3 |
| Lazio | 2–0 | 5–0 | 9–2 | | 13–1 | 5–0 |
| Pro Roma | 2–0 | 1–4 | 1–5 | 0–9 | | 1–9 |
| Roman | 2–0 | 0–2 | 2–3 | 2–2 | 5–0 | |

Updated to match(es) played on unknown. Source: Almanacco Illustrato del Calcio – La Storia 1898–2004, Panini Edizioni, Modena, September 2005 (in Italian)
Legend: Blue = home team win; Yellow = draw; Red = away team win.

Lazio advanced to Central Final.

=== Campania (Southern Final) ===
==== First leg ====
| Team 1 | Score | Team 2 |
|---|---|---|
| Naples | 2–1 | Internazionale Napoli |

==== Second leg ====
| Team 1 | Score | Team 2 |
|---|---|---|
| Internazionale Napoli | 2–3 | Naples |

Naples won 5–3 on aggregate, advanced to Central-Southern Final.

=== Central Final ===
==== First leg ====
| Team 1 | Score | Team 2 |
|---|---|---|
| Virtus Juventusque | 1–3 | Lazio |

==== Second leg ====
| Team 1 | Score | Team 2 |
|---|---|---|
| Lazio | 3–0 | Virtus Juventusque |

Lazio won 6–1 on aggregate, advanced to Central-Southern Final.

=== Central-Southern Final ===
==== First leg ====
| Team 1 | Score | Team 2 |
|---|---|---|
| Naples | 1–2 | Lazio |

==== Second leg ====
| Team 1 | Score | Team 2 |
|---|---|---|
| Lazio | 1–1 | Naples |

Lazio won 3–2 on aggregate, advanced to the National Final.

== National final ==
Played on 1 June 1913, in Genoa.

| Team 1 | Score | Team 2 |
|---|---|---|
| Pro Vercelli | 6–0 | Lazio |
