= 1913–14 Prima Categoria =

17th season of top-tier Italian football

Prima Categoria
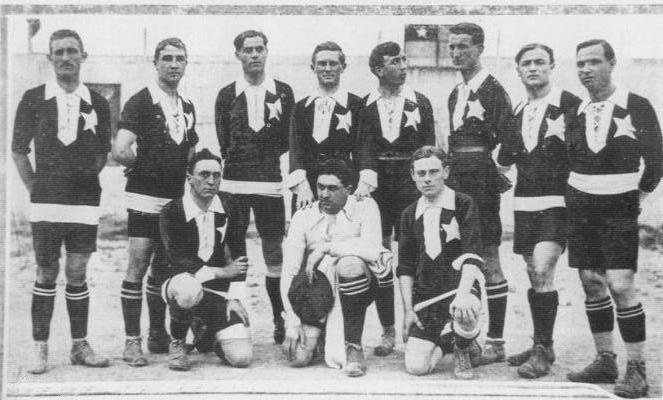
- The victorious Casale: Gallina (goalkeeper, holding his flat cap), Maggiani, Scrivano, Rosa, Luigi Barbesino, Giuseppe Parodi, Caira, Angelo Mattea, Giovanni Gallina, Amedeo Varese, Bertinotti.
- Season: 1913–14
- Champions: Casale; 1st title
- Top goalscorer: Luigi Cevenini (37)

The 1913-14 Prima Categoria was the seventeenth edition of the Italian Football Championship and the eleventh since the re-brand to Prima Categoria. The 1913–14 Prima Categoria title is the only Italian Football Championship won by Casale. The previous six season dominance of Pro Vercelli of five titles only punctuated in a season in which they fielded a protest team, ended that season.

== Regulation ==
The competition was expanded to 44 clubs. Structure involving Central and Southern Italian clubs introduced the season before was retained. Two regional round robin tournaments again took place, each initially sub-divided into three further sub-tournaments. The Northern championship, which was the main tournament, was split in three groups of ten clubs, with eighteen matchdays, even if the Oriental group could not be filled.

The best two clubs of each group went to the final group. Last clubs should be relegated.

The experimental Southern groups had their own special regulations.

== Teams ==
US Alessandria for Piedmont, Liguria for Ligury, Nazionale Lombardia for Lombardy, and Petrarca Padua had been promoted according to the national regulation. However, Lombard local committee also promoted Juve Italia and AC Milanese Lambro, while Venetian local committee also promoted Udinese.

Following Baraldi-Baruffini agreement, three relegated clubs were re-elected, while Vigor Turin and Savona Calcio were also promoted. Finally, Como and Brescia FC were also invited to join.

== Main tournament ==
=== Piedmont-Liguria ===
==== Classification ====
Pos	Team	Pld	W	D	L	GF	GA	GD	Pts	Qualification
1	Casale	18	15	1	2	65	11	+54	31	Qualified for Final Round
1	Genoa	18	14	3	1	49	19	+30	31	Qualified for Final Round
3	Pro Vercelli	18	13	4	1	58	8	+50	30	
4	Torino	18	12	2	4	74	21	+53	26	
5	Alessandria	18	8	3	7	41	25	+16	19	
6	Andrea Doria	18	6	2	10	24	48	−24	14	
7	Piemonte	18	4	2	12	24	64	−40	10	
8	Savona	18	3	3	12	27	57	−30	9	
9	Vigor Turin	18	3	2	13	28	55	−27	8	
10	Liguria (T)	18	0	2	16	11	93	−82	2	Re-elected

Source: Panini
(T) Qualified, but not yet for the particular phase indicated

==== Results table ====
Home \ Away	ALE	ADO	CSL	GEN	LIG	PIE	PVE	SVN	TOR	VTO
Alessandria		4–0	1–3	1–3	7–0	3–0	1–1	4–1	1–2	0–0
Andrea Doria	2–2		0–1	3–5	2–1	4–1	0–1	2–0	0–6	1–0
Casale	1–0	7–1		2–0	8–0	4–0	0–0	4–0	4–0	4–1
Genoa	3–0	1–0	5–2		1–0	4–1	1–0	3–1	3–3	4–1
Liguria	0–5	2–4	0–6	0–4		3–3	0–6	1–4	0–7	1–1
Piemonte	0–3	3–0	0–9	2–7	4–1		0–2	2–2	0–11	2–1
Pro Vercelli	2–0	4–2	2–0	0–0	11–0	2–0		6–0	2–0	8–0
Savona	0–3	0–0	0–3	1–1	7–1	2–4	1–5		0–4	6–2
Torino	4–2	9–1	1–2	1–2	6–0	4–1	2–2	6–0		2–1
Vigor Torino	3–4	1–2	0–5	1–2	7–1	2–1	1–4	6–2	0–6	

Updated to match(es) played on unknown. Source: Almanacco Illustrato del Calcio - La Storia 1898-2004, Panini Edizioni, Modena, September 2005 (in Italian)
Legend: Blue = home team win; Yellow = draw; Red = away team win.

=== Lombardy ===
==== Classification ====
Pos	Team	Pld	W	D	L	GF	GA	GD	Pts	Qualification
1	Internazionale	18	15	1	2	91	25	+66	31	Qualified for Final Round
2	Juventus	18	13	2	3	67	24	+43	28	Qualified for Final Round
3	Milan	18	11	4	3	58	19	+39	26	
4	US Milanese	18	8	5	5	32	23	+9	21	
5	Novara	18	9	1	8	43	32	+11	19	
6	Nazionale Lombardia	18	8	2	8	45	53	−8	18	
7	Racing Libertas Milan	18	6	2	10	26	58	−32	14	
8	Juventus Italia	18	4	3	11	14	48	−34	11	
9	Como	18	2	3	13	17	58	−41	7	
10	AC Milanese (T)	18	1	3	14	23	76	−53	5	Re-elected

Source: Panini
(T) Qualified, but not yet for the particular phase indicated

==== Results table ====
Home \ Away	ACM	COM	INT	JUV	JIT	MIL	NLO	NOV	RAC	USM
AC Milanese		8–3	1–1	1–1	1–1	1–6	3–5	0–3	0–2	0–8
Como	2–1		1–5	1–3	1–0	0–4	2–3	0–3	1–1	0–2
Internazionale	15–0	5–1		6–1	5–0	5–2	9–1	1–3	5–2	3–1
Juventus	6–1	9–0	7–2		6–0	2–1	5–0	1–3	3–1	4–0
Juventus Italia	2–0	1–1	0–4	1–2		0–6	1–4	2–1	2–0	1–0
Milan	6–1	4–0	0–1	3–1	3–1		2–2	2–0	1–1	1–1
Nazionale Lombardia	6–2	3–1	0–8	2–3	1–1	1–5		2–0	3–1	2–3
Novara	5–2	3–1	2–3	2–8	5–0	0–4	3–0		7–0	1–1
Racing Libertas Milano	2–1	3–2	3–8	0–5	2–0	1–7	2–9	2–1		2–1
US Milanese	1–0	0–0	0–5	0–0	6–1	1–1	2–1	3–1	2–0	

Updated to match(es) played on unknown. Source: Almanacco Illustrato del Calcio - La Storia 1898-2004, Panini Edizioni, Modena, September 2005 (in Italian)
Legend: Blue = home team win; Yellow = draw; Red = away team win.

=== Veneto-Emilia ===
==== Classification ====
Pos	Team	Pld	W	D	L	GF	GA	GD	Pts	Qualification
1	Vicenza	16	12	3	1	59	6	+53	27	Qualified for Final Group
1	Hellas Verona	16	13	1	2	52	18	+34	27	Qualified for Final Group
3	Modena	16	9	1	6	28	36	−8	19	
4	Venezia	16	7	4	5	44	19	+25	18	
5	Bologna	16	6	4	6	29	35	−6	16	
6	Brescia	16	6	2	8	33	40	−7	14	
7	Petrarca Padua	16	5	3	8	27	39	−12	13	
8	Volontari Venice (E)	16	3	0	13	19	66	−47	6	Disbanded
9	Udinese	16	1	2	13	21	53	−32	4	

Source: Panini
(E) Eliminated

==== Results table ====
Home \ Away	BOL	BRE	HEL	MOD	PET	UDI	VEN	VIC	VOL
Bologna		1–1	3–1	1–1	3–0	3–1	2–0	0–2	3–0
Brescia	3–1		2–5	3–4	0–0	2–1	5–1	0–4	7–0
Hellas Verona	8–2	4–0		3–0	3–1	3–1	1–1	3–1	10–0
Modena	2–0	4–2	1–2		2–1	5–1	2–0	0–4	2–0
Petrarca Padova	2–2	1–2	2–4	2–0		6–3	4–3	0–4	4–1
Udinese	2–2	5–1	0–2	1–2	0–2		0–7	1–1	4–5
Venezia	4–1	2–0	0–1	10–0	1–1	5–0		1–1	2–0
Vicenza	4–1	2–0	0–1	10–0	1–1	5–0	1–1		2–0
Volontari Venezia	2–5	1–5	0–2	2–3	6–1	2–1	0–6	0–5	

Updated to match(es) played on unknown. Source: Almanacco Illustrato del Calcio - La Storia 1898-2004, Panini Edizioni, Modena, September 2005 (in Italian)
Legend: Blue = home team win; Yellow = draw; Red = away team win.

=== Final round ===
==== Classification ====
Pos	Team	Pld	W	D	L	GF	GA	GD	Pts	Qualification
1	Casale (C)	10	8	0	2	15	6	+9	16	Champions and qualified
2	Genoa	10	6	2	2	22	11	+11	14	
3	Internazionale	10	4	3	3	22	16	+6	11	
4	Juventus	10	4	2	4	18	18	0	10	
5	Vicenza	10	4	1	5	15	19	−4	9	
6	Hellas Verona	10	0	0	10	6	28	−22	0	

Source: Panini
(C) Champions

==== Results table ====
Home \ Away	CSL	GEN	HEL	INT	JUV	VIC
Casale		2–0	2–0	1–0	2–0	2–0
Genoa	1–2		3–0	1–1	4–1	2–0
Hellas Verona	1–2	1–2		1–2	1–4	0–2
Internazionale	1–2	2–2	5–1		2–2	4–1
Juventus	1–0	2–4	4–1	1–0		2–2
Vicenza	2–0	0–3	2–0	4–5	2–1	

Updated to match(es) played on unknown. Source: Almanacco Illustrato del Calcio - La Storia 1898-2004, Panini Edizioni, Modena, September 2005 (in Italian)
Legend: Blue = home team win; Yellow = draw; Red = away team win.

== Central-Southern Italy tournament ==
=== Tuscany ===
Pos	Team	Pld	W	D	L	GF	GA	GD	Pts	Qualification
1	SPES Livorno (C)	14	12	2	0	46	15	+31	26	Champions and qualified
2	Firenze	14	9	2	3	36	17	+19	20	
3	Virtus Juventusque	14	9	1	4	30	14	+16	19	
4	Libertas Firenze	14	7	2	5	21	16	+5	16	
5	Itala Firenze	14	6	1	7	25	28	−3	13	
6	Pisa	14	3	2	9	14	19	−5	8	
7	Lucca	14	2	1	11	13	46	−33	5	
8	Prato	14	2	1	11	9	39	−30	5	

Source: Panini
(C) Champions

Home \ Away	CSF	ITA	LIB	LUC	PIS	PRA	SLI	VJU
Firenze		3–1	1–2	5–1	1–1	3–0	1–1	2–0
Itala Firenze	1–3		1–2	2–0	1–0	2–0	1–1	1–5
Libertas Firenze	0–2	3–2		5–1	1–1	2–0	1–3	0–1
Lucca	3–6	2–7	1–4		0–2	2–3	0–4	1–4
Pisa	0–1	0–1	0–1	0–1		5–0	1–3	2–1
Prato	0–4	1–3	0–0	0–1	3–1		1–2	0–3
SPES Livorno	5–3	3–2	3–1	5–1	0–2	2–3		1–4
Virtus Juventusque	2–1	5–0	1–0	0–0	4–1	2–0	1–3	

Updated to match(es) played on unknown. Source: Almanacco Illustrato del Calcio – La Storia 1898–2004, Panini Edizioni, Modena, September 2005 (in Italian)
Legend: Blue = home team win; Yellow = draw; Red = away team win.

SPES Livorno advanced to Central Final.

=== Lazio ===
Pos	Team	Pld	W	D	L	GF	GA	GD	Pts	Qualification
1	Lazio	10	10	0	0	52	5	+47	20	Champions and qualified
2	Roman	10	7	1	2	26	9	+17	15	
3	Juventus Roma	10	4	1	5	12	21	−9	9	
4	Fortitudo	10	2	2	6	13	35	−22	6	
5	Audace Roma	10	3	0	7	9	29	−20	6	
6	Pro Roma	10	2	0	8	19	32	−13	4	

Source: Panini

Home \ Away	AUE	AUJ	FOR	LAZ	PRO	ROM
Audace Roma		3–2	2–0	0–4	1–0	0–1
Juventus Roma	2–0		1–0	1–6	1–0	0–4
Fortitudo	4–2	2–2		0–7	5–4	1–1
Lazio	3–0	2–0	9–0		9–0	3–1
Pro Roma	10–1	1–2	2–1	1–6		0–2
Roman	3–0	3–1	5–0	2–3	4–1	

Updated to match(es) played on unknown. Source: Almanacco Illustrato del Calcio – La Storia 1898–2004, Panini Edizioni, Modena, September 2005 (in Italian)
Legend: Blue = home team win; Yellow = draw; Red = away team win.

Lazio advanced to Central Final.

=== Campania (Southern Final) ===
==== First leg ====
Team 1	Score	Team 2
Naples	1–1	Internazionale Napoli

==== Second leg ====
Team 1	Score	Team 2
Internazionale Napoli	2–1	Naples

Internazionale Napoli won 3–2 on aggregate, advanced to Central-Southern Final.

=== Central Final ===
==== First leg ====
Team 1	Score	Team 2
SPES Livorno	0–3	Lazio

==== Second leg ====
Team 1	Score	Team 2
Lazio	1–0	SPES Livorno

Lazio won 4–0 on aggregate, advanced to Central-Southern Final.

=== Central-Southern Final ===
==== First leg ====
Team 1	Score	Team 2
Lazio	1–0	Internazionale Napoli

==== Second leg ====
Team 1	Score	Team 2
Internazionale Napoli	0–8	Lazio

Lazio won 9–0 on aggregate, advanced to the National Final.

== National Finals ==
Played on 5 and 12 July 1914.

Team 1	Agg.	Team 2	1st leg	2nd leg
Casale	9–1	Lazio	7–1	2–0
