= Lipton Challenge Cup =

- The trophy awarded to champions
- Founded: 1909
- Abolished: 1915; 111 years ago
- Region: Southern Italy
- Teams: 8
- Related competitions: Coronation Cup
- Last champions: Palermo (1915)
- Most championships: Palermo (5 titles)

The Lipton Challenge Cup (also known as Southern Italy Championship) was a football competition competed between clubs from Southern Italy and Sicily. It was played during the period leading up to World War I when football in the country was still in its infancy.

== History ==
The competition was organised by Sir Thomas Lipton of the world famous Lipton Tea brand. In the final most commonly were Palermo and Naples FBC, however, Internazionale Napoli and Messina (also known as SG Garibaldi Messina) competed in the competition at various points too.

== Winners ==
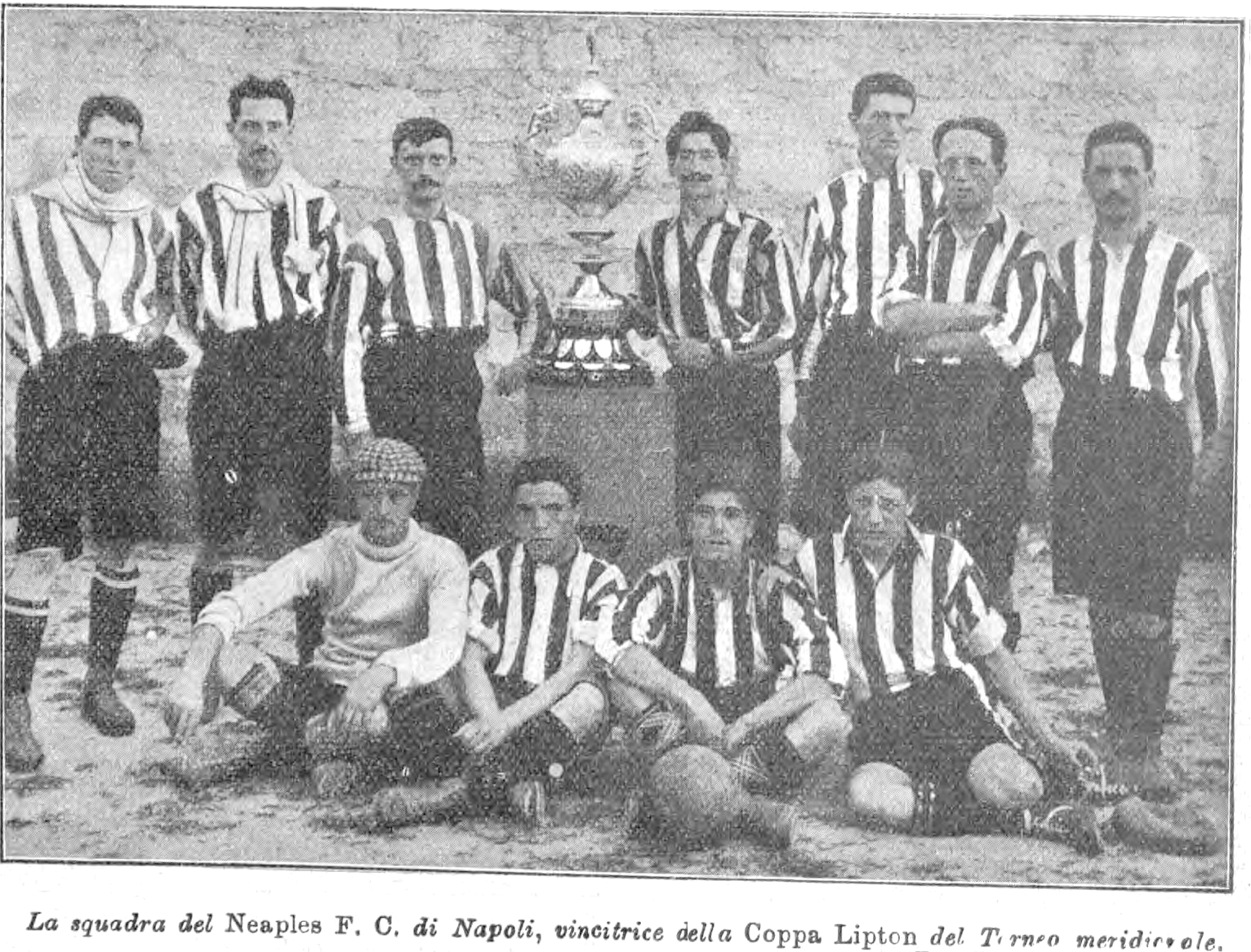
Team of Naples FBC, 1909 winning side

Year	Winner	Score	Runner-up
1909	Naples	4–2	Palermo
1910	Palermo	4–1	Naples
1911	Naples	2–1	Palermo
1912	Palermo	6–0	Naples
1913	Palermo	5–0	Internazionale Napoli
1914	Palermo	2–1	Naples
1915	Palermo	2–1	Naples
