= US Internazionale Napoli =

Italian association football club

Internazionale Napoli
- Full name: Unione Sportiva Internazionale Napoli
- Nickname(s): Gli Azzurri (The Blues)
- Founded: 11 October 1911; 113 years ago
- Dissolved: 14 October 1922; 102 years ago (due to merger with Naples FBC to form FBC Internaples)
- Ground: Terme di Agnano
- Capacity: unknown
- 1921-22: Prima Divisione CCI - Campania, 3rd
Home colours

Unione Sportiva Internazionale Napoli was an Italian football club from Naples. They were founded on 11 October 1911 after a split with Naples Foot-Ball Club. They competed until their merger with that same team in 1922 to form FBC Internazionale-Naples, better known as "FBC Internaples" and today known as Napoli.

== History ==
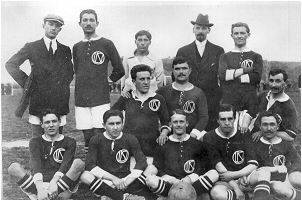
Team of Internazionale Napoli of 1912

The club split off from Naples FBC in 1911, when the foreign contingent of the club had a falling out with their Italian teammates. Mr. Bayon (an English founding member of Naples FBC) and Mr. Steinnegger thus decided to splinter off from that club to found US Internazionale Napoli. The new team adopted a dark blue shirt with a white patch, inspired, like the current Napoli kit, by the colors of the Gulf of Naples.

They first played their home games at Campo dei Bagnoli in Naples, which they shared with Naples FBC. Soon after it was founded, Internazionale Napoli signed a contract for a new, spacious football field called Terme di Agnano. Their debut on the new field came against Roman FC (one of the clubs that merged to form what is now Roma) from Rome on 27 October 1911. Internazionale Napoli won the match 3–2. During their first season, they defeated Naples to win the Seconda Categoria Southern Division title.

=== Prima Categoria Championship ===
The club competed in the top level footballing competition; the Prima Categoria Championship for the first time in 1912–13. Within the Campania section, they competed against Naples FBC over two legs; they lost 5–3 going out of the competition. The same season in the Lipton Challenge Cup they finished runners-up to Palermo.

During the following season they fared better in the Italian Championship, beating Naples 3–2 to qualify for the second round. However, they met a strong Lazio side and were knocked out of the competition with ease.

Internazionale faced off against their local rivals once more in their third Prima Categoria season, but after defeating them over two legs, FIGC ordered that the games be replayed due to irregularities. They competed in the first leg, winning 3–0 but before the second one could be played the competition was called off because of World War I.

=== Post–war activity ===
Unlike many clubs, Internazionale Napoli survived the war. They were placed into the Italian Championship of 1919–20. The Campania group now had five teams competing in it; Internazionale came top of their group beating out Puteolana by a single point. In the semi-finals, they competed against Audace Roma and eventual finalists Livorno. They failed to gain a single point and went out of the competition.

In 1920–21, they lost they reached the final round of the growing Campania section, but lost out to Naples FBC and Bagnolese. As the Italian Championship split into FIGC and CCI leagues, Internazionale competed in the CCI variation, however, they lost out on qualification to Puteolana and Savoia this would prove to be their last season in the league.

=== Mergers ===
In 1921, Internazionale Napoli absorbed a minor Neapolitan club called Pro Napoli. During 1922 the main two rival Neapolitan clubs; Naples FBC and US Internazionale Napoli merged into one due to financial pressures. They first took the name Foot-Ball Club Internazionale-Naples, commonly referred to as FBC Internaples. Internazionale Napoli gave to the club the famous "N" crest and the white shorts; this was coupled with the light blue featured on the Naples FBC shirts. The merged club was seen by media and fans to be a continuation of Internazionale Napoli rather than a new club; the merged club played its games at the Terme di Agnano rather than Naples FBC's Campo del Poligono and kept Internazionale Napoli's nickname of Gli Azzurri (The Blues) rather than I Blucelesti (The Navy Blue and Sky Blues) used by Naples.

This club would become AC Napoli in 1926 and eventually Napoli, the current club.

== Honours ==
Prima Categoria Sud

- Winners: 1913–14

Seconda Categoria Sud

- Winners: 1911–12

Lipton Challenge Cup

- Runners-up: 1913
