= Guido Ara =

Italian footballer and manager

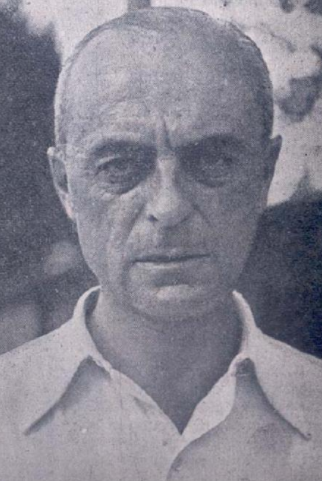

Personal information
- Date of birth: 28 August 1888
- Place of birth: Vercelli, Italy
- Date of death: 22 March 1975 (aged 86)
- Place of death: Florence, Italy
- Height: 1.82 m (5 ft 11 1/2 in)
- Position: Midfielder

Senior career*
Years	Team	Apps	(Gls)
1908–1921	Pro Vercelli	163	(7)

International career
1911–1920	Italy	13	(1)

Managerial career
- 1919–1926: Pro Vercelli
- 1927–1929: Comense
- 1934–1937: Fiorentina
- 1932–1934: Pro Vercelli
- 1937–1940: Roma
- 1940–1941: A.C. Milan
- 1941–1944: Genoa
- 1946–1947: Fiorentina
- 1947–1948: Lecco
- * Club domestic league appearances and goals

Guido Ara (Italian pronunciation: [ˈɡwiːdo ˈaːra]; 28 August 1888 – 2 July 1975) was an Italian association footballer and manager who played as a midfielder.

== Club career ==
Hailing from Vercelli in the region of Piedmont, Ara is most noted for his entire playing career at his hometown side Pro Vercelli, where he was a one club man, winning six Serie A titles; during the club's entire history they only won seven.

== International career ==
At international level, Ara represented Italy. He was named in Italy's squad for the 1920 Summer Olympics, but did not play in any matches.

== Managing career ==
Ara went on to manage some of the top clubs in Italy, including Pro Vercelli; he managed the club when they won their seventh and final scudetto title, meaning that Ara was at Pro Vercelli when the club won all of its seven Italian Football Championship titles. He later also coached A.C. Milan during the 1940–41 season.

== Honours ==
=== Player ===
Pro Vercelli

- Italian Football Championship: 1908, 1909, 1910–11, 1911–12, 1912–13, 1920–21

=== Manager ===
Pro Vercelli

- Italian Football Championship: 1921–22
