= History of FC Pro Vercelli 1892 =

Italian football club history

The history of Football Club Pro Vercelli 1892 officially started in 2010, following the collapse of U.S. Pro Vercelli Calcio in Lega Pro Seconda Divisione, based in Vercelli, Piedmont. The previous incarnation of the club was founded in 1892 and was one of the most successful Italian clubs in the early decades of the twentieth century, winning seven national titles between 1908 and 1922. Its trademark and honours were transferred from Vercelli municipality to A.S. Pro Belvedere Vercelli, the city's other team (founded in 2006), which changed its name and was therefore allowed to continue the history of Pro Vercelli.

== The trademark "Pro Vercelli" ==
=== From 1892 to 2010 by U.S. Pro Vercelli Calcio ===
==== Foundation ====
The Società Ginnastica Pro Vercelli (Pro Vercelli Gymnastics Society) was established in 1892, with its Football Division founded in 1903. The first official match for the football division of S.G. Pro Vercelli took place on 3 August 1903 against the Forza e Costanza.

1907 saw Pro Vercelli's football team win the Subs Division, and subsequently the club were admitted to Italian National League for the first time. Success followed quickly, with the following two years (1908 and 1909) producing the first national championship titles for the "White Shirts".

==== Early success ====
The team earned a place in the 1909–10 Championship final. However, a disagreement arose with the Italian Football Federation (F.I.F. – now called the F.I.G.C.) on the arranged date of the match, which clashed with another, previously scheduled match. Pro Vercelli chose to take part only with a youth team, eventually losing the title to Inter.

Nevertheless, the Leoni ("Lions", so called for their notorious hard and not always clean tackles) did not take long to once again prove their supremacy in Italian football. They remained undefeated for the next three seasons, with the unprecedented capture of three titles in a row in 1910–11, 1911–12 and 1912–13.

These years began the legends of the famous Midfield Line of Wonders, formed by Ara, Milano I and Leone. In the same years Pro Vercelli also formed, the backbone of the first Italian national teams, with nine players representing the Piedmont club.

After a successful beginning, Pro Vercelli did not win another National title until the Great War and 1920–21. In the following years Pro Vercelli remained among the best Italian teams, but fell short of achieving the top prize. Other teams such as arch-rivals Casale, Genoa and Inter overtook the "White Shirts", breaking a dominance not experienced before or since.

In 1921–22, after a row over the structure of the Italian league competition, the Italian Football Federation split, with all the major teams forming the independent Italian Football Confederation (C.C.I.). Pro Vercelli joined the CCI league, which had a structure with fewer matches over the year, subsequently regaining their 7th National title, their last to date.

Pro Vercelli were then invited to Rio de Janeiro to play against Flamengo and Botafogo. In the days before formalised European competition, Liverpool F.C., during a European tour as English Champions, played Pro Vercelli, and the result was a draw.

==== Decline ====
1934-35 was the season that marked the beginning of the slow but steady decline of Pro Vercelli. The Bianche Casacche were eventually relegated to Serie B. The steady modernisation of the game saw the small town team drop to Serie C for the first time in 1940–41. It returned to Serie B in 1946 and stayed for 2 years. It played in Serie C between 1948–1962 and 1971–1978.

In the 1977–78 season the team were relegated to Serie C2 and the following season to Serie D. They returned to Serie C2 in 1984, but were relegated back to Serie D the subsequent season.

==== Scudetto Dilettanti 1993–94 ====
It returns in Serie C2 on 1994 when wins group A of Serie D and the Scudetto Dilettanti.

==== The folding and rebirth ====
In recent years, U.S. Pro Vercelli Calcio have been fairly stable at mid-table in the Italian fourth division (Serie C2). In July 2005 a new chairman, Vero Paganoni, took over at the helm of the club.

Due to large debts it was not allowed to participate in the 2010–11 Lega Pro Seconda Divisione and so folded.

In the summer of 2010 the club changes its name to U.S. Vercelli Calcio, Vero Paganoni remained as president of a club that today is inactive, therefore A.S. Pro Belvedere Vercelli becomes the new Pro Vercelli.

==== Honours ====
- Italian Football Championship
  - Champions 7: 1908, 1909, 1910–11, 1911–12, 1912–13, 1920–21, 1921–22
  - Runners-up 1: 1909–10
- Serie B
  - Winners 1: 1907
- Serie D
  - Winners 4: 1956–57, 1970–71, 1983–1984, 1993–1994
- Scudetto Dilettanti:
  - Winners 1: 1993–94

=== Since 2010 by F.C. Pro Vercelli 1892 ===
==== The myth continues with the new Pro Vercelli ====
Honours and trademark were assigned from Vercelli municipality to A.S. Pro Belvedere Vercelli, that changed its denomination to the current one.

In season 2010–11 the team played in Lega Pro Seconda Divisione ranking 3rd and was eliminated from Pro Patria in the semifinal of the play-off, but 4 August 2011 it was later admitted to Lega Pro Prima Divisione to fill vacancies. In this season it was promoted to Serie B after 64 years, but in the next it was again relegated to Lega Pro Prima Divisione.
