= Carlo Rampini =

Italian footballer (1891-1968)

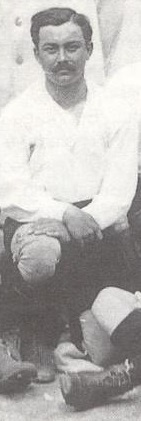
- Rampini in 1911.

Personal information
- Full name: Carlo Rampini
- Date of birth: 25 October 1891
- Place of birth: Candia Lomellina, Italy
- Date of death: 28 March 1968 (aged 76)
- Place of death: Vercelli, Italy
- Position: Midfielder

Senior career*
Years	Team	Apps	(Gls)
1908–1914	Pro Vercelli	99	(106)

International career
1911–1913	Italy	8	(3)
- * Club domestic league appearances and goals

Carlo Rampini (25 October 1891 – 28 March 1968) was an Italian footballer who played as a midfielder. He represented the Italy national football team eight times, the first being on 6 January 1911, on the occasion of a friendly match against the Hungary in a 1–0 home loss. He was also part of Italy's squad for the football tournament at the 1912 Summer Olympics, but he did not play in any matches.

His brother Alessandro Rampini was also a footballer for Pro Vercelli.

== Honours ==
=== Player ===
Pro Vercelli

- Italian Football Championship: 1908, 1909, 1910–11, 1911–12, 1912–13
