= Felice Berardo =

Italian footballer

Personal information
- Date of birth: 6 July 1888
- Place of birth: Turin, Kingdom of Italy
- Date of death: 12 December 1956 (aged 68)
- Place of death: Turin, Italy
- Position: Striker

Senior career*
Years	Team	Apps	(Gls)
1909–1911	Piemonte	5	(0)
1911–1914	Pro Vercelli	38	(14)
1914–1916	Genoa	21	(7)
1917	Torino		
1919–1921	Torinese		
1921–1925	Torino	42	(6)

International career
1911–1920	Italy	14	(2)
- * Club domestic league appearances and goals

Felice Berardo (Italian pronunciation: [feˈliːtʃe beˈrardo]; 6 July 1888 – 12 December 1956) was an Italian footballer who played as a striker. He made his debut for the Italy national football team on 6 January 1911 in a game against Hungary. He also represented Italy at the 1912 Summer Olympics.

== Honours ==
=== Player ===
Pro Vercelli

Italian Football Championship: 1911–12, 1912–13

Genoa

Italian Football Championship: 1914–15
