= 1919–20 Prima Categoria =

19th season of top-tier Italian football

Prima Categoria
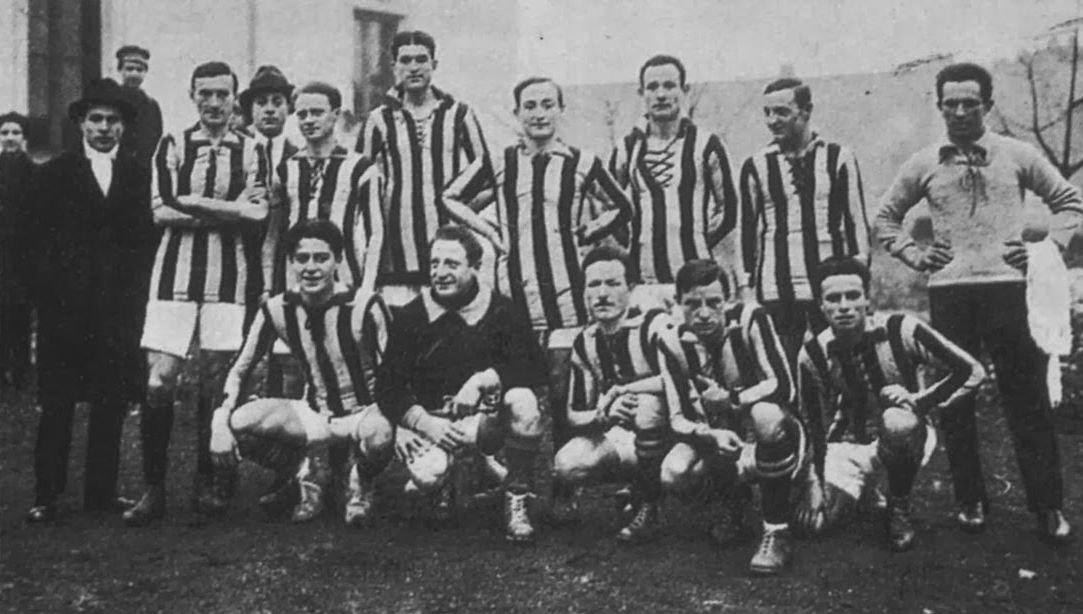
- 1919–20 Internazionale team
- Season: 1919–20
- Champions: Internazionale; 2nd title

The 1919-20 Prima Categoria was the nineteenth edition of the Italian Football Championship and the thirteenth since the re-brand to Prima Categoria. It was the first Italian football championship after World War One. The 1919–20 Prima Categoria was the second national title won by Internazionale.

== Regulation ==
Struggles between minor and major clubs continued after four years of wartime break. The planned split between two national leagues had been forgotten, and the regional FAs became the lords of the tournament, which was expanded to 48 clubs. The championship was divided in a preliminary regional phase of ten matchdays, while the following national phase was split into a semifinal round of ten matchdays and a final round between three clubs.

The main tournament was split in eight groups of six clubs. First and second clubs, together with the third teams of Piedmont, advanced to the national championship. Worst clubs had to ask for re-election.

National championship was split in three groups of six clubs. Group winners advanced to the final group of three clubs. The whole tournament consequently had twenty-two matchdays.

The experimental Southern groups had their own special regulations.

== Teams ==
Six clubs had collapsed during the war. However, Regional FAs agreed to expand the league to 48 clubs. They variously chose to promote, re-elect, or invite clubs to fill the spots they had been granted to.

== Pre-league qualifications ==
=== Piedmont ===
Played on October 5, 1919, in Alessandria.

Team 1	Score	Team 2
Alessandrina	1-0	US Novarese

=== Lombardy ===
Played on October 5, 1919.

Team 1	Score	Team 2
Enotria Goliardo	2-0	Pro Patria et Libertate
Trevigliese	3-2	Monza
Atalanta	2-0	Soc. Bergamasca Ginnastica & Scherma

=== Liguria ===
All matches played on November 5, 1919, in Genoa. Three available spots.

==== Round 1 ====
Team 1	Score	Team 2
Sampierdarenese	1-0	SPES Genova
GC Grifone	5-1	Sestrese

==== Round 2 ====
Team 1	Score	Team 2
SPES Genova	3-0	Sestrese

=== Emilia ===
Matches played on September 29 and October 5, 1919, in Bologna.

==== Round 1 ====
Team 1	Score	Team 2
GS Bolognese	1-0	Audace

==== Round 2 ====
Team 1	Score	Team 2
GS Bolognese	1-0	SPAL

=== Campania ===
==== Round 1 ====
Team 1	Score	Team 2
Pro Caserta	6-0	Brasiliano
Savoia	3-2	Stabia

==== Round 2 ====
Team 1	Score	Team 2
Pro Caserta	4-0	Savoia

=== Verdicts ===
Atalanta, Enotria Goliardo, Grifone GC, Sampierdarenese, GS Bolognese, Pro Caserta, SPES Genova, Trevigliese and Alessandrina were admitted to the 1a Categoria.

Amatori Giuoco Calcio Torino, Pastore, Ausonia Pro Gorla, Legnano, Saronno, Varese, Pavia, Carpi, Mantova, and Nazionale Emilia had been previously added to the championship by the Regional FAs.

== Northern Italy ==
=== Qualifications ===
==== Piedmont - Group A ====
===== Classification =====
Pos	Team	Pld	W	D	L	GF	GA	GD	Pts	Promotion or relegation
1	Pro Vercelli	10	7	2	1	29	7	+22	16	Qualified
2	Juventus	10	6	4	0	25	5	+20	16	Qualified
3	Torino	10	6	3	1	27	10	+17	15	Qualified
4	Biellese	10	2	1	7	12	34	−22	5	
5	Amatori Torino	10	1	2	7	7	24	−17	4	Relegation play-off
6	Alessandrina (E)	10	1	2	7	12	32	−20	4	Merged with Alessandria

Source: Panini
(E) Eliminated

===== Results table =====
Home \ Away	AMT	BIE	JUV	PVE	TOR	ALE
Amatori Torino		4–2	1–5	0–4	2–2	2–3
Biellese	1–0		0–3	1–6	2–9	4–2
Juventus	3–1	4–0		1–1	1–1	3–0
Pro Vercelli	8–1	3–0	0–0		1–0	2–0
Torino	3–0	3–2	1–1	4–0		3–1
Alessandrina	1–1	0–0	0–4	0–4	0–1	

Updated to match(es) played on unknown. Source: Almanacco Illustrato del Calcio - La Storia 1898-2004, Panini Edizioni, Modena, September 2005 (in Italian)
Legend: Blue = home team win; Yellow = draw; Red = away team win.

===== Relegation play-off =====
Played on February 2, 1920, in Novara.

Team 1	Score	Team 2
Amatori Torino	2-1	Alessandrina

==== Piedmont - Group B ====
===== Classification =====
Pos	Team	Pld	W	D	L	GF	GA	GD	Pts	Promotion or relegation
1	Alessandria	10	9	1	0	29	7	+22	19	Qualified
2	Casale	10	5	2	3	20	13	+7	12	Qualified
3	Novara	10	5	1	4	25	14	+11	11	Qualified
4	US Torinese	10	3	2	5	14	26	−12	8	
5	Pastore Torino	10	3	1	6	21	28	−7	7	
6	Valenzana (T)	10	0	3	7	5	26	−21	3	Re-elected

Source: Panini
(T) Qualified, but not yet for the particular phase indicated

===== Results table =====
Home \ Away	ALE	CSL	NOV	PAS	UST	VAL
Alessandria		4–2	3–0	4–1	1–0	6–0
Casale	1–1		3–0	3–2	1–1	3–1
Novara	0–1	1–0		8–1	6–1	5–1
Pastore Torino	1–2	1–2	1–4		3–1	2–0
US Torinese	2–5	2–1	2–0	3–8		2–1
Valenzana	0–2	0–4	1–1	1–1	0–0	

Updated to match(es) played on unknown. Source: Almanacco Illustrato del Calcio - La Storia 1898-2004, Panini Edizioni, Modena, September 2005 (in Italian)
Legend: Blue = home team win; Yellow = draw; Red = away team win.

==== Liguria ====
===== Classification =====
Pos	Team	Pld	W	D	L	GF	GA	GD	Pts	Promotion or relegation
1	Genoa	10	9	1	0	49	3	+46	19	Qualified
2	Andrea Doria	10	6	3	1	29	9	+20	15	Qualified
3	GC Grifone (E)	10	3	2	5	11	35	−24	8	Disbanded
4	Sampierdarenese	10	2	3	5	12	28	−16	7	
5	Savona	10	2	2	6	8	21	−13	6	
6	SPES Genova (T)	10	2	1	7	5	18	−13	5	Re-elected

Source: Panini
(E) Eliminated; (T) Qualified, but not yet for the particular phase indicated

===== Results table =====
Home \ Away	ADO	GEN	GRI	SAM	SVN	SGE
Andrea Doria		1–1	6–0	4–1	3–1	4–0
Genoa	5–1		6–0	8–0	5–0	3–0
GC Grifone	0–7	0–8		3–1	1–1	1–0
Sampierdarenese	1–1	0–4	4–4		1–2	1–0
Savona	0–0	0–4	0–2	2–3		0–1
SPES Genova	0–2	1–5	2–0	0–0	1–2	

Updated to match(es) played on unknown. Source: Almanacco Illustrato del Calcio - La Storia 1898-2004, Panini Edizioni, Modena, September 2005 (in Italian)
Legend: Blue = home team win; Yellow = draw; Red = away team win.

==== Lombardy - Group A ====
===== Classification =====
Pos	Team	Pld	W	D	L	GF	GA	GD	Pts	Promotion or relegation
1	Internazionale	10	8	2	0	42	12	+30	18	Qualified
2	Brescia	10	6	2	2	21	16	+5	14	Qualified
3	Juventus Italia	10	4	1	5	16	15	+1	9	Qualification play-off
4	Trevigliese	10	2	5	3	21	25	−4	9	Qualification play-off
5	A.C. Libertas	10	2	1	7	11	31	−20	5	Relegation play-off
6	Cremonese (T)	10	2	1	7	14	26	−12	5	Re-elected

Source: Panini
(T) Qualified, but not yet for the particular phase indicated

===== Results table =====
Home \ Away	BRE	CRE	INT	JIT	LMI	TVG
Brescia		1–0	1–1	4–0	4–0	3–3
Cremonese	2–4		0–2	0–3	5–3	3–1
Internazionale	6–0	5–2		4–2	6–0	8–2
Juventus Italia	2–0	2–0	2–4		0–1	0–1
Libertas Milano	0–1	4–1	0–3	0–4		3–3
Trevigliese	2–3	1–1	3–3	1–1	4–0	

Updated to match(es) played on unknown. Source: Almanacco Illustrato del Calcio - La Storia 1898-2004, Panini Edizioni, Modena, September 2005 (in Italian)
Legend: Blue = home team win; Yellow = draw; Red = away team win.

===== Qualification playoff =====
Played on January 4, 1920, in Brescia.

Team 1	Score	Team 2
Juventus Italia	2-0	Trevigliese

According to season 1919-20's FIGC rules in case of two teams sharing same position a playoff should have been played. When FIGC managers were noticed of too many matches programmed not for promotion or relegation sudden decided to change rules, just because of the few referees available for those matches, and upcoming matches (lower divisions) urged to get started. Later this playoff wasn't considered for the final table.

===== Relegation playoff =====
Played on February 15, 1920, in Brescia.

Team 1	Score	Team 2
Libertas Milano	2-0	Cremonese

==== Lombardy - Group B ====
===== Classification =====
Pos	Team	Pld	W	D	L	GF	GA	GD	Pts	Promotion or relegation
1	Milan	10	10	0	0	43	8	+35	20	Qualified
2	Enotria Goliardo	10	7	0	3	24	15	+9	14	Qualified
3	Atalanta	10	4	1	5	11	16	−5	11 (Note: 2 bonus points?)	
4	Chiasso	10	3	2	5	15	18	−3	8	
5	Pavia	10	2	1	7	11	19	−8	5	
6	Ausonia Pro Gorla (T)	10	0	2	8	8	36	−28	2	Re-elected

Source: Panini
(T) Qualified, but not yet for the particular phase indicated

===== Results table =====
Home \ Away	ATA	AUS	CHI	ENO	MIL	PAV
Atalanta		2–0	1–0	0–2	0–4	1–0
Ausonia Pro Gorla	1–2		0–4	4–7	0–10	0–2
Chiasso	3–3	1–1		2–0	1–2	1–3
Enotria Goliardo	1–0	4–0	4–0		1–4	3–2
Milan	5–1	3–1	3–1	3–1		3–1
Pavia	0–1	1–1	1–2	0–1	1–6	

Updated to match(es) played on unknown. Source: Almanacco Illustrato del Calcio - La Storia 1898-2004, Panini Edizioni, Modena, September 2005 (in Italian)
Legend: Blue = home team win; Yellow = draw; Red = away team win.

==== Lombardy - Group C ====
===== Classification =====
Pos	Team	Pld	W	D	L	GF	GA	GD	Pts	Promotion or relegation
1	US Milanese	10	8	2	0	35	8	+27	18	Qualified
2	Legnano	10	7	1	2	26	7	+19	15	Qualified
3	Saronno	10	6	0	4	25	18	+7	12	
4	Nazionale Lombardia	10	3	1	6	19	33	−14	7	
5	Varese	10	1	2	7	15	30	−15	4	Relegation play-off
6	Como (T)	10	2	0	8	13	37	−24	4	Re-elected

Source: Panini
(T) Qualified, but not yet for the particular phase indicated

===== Results table =====
Home \ Away	COM	LEG	NLO	SAR	USM	VAR
Como		0–4	2–1	1–4	1–8	5–3
Legnano	4–0		4–1	2–0	0–1	3–0
Nazionale Lombardia	4–2	1–4		4–2	2–6	5–4
Saronno	4–2	3–1	4–0		0–3	5–1
US Milanese	3–0	1–1	4–0	3–1		2–2
Varese	2–0	0–3	1–1	1–2	1–4	

Updated to match(es) played on unknown. Source: Almanacco Illustrato del Calcio - La Storia 1898-2004, Panini Edizioni, Modena, September 2005 (in Italian)
Legend: Blue = home team win; Yellow = draw; Red = away team win.

===== Relegation play-off =====
Played on February 8, 1920, in Saronno.

Team 1	Score	Team 2
Varese	2-1	Como

==== Veneto ====
===== Classification =====
Pos	Team	Pld	W	D	L	GF	GA	GD	Pts	Promotion or relegation
1	Padova	10	8	1	1	25	6	+19	17	Qualified
2	Venezia	10	5	3	2	13	9	+4	13	Qualified
3	Petrarca Padova	10	5	1	4	24	20	+4	11	
4	Vicenza	10	3	1	6	14	19	−5	7	
5	Hellas Verona	10	2	2	6	15	26	−11	6	Relegation play-off
6	Udinese (T)	10	2	2	6	7	18	−11	6	Re-elected

Source: Panini
(T) Qualified, but not yet for the particular phase indicated

===== Results table =====
Home \ Away	HEL	PAD	PET	UDI	VEN	VIC
Hellas Verona		1–2	3–3	5–0	0–0	2–1
Padova	7–0		2–0 (Note: Forfeit)	3–1	0–1	4–0
Petrarca Padova	4–3	1–2		2–0	4–2	3–5
Udinese	3–1	1–1	1–2		0–0	0–2
Venezia	3–0	1–3	1–0	2–0		1–1
Vicenza	3–0	0–1	1–5	0–1	1–2	

Updated to match(es) played on unknown. Source: Almanacco Illustrato del Calcio - La Storia 1898-2004, Panini Edizioni, Modena, September 2005 (in Italian)
Legend: Blue = home team win; Yellow = draw; Red = away team win.

===== Relegation play-off =====
Played on March 14, 1920, in Venice.

Team 1	Score	Team 2
Hellas Verona	1-0	Udinese

==== Emilia ====
===== Classification =====
Pos	Team	Pld	W	D	L	GF	GA	GD	Pts	Promotion or relegation
1	Bologna	10	8	2	0	39	5	+34	18	Qualified
2	Modena	10	6	3	1	30	6	+24	15	Qualified
3	Mantova	10	3	4	3	11	11	0	10	
4	Carpi	10	3	1	6	9	22	−13	7	
5	Nazionale Emilia	10	2	2	6	7	28	−21	6	
6	GS Bolognese (T)	10	2	0	8	9	33	−24	4	Re-elected

Source: Panini
(T) Qualified, but not yet for the particular phase indicated

===== Results table =====
Home \ Away	BOL	CRP	GSB	MAN	MOD	NEM
Bologna		2–0	8–0	0–0	4–0	9–0
Carpi	2–6		2–1	0–0	0–3	0–1
GS Bolognese	2–4	0–2		3–0	1–9	2–0
Mantova	1–3	2–1	2–0		0–0	5–1
Modena	0–0	6–0	4–0	2–0		5–0
Nazionale Emilia	0–3	1–2	2–0	1–1	1–1	

Updated to match(es) played on unknown. Source: Almanacco Illustrato del Calcio - La Storia 1898-2004, Panini Edizioni, Modena, September 2005 (in Italian)
Legend: Blue = home team win; Yellow = draw; Red = away team win.

=== Semifinals ===
The National semifinals had 18 clubs: six from Piedmont and Lombardy FAs, two from the other three Regional FAs.

==== Group A ====
===== Classification =====
Pos	Team	Pld	W	D	L	GF	GA	GD	Pts	Promotion or relegation
1	Genoa	10	9	1	0	24	6	+18	19	Qualified
2	Pro Vercelli	10	6	2	2	20	11	+9	14	
3	Alessandria	10	5	1	4	13	11	+2	11	
4	Milan	10	4	1	5	13	16	−3	9	
5	Legnano	10	1	3	6	8	18	−10	5	
6	Venezia	10	0	2	8	5	21	−16	2	

Source: Panini

===== Results table =====
Home \ Away	ALE	GEN	LEG	MIL	PVE	VEN
Alessandria		0–2	2–0	2–0	1–1	3–1
Genoa	2–1		5–0	2–1	2–1	5–0
Legnano	1–2	0–1		1–1	2–1	1–1
Milan	3–0	0–2	3–1		1–2	2–1
Pro Vercelli	1–0	1–1	2–1	5–1		4–1
Venezia	0–1	0–2	0–0	0–1	1–2	

Updated to match(es) played on unknown. Source: Almanacco Illustrato del Calcio - La Storia 1898-2004, Panini Edizioni, Modena, September 2005 (in Italian)
Legend: Blue = home team win; Yellow = draw; Red = away team win.

==== Group B ====
===== Classification =====
Pos	Team	Pld	W	D	L	GF	GA	GD	Pts	Promotion or relegation
1	Juventus	10	8	1	1	21	4	+17	17	Qualified
2	US Milanese	10	7	1	2	14	10	+4	15	
3	Modena	10	4	1	5	17	13	+4	9	
4	Casale	10	2	4	4	7	8	−1	8	
5	Brescia	10	2	2	6	4	14	−10	6	
6	Padova	10	2	1	7	10	24	−14	5	

Source: Panini

===== Results table =====
Home \ Away	BRE	CSL	JUV	MOD	PAD	USM
Brescia		0–0	0–0	2–1	1–2	0–1
Casale	3–0		0–1	0–2 (Note: Forfeit)	1–0	1–1
Juventus	2–0	1–0		3–0	6–1	3–0
Modena	4–0	1–1	0–1		4–1	0–1
Padova	1–0	0–0	1–3	2–4		1–3
US Milanese	0–1	2–1	2–1	2–1	2–1	

Updated to match(es) played on unknown. Source: Almanacco Illustrato del Calcio - La Storia 1898-2004, Panini Edizioni, Modena, September 2005 (in Italian)
Legend: Blue = home team win; Yellow = draw; Red = away team win.

==== Group C ====
===== Classification =====
Pos	Team	Pld	W	D	L	GF	GA	GD	Pts	Promotion or relegation
1	Internazionale	10	7	2	1	37	13	+24	16	Qualified
2	Novara	10	6	1	3	22	15	+7	13	
3	Bologna	10	6	1	3	20	14	+6	13	
4	Torino	10	4	1	5	17	21	−4	9	
5	Andrea Doria	10	2	1	7	14	21	−7	5	
6	Enotria Goliardo	10	2	0	8	11	37	−26	4	

Source: Panini

===== Results table =====
Home \ Away	ADO	BOL	ENO	INT	NOV	TOR
Andrea Doria		1–4	3–1	3–3	1–2	0–1
Bologna	2–0		7–1	0–1	2–0	2–1
Enotria Goliardo	3–1	1–2		1–5	0–5	2–0 (Note: Forfeit)
Internazionale	1–0	5–0	7–0		5–2	4–0
Novara	3–2	1–1	5–1	1–0		2–0
Torino	1–3	3–0	2–1	6–6	3–1	

Updated to match(es) played on unknown. Source: Almanacco Illustrato del Calcio - La Storia 1898-2004, Panini Edizioni, Modena, September 2005 (in Italian)
Legend: Blue = home team win; Yellow = draw; Red = away team win.

=== Final round ===
==== Classification ====
Pos	Team	Pld	W	D	L	GF	GA	GD	Pts	Promotion or relegation
1	Internazionale	2	1	1	0	2	1	+1	3	Champions and qualified
2	Juventus	2	1	0	1	3	3	0	2	
3	Genoa	2	0	1	1	3	4	−1	1	

Source: Panini

==== Results ====
Team 1	Score	Team 2
Juventus	3–2	Genoa
Internazionale	1–0	Juventus
Internazionale	1–1	Genoa

== Southern Italy tournament ==
An experimental amatorial tournament was played in Southern Italy.

=== Final round ===
Played on 13 June 1920, in Bologna.

Team 1	Score	Team 2
Livorno	3–2	Fortitudo Roma

Livorno qualified to the National Final.

== National final ==
Played on 20 June 1920, in Bologna.

Team 1	Score	Team 2
Internazionale	3–2	Livorno

== References and sources ==
- Almanacco Illustrato del Calcio - La Storia 1898-2004, Panini Edizioni, Modena, September 2005
