= 1914–15 Prima Categoria =

18th season of top-tier Italian football

Prima Categoria
- Season: 1914–15
- Champions: Genoa; 7th title

The 1914–15 Prima Categoria was the eighteenth edition of the Italian Football Championship and the twelfth since the re-brand to Prima Categoria. The championship was suspended before completion, due to Italy entering World War I on 24 May 1915. Despite the season not concluding, Genoa were declared champions by the Federation after the War, since Genoa topped the table with one game remaining in the Northern Italy Final Round.

== Regulation ==
Struggles between minor and major clubs continued. As a compromise, the championship was divided into a preliminary regional phase of ten matchdays, while the following national phase was split into a semi-final round and a final round of six matchdays each. More, the championship would be split in two categories, A and B, for 1915–16 season. However, finally the championship was expanded to 36 clubs.

The main tournament was split in six groups of six clubs. First and second clubs, together with the four best third teams, advanced to the national championship. Fourth place and worse clubs would be relegated to the new "Category B".

National championship was split in four groups of four clubs. Group winners advanced to the final group of four clubs. The whole tournament consequently had twenty-two matchdays.

The experimental Southern groups had their own special regulations.

== Teams ==
Veloces Biella for Piedmont, Cremonese for Lombardy, Padova for Veneto and Audax Modena for Emilia had been promoted. Two relegated clubs were re-elected. More, minor clubs voted to expand the championship so Acqui, Valenzana, Savoia Milan and Swiss side FC Chiasso were invited to join.

== Main tournament ==
=== Qualifications ===
The first two teams of every group and the best four teams that finished third, advanced to the semi-finals.

Group A and B were organized by the Turin committee, group C and D and E by the Milan committee, and group F by the Venice committee.

==== Group A ====
===== Classification =====
Pos	Team	Pld	W	D	L	GF	GA	GD	Pts	Qualification
1	Genoa	10	9	0	1	61	5	+56	18	Qualified for Semi-finals
2	Alessandria	10	6	2	2	36	7	+29	14	Qualified for Semi-finals
3	Andrea Doria	10	6	1	3	20	18	+2	13	Qualified for Semi-finals
4	Savona (T)	10	4	2	4	17	23	−6	10	1915 –16 Cat.B never played
5	Acqui (R)	10	1	1	8	5	62	−57	3	Relegated
6	AC Ligure (H)	10	0	2	8	8	32	−24	2	Acquired by Sampierdarena

Source: Panini
(H) Hosts; (R) Relegated; (T) Qualified, but not yet for the particular phase indicated

===== Results table =====
Home \ Away	LIG	ACQ	ALE	ADO	GEN	SVN
AC Ligure		2–2	0–3	1–3	1–4	2–2
Acqui	3–1		0–9	0–3	0–16	0–5
Alessandria	5–0	6–0		2–2	3–0	5–0
Andrea Doria	4–1	4–0	2–1		0–8	1–0
Genoa	3–0	12–0	2–1	3–0		7–0
Savona	3–0	4–0	1–1	2–1	0–6	

Updated to match(es) played on unknown. Source: Almanacco Illustrato del Calcio – La Storia 1898–2004, Panini Edizioni, Modena, September 2005 (in Italian)
Legend: Blue = home team win; Yellow = draw; Red = away team win.

==== Group B ====
===== Classification =====
Pos	Team	Pld	W	D	L	GF	GA	GD	Pts	Qualification
1	Torino	10	9	1	0	37	8	+29	19	Qualified for Semi-finals
2	Juventus	10	7	1	2	46	14	+32	15	Qualified for Semi-finals
3	Vigor Torino	10	7	0	3	27	20	+7	14	Qualified for Semi-finals
4	Valenzana (T)	10	2	2	6	10	30	−20	6	1915 –16 Cat.B never played
5	Piemonte (E)	10	2	1	7	12	33	−21	5	Disbanded
6	Veloces (T)	10	0	1	9	8	35	−27	1	1915 –16 Cat.B never played

Source: Panini
(E) Eliminated; (T) Qualified, but not yet for the particular phase indicated

===== Results table =====
Home \ Away	JUV	PIE	TOR	VAL	VEL	VTO
Juventus		8–1	2–7	6–0	5–0	2–3
Piemonte	2–6		0–2	2–2	2–0	2–6
Torino	1–1	4–0		4–0	4–1	5–2
Valenzana	0–9	2–0	0–3		4–1	0–2
Veloces	0–4	2–3	1–2	1–1		1–3
Vigor Torino	0–3	1–0	1–5	2–1	7–1	

Updated to match(es) played on unknown. Source: Almanacco Illustrato del Calcio – La Storia 1898–2004, Panini Edizioni, Modena, September 2005 (in Italian)
Legend: Blue = home team win; Yellow = draw; Red = away team win.

==== Group C ====
Savoia Milano forfeited before the start of the Championship.

===== Classification =====
Pos	Team	Pld	W	D	L	GF	GA	GD	Pts	Qualification
1	Pro Vercelli	8	6	1	1	20	6	+14	13	Qualified for Semi-finals
2	Casale	8	5	2	1	14	3	+11	12	Qualified for Semi-finals
3	Novara	8	4	0	4	12	8	+4	8	Qualified for Semi-finals
4	Nazionale Lombardia (T)	8	3	1	4	10	22	−12	7	1915 –16 Categoria B never played
5	Racing Libertas Milan (T)	8	0	0	8	4	21	−17	0	1915 –16 Categoria B never played
6	Savoia Milan (E)	0	0	0	0	0	0	0	0	Disbanded

Source: Panini
(E) Eliminated; (T) Qualified, but not yet for the particular phase indicated

===== Results table =====
Home \ Away	CSL	NLO	NOV	PVE	RAC
Casale		6–0	1–0	2–0	1–0
Nazionale Lombardia	1–1		1–2	1–3	4–1
Novara	1–0	0–1		1–2	5–0
Pro Vercelli	1–1	9–0	1–0		2–1
Racing Libertas Milano	0–2	0–2	2–3	0–2	

Updated to match(es) played on unknown. Source: Almanacco Illustrato del Calcio – La Storia 1898–2004, Panini Edizioni, Modena, September 2005 (in Italian)
Legend: Blue = home team win; Yellow = draw; Red = away team win.

==== Group D ====
===== Classification =====
Pos	Team	Pld	W	D	L	GF	GA	GD	Pts	Qualification
1	Milan	10	9	1	0	52	3	+49	19	Qualified for Semi-finals
2	Juventus Italia	10	4	5	1	27	16	+11	13	Qualified for Semi-finals
3	Bologna	10	2	5	3	15	24	−9	9	
4	AC Milanese (E)	10	3	2	5	26	19	+7	8	Disbanded
5	Chiasso (T)	10	2	3	5	24	37	−13	7	1915 –16 Cat.B never played
6	Audax Modena (E)	10	2	0	8	14	59	−45	4	Disbanded

Source: Panini
(E) Eliminated; (T) Qualified, but not yet for the particular phase indicated

===== Results table =====
Home \ Away	USM	AMO	BOL	CHI	JIT	MIL
AC Milanese		9–0	1–2	10–1	0–0	0–3
Audax Modena	2–4		4–1	2–0	2–4	0–2
Bologna	1–1	4–2		3–3	0–0	0–1
Chiasso	3–1	9–1	2–2		4–4	1–7
Juventus Italia	2–0	13–1	1–1	2–1		0–6
Milan	5–0	13–0	9–1	5–0	1–1	

Updated to match(es) played on unknown. Source: Almanacco Illustrato del Calcio – La Storia 1898–2004, Panini Edizioni, Modena, September 2005 (in Italian)
Legend: Blue = home team win; Yellow = draw; Red = away team win.

==== Group E ====
===== Classification =====
Pos	Team	Pld	W	D	L	GF	GA	GD	Pts	Qualification
1	Internazionale	10	9	0	1	60	8	+52	18	Qualified for Semi-finals
2	Como	10	5	2	3	22	20	+2	12	Qualified for Semi-finals
3	US Milanese	10	3	4	3	21	32	−11	10	
4	Brescia (T)	10	3	2	5	10	18	−8	8	1915 –16 Categoria B never played
4	Cremonese (T)	10	4	0	6	15	25	−10	8	1915 –16 Categoria B never played
6	Modena (T)	10	1	2	7	13	38	−25	4	1915 –16 Categoria B never played

Source: Panini
(T) Qualified, but not yet for the particular phase indicated

===== Results table =====
Home \ Away	BRE	COM	CRE	INT	MOD	USM
Brescia		2–0	2–0	0–2	3–1	1–1
Como	2–0		1–0	3–2	7–0	2–2
Cremonese	2–1	1–2		1–5	4–2	5–4
Internazionale	8–0	6–0	6–0		8–0	12–1
Modena	1–1	4–2	0–1	1–7		3–3
US Milanese	1–0	3–3	2–1	2–4	2–1	

Updated to match(es) played on unknown. Source: Almanacco Illustrato del Calcio – La Storia 1898–2004, Panini Edizioni, Modena, September 2005 (in Italian)
Legend: Blue = home team win; Yellow = draw; Red = away team win.

==== Group F ====
===== Classification =====
Pos	Team	Pld	W	D	L	GF	GA	GD	Pts	Qualification
1	Vicenza	10	8	0	2	43	13	+30	16	Qualified for Semi-finals
2	Hellas Verona	10	7	1	2	28	15	+13	15	Qualified for Semi-finals
3	Venezia	10	4	4	2	23	18	+5	12	Qualified for Semi-finals
4	Padova (T)	10	3	1	6	23	37	−14	7	1915 –16 Categoria B never played
5	Udinese (T)	10	2	2	6	15	24	−9	6	1915 –16 Categoria B never played
6	Petrarca Padova (T)	10	2	0	8	11	36	−25	4	1915 –16 Categoria B never played

Source: Panini
(T) Qualified, but not yet for the particular phase indicated

===== Results table =====
Home \ Away	HEL	PAD	PET	UDI	VEN	VIC
Hellas Verona		7–2	4–3	2–0	1–1	1–0
Padova	2–5		2–0	4–1	3–5	1–3
Petrarca Padova	1–5	3–2		2–1	0–2	2–7
Udinese	0–4	2–0	3–2		1–0	0–1
Venezia	3–0	2–4	2–0	2–2		0–2
Vicenza	3–2	10–2	6–0	5–1	6–1	

Updated to match(es) played on unknown. Source: Almanacco Illustrato del Calcio – La Storia 1898–2004, Panini Edizioni, Modena, September 2005 (in Italian)
Legend: Blue = home team win; Yellow = draw; Red = away team win.

=== Semi-finals ===
==== Group A ====
===== Classification =====
Pos	Team	Pld	W	D	L	GF	GA	GD	Pts	Qualification
1	Genoa	6	5	0	1	25	5	+20	10	Qualified for Final Group
2	Casale	6	4	0	2	9	9	0	8	
3	Juventus	6	3	0	3	13	15	−2	6	
4	Venezia	6	0	0	6	4	22	−18	0	

Source: Panini

===== Results =====
Team 1	Score	Team 2
Genoa	4–0	Juventus
Casale	2–1	Venezia
Juventus	4–2	Casale
Venezia	0–3	Genoa
Genoa	3–0	Casale
Juventus	2 – 0 (F)	Venezia

Team 1	Score	Team 2
Juventus	2–5	Genoa
Venezia	0–1	Casale
Casale	2 – 0 (F)	Juventus
Genoa	9–1	Venezia
Casale	2–1	Genoa
Venezia	2–5	Juventus

==== Group B ====
===== Classification =====
Pos	Team	Pld	W	D	L	GF	GA	GD	Pts	Qualification
1	Milan	6	4	1	1	9	6	+3	9	Qualified for Final Group
2	Alessandria	6	3	1	2	7	5	+2	7	
3	Vigor Torino	6	2	0	4	9	10	−1	4	
3	Novara	6	2	0	4	9	13	−4	4	

Source: Panini

===== Results =====
Team 1	Score	Team 2
Alessandria	2–0	Vigor Torino
Novara	1–2	Milan
Milan	2–1	Alessandria
Vigor Torino	4–1	Novara
Alessandria	2 – 0 (F)	Novara
Milan	2 – 0 (F)	Vigor Torino

Team 1	Score	Team 2
Milan	2–1	Novara
Vigor Torino	0–1	Alessandria
Alessandria	0–0	Milan
Novara	3–2	Vigor Torino
Novara	3–1	Alessandria
Vigor Torino	3–1	Milan

==== Group C ====
===== Classification =====
Pos	Team	Pld	W	D	L	GF	GA	GD	Pts	Qualification
1	Torino	6	6	0	0	18	3	+15	12	Qualified for Final Group
2	Pro Vercelli	6	4	0	2	12	6	+6	8	
3	Hellas Verona	6	1	0	5	10	16	−6	2	
3	Como	6	1	0	5	4	19	−15	2	

Source: Panini

===== Results =====
Team 1	Score	Team 2
Pro Vercelli	5–0	Como
Torino	3–1	Hellas Verona
Como	1–5	Torino
Hellas Verona	2–3	Pro Vercelli
Como	3–0	Hellas Verona
Torino	3–0	Pro Vercelli

Team 1	Score	Team 2
Como	0–1	Pro Vercelli
Hellas Verona	1–4	Torino
Pro Vercelli	3–0	Hellas Verona
Torino	2 – 0 (F)	Como
Pro Vercelli	0–1	Torino
Hellas Verona	6–0	Como

==== Group D ====
===== Classification =====
Pos	Team	Pld	W	D	L	GF	GA	GD	Pts	Qualification
1	Internazionale	6	4	1	1	27	2	+25	9	Qualified for Final Round
2	Andrea Doria	6	3	1	2	11	10	+1	7	
3	Vicenza	6	2	1	3	8	23	−15	5	
3	Juventus Italia	6	1	1	4	6	17	−11	3	

Source: Panini

===== Results =====
Team 1	Score	Team 2
Internazionale	16–0	Vicenza
Juventus Italia	1–1	Andrea Doria
Andrea Doria	1–0	Internazionale
Juventus Italia	2 – 0 (F)	Vicenza
Juventus Italia	1–4	Internazionale
Vicenza	4–0	Andrea Doria

Team 1	Score	Team 2
Andrea Doria	4–2	Juventus Italia
Vicenza	0–0	Internazionale
Internazionale	3–0	Andrea Doria
Vicenza	4–0	Juventus Italia
Andrea Doria	4–0	Vicenza
Internazionale	2–0	Juventus Italia

=== Final round ===
==== Classification ====
Pos	Team	Pld	W	D	L	GF	GA	GD	Pts	Qualification
1	Genoa (C)	5	3	1	1	13	11	+2	7	Champions (officially after WWI)
2	Torino	5	1	3	1	11	7	+4	5	
2	Internazionale	5	2	1	2	11	12	−1	5	
4	Milan	5	0	3	2	4	9	−5	3	

Source: Panini
(C) Champions

==== Results table ====
Team 1	Score	Team 2
Milan	1–1	Genoa
Torino	2–2	Internazionale
Genoa	5–3	Internazionale
Milan	1–1	Torino
Internazionale	3–1	Milan
Torino	6–1	Genoa

Team 1	Score	Team 2
Genoa	3–0	Milan
Internazionale	2–1	Torino
Internazionale	1–3	Genoa
Torino	1–1	Milan
Genoa	–	Torino
Milan	–	Internazionale

== Southern Italy tournament ==
Central and Southern Italy Final Round was not played because Italy entered World War I on 24 May 1915. Consequently, the National Finals also were not be played.

== References and sources ==
- Almanacco Illustrato del Calcio – La Storia 1898–2004, Panini Edizioni, Modena, September 2005
