= Alessandro Rampini =

Italian footballer (1896-1995)

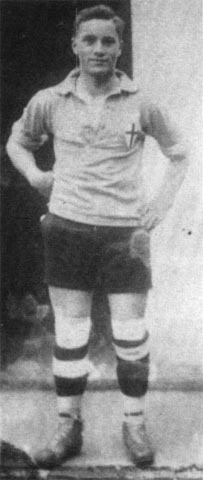

Personal information
- Full name: Alessandro Rampini
- Date of birth: 6 June 1896
- Place of birth: Caresana, Italy
- Date of death: 2 October 1995 (aged 99)
- Place of death: Borgo d'Ale, Italy
- Position: Forward

Senior career*
Years	Team	Apps	(Gls)
1910–1923	Pro Vercelli	91	(82)
1925–1926	Pro Vercelli	2	(1)

International career
1920	Italy	1	(0)
- * Club domestic league appearances and goals

Alessandro Rampini (Italian pronunciation: [alesˈsandro ramˈpiːni]; 6 June 1896 – 2 October 1995) was an Italian footballer who played as a forward. On 13 May 1920, he represented the Italy national football team on the occasion of a friendly match against the Netherlands in a 1–1 home draw. His brother Carlo Rampini was also a footballer for Pro Vercelli.

== Honours ==
=== Player ===
Pro Vercelli

- Italian Football Championship: 1920–21, 1921–22
