= 1909 Italian Championship of Football =

The Italian Championship was a secondary football tournament in 1909 Italy where foreign players were not allowed to play; the winners would be proclaimed Campioni Italiani (Italian Champions).

It remained meaningless after Pro Vercelli's victory of the 1909 Italian Football Championship using an all-Italian squad, and when it was boycotted by all major clubs it was consequently annulled by the Italian Football Federation.

== Italian Championship ==
=== Qualifications ===
Piedmont

- April 25: Juventus-Piemonte 1-0

Qualified: Juventus.

Lombardy

- According to La Stampa, a match was planned for March 28 but likely this match wasn't played for forfait of Milan. In fact, according to La Stampa in March 28 Milan played against Torino for the Palla Dapples (Dapples Ball) tournament, not in the Italian Championship against USM.

Liguria

- No matches

=== Semifinals ===
Played on May 9, 16 and 23.

Team 1	Agg.	Team 2	1st leg	2nd leg
Andrea Doria	5 - 5	Juventus	3 - 1	2 - 4
Vicenza	1 - 10	US Milanese	1 - 2	0 - 8

- Playoff (at Milan):
  - May 23, 1909: JUVENTUS - Andrea Doria 1 - 0 aet

=== Final ===
May 30 and June 6

Team 1	Agg.	Team 2	1st leg	2nd leg
Juventus	3 - 2	US Milanese	1 - 1	2 - 1

Italian Champions: Juventus.

Juventus won as a prize for the victory the Coppa Buni, while the title wasn't recognized by FIGC.

== References and sources ==
- Almanacco Illustrato del Calcio - La Storia 1898-2004, Panini Edizioni, Modena, September 2005
- Carlo Chiesa, La grande storia del calcio italiano, 2nd episode: Juve, scippati due titoli! Inter, l'atroce beffa (1908-1910, pp. 17–32, Guerin Sportivo #5 (May 2012).
- Online digitalized Archive of newspaper La Stampa of Turin.
