= Piemonte FC =

Italian football club

- Full name: Piemonte Football Club
- Nickname: Piemontini
- Founded: 1907; 119 years ago (refounded in 1916)
- Dissolved: 1914; 1921; 105 years ago
- League: Prima Categoria
- 1914–15: Prima Categoria, 5th
Home colours	Away colours

Piemonte Football Club was an Italian football team based in Turin that competed in the Prima Categoria for five seasons, which was the equivalent of today's Serie A. Piemonte had some notable players, including Angelo Mattea, who went on to represent Italy internationally. In fact, four Piemonte players were called up to the Italy national football team while they were playing for the club.

Despite having talented players, Piemonte Football Club did not achieve significant success and folded in 1914 and 1921.

== Results ==
- 1910–11 Prima Categoria: 7th in the Liguria-Lombardy-Piedmont division
- 1911–12 Prima Categoria: 10th in the Liguria-Lombardy-Piedmont division
- 1912–13 Prima Categoria: 4th in the Piedmont division
- 1913–14 Prima Categoria: 8th in the Liguria-Piedmont division
- 1914–15 Prima Categoria: 5th in Division B, Upper Italy
