= 1908 Italian Football Championship =

11th season of top-tier Italian football

Campionato Italiano di Prima Categoria
- Season: 1907–08
- Champions: Pro Vercelli; 1st title
- Top goalscorer: Mario Cagliani (4)

The 1908 Italian Football Championship was the 11th edition of the Italian Football Championship and the fifth since re-branding to Prima Categoria. Again the contest was made up of clubs exclusively from the 3 Northern Italian regions of Liguria, Lombardy and Piedmont. In the first of two highly political consecutive seasons of Italian football, two championships of Prima Categoria were played; one exclusively with Italian players and a competition deemed secondary that included non-Italians. The number of entrants in what was now the main contest went down from six the previous year to four. Two Piedmont teams played off to decide who played in the 3 club round robin final stage. Pro Vercelli won the Italian football championship for the 1st time.

== The two championships ==
Two championships were competed for that year:

1. Italian Championship, the main tournament where only Italian players were allowed to play; the winners were proclaimed Campioni d'Italia (Italian Champions). The winner was Pro Vercelli. They won as prize Coppa Buni.
2. Federal Championship, a secondary tournament where foreign players (if they lived in Italy) were also allowed to play; the winners would be proclaimed Campioni Federali (Federal Champions) The winner was Juventus. They did not though receive the Spensley Cup after the general boycott of the tournament.

Only Pro Vercelli's title is officially recognized by the Italian Football Federation. The Federal Championship won by Juventus was later annulled by FIGC, due to the boycott made by the "spurious international teams" (the clubs composed mostly of foreign players).

== Italian Championship statistics ==
=== Qualifications ===
==== Piedmont ====
Played on March 1 and 8

| Team 1 | Agg. | Team 2 | 1st leg | 2nd leg |
|---|---|---|---|---|
| Pro Vercelli | 3-1 | Juventus | 1-1 | 2-0 |

==== Liguria ====
Andrea Doria was the only registered team.

==== Lombardy ====
US Milanese was the only registered team.

=== Final round ===
==== Classification ====
| Pos | Team | Pld | W | D | L | GF | GA | GD | Pts | Qualification |
|---|---|---|---|---|---|---|---|---|---|---|
| 1 | Pro Vercelli (C) | 4 | 2 | 2 | 0 | 4 | 2 | +2 | 6 | Champions |
| 2 | US Milanese | 4 | 2 | 1 | 1 | 7 | 3 | +4 | 5 | |
| 3 | Andrea Doria | 4 | 0 | 1 | 3 | 4 | 10 | −6 | 1 | |

Source: Panini
(C) Champions

==== Results ====
| Team 1 | Score | Team 2 |
|---|---|---|
| US Milanese | 5-1 | Andrea Doria |
| Pro Vercelli | 0-0 | US Milanese |
| Andrea Doria | 1-2 | Pro Vercelli |
| Pro Vercelli | 1-1 | Andrea Doria |
| US Milanese | 0-1 | Pro Vercelli |
| Andrea Doria | 1-2 | US Milanese |

== Federal Championship ==
See main article, 1908 Italian Federal Football Championship.

== References and sources ==
- Almanacco Illustrato del Calcio - La Storia 1898-2004, Panini Edizioni, Modena, September 2005
- Carlo Chiesa, La grande storia del calcio italiano, 2nd episode: Juve, scippati due titoli! Inter, l'atroce beffa (1908-1910, pp. 17–32, Guerin Sportivo #5 (May 2012).
- Online digitalized Archive of newspaper La Stampa of Turin.
