= 1908 Italian Federal Football Championship =

The Federal Championship was a secondary football tournament in 1908 Italy where foreign players (if they lived in Italy) were also allowed to play; the winners would be proclaimed Campioni Federali (Federal Champions).

It was boycotted by all major clubs, and consequently later annulled by the Italian Football Federation.

== Federal Championship ==
Genoa and Torino didn't enter in the competition. Milan withdrew from the tournament on January 1, 1908, in order to protest against FIF.

Final

Played on January 19 and February 23

Team 1	Agg.	Team 2	1st leg	2nd leg
Andrea Doria	1–3	Juventus	0–3	1–0

Classification

Pos	Team	Pld	Won	Drw	Lst	Pts	GF	GA	GD	Notes
1	Juventus	2	1	0	1	2	3	1	+2	Champions; After playoff.
2	Andrea Doria	2	1	0	1	2	1	3	−2	Second place After playoff.

Playoff (Turin, March 16)

Team 1	Score	Team 2
Juventus	2–2	Andrea Doria

Cancelled and repeated for a mistake made by the referee during the match

Playoff (Torino, May 10)

Team 1	Score	Team 2
Juventus	5–1	Andrea Doria

- Juventus Federal Champions

Juventus didn't receive Coppa Spensley as prize because Milan, the club who won the Cup in 1906 and 1907, refused to give the Cup to Juventus and gave it to Spensley and Genoa in order to protest against FIF. In the Federal Assembly of 1908 FIF decided to assign permanently Spensley Cup to Milan.

== References and sources ==
- Almanacco Illustrato del Calcio – La Storia 1898–2004, Panini Edizioni, Modena, September 2005
- Carlo Chiesa, La grande storia del calcio italiano, 2nd episode: Juve, scippati due titoli! Inter, l'atroce beffa (1908–1910, pp. 17–32, Guerin Sportivo #5 (May 2012).
- Online digitalized Archive of newspaper La Stampa of Turin.
