= 1920–21 Prima Categoria =

20th season of top-tier Italian football

Prima Categoria
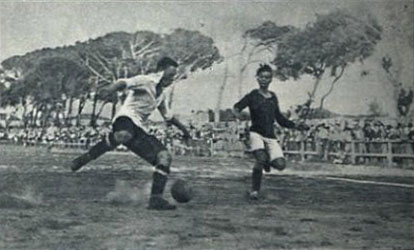
- Northern League Final
- Season: 1920–21
- Champions: Pro Vercelli; 6th title

The 1920-21 Prima Categoria season was the twentieth of the Italian Football Championship and the fourteenth since the re-brand to Prima Categoria. The 1920–21 Italian Football Championship was the sixth won by Pro Vercelli.

== Regulation ==
Struggles between minor and major clubs continued, more, they went out of control. The regional FAs expanded the championship to 64 clubs. The preliminary regional phase became the bulk of the tournament, with even sixteen matchdays and regular regional football champions, while the following national phase was reduced to a spring tournament of eight matchdays.

The main tournament was completely divided in five independent sections, and each region had its own football champions. The spots to the national championship were divided according to the agreements between the Regional FAs.

National championship was split in four groups of four clubs. Group winners advanced to the final four. The whole tournament could have twenty-two matchdays.

The experimental Southern groups had their own special regulations.

== Teams ==
Regional FAs agreed to expand the league to 64 clubs. They variously chose to promote, re-elect, or invite clubs to fill the spots they had been granted to.

== Pre-league qualifications ==
=== Liguria ===
==== Round 1 ====
Team 1	Score	Team 2
Rivarolese	2–1	Serenitas Genova
Rivarolese	2–1	Sestrese

==== Round 2 ====
Team 1	Score	Team 2
Sestrese	3–1	Serenitas Genova

=== Verdicts ===
Rivarolese and Sestrese were admitted to the 1a Categoria.

== Northern Italy ==
=== Qualifications ===
==== Liguria ====
===== Classification =====
Pos	Team	Pld	W	D	L	GF	GA	GD	Pts	Promotion or relegation
1	Andrea Doria	14	9	4	1	33	9	+24	22	Qualified
2	Genoa	14	8	3	3	23	8	+15	19	Qualified
3	Spezia	14	6	5	3	17	9	+8	17	Resigned from the FIGC
3	Savona	14	6	5	3	15	12	+3	17	Resigned from the FIGC
5	Sampierdarenese	14	7	2	5	17	15	+2	16	
6	SPES Genova	14	5	2	7	16	27	−11	12	
7	Sestrese	14	2	5	7	11	23	−12	9	
8	Rivarolese (T)	14	0	0	14	3	32	−29	0	Re-elected

Source: Panini
(T) Qualified, but not yet for the particular phase indicated
Notes:

Rivarolese was demoted by the Federazione Italiana Giuoco Calcio after incidents caused by its supporters during the match Rivarolese-Savona (0–2). Rivarolese's remaining matches were all considered forfeits. The side was readmitted to the championship for the following season.

===== Results table =====
Home \ Away	ADO	GEN	RIV	SAM	SVN	SES	SGE	SPE
Andrea Doria		2–0	3–1	1–0	2–0	6–1	3–0	1–1
Genoa	2–0		2–0 (Note: Rivarolese was demoted by the Federazione Italiana Giuoco Calcio after incidents caused by its supporters during the match Rivarolese-Savona (0–2). Rivarolese's rimaining matches were all considered forfeits. The side was readmitted to the championship for the following season.)	0–1	2–0	3–0	5–0	1–0
Rivarolese	0–2	0–2		1–4	0–2	0–2	0–2	0–2
Sampierdarenese	1–4	0–2	2–0		2–0	2–1	1–0	0–1
Savona	0–0	2–1	2–0	2–2		1–0	3–1	1–0
Sestrese	1–1	1–1	2–0	1–1	1–1		0–2	0–0
SPES Genova	1–7	1–1	2–0	0–1	1–1	3–1		2–0
Spezia	1–1	1–1	3–1	2–0	0–0	2–0	4–1	

Updated to match(es) played on unknown. Source: Almanacco Illustrato del Calcio – La Storia 1898–2004, Panini Edizioni, Modena, September 2005 (in Italian)
Legend: Blue = home team win; Yellow = draw; Red = away team win.

==== Piedmont ====
===== Group A =====
Classification

Pos	Team	Pld	W	D	L	GF	GA	GD	Pts	Promotion or relegation
1	Novara	10	7	2	1	31	8	+23	16	Qualified
2	Torino	10	7	2	1	25	12	+13	16	Qualified
3	US Torinese	10	6	1	3	26	15	+11	13	Qualification play-off
4	Juventus	10	4	3	3	27	14	+13	11	Resigned from the FIGC
5	Pastore Torino	10	1	1	8	10	33	−23	3	
6	Carignano (E)	10	0	1	9	5	42	−37	1	Disbanded

Source: Panini
(E) Eliminated

Results Table

Home \ Away	CRG	JUV	NOV	PAS	TOR	UST
Carignano		1–5	0–6	1–2	1–6	0–5
Juventus	7–1		1–1	5–0	2–2	2–2
Novara	4–0	3–0		2–0 (Note: Forfeit)	1–1	2–1
Pastore Torino	1–1	0–4	0–6		2–4	1–4
Torino	1–0	2–0	3–2	3–2		3–1
US Torinese	5–0	2–1	2–4	3–2	1–0	

Updated to match(es) played on unknown. Source: Almanacco Illustrato del Calcio – La Storia 1898–2004, Panini Edizioni, Modena, September 2005 (in Italian)
Legend: Blue = home team win; Yellow = draw; Red = away team win.
Notes:

Leadership playoff
Played on 13 March 1921 in Alessandria.

Team 1	Score	Team 2
Novara Calcio	2–0	Torino FC

===== Group B =====
Classification

Pos	Team	Pld	W	D	L	GF	GA	GD	Pts	Promotion or relegation
1	Alessandria	10	9	1	0	37	3	+34	19	Qualified
2	Pro Vercelli	10	6	1	3	24	10	+14	13	Qualified
3	Casale	10	6	0	4	18	10	+8	12	Qual.playoff (Resigned)
4	Biellese	10	5	1	4	16	18	−2	11	
5	Valenzana	10	2	1	7	12	25	−13	5	
6	Amatori Torino (E)	10	0	0	10	3	44	−41	0	Disbanded

Source: Panini
(E) Eliminated

Results Table

Home \ Away	ALE	AMT	BIE	CSL	PVE	VAL
Alessandria		13–0	2–0 (Note: Forfeit)	3–1	1–0	5–0
Amatori Torino	0–2		0–2	0–5	1–4	2–4
Biellese	1–6	5–0		2–1	2–0	3–1
Casale	1–2	2–0	3–0		2–0	1–0
Pro Vercelli	0–0	4–0	5–1	2–0		6–1
Valenzana	0–3	3–0	0–0	1–2	2–3	

Updated to match(es) played on unknown. Source: Almanacco Illustrato del Calcio – La Storia 1898–2004, Panini Edizioni, Modena, September 2005 (in Italian)
Legend: Blue = home team win; Yellow = draw; Red = away team win.

===== Qualification playoff =====
Played on 20 February 1921 in Vercelli.

Team 1	Score	Team 2
Casale	0–0 (a.e.t.)	US Torinese

Repetition
Played on 20 March 1921 in Vercelli.

Team 1	Score	Team 2
Casale	0–2	US Torinese

US Torinese qualified for the Northern Italy semifinals. Casale resigned from the FIGC.

===== Regional final =====
Played on 20 March 1921 in Turin.

Team 1	Score	Team 2
US Alessandria	2–0	Novara

- Alessandria Champions of Piedmont 1921

==== Lombardy ====
===== Group A =====
Classification

Pos	Team	Pld	W	D	L	GF	GA	GD	Pts	Promotion or relegation
1	Internazionale	6	6	0	0	47	8	+39	12	Qualified
2	Casteggio	6	3	1	2	18	12	+6	7	
3	GC Legnanesi (E)	6	2	1	3	16	20	−4	5	Merged with Legnano
4	Ausonia Pro Gorla (E)	6	0	0	6	1	42	−41	0	Disbanded

Source: Panini
(E) Eliminated

Results Table

Home \ Away	AUS	CST	GCL	INT
Ausonia Pro Gorla		1–2	0–7	0–14
Casteggio	5–0		2–2	3–4
GC Legnanesi	5–0	0–3		2–3
Internazionale	9–0	5–3	12–0	

Updated to match(es) played on unknown. Source: Almanacco Illustrato del Calcio – La Storia 1898–2004, Panini Edizioni, Modena, September 2005 (in Italian)
Legend: Blue = home team win; Yellow = draw; Red = away team win.

===== Group B =====
Classification

Pos	Team	Pld	W	D	L	GF	GA	GD	Pts	Promotion or relegation
1	Milan	6	5	1	0	21	5	+16	11	Qualified
2	Pro Patria	6	4	0	2	10	10	0	8	
3	Cremonese	6	2	1	3	9	9	0	5	
4	Monza (T)	6	0	0	6	2	18	−16	0	Saved

Source: Panini
(T) Qualified, but not yet for the particular phase indicated

Results Table

Home \ Away	CRE	MIL	MON	PPA
Cremonese		1–2	4–0	1–2
Milan	2–2		5–0	7–1
Monza	0–1	1–4		0–2
Pro Patria	3–0	0–1	2–1	

Updated to match(es) played on unknown. Source: Almanacco Illustrato del Calcio – La Storia 1898–2004, Panini Edizioni, Modena, September 2005 (in Italian)
Legend: Blue = home team win; Yellow = draw; Red = away team win.

===== Group C =====
Classification

Pos	Team	Pld	W	D	L	GF	GA	GD	Pts	Promotion or relegation
1	US Milanese	6	6	0	0	24	4	+20	12	Qualified
2	Pavia	6	4	0	2	11	6	+5	8	
3	Varese	6	1	0	5	4	14	−10	2	Relegation play-off
4	Pro Sesto (E)	6	1	0	5	6	21	−15	2	Disbanded

Source: Panini
(E) Eliminated

Results Table

Home \ Away	PAV	PSE	USM	VAR
Pavia		2–0	0–1	3–0
Pro Sesto	2–3		2–12	1–0
US Milanese	2–1	2–0		4–1
Varese	1–2	2–1	0–3	

Updated to match(es) played on unknown. Source: Almanacco Illustrato del Calcio – La Storia 1898–2004, Panini Edizioni, Modena, September 2005 (in Italian)
Legend: Blue = home team win; Yellow = draw; Red = away team win.

Relegation playoff
Played on 5 December 1920 in Busto Arsizio.

Team 1	Score	Team 2
Pro Sesto	1–2 (a.e.t.)	Varese

===== Group D =====
Classification

Pos	Team	Pld	W	D	L	GF	GA	GD	Pts	Promotion or relegation
1	Legnano	6	4	2	0	17	3	+14	10	Qualified
2	Como	6	3	2	1	12	10	+2	8	
3	Chiasso	6	1	1	4	7	14	−7	3	Relegation play-off
4	Stelvio (T)	6	0	3	3	4	13	−9	3	Saved

Source: Panini
(T) Qualified, but not yet for the particular phase indicated

Results Table

Home \ Away	CHI	COM	LEG	STE
Chiasso		0–3	0–4	3–0
Como	3–2		1–1	3–0
Legnano	3–1	5–0		3–0
Stelvio	1–1	2–2	1–1	

Updated to match(es) played on unknown. Source: Almanacco Illustrato del Calcio – La Storia 1898–2004, Panini Edizioni, Modena, September 2005 (in Italian)
Legend: Blue = home team win; Yellow = draw; Red = away team win.

Relegation playoff
Played on 5 December 1920 in Saronno.

Team 1	Score	Team 2
Chiasso	2–0	Stelvio

The match was voided due to irregularities.

Repetition
Played on 19 December 1920 in Saronno.

Team 1	Score	Team 2
Chiasso	1–0	Stelvio

===== Group E =====
Classification

Pos	Team	Pld	W	D	L	GF	GA	GD	Pts	Promotion or relegation
1	Saronno	6	4	1	1	12	7	+5	9	Qualified
2	A.C. Libertas	6	2	2	2	12	9	+3	6	
3	Brescia	6	2	2	2	10	9	+1	6	Resigned from the FIGC
4	Atalanta (T)	6	1	1	4	6	15	−9	3	Saved

Source: Panini
(T) Qualified, but not yet for the particular phase indicated

Results Table

Home \ Away	ATA	BRE	ACL	SAR
Atalanta		1–1	1–0	1–2
Brescia	3–2		1–1	3–1
A.C. Libertas	7–1	2–1		1–4
Saronno	2–0	2–1	1–1	

Updated to match(es) played on unknown. Source: Almanacco Illustrato del Calcio – La Storia 1898–2004, Panini Edizioni, Modena, September 2005 (in Italian)
Legend: Blue = home team win; Yellow = draw; Red = away team win.

===== Group F =====
Classification

Pos	Team	Pld	W	D	L	GF	GA	GD	Pts	Promotion or relegation
1	Trevigliese	6	5	0	1	13	7	+6	10	Qualified
2	Juventus Italia	6	4	0	2	16	9	+7	8	
3	Nazionale Lombardia (E)	6	2	0	4	11	20	−9	4	Disbanded
4	Enotria Goliardo (T)	6	1	0	5	12	16	−4	2	Saved

Source: Panini
(E) Eliminated; (T) Qualified, but not yet for the particular phase indicated

Results Table

Home \ Away	ENO	JIT	NLO	TVG
Enotria Goliardo		0–1	2–3	1–2
Juventus Italia	4–2		7–0	2–1
Nazionale Lombardia	3–6	3–1		2–3
Trevigliese	3–1	3–1	1–0	

Updated to match(es) played on unknown. Source: Almanacco Illustrato del Calcio – La Storia 1898–2004, Panini Edizioni, Modena, September 2005 (in Italian)
Legend: Blue = home team win; Yellow = draw; Red = away team win.

===== Final round =====
Classification

Pos	Team	Pld	W	D	L	GF	GA	GD	Pts	Promotion or relegation
1	Legnano	10	8	1	1	22	9	+13	17	Qualified
2	Internazionale	10	6	4	0	26	8	+18	16	Qualified
3	US Milanese	10	5	1	4	15	14	+1	11	Qualified
4	Milan	10	3	2	5	14	11	+3	8	Qualified
5	Saronno	10	3	0	7	14	30	−16	6	
6	Trevigliese	10	1	0	9	9	28	−19	2	

Source: Panini

Results Table

Home \ Away	INT	LEG	MIL	SAR	TVG	USM
Internazionale		4–1	0–0	5–1	4–0	2–1
Legnano	1–1		1–0	4–1	6–2	4–0
Milan	1–1	1–2		2–3	1–0	0–1
Saronno	0–4	0–1	1–7		5–1	0–2
Trevigliese	1–3	0–1	1–2	2–0 (Note: Forfeit)		1–2
US Milanese	2–2	0–1	1–0	2–3	4–1	

Updated to match(es) played on unknown. Source: Almanacco Illustrato del Calcio – La Storia 1898–2004, Panini Edizioni, Modena, September 2005 (in Italian)
Legend: Blue = home team win; Yellow = draw; Red = away team win.

==== Veneto ====
===== Group A =====
Classification

Pos	Team	Pld	W	D	L	GF	GA	GD	Pts	Promotion or relegation
1	Petrarca Padova	8	5	3	0	21	5	+16	13	Qualified
2	Bentegodi Verona	8	5	2	1	20	9	+11	12	Qualified
3	Venezia	8	3	3	2	12	7	+5	9	Resigned from the FIGC
4	Udinese	8	1	3	4	10	20	−10	5	
5	Treviso	8	0	1	7	5	27	−22	1	Relegation playoff

Source: Panini

Results Table

- The home teams are read down the left hand side while the away teams are indicated along the top.

Home \ Away	BEN	PET	TRV	UDI	VEN
Bentegodi Verona		2–2	2–1	5–0	1–1
Petrarca Padova	3–1		6–0	4–0	1–1
Treviso	1–6	0–2		2–5	0–2
Udinese	1–2	1–1	1–1		1–1
Venezia	0–1	0–2	3–0	4–1	

Updated to match(es) played on unknown. Source: Almanacco Illustrato del Calcio – La Storia 1898–2004, Panini Edizioni, Modena, September 2005 (in Italian)
Legend: Blue = home team win; Yellow = draw; Red = away team win.

===== Group B =====
Classification

Pos	Team	Pld	W	D	L	GF	GA	GD	Pts	Promotion or relegation
1	Hellas Verona	8	6	1	1	19	7	+12	13	Qualified
2	Padova	8	5	2	1	19	8	+11	12	Qualified
3	Vicenza	8	4	2	2	11	8	+3	10	Resigned from the FIGC
4	Schio	8	1	2	5	8	15	−7	4	
5	Dolo (R)	8	0	1	7	8	27	−19	1	Relegated

Source: Panini
(R) Relegated

Results Table

- The home teams are read down the left hand side while the away teams are indicated along the top.

Home \ Away	DOL	HEL	PAD	SCH	VIC
Dolo		3–4	1–5 (Note: Dolo-Padova was suspended due to lack of footballs. FIGC decided to confirm the result obtained at the time of the suspension.)	0–0	1–2
Hellas Verona	6–0		1–1	4–1	1–0
Padova	3–2	2–0		4–0	1–2
Schio	5–0	0–1	1–2		0–0
Vicenza	2–1	0–2	1–1	4–1	

Updated to match(es) played on unknown. Source: Almanacco Illustrato del Calcio – La Storia 1898–2004, Panini Edizioni, Modena, September 2005 (in Italian)
Legend: Blue = home team win; Yellow = draw; Red = away team win.

===== Relegation playoff =====
Played on 27 February 1921 in Padua.

Team 1	Score	Team 2
Treviso	5–1	Dolo

===== Final round =====
Classification

Pos	Team	Pld	W	D	L	GF	GA	GD	Pts	Promotion or relegation
1	Padova	6	3	2	1	10	5	+5	8	Qualified
2	Bentegodi Verona	6	2	3	1	12	9	+3	7	Qualified
3	Hellas Verona	6	2	2	2	7	9	−2	6	Resigned from the FIGC
4	Petrarca Padova	6	1	1	4	9	15	−6	3	

Source: Panini

Results Table

- The home teams are read down the left hand side while the away teams are indicated along the top.

Home \ Away	BEN	HEL	PAD	PET
Bentegodi Verona		1–1	2–2	4–4
Hellas Verona	2–2		2–1	3–0
Padova	0–2 (Note: Forfeit)	1–1		4–4
Petrarca Padova	0–2	3–0	0–3	

Updated to match(es) played on unknown. Source: Almanacco Illustrato del Calcio – La Storia 1898–2004, Panini Edizioni, Modena, September 2005 (in Italian)
Legend: Blue = home team win; Yellow = draw; Red = away team win.

==== Emilia ====
===== Group A =====
Classification

Pos	Team	Pld	W	D	L	GF	GA	GD	Pts	Promotion or relegation
1	Modena	8	6	1	1	28	7	+21	13	Qualified
2	Parma	8	5	1	2	27	13	+14	11	Qualification play-off
3	Piacenza	8	3	3	2	19	18	+1	9	
4	Reggiana	8	1	2	5	7	29	−22	4	
5	Carpi	8	1	1	6	14	28	−14	3	Relegation playoff

Source: Panini

Results table

Home \ Away	CAR	MOD	PAR	PIA	REG
Carpi	—	1–2	1–3	1–6	7–0
Modena	6–0	—	3–0	3–0	6–0
Parma	6–0	4–1	—	4–1	5–1
Piacenza	4–3	2–2	3–3	—	2–1
Reggiana	1–1	0–5	3–2	1–1	—

Legend: Blue = home team win; Yellow = draw; Red = away team win.

===== Group B =====
Classification

Pos	Team	Pld	W	D	L	GF	GA	GD	Pts	Promotion or relegation
1	Bologna	8	7	1	0	25	5	+20	15	Qualified
2	Mantova	8	4	2	2	13	8	+5	10	Qualification play-off
3	SPAL	8	2	3	3	6	14	−8	7	
4	Virtus GS Bolognese	8	2	1	5	8	15	−7	5	
5	Nazionale Emilia (R)	8	1	1	6	6	16	−10	3	Relegated, resigned

Source: Panini
(R) Relegated

Results table

Home \ Away	BOL	MAN	NAZ	SPA	VIR
Bologna	—	2–1	4–1	6–0	2–1
Mantova	1–1	—	1–0	1–1	4–1
Nazionale Emilia	1–4	2–0	—	1–1	1–3
SPAL	0–3	0–2	2–0	—	1–0
Virtus GS Bolognese	0–3	1–3	1–0	1–1	—

Legend: Blue = home team win; Yellow = draw; Red = away team win.

===== Regional Finals =====
Played on 6 February and 13 March 1921 to determine Emilia's regional champion.

Team 1	Agg.	Team 2	1st leg	2nd leg
Bologna	10–2	Modena	10–1	0–1

Since the aggregate rule wasn't applied, a tie-breaker was needed.

Tie-breaker
Played on 3 April 1921 in Ferrara.

Team 1	Score	Team 2
Bologna	1–0 (a.e.t.)	Modena

===== Qualification play-off =====
Played on 2 and 20 February 1921.

Team 1	Agg.	Team 2	1st leg	2nd leg
Parma	0–5	Mantova	0–1	0–4

===== Relegation playoff =====
Played on ? in ?.

Team 1	Score	Team 2
Carpi	?–?	Nazionale Emilia

=== Semifinals ===
==== Group A ====
===== Classification =====
Pos	Team	Pld	W	D	L	GF	GA	GD	Pts	Promotion or relegation
1	Bologna	6	4	2	0	13	4	+9	10	Qualified
2	Genoa	6	2	3	1	10	9	+1	7	Resigned from the FIGC
3	Novara	6	2	2	2	7	7	0	6	Resigned from the FIGC
4	Milan	6	0	1	5	8	18	−10	1	Resigned from the FIGC

Source: Panini

===== Results table =====
Home \ Away	BOL	GEN	MIL	NOV
Bologna	—	1–1	2–0	3–1
Genoa	1–2	—	4–3	1–1
Milan	1–5	2–2	—	2–3
Novara	0–0	0–1	2–0	—

Legend: Blue = home team win; Yellow = draw; Red = away team win.

==== Group B ====
===== Classification =====
Pos	Team	Pld	W	D	L	GF	GA	GD	Pts	Promotion or relegation
1	Alessandria	6	4	0	2	17	5	+12	8	Qualification play-off
2	Modena	6	4	0	2	7	8	−1	8	Resigned from the FIGC
3	Andrea Doria	6	3	0	3	6	5	+1	6	Resigned from the FIGC
4	US Milanese	6	1	0	5	4	16	−12	2	Resigned from the FIGC

Source: Panini

===== Results table =====
Home \ Away	ALE	ADO	MOD	USM
Alessandria	—	2–1	5–1	8–0
Andrea Doria	1–0	—	2–0	2–1
Modena	1–0	1–0	—	2–1
US Milanese	1–2	1–0	0–2	—

Legend: Blue = home team win; Yellow = draw; Red = away team win.

===== Qualification playoff =====
Played on 3 July 1921 in Milan.

Team 1	Score	Team 2
Alessandria	4–0	Modena

==== Group C ====
===== Classification =====
Pos	Team	Pld	W	D	L	GF	GA	GD	Pts	Promotion or relegation
2	Torino	6	4	0	2	13	10	+3	8	Qualification play-off
2	Legnano	6	4	0	2	10	8	+2	8	Resigned from the FIGC
3	Padova	6	2	0	4	9	10	−1	4	Resigned from the FIGC
3	Mantova	6	2	0	4	7	11	−4	4	Resigned from the FIGC

Source: Panini

===== Results table =====
Home \ Away	LEG	MAN	PAD	TOR
Legnano	—	3–0	2–0	3–2
Mantova	2–0	—	3–2	1–3
Padova	0–1	2–1	—	4–1
Torino	4–1	1–0	2–1	—

Legend: Blue = home team win; Yellow = draw; Red = away team win.

===== Qualification play-off =====
Played on 26 June 1921 in Vercelli.

Team 1	Score	Team 2
Legnano	1–1 (a.e.t.)	Torino

A tie-breaker was due, but both Legnano and Torino decided to retire from the championship and to resign from the FIGC.

==== Group D ====
===== Classification =====
Pos	Team	Pld	W	D	L	GF	GA	GD	Pts	Promotion or relegation
1	Pro Vercelli	6	5	0	1	13	4	+9	10	Qualified
2	US Torinese	6	4	1	1	14	6	+8	9	
3	Internazionale	6	1	1	4	8	13	−5	3	Resigned from the FIGC
4	Bentegodi Verona	6	1	0	5	4	16	−12	2	

Source: Panini

===== Results table =====
Home \ Away	BEN	INT	PRO	UST
Bentegodi Verona	—	2–0 (Note: Forfeit)	1–4	0–1
Internazionale	4–1	—	0–2	4–4
Pro Vercelli	3–0	2–0	—	2–0
US Torinese	4–0	2–0	3–0	—

Legend: Blue = home team win; Yellow = draw; Red = away team win.

=== Finals ===
==== Round 1 ====
Played on 10 July 1921 in Turin.

Team 1	Score	Team 2
Alessandria	0–4	Pro Vercelli

Bologna F.C. advanced directly to Round 2 due to Torino and Legnano's retirement. Alessandria resigned from the FIGC.

==== Round 2 ====
Played on 17 July 1921 in Livorno.

Team 1	Score	Team 2
Bologna	1–2 (a.e.t.)	Pro Vercelli

Bologna resigned from the FIGC.

== Southern Italy tournament ==
An experimental amatorial tournament was played in Southern Italy.

=== Final round ===
Played on 3 July 1921 in Bologna.

Team 1	Score	Team 2
Livorno	0–1	Pisa

Livorno resigned from the FIGC.

== National final ==
Played on 24 July 1921 in Turin.

Team 1	Score	Team 2
Pro Vercelli	2–1	Pisa

Both teams resigned from the FIGC.

== References and sources ==
- Almanacco Illustrato del Calcio – La Storia 1898–2004, Panini Edizioni, Modena, September 2005
