= 1911–12 Prima Categoria =

15th season of top-tier Italian football

Prima Categoria
- Season: 1911–12
- Champions: Pro Vercelli; 4th title
- Top goalscorer: Carlo Rampini (28)

The 1911-12 Prima Categoria was the fifteenth edition of the Italian Football Championship and the ninth since the re-brand to Prima Categoria. Champions for the fourth time in five seasons (punctuated only by their protest two season previous), were Pro Vercelli.

== Format ==
The competition was expanded by one to 14 Northern Italian clubs. Two regional round robin tournaments took place, with the winner of each of those then playing-off in a final.

== Pre-league qualifications ==
Played on 24 and 27 September 1911.

Team 1	Agg.	Team 2	1st leg	2nd leg
Casale	2–1	Racing Libertas Milan	1–1	1–0

Casale was admitted to the 1a Categoria Italian Championship.

== Main tournament ==
=== Classification ===
Pos	Team	Pld	W	D	L	GF	GA	GD	Pts	Qualification or relegation
1	Pro Vercelli	18	15	2	1	50	12	+38	32	Qualified for the National Final
2	Milan	18	14	3	1	60	10	+50	31	
3	Genoa	18	10	4	4	35	21	+14	24	
4	Internazionale	18	10	1	7	42	22	+20	21	
4	Torino	18	10	1	7	31	31	0	21	
6	Casale	18	6	3	9	19	26	−7	15	
6	Andrea Doria	18	7	1	10	24	37	−13	15	
8	Juventus	18	3	3	12	22	47	−25	9	
9	US Milanese	18	3	2	13	18	52	−34	8	
10	Piemonte	18	1	2	15	16	59	−43	4	

=== Results table ===
Home \ Away	ADO	CSL	GEN	INT	JUV	MIL	PIE	PVE	TOR	USM
Andrea Doria		2–1	1–2	0–2	1–0	0–4	8–0	0–2	3–1	4–2
Casale	3–0		0–1	0–3	2–0	0–1	2–0	1–2	2–2	2–0
Genoa	1–1	1–1		3–2	2–0	1–0	5–1	0–1	2–2	3–2
Internazionale	4–0	0–1	1–3		6–1	0–3	5–1	2–1	1–1	2–0
Juventus	4–0	2–2	1–5	0–4		0–4	5–2	1–3	1–1	1–1
Milan	4–0	6–0	1–0	2–1	8–1		1–1	2–2	3–1	6–0
Piemonte	1–2	2–1	0–2	1–2	1–4	0–3		1–6	1–2	1–1
Pro Vercelli	3–0	3–0	2–0	3–1	1–0	1–1	4–2		1–0	3–0
Torino	2–0	1–0	2–2	2–1	2–1	1–6	3–0	1–5		6–2
US Milanese	1–2	0–1	3–2	0–5	2–0	1–5	3–1	0–7	0–1	

Updated to match(es) played on unknown. Source: Almanacco Illustrato del Calcio - La Storia 1898-2004, Panini Edizioni, Modena, September 2005 (in Italian)
Legend: Blue = home team win; Yellow = draw; Red = away team win.

== Veneto-Emilia test group ==
=== Classification ===
Pos	Team	Pld	W	D	L	GF	GA	GD	Pts	Qualification or relegation
1	Venezia	6	3	1	2	8	12	−4	7	Qualified for the National Final
2	Vicenza	6	3	0	3	10	7	+3	6	
2	Hellas Verona	6	2	2	2	9	9	0	6	
4	Bologna	6	2	1	3	10	9	+1	5	

=== Results table ===
Home \ Away	BOL	HEL	VEN	VIC
Bologna		2–2	3–0	3–2
Hellas Verona	2–1		1–1	2–1
Venezia	2–1	3–2		1–0
Vicenza	1–0	1–0	5–1	

Updated to match(es) played on unknown. Source: Almanacco Illustrato del Calcio - La Storia 1898-2004, Panini Edizioni, Modena, September 2005 (in Italian)
Legend: Blue = home team win; Yellow = draw; Red = away team win.

== Final ==
Played on April 28 and May 5.

Team 1	Agg.	Team 2	1st leg	2nd leg
Venezia	0–13	Pro Vercelli	0–6	0–7

== References and sources ==
- Almanacco Illustrato del Calcio - La Storia 1898-2004, Panini Edizioni, Modena, September 2005
