= 1910–11 Prima Categoria =

14th season of top-tier Italian football

Prima Categoria
- Season: 1910–11
- Champions: Pro Vercelli; 3rd title

The 1910-11 Prima Categoria season was the fourteenth of the Italian Football Championship and the eighth since the re-brand to Prima Categoria. Champions for the third time in four season and regaining the title after their protest the season before were Pro Vercelli.

== Regulation ==
The quality committee accepted a third Turinese club, Piedmont FC. The FIGC organized a test group in the Northeast with four clubs. The competition was expanded to 13 clubs to include for the first time, clubs from outside the Liguria, Lombardy, Piedmont triangle. To accommodate the newly admitted teams from the North East, 2 regional round robin tournaments took place. The winner of each of those then played off in a final.

== Main tournament ==
=== Classification ===
Pos	Team	Pld	W	D	L	GF	GA	GD	Pts	Qualification or relegation
1	Pro Vercelli	16	12	3	1	44	8	+36	27	Qualified for the National Final
2	Milan	16	10	2	4	44	19	+25	22	
3	Torino	16	9	0	7	33	27	+6	18	
4	Andrea Doria	16	8	0	8	28	30	−2	16	
5	Genoa	16	7	0	9	22	27	−5	14	
6	Internazionale	16	6	1	9	24	31	−7	13	
7	Piemonte	16	4	4	8	21	35	−14	12	
7	US Milanese	16	6	0	10	19	45	−26	12	
9	Juventus	16	3	4	9	16	29	−13	10	

Source: Panini

=== Results table ===
Home \ Away	ADO	GEN	INT	JUV	MIL	PIE	PVE	TOR	USM
Andrea Doria		2–3	3–0	0–2	1–7	3–1	0–2	3–2	3–0
Genoa	1–2		1–0	3–0	0–3	2–1	0–1	1–2	3–1
Internazionale	1–2	0–3		1–1	0–2	4–2	0–3	0–1	5–1
Juventus	4–2	4–0	0–2		0–2	1–1	0–4	1–3	0–1
Milan	0–1	2–0	6–3	3–0		7–1	0–0	5–2	0–2
Piemonte	2–1	1–0	2–3	1–1	0–0		2–2	2–4	1–0
Pro Vercelli	3–1	6–0	4–0	0–0	1–0	3–0		3–1	7–2
Torino	2–1	1–5	0–1	2–1	5–1	1–2	2–0		5–0
US Milanese	0–3	1–0	0–4	4–1	3–6	3–2	0–5	1–0	

Updated to match(es) played on unknown. Source: Almanacco Illustrato del Calcio - La Storia 1898-2004, Panini Edizioni, Modena, September 2005 (in Italian)
Legend: Blue = home team win; Yellow = draw; Red = away team win.

== Veneto-Emilia test group ==
=== Classification ===
Pos	Team	Pld	W	D	L	GF	GA	GD	Pts	Qualification or relegation
1	Vicenza	6	6	0	0	21	3	+18	12	Qualified for the National Final
2	Hellas Verona	6	4	0	2	13	12	+1	8	
3	Bologna	6	2	0	4	11	20	−9	4	
4	Venezia	6	0	0	6	2	12	−10	0	

=== Results table ===
Home \ Away	BOL	HEL	VEN	VIC
Bologna		2–4	3–0	0–4
Hellas Verona	4–1		2–0	0–2
Venezia	2–4	0–1		0–1
Vicenza	6–1	7–2	1–0	

Updated to match(es) played on unknown. Source: Almanacco Illustrato del Calcio - La Storia 1898-2004, Panini Edizioni, Modena, September 2005 (in Italian)
Legend: Blue = home team win; Yellow = draw; Red = away team win.

== Final ==
Played on June 11 and 18.

Team 1	Agg.	Team 2	1st leg	2nd leg
Pro Vercelli	5–1	Vicenza	3–0	2–1

== References and sources ==
- Almanacco Illustrato del Calcio - La Storia 1898-2004, Panini Edizioni, Modena, September 2005
