= 1909 Italian Football Championship =

1909 Italian football season

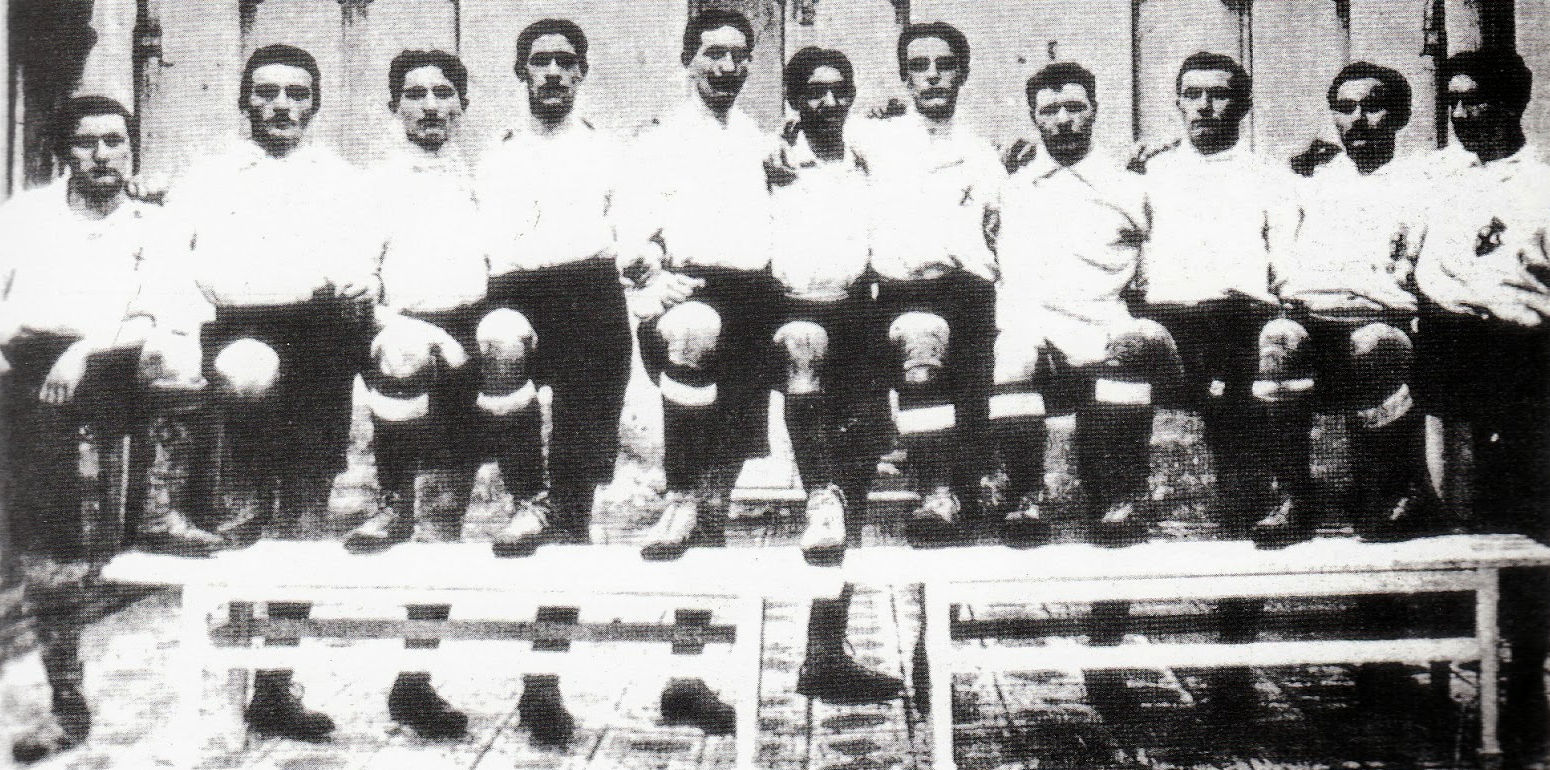
- 1909 Pro Vercelli's squad
- Season: 1908–09
- Champions: Pro Vercelli; 2nd title
- Top goalscorer: Amilcare Pizzi (9)

The 1909 Italian Football Championship was the 12th Italian Football Championship and the sixth since re-branding to Prima Categoria. Again the contest was made up of clubs exclusively from the 3 Northern Italian regions of Liguria, Lombardy and Piedmont. In the second of two highly political consecutive seasons of Italian football, two championships of Prima Categoria were played; one exclusively with Italian players and a competition (deemed secondary the season before), that included non-Italians. However, political manoeuvring by the clubs with foreign players meant that this season, the competition with foreign players was ultimately deemed more important. Hence the 1909 Italian Football Championship is officially recognised as won by Pro Vercelli who won the competition that included non-Italian players. That is despite that the previous season they are also recognised as champions, having won the competition that year that featured only Italian players.

The number of entrants in what is now viewed as the main contest doubled from the previous year to eight.

== The two championships ==
In this season, as in the previous one, two championships of Prima Categoria were played:

1. Italian Championship, the second edition of the tournament in which only Italian players were allowed to play; the winners would be proclaimed Campioni Italiani (Italian Champions). The winner was Juventus. They won as a prize the Coppa Buni.
2. Federal Championship, the first tournament where foreign players (if they lived in Italy) were also allowed to play; the winners would be proclaimed Campioni Federali (Federal Champions) The winner was Pro Vercelli. They won as a prize the Coppa Oberti.

However, the "spurious international teams" (the clubs composed mostly of foreign players), adversing the autarchical policy of the FIF, withdrew from Italian Championship. That was to make the Federal competition the most important of the two. Further, Pro Vercelli's all Italian squad won the Federal Championship against teams that featured non-Italian players. Italian Championship winners, Juventus, were soon eliminated from the Federal Championship. This de-valued the Italian Championship into a meaningless tournament. The dissenters' strategy worked; the failure of the Italian Championship won by Juventus forced the Federation to later recognise the Federal Champions of Pro Vercelli as "Campioni d'Italia 1909", disavowing the other tournament.

== Federal Championship ==
=== Qualifications ===
==== Liguria ====
Played on 17 January and 7 February

Team 1	Agg.	Team 2	1st leg	2nd leg
Andrea Doria	4-4	Genoa	1-1	3-3

Tie-break
Played on 21 February on neutral ground

Team 1	Score	Team 2
Andrea Doria	1-2	Genoa

==== Lombardy ====
Classification

Pos	Team	Pld	W	D	L	GF	GA	GD	Pts	Qualification
1	US Milanese	2	2	0	0	5	1	+4	4	Qualified for Semi-Finals
2	Milan	2	1	0	1	3	4	−1	2	
3	Internazionale	2	0	0	2	2	5	−3	0	

Source: Panini

Results
Played on 10, 17 and 24 January

Team 1	Score	Team 2
Milan	3-2	Internazionale
US Milanese	3-1	Milan
Internazionale	0-2	US Milanese

==== Piedmont ====
===== Round 1 =====
Played on 10 and 17 January

Team 1	Agg.	Team 2	1st leg	2nd leg
Juventus	3-2	Torino	0-1	3-1

Because both teams won a match (aggregate total was not applied), a tie break was needed.

Repetition
Played on 24 January on Juventus ground

Team 1	Score	Team 2
Juventus	0-1	Torino

Torino advanced to Round 2.

===== Round 2 =====
Played on 7 February and 14 March

Team 1	Agg.	Team 2	1st leg	2nd leg
Pro Vercelli	3-1	Torino	2-1	1-0

==== Veneto ====
Venezia was the only registered team.

=== Semifinals ===
==== Lombardy-Veneto ====
Played on 21 February and 28 March

Team 1	Agg.	Team 2	1st leg	2nd leg
Venezia	3-18	US Milanese	1-7	2-11

==== Piedmont-Liguria ====
Played on 21 and 28 March

Team 1	Agg.	Team 2	1st leg	2nd leg
Pro Vercelli	4-3	Genoa	3-2	1-1

=== Final ===
Played on 4 and 25 April

Team 1	Agg.	Team 2	1st leg	2nd leg
Pro Vercelli	4-2	US Milanese	2-0	2-2

== Italian Championship ==
- 1909 Italian Championship of Football

== References and sources ==
- Almanacco Illustrato del Calcio - La Storia 1898-2004, Panini Edizioni, Modena, September 2005
- Carlo Chiesa, La grande storia del calcio italiano Chapter 2: Juve, scippati due titoli! Inter, l'atroce beffa (1908-1910), pp. 17–32, Guerin Sportivo #5, May 2012.
- Digitalized online archive of Turin newspaper La Stampa.
