= AS Petrarca Calcio =

Italian football club

Petrarca Calcio
- Full name: Associazione Sportiva Petrarca Calcio
- Founded: 1910
- Dissolved: 2016
Home colours	Away colours

Associazione Sportiva Petrarca Calcio was an Italian football club based in Padua, Veneto. The club was formed in 1910. The team's colors were black and white. They have played at the first level before the single table was instated.

== History ==
Together with Calcio Padova was the main football team in Padua. The Petrarca, in the late teen years, was the main rival of the most glorious Calcio Padova. For a short period of time is even allowed to buy also some of the strongest players at the city level. Regularly affiliated with the Football Association, played at the Stadium Tre Pini of Padua. The team colors were black and white. In the 1922 season even came close to winning the Scudetto. Indeed, it was eliminated from Novese.

It played its last season in 2015–16 in Prima Categoria Veneto Girone E, arriving to the 12th place, then it was disbanded.
