= Vercelli =

Vercelli Vërsèj (Piedmontese)
- Comune
- Città di Vercelli
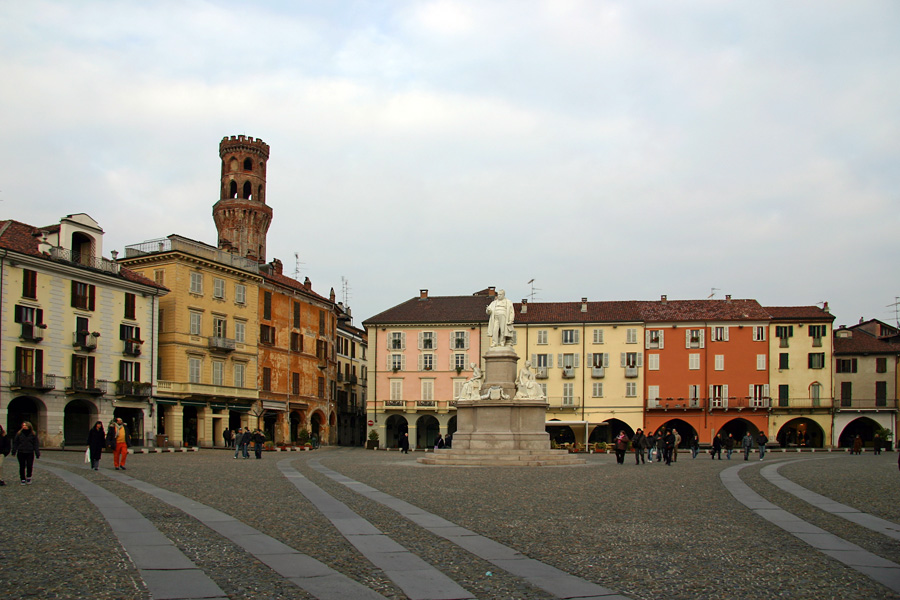
- Piazza Cavour and the Torre dell'Angelo.

- Coat of arms
- Motto(s): Potius mori quam foedari (roughly: "Death before dishonor")
- Location within Italy Location within Piedmont
- Coordinates: 45°19′32″N 08°25′23″E
- Country: Italy
- Region: Piedmont
- Province: Vercelli (VC)
- Frazioni: Brarola, Cappuccini, Larizzate, Bivio Sesia, Boarone, Campora, Canton Biliemme, Carengo, Cascina Mostioli, Cascine Strà, Cominetti, Montonero

Government
  - Mayor: Roberto Scheda

Area
  - Total: 79.77 km^{2} (30.80 sq mi)
- Elevation: 130 m (430 ft)

Population (1-1-2021)
  - Total: 45,875
  - Density: 575.1/km^{2} (1,489/sq mi)
- Demonym: Vercellese(i)
- Time zone: UTC+1 (CET)
  - Summer (DST): UTC+2 (CEST)
- Postal code: 13100
- Dialing code: 0161
- Patron saint: Eusebius of Vercelli
- Saint day: August 1
- Website: Official website

Vercelli (Italian: [verˈtʃɛlli]; Piedmontese: Vërsèj [vərˈsɛj]) is a city and comune (municipality) of 46,552 inhabitants (January 1, 2017) in the Province of Vercelli, Piedmont, northern Italy. One of the oldest urban sites in northern Italy, it was founded, according to most historians, around 600 BC.

The city is situated on the Sesia River in the plain of the Po River between Milan and Turin. It is an important centre for the cultivation of rice and is surrounded by rice paddies, which are flooded in the summer. The climate is typical of the Po Valley with cold, foggy winters (0.4 °C (33 °F) in January) and humid heat during the summer months (23.45 °C or 74 °F in July). Rainfall is most prevalent during the spring and autumn; thunderstorms are common in the summer.

The languages spoken in Vercelli are Italian and Piedmontese; the variety of Piedmontese native to the city is called Varslèis.

The world's first university funded by public money was established in Vercelli in 1228 (the seventh university founded in Italy), but was closed in 1372. Today it has a university of literature and philosophy as a part of the Università del Piemonte Orientale and a satellite campus of the Politecnico di Torino.

== History ==
Vercellae (or Vercelum) was the capital of the Libici or Lebecili, a Ligurian tribe; it became an important municipium, near which Gaius Marius defeated the Cimbri and the Teutones in the Battle of Vercellae in 101 BC.

The imperial magister militum Flavius Stilicho annihilated the Goths there 500 years later. It was half-ruined in St. Jerome's time (olim potens, nunc raro habitatore semiruta (1, 3.1)). After the Lombard invasion it belonged to the Duchy of Ivrea. From 885 it was under the jurisdiction of the prince-bishop, who was a Count of the Empire.

It became an independent commune in 1120 and joined the first and second Lombard leagues. Its statutes are among the most interesting of those of the medieval republics. In 1197 they abolished the servitude of the glebe. In 1228 the University of Pavia was transferred to Vercelli, where it remained until the fourteenth century, but without gaining much prominence; only a university school of law has been maintained.

In 1307, Fra Dolcino, the leader of the Dulcinians, was tortured and burned at the stake.

During the troubles of the 13th century, it fell into the power of the Della Torre of Milan (1263), of the Marquesses of Monferrato (1277), who appointed Matteo I Visconti captain (1290–1299). The Tizzoni (Ghibellines) and Avogadri (Guelphs) disputed the city from 1301 to 1334. The Guelphs were expelled several times, enabling the Marquess of Monferrato to take Vercelli (1328), which voluntarily placed itself under the Viscount of Milan in 1334. In 1373, Bishop Giovanni Fieschi expelled the Visconti, but Matteo reconquered the city. Facino Cane (1402), profiting by the strife between Giovanni Maria and Filippo Maria Visconti, took Vercelli, but was driven out by Theodore II of Montferrat (1404), from whom the city passed to the dukes of Savoy (1427).

In 1499 and 1553 Vercelli was captured by the French, and in 1616 and 1678 by the Spaniards. In 1704 it sustained an energetic siege by the French, who failed to destroy the fortress, after which it shared the fortunes of Savoy. In 1821 Vercelli rose in favour of the Constitution.

== Main sights ==
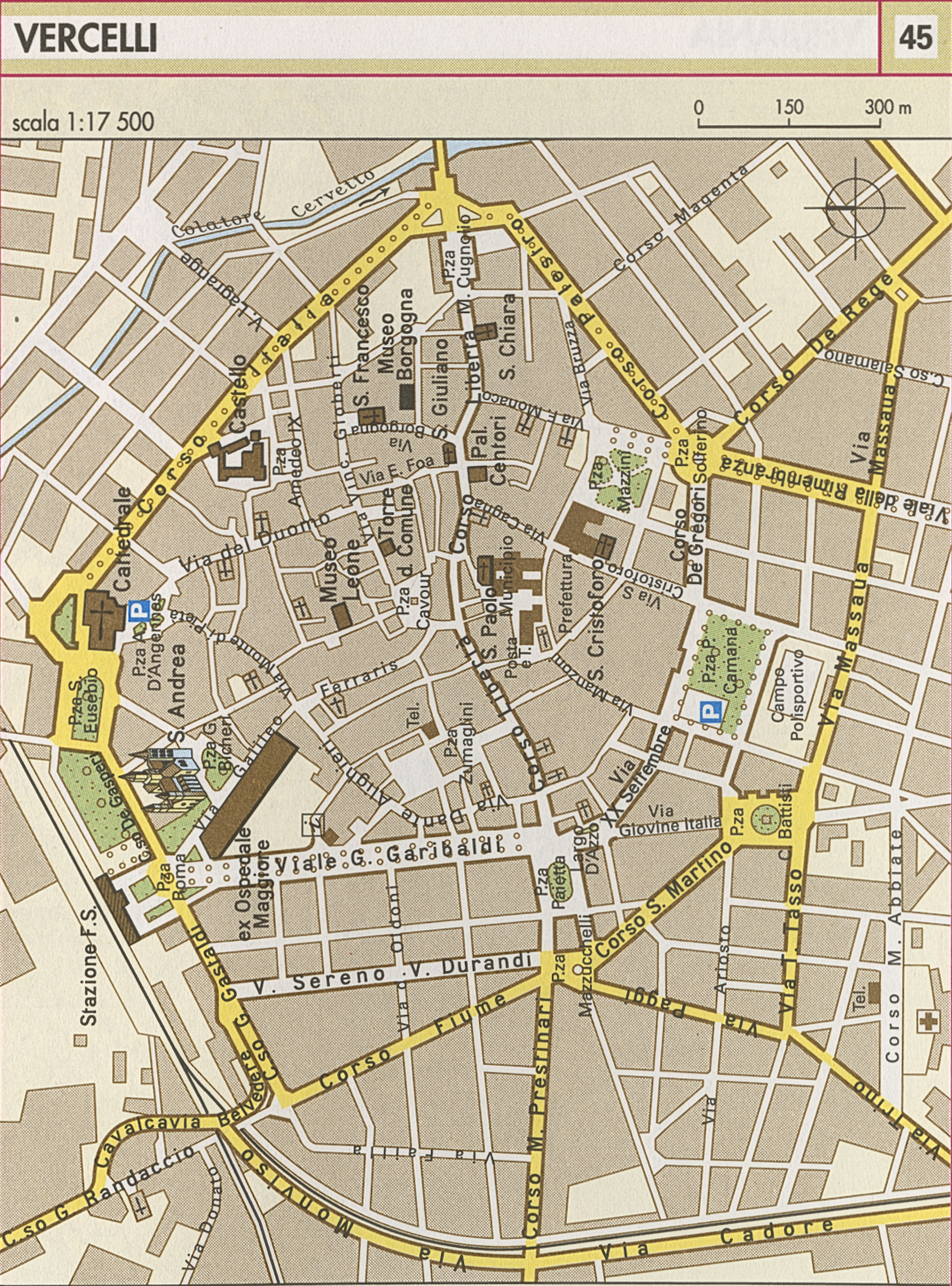
Plan of city center

Vercelli is home to numerous relics of the Roman period, e.g. an amphitheatre, hippodrome, sarcophagi, and many important inscriptions, some of which are Christian.

There are seven noteworthy towers in the town, the most important are the Torre dell'Angelo, which rears up over the old market square, and the Torre di Città in Via Gioberti.

St. Andrew's Basilica.

Vercelli Cathedral, formerly adorned with precious pillars and mosaics, was erected and enlarged by Saint Eusebius of Vercelli, to whom it was dedicated after his death. It was remodelled as of the ninth century and radically changed in the eighteenth by Count Alfieri. Like the other churches in the city, it contains valuable paintings, especially those of Gaudenzio Ferrari, Gerolamo Giovenone and Bernardino Lanino, who were natives of Vercelli.

The cathedral's Capitulary Library contains valuable manuscripts. Its religious texts include the Codex Vercellensis, an evangeliarium of the fourth century; hagiographical manuscripts, not all of which have been critically examined; and a very old copy of the Imitation of Christ, which is relied upon as an argument for attributing the authorship to John Gersen. Its secular texts include the Novels of Justinian; and the 8th-century Leges Langobardorum (Laws of the Lombards - Germanic). Finally, it contains the famous Vercelli Book — an Old English manuscript which includes the celebrated alliterative poem The Dream of the Rood. The civil archives are not less important and contain documents dating from 882.

The Basilica di Sant'Andrea was erected by Cardinal Guala Bicchieri in 1219. Together with the old Cistercian monastery, it is one of the most beautiful and best-preserved Romanesque monuments in Italy. Among other noteworthy churches in the city is the Santa Maria Maggiore.

Vercelli's synagogue, an example of Moorish Revival architecture, is located at Via Foà 70 and the city's Jewish cemetery at Corso Randaccio 24. On 23 November 2013, after what was believed to be an antisemitic act, two swastikas were found sprayed on its walls.

The Institute of the Beaux-Arts contains paintings by Vercellese artists.

Ancient charitable institutions continue, such as the hospital founded by Cardinal Guala Bicchieri (1224), which has an annual revenue of more than 600,000 lire ($117,000); and the hospices for orphan girls (1553) and for boys (1542), and mendicant homes.

Vercelli is the seat of the Viotti International Music Competition.

== Demographics ==
In 2007, 44,475 people were recorded as residing in Vercelli, of whom 47.3% were male and 52.7% were female. Minors (children aged 18 and younger) totalled 14.41% of the population and pensioners 25.83%; the overall national averages are, respectively, 18.06% and 19.94%. The average age of a Vercelli resident was 47 (five years more than the national average of 42) and the birth rate was 8.69 births per 1,000 inhabitants (national average of 9.45 births per 1,000 inhabitants). In the five years between 2002 and 2007, the population of Vercelli declined by 1.31% while the national population grew by 3.56%.

As of 2006, 92.38% of the population was Italian. The remainder were Albanian and Romanian (3.48%), North African (2.21%) and Sub-Saharan (0.64%). Approximately 1 in 6 babies born in Vercelli has at least one foreign parent.

Historical population

Year	Pop.	±%
1861	25,103	—
1871	27,101	+8.0%
1881	29,244	+7.9%
1901	30,470	+4.2%
1911	31,926	+4.8%
1921	32,159	+0.7%
1931	38,581	+20.0%
1936	38,956	+1.0%

Year	Pop.	±%
1951	42,159	+8.2%
1961	50,907	+20.8%
1971	56,494	+11.0%
1981	52,488	−7.1%
1991	49,458	−5.8%
2001	45,132	−8.7%
2011	46,308	+2.6%
2021	45,176	−2.4%

Source: ISTAT

== Museums ==
- Museo Camillo Leone
- Museo Francesco Borgogna

== Notable people ==
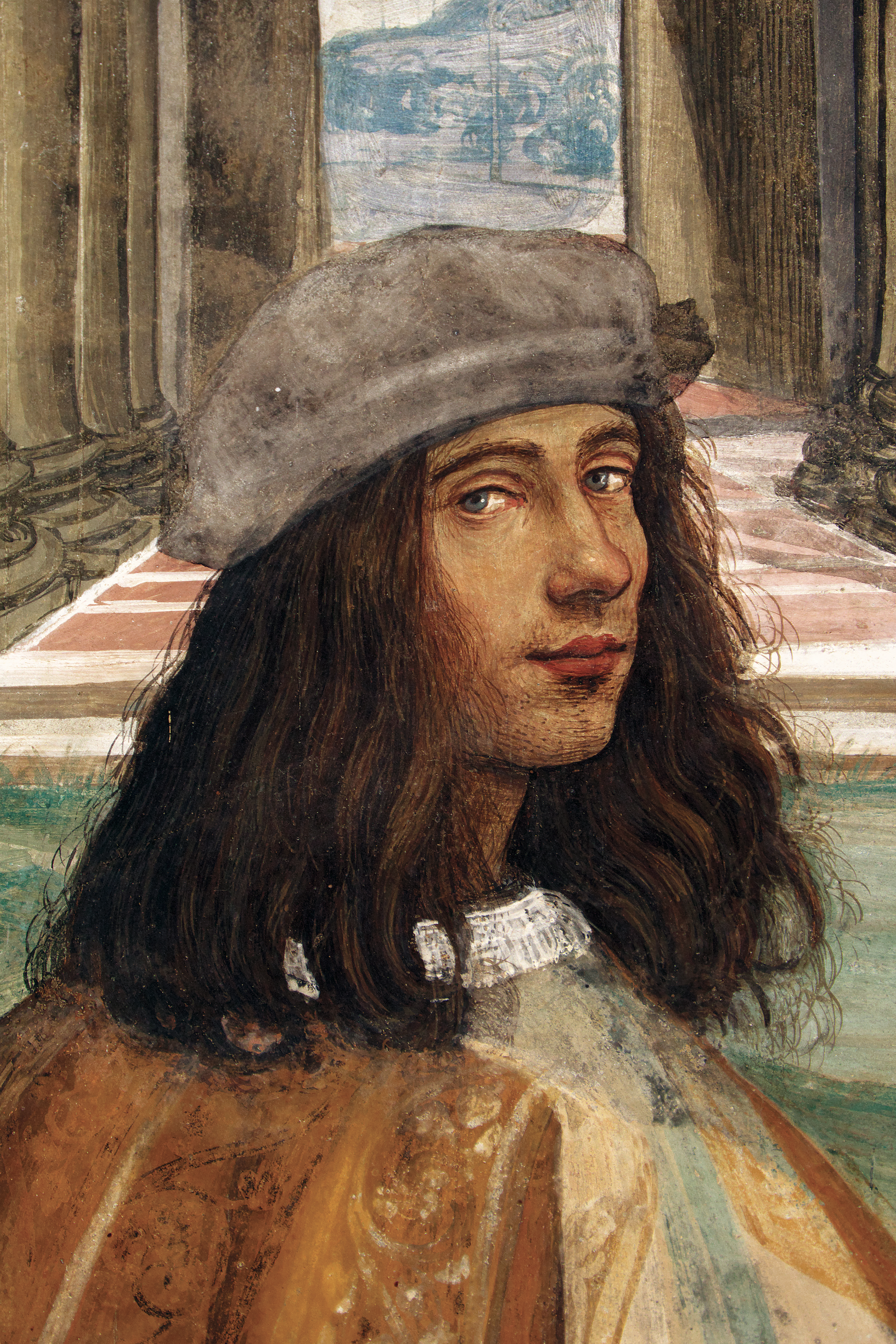
Giovanni Antonio Bazzi

- Eusebius of Vercelli (ca.283 – 371) first bishop in Vercelli (mid 340's) and counts as a saint.
- Atto II of Vercelli (ca.885–961), a Lombard, became bishop of Vercelli in 924.
- William of Montevergine (1085–1142), a wanderer, ascetic and founder of a number of monastic houses.
- Guala Bicchieri (ca.1150 – 1227) diplomat, papal official and cardinal.
- Emilia Bicchieri (1238–1314) Roman Catholic nun from the Order of Preachers
- Fra Dolcino (ca.1250 – 1307) second leader of the Dulcinian reformist movement, burned at the stake.
- Giovanni Antonio Bazzi (1477–1549), also known as Il Sodoma, a Renaissance painter.
- Francesco Antonio Vallotti (1697–1780) composer, music theorist and organist.
- Giacomo Abbondo (1720–1788), Roman Catholic priest, beatified in 2015.
- Eusebio Bava (1790–1854) army general who fought in the First Italian War of Independence.
- Edoardo Arborio Mella (1808–1884), architect, restorer and scholar.
- Angelo Agostini (1843–1910), illustrator, journalist and the first Brazilian cartoonist.
- Luigi Galleani (1861–1931), anarchist in the US; advocated propaganda of the deed
- Lucia Contini Anselmi (1876-after 1913), pianist and composer.
- Ennio Baiardi (1928–2014) politician, Mayor of Vercelli, 1975 to 1983
- Fiorenza Cossotto (born 1935), operatic mezzo-soprano.
- Angelo Gilardino (1941–2022), composer and classical guitarist.
- Anita Caprioli (born 1973), theatre and film actress.

=== Sport ===
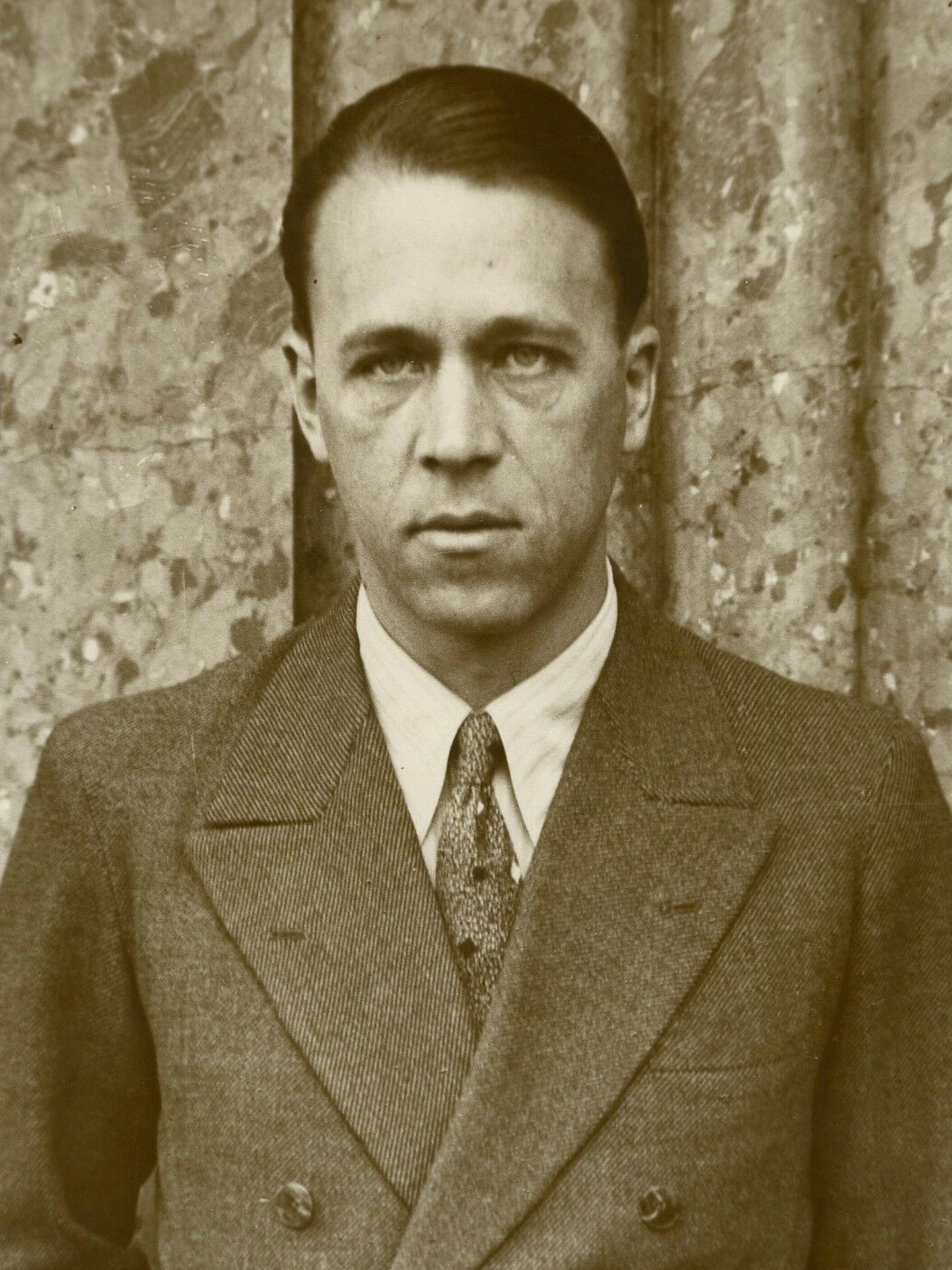
Virginio Rosetta, 1932

- Marcello Bertinetti (1885–1967), fencer, team gold medallist at the 1908, 1924 and 1928 Summer Olympics
- Virginio Rosetta (1902–1975) footballer with 423 club caps and 52 for Italy
- Pietro Ferraris (1912–1991), footballer with 533 club caps and 14 for Italy
- Silvio Piola (1913–1996), footballer with 619 club caps and 34 for Italy
- Teobaldo Depetrini (1914–1996), footballer with over 450 club caps and 12 for Italy
- Franco Bertinetti (1923–1995), fencer, team gold medallist at the 1952 & 1956 Summer Olympics
- Elisabetta Perrone (born 1968) race walker and multiple medallist
- Giovanni Pellielo (born 1970) sport shooter and four-time Olympic medallist in the trap
- Vittorio Mero (1974–2002), footballer with over 200 club caps
- Moise Kean (born 2000), footballer with over 100 club caps so far and 12 for Italy

== Cuisine ==
The typical dish is rice with beans, called panissa (made with Arborio, Baldo or Maratelli rice), the tartufata (cake) and the bicciolani a type of biscuit. The typical wine is Gattinara DOCG, a classic red wine of Piedmont made principally from the nebbiolo grape (known locally as spanna) from the comune of Gattinara, where there is archaeological evidence of vines being grown in Roman times.

== Sport ==
Unione Sportiva Pro Vercelli was one of the most successful football clubs in Italy in the early 20th century, winning the national championship seven times between 1908 and 1922. However, in the summer of 2010, it was not admitted to the league due to heavy debt.

A.S. Pro Belvedere Vercelli continued the history of the club and changed its name to F.C. Pro Vercelli 1892. Currently, it plays in Serie C.

== Twin towns ==
- Arles, France
- Tortosa, Spain

== Climate ==
Climate data for Vercelli (1991–2020)
Month	Jan	Feb	Mar	Apr	May	Jun	Jul	Aug	Sep	Oct	Nov	Dec	Year
Mean daily maximum °C (°F)	7.2 (45.0)	10.1 (50.2)	15.3 (59.5)	19.0 (66.2)	23.2 (73.8)	27.5 (81.5)	29.4 (84.9)	28.6 (83.5)	24.2 (75.6)	18.2 (64.8)	11.9 (53.4)	7.4 (45.3)	18.5 (65.3)
Daily mean °C (°F)	2.7 (36.9)	4.5 (40.1)	8.9 (48.0)	13.4 (56.1)	17.9 (64.2)	21.9 (71.4)	23.5 (74.3)	22.6 (72.7)	18.2 (64.8)	13.1 (55.6)	7.7 (45.9)	3.2 (37.8)	13.1 (55.7)
Mean daily minimum °C (°F)	−1.9 (28.6)	−1.2 (29.8)	2.5 (36.5)	7.9 (46.2)	12.7 (54.9)	16.3 (61.3)	17.6 (63.7)	16.7 (62.1)	12.1 (53.8)	8.0 (46.4)	3.4 (38.1)	−0.9 (30.4)	7.8 (46.0)
Average precipitation mm (inches)	45.4 (1.79)	50.4 (1.98)	52.5 (2.07)	84.0 (3.31)	96.7 (3.81)	60.7 (2.39)	55.4 (2.18)	66.7 (2.63)	80.3 (3.16)	76.5 (3.01)	116.1 (4.57)	56.7 (2.23)	841.4 (33.13)
Average precipitation days (≥ 1.0 mm)	5.0	4.2	4.5	7.7	8.5	6.0	4.9	5.8	5.8	7.0	8.1	5.1	72.6
Source: Istituto Superiore per la Protezione e la Ricerca Ambientale

== See also ==
- Communes of the Province of Vercelli

== Sources and external links ==
- Vercelli
- Macadam, Alta (1997). Blue Guide. Northern Italy: from the Alps to Bologna. London: A & C Black. ISBN 0-7136-4294-7.
- Benigni, Umberto (1912). "Archdiocese of Vercelli" . Catholic Encyclopedia. Vol. 15.
- Museo Borgogna
- Museo del Tesoro del Duomo
- Museo Camillo Leone
- Vini Italiani DOCG: Gattinara DOCG
- Riso Maratelli
