= US Milanese =

Defunct association football club in Italy

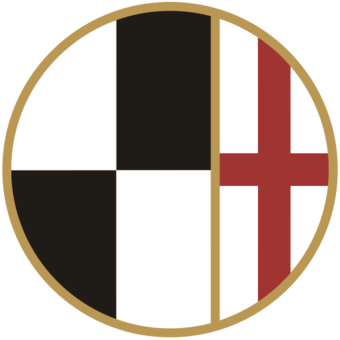
- Full name: Unione Sportiva Milanese
- Nickname: Gli Scacchi
- Founded: 16 January 1902; 124 years ago
- Dissolved: 1946; 80 years ago
Home colours	Away colours

Unione Sportiva Milanese was founded on 16 January 1902 as a multi-sports club, for compete in different disciplines, by Ambrogio Ferrario, Romolo Buni and Gilbert Marley at the Caffè Verdi in Porta Nuova in Milan. In the spring of 1904 the football section was established on the initiative of some footballers and gymnasts who left first A.C. Milan and then Mediolanum (among of which Umberto Meazza), while the affiliation to the Italian Football Federation (FIF), the current FIGC, took place in 1905.

The shirt was black and white checked, with white shorts and black socks. Red and white were the colors of the second jersey. By virtue of this choice, against the current compared to the norm of the others teams, were nicknamed "Gli Scacchi" (the chessmen).

At the end of the 1927-1928 championship, U.S. Milanese was automatically promoted to the National Division but was also forced by the fascist regime to merge with the Internazionale in the new Società Sportiva Ambrosiana, whose management was appointed Ernesto Torrusio, president of U.S. Milanese at the time, in favor of the fact that the registration number used to register for the championship was precisely that of U.S. Milanese.

For two years the S.S. Ambrosiana celebrated the U.S. Milanese using its historic logo and the black and white checkered collar: S.S. Ambrosiana won the Italian football championship in 1929/30 season.

1932 saw the end of the merger with Internazionale and the reconstitution of U.S. Milanese, which was reborn only as a sports club without the football section.

In 1945 U.S. Milanese resumed football activity only at a regional level, only to officially end it at the end of the 1945-1946 season.

In 2021, after 75 years, a new project is initiated: from the union of three clubs from the south of Milan (Accademia Sandonatese and ACD Metanopoli Calcio) Football Club Milanese 1902 is born, whose first team plays in the fifth division of the Italian championship, with a regional youth sector. F.C. Milanese 1902 was recreated with the intention of giving continuity in the football field to its ancestor U.S. Milanese, taking up its history, logo, traditions and club colours. Right now, F.C. Milanese 1902 is playing at the non-professional level with a youth sector of regional level.
