= 2023–24 Juventus FC season =

Italian football club season

Juventus
2023–24 season
- President: Gianluca Ferrero
- Head coach: Massimiliano Allegri (until 17 May); Paolo Montero (interim, from 19 May)
- Stadium: Juventus Stadium
- Serie A: 3rd
- Coppa Italia: Winners
- Top goalscorer: League: Dušan Vlahović (16); All: Dušan Vlahović (18)
- Highest home attendance: 41,507 vs Internazionale (26 November 2023, Serie A)
- Lowest home attendance: 37,470 vs Salernitana (12 May 2024, Serie A)
- Average home league attendance: 39,575
- Biggest win: Juventus 6–1 Salernitana
- Biggest defeat: Sassuolo 4–2 Juventus
Home colours	Away colours	Third colours

The 2023–24 season was Juventus Football Club's 126th season in existence and their 17th consecutive season in the top flight of Italian football. In addition to the domestic league, Juventus participated in this season's edition of the Coppa Italia, winning the competition after defeating Atalanta in the final.

On 28 July 2023, Juventus were excluded from participating in the UEFA Europa Conference League due to a violation of UEFA's financial regulations.

== Players ==
=== Squad information ===
Appearances and goals include league matches only.
Note: Flags indicate national team as has been defined under FIFA eligibility rules. Players may hold more than one non-FIFA nationality.

No.	Player	Nat.	Position(s)	Date of birth (age)	Signed in	Contract ends	Signed from	Transfer fee	Apps.	Goals
Goalkeepers
1	Wojciech Szczęsny	(Poland)	GK	18 April 1990 (aged 34)	2017	2025	(England) Arsenal	€12M	179	0
23	Carlo Pinsoglio	(Italy)	GK	16 March 1990 (aged 34)	2014	2025	(Italy) Vicenza	€0.7M	6	0
36	Mattia Perin	(Italy)	GK	10 November 1992 (aged 31)	2018	2025	(Italy) Genoa	€12M	43	0
Defenders
2	Mattia De Sciglio	(Italy)	RB / RWB / LB / LWB	20 October 1992 (aged 31)	2017	2025	(Italy) Milan	€12M	117	2
3	Bremer	(Brazil)	CB	18 March 1997 (aged 27)	2022	2028	(Italy) Torino	€41M	59	6
4	Federico Gatti	(Italy)	CB	24 June 1998 (aged 26)	2022	2028	(Italy) Frosinone	€5.4M	41	3
6	Danilo (c)	(Brazil)	CB / RB / LB	15 July 1991 (aged 32)	2019	2025	(England) Manchester City	€37M	179	8
12	Alex Sandro	(Brazil)	LB / LWB	26 January 1991 (aged 33)	2015	2024	(Portugal) Porto	€26M	317	16
24	Daniele Rugani	(Italy)	CB	29 July 1994 (aged 29)	2015	2026	(Italy) Empoli	€3.5M	136	9
27	Andrea Cambiaso	(Italy)	RB / RWB / LB / LWB	20 February 2000 (aged 24)	2022	2029	(Italy) Genoa	€8.8M	16	1
33	Tiago Djaló	(Portugal)	CB / RB / LB	9 April 2000 (aged 24)	2024	2026	(France) Lille	€5.10M	1	0
Midfielders
5	Manuel Locatelli	(Italy)	CM	8 January 1998 (aged 26)	2021	2028	(Italy) Sassuolo	€30M	108	3
10	Paul Pogba	(France)	CM	15 March 1993 (aged 31)	2022	2026	(England) Manchester United	Free	188	34
11	Filip Kostić	(Serbia)	LWB / LW	1 November 1992 (aged 31)	2022	2026	(Germany) Eintracht Frankfurt	€12M	64	3
16	Weston McKennie	(United States)	CM / RB / RWB	28 August 1998 (aged 25)	2020	2025	(Germany) Schalke 04	€22M	80	8
20	Fabio Miretti	(Italy)	CM / AM	3 August 2003 (aged 20)	2021	2027	(Italy) Youth Sector	N/A	57	0
21	Nicolò Fagioli	(Italy)	CM / DM	12 February 2001 (aged 23)	2020	2028	(Italy) Youth Sector	N/A	41	3
22	Timothy Weah	(United States)	RWB / RW / LW / AM	22 February 2000 (aged 24)	2023	2028	(France) Lille	€10.3M	15	0
25	Adrien Rabiot	(France)	CM	3 April 1995 (aged 29)	2019	2024	(France) Paris Saint-Germain	Free	192	19
26	Carlos Alcaraz	(Argentina)	CM/AM	30 November 2002 (aged 21)	2024	2024	(England) Southampton	€3.7M	12	0
39	Nikola Sekulov	(Italy)	RW / LW / AM	18 February 2002 (aged 22)	2021	2027	(Italy) Youth Sector	N/A	0	0
41	Hans Nicolussi Caviglia	(Italy)	CM / DM	18 June 2000 (aged 24)	2018	2026	(Italy) Youth Sector	N/A	5	0
47	Joseph Nonge	(Belgium)	CM / DM	15 May 2005 (aged 19)	2023	2026	(Italy) Youth Sector	N/A	1	0
Forwards
7	Federico Chiesa	(Italy)	AM / RW / LW	25 October 1997 (aged 26)	2020	2025	(Italy) Fiorentina	€40M	113	26
9	Dušan Vlahović	(Serbia)	ST	28 January 2000 (aged 24)	2022	2026	(Italy) Fiorentina	€70M	79	29
14	Arkadiusz Milik	(Poland)	ST	28 February 1994 (aged 30)	2022	2026	(France) Marseille	€6.3M	51	12
15	Kenan Yıldız	(Turkey)	AM	4 May 2005 (aged 19)	2023	2027	(Italy) Youth Sector	N/A	17	1
17	Samuel Iling-Junior	(England)	RW / LW / AM	4 October 2003 (aged 20)	2022	2025	(Italy) Youth Sector	N/A	30	1
18	Moise Kean	(Italy)	ST	28 February 2000 (aged 24)	2021	2025	(England) Everton	€30M	110	22
45	Leonardo Cerri	(Italy)	ST	4 March 2003 (aged 21)	2021	2026	(Italy) Youth Sector	N/A	0	0
Players transferred during the season
13	Dean Huijsen (Note: On 21 February 2024, Dean Huijsen obtained Spanish citizenship.)	(Netherlands)	CB	14 April 2005 (aged 19)	2023	2027	(Italy) Youth Sector	N/A	0	0
26	Kaio Jorge	(Brazil)	ST	24 January 2002 (aged 22)	2021	2026	(Brazil) Santos	€1.5M	11	0
30	Matías Soulé	(Argentina)	RW / LW / AM	15 April 2003 (aged 21)	2021	2026	(Italy) Youth Sector	N/A	21	1

== Transfers ==
=== Summer 2023 ===
==== In ====
Date	Pos.	Player	Age	Moving from	Fee	Notes	Source
1 July 2023	DF	(Italy) Andrea Cambiaso	23	(Italy) Bologna	N/A	End of loan	
1 July 2023	MF	(United States) Weston McKennie	24	(England) Leeds United	N/A	End of loan	
1 July 2023	MF	(Italy) Hans Nicolussi Caviglia	23	(Italy) Salernitana	N/A	End of loan	
1 July 2023	MF	(United States) Timothy Weah	23	(France) Lille	€11M	€2.1M variables	

==== Out ====
Date	Pos.	Player	Age	Moving to	Fee	Notes	Source
1 July 2023	MF	(Argentina) Leandro Paredes	29	(France) Paris Saint-Germain	Free	End of loan	
6 July 2023	FW	(Argentina) Ángel Di María	35	(Portugal) Benfica	Free	Released	
20 July 2023	DF	(Italy) Tommaso Barbieri	20	(Italy) Pisa	N/A	On loan until June 2024 with option to buy for €2M	
20 July 2023	MF	(Colombia) Juan Cuadrado	35	(Italy) Inter Milan	Free	Released	
15 August 2023	MF	(Argentina) Enzo Barrenechea	22	(Italy) Frosinone	N/A	On loan until June 2024	
28 August 2023	FW	(Argentina) Matías Soulé	20	(Italy) Frosinone	N/A	On loan until June 2024	
29 August 2023	FW	(Brazil) Kaio Jorge	21	(Italy) Frosinone	N/A	On loan until June 2024	
1 September 2023	DF	(Italy) Leonardo Bonucci	36	(Germany) Union Berlin	Free		

==== Other acquisitions ====
Date	Pos.	Player	Age	Moving from	Fee	Notes	Source
21 June 2023	FW	(Poland) Arkadiusz Milik	29	(France) Marseille	€7.3M	From loan to definitive purchase	
1 July 2023	MF	(Italy) Manuel Locatelli	25	(Italy) Sassuolo	€35M	From loan to definitive purchase + €2.5M variables	
1 July 2023	MF	(Italy) Clemente Perotti	20	(Italy) Pro Patria	N/A	End of loan to play for Juventus Next Gen	
1 July 2023	FW	(Italy) Gianmarco Di Biase	17	(Italy) Pistoiese	N/A	End of loan to play for Juventus FC Youth Sector	
1 July 2023	FW	(Italy) Moise Kean	23	(England) Everton	€30M	From loan to definitive purchase	
26 July 2023	MF	(Norway) Martin Palumbo	21	(Italy) Udinese	Free	From loan to definitive purchase to play for Juventus Next Gen	
8 August 2023	DF	(Uruguay) Facundo González	20	(Spain) Valencia	€1.65M	€0.4M variables and for future sale	
21 August 2023	FW	(Italy) Simone Guerra	33	(Italy) Feralpisalò	€0.1M	To play for Juventus Next Gen	
29 August 2023	DF	(Italy) Riccardo Stivanello	19	(Italy) Bologna	N/A	On loan to play for Juventus Next Gen	
1 September 2023	DF	(Netherlands) Livano Comenencia	19	(Netherlands) PSV Eindhoven	€3M	To play for Juventus Next Gen	
1 September 2023	MF	(Italy) Samuele Damiani	25	(Italy) Palermo	N/A	On loan to play for Juventus Next Gen	
1 September 2023	MF	(Togo) Dikeni Salifou	20	(Germany) Werder Bremen	N/A	On loan to play for Juventus Next Gen with option to buy	
23 October 2023	GK	(Italy) Gian Marco Crespi	22	Unattached	Free	To play for Juventus Next Gen	

==== Other disposals ====
Date	Pos.	Player	Age	Moving to	Fee	Notes	Source
1 April 2023	DF	(Switzerland) Albian Hajdari	19	(Switzerland) Lugano	€2.9M	Redeem after loan	
17 June 2023	MF	(Sweden) Dejan Kulusevski	23	(England) Tottenham Hotspur	€30M	Redeem after loan + €9M variables	
1 July 2023	GK	(Italy) Gian Marco Crespi	22	(Italy) Crotone	N/A	End of loan	
1 July 2023	DF	(Italy) Alessandro Di Pardo	23	(Italy) Cagliari	€2M	Redeem after loan	
1 July 2023	DF	(Romania) Radu Drăgușin	21	(Italy) Genoa	€5.5M	Redeem after loan + €1.8M variables and for future sale	
1 July 2023	MF	(Italy) Michele Besaggio	20	(Italy) Genoa	N/A	End of loan	
1 July 2023	FW	(Benin) Angel Chibozo	20	(France) Amiens	€1M	Redeem after loan	
7 July 2023	MF	(Belgium) Daouda Peeters	24	(Italy) Südtirol	N/A	On loan until June 2024	
7 July 2023	FW	(Italy) Emanuele Pecorino	21	(Italy) Südtirol	N/A	On loan until June 2024	
11 July 2023	DF	(Italy) Erasmo Mulè	24	(Italy) Avellino	N/A	On loan until June 2024 with obligation to buy	
12 July 2023	DF	(France) Félix Nzouango	20	(Belgium) Beerschot	Free	Released	
15 July 2023	MF	(Italy) Mattia Compagnon	21	(Italy) Feralpisalò	N/A	On loan until June 2024 with option to buy	
15 July 2023	MF	(Italy) Nikola Sekulov	21	(Italy) Cremonese	N/A	On loan until June 2024 with option to buy	
17 July 2023	MF	(Italy) Filippo Ranocchia	22	(Italy) Empoli	€0.5M	On loan until June 2024 with option to buy for €5.5M	
20 July 2023	GK	(Italy) Marco Raina	21	(Italy) Arzignano Valchiampo	Free	Released	
22 July 2023	MF	(Brazil) Arthur	26	(Italy) Fiorentina	€2M	On loan until June 2024 with option to buy for €20M + €2M variables	
24 July 2023	MF	(Italy) Andrea Bonetti	19	(Italy) Taranto	N/A	On loan until June 2024	
27 July 2023	DF	(Italy) Filippo Fiumanò	20	(Italy) Pro Vercelli	Free		
27 July 2023	FW	(Italy) Nicolò Turco	19	(Austria) Red Bull Salzburg	€2.75M	€1.5M variables and for future sale	
27 July 2022	FW	(Venezuela) Alejandro Marqués	21	(Portugal) Estoril	Free	Redeem after loan	
31 July 2023	GK	(Italy) Stefano Gori	27	(Italy) Monza	N/A	On loan until June 2024 with option to buy	
1 August 2023	GK	(Italy) Mattia Del Favero	25	(Italy) SPAL	Free	Released	
1 August 2023	MF	(Netherlands) Mohamed Ihattaren	21	(Turkey) Samsunspor	Free	Released	
4 August 2023	DF	(Italy) Lorenzo Dellavalle	19	(United States) Los Angeles FC	Free	Variables for future sale	
7 August 2023	MF	(France) Marley Aké	21	(Italy) Udinese	N/A	On loan until June 2024 with option to buy	
11 August 2023	DF	(Belgium) Koni De Winter	21	(Italy) Genoa	N/A	On loan until June 2024 with obligation to buy for €10M	
11 August 2023	MF	(Italy) Alessandro Sersanti	20	(Italy) Lecco	N/A	On loan until June 2024	
11 August 2023	FW	(Switzerland) Christopher Lungoyi	22	(Switzerland) Yverdon	N/A	On loan until June 2024 with option to buy	
14 August 2023	DF	(Italy) Davide De Marino	23	(Italy) Virtus Francavilla	N/A	Renowal of loan until June 2024	
14 August 2023	MF	(Switzerland) Denis Zakaria	26	(France) Monaco	€20M	Variables for future sale	
17 August 2023	DF	(Italy) Luca Pellegrini	24	(Italy) Lazio	N/A	Renowal of loan until June 2025 with obligation of buy for €4.5M	
17 August 2023	MF	(Italy) Nicolò Rovella	21	(Italy) Lazio	N/A	On loan until June 2025 with obligation to buy for €17M	
18 August 2023	FW	(Italy) Marco Olivieri	23	(Italy) Venezia	N/A	On loan until June 2024 with option to buy	
22 August 2023	DF	(Uruguay) Facundo González	20	(Italy) Sampdoria	N/A	On loan until June 2024	
22 August 2023	FW	(Portugal) Félix Correia	22	(Portugal) Gil Vicente	N/A	On loan until June 2024 with option to buy	
22 August 2023	FW	(Switzerland) Yannick Cotter	20	(Switzerland) Yverdon	Free		
27 August 2023	DF	(Italy) Gianluca Frabotta	24	(Italy) Bari	N/A	On loan until June 2024 with option to buy	
28 August 2023	DF	(Switzerland) Daniel Leo	21	(Italy) Crotone	Free	Buy back option	
30 August 2023	DF	(Italy) Alessandro Minelli	24	(Italy) Pro Patria	N/A	On loan until June 2024	
30 August 2023	FW	(Italy) Nicolò Cudrig	20	(Italy) Perugia	N/A	On loan until June 2024	
30 August 2023	FW	(Italy) Marco Da Graca	20	(Spain) Amorebieta	N/A	On loan until June 2024	
31 August 2023	DF	(Italy) Alessandro Pio Riccio	21	(Italy) Modena	N/A	On loan until June 2024	
1 September 2023	MF	(Italy) Ferdinando Del Sole	25	(Italy) Latina	N/A	On loan until June 2024	
1 September 2023	FW	(Italy) Mirco Lipari	20	(Italy) Recanatese	N/A	On loan until June 2024	
1 September 2023	FW	(Croatia) Marko Pjaca	20	(Croatia) Rijeka	Free		

=== Winter 2023–24 ===
==== In ====
Date	Pos.	Player	Age	Moving from	Fee	Notes	Source
22 January 2024	DF	(Portugal) Tiago Djaló	23	(France) Lille	€5.10M		
31 January 2024	MF	(Argentina) Carlos Alcaraz	21	(England) Southampton	€3.70M	On loan until June 2024 with option to buy for €49.5M	

==== Out ====
Date	Pos.	Player	Age	Moving to	Fee	Notes	Source
6 January 2024	DF	(Netherlands) Dean Huijsen	18	(Italy) Roma	€0.65M	On loan until June 2024	

==== Other acquisitions ====
Date	Pos.	Player	Age	Moving from	Fee	Notes	Source
11 January 2024	FW	(Italy) Marco Da Graca	21	(Spain) Amorebieta	N/A	End of loan to play for Juventus Next Gen	
12 January 2024	MF	(Italy) Nikola Sekulov	21	(Italy) Cremonese	N/A	End of loan to play for Juventus Next Gen	
19 January 2024	MF	(Italy) Andrea Bonetti	20	(Italy) Taranto	N/A	End of loan to play for Juventus Next Gen	
31 January 2024	DF	(Brazil) Pedro Felipe	19	(Brazil) Palmeiras	N/A	On loan until June 2024 to play for Juventus Next Gen with option to buy	

==== Other disposals ====
Date	Pos.	Player	Age	Moving to	Fee	Notes	Source
11 January 2024	DF	(Italy) Giulio Doratiotto	19	(United States) Phoenix Rising FC	Free		
11 January 2024	DF	(Italy) Gianluca Frabotta	24	(Italy) Cosenza	Free	On loan until June 2024 after the interruption of loan with Bari	
12 January 2024	DF	(Italy) Alessandro Citi	21	(Italy) Pro Vercelli	Free	On loan until June 2024	
18 January 2024	GK	(Italy) Gian Marco Crespi	22	(Italy) Spezia	Free		
18 January 2024	MF	(France) Marley Aké	23	(Switzerland) Yverdon	N/A	On loan until June 2024 with option to buy after the interruption of loan with Udinese	
18 January 2024	MF	(Italy) Filippo Ranocchia	22	(Italy) Palermo	€4M	Permanent deal after the interruption of loan with Empoli	
1 February 2024	DF	(Italy) Diego Stramaccioni	23	(Italy) Reggiana	€0.3M	On loan until June 2024 with Juventus Next Gen	
1 February 2024	DF	(Italy) Andrea Valdesi	19	(Italy) Giugliano	N/A	On loan until June 2024	
14 February 2024	MF	(Italy) Tommaso Maressa	19	(Switzerland) Bellinzona	N/A	On loan until June 2024	
15 February 2024	DF	(France) Jean-Claude Ntenda	21	(Switzerland) Sion	N/A	On loan until June 2024	

== Pre-season and friendlies ==
22 July 2023 Soccer Champions Tour	Barcelona	Cancelled	Juventus	Santa Clara, United States
19:30 PDT (UTC−7)		Report		Stadium: Levi's Stadium
Note: The match was cancelled due to a viral gastroenteritis outbreak among a significant part of the Barcelona squad.

27 July 2023 Soccer Champions Tour	Juventus	2–2 (4–3 p)	Milan	Carson, United States
19:30 PDT (UTC−7)	Danilo 33'; Rugani 48'; Locatelli (yellow card) 54'	Report	Thiaw (yellow card) 15', (goal) 23'; Giroud 39'	Stadium: Dignity Health Sports Park; Attendance: 8,000; Referee: Timothy Ford (United States)
	Penalties
	Milik (penalty scored); Iling-Junior (penalty missed); Nicolussi Caviglia (penalty scored); Huijsen (penalty scored); Kostić (penalty missed); Soulé (penalty scored)		(penalty missed) Romero; (penalty scored) Adli; (penalty missed) Pobega; (penalty scored) Colombo; (penalty scored) De Ketelaere; (penalty missed) Bartesaghi

2 August 2023 Soccer Champions Tour	Juventus	3–1	Real Madrid	Orlando, Florida, United States
19:30 EDT (UTC−4)	Kean 1'; Bremer (yellow card) 4'; Weah 20'; Gatti (yellow card) 54'; Locatelli (yellow card) 55'; Barrenechea (yellow card) 89'; Milik (yellow card) 90+3'; Vlahović 90+5'	Report	Vinícius 38'	Stadium: Camping World Stadium; Attendance: 63,503; Referee: Ismail Elfath (United States)

9 August 2023 Friendly	Juventus	8–0	Juventus Next Gen	Turin, Italy
18:30 CEST (UTC+2)	Vlahović 16' (pen.), 32'; Kean 38'; Kaio Jorge 50', 69', 78'; Milik 72'; Huijsen 83'	Report		Stadium: Juventus Stadium; Attendance: 24,000; Referee: Eugenio Scarpa

12 August 2023 Friendly	Juventus	0–0	Atalanta	Cesena, Italy
20:30 CEST (UTC+2)	Alex Sandro (yellow card) 43'	Report	Scalvini (yellow card) 17'	Stadium: Stadio Dino Manuzzi; Attendance: 18,333; Referee: Ermanno Feliciani

== Competitions ==
=== Overview ===
Competition	First match	Last match	Starting round	Final position	Record							
Competition	First match	Last match	Starting round	Final position	Pld	W	D	L	GF	GA	GD	Win %
Serie A	20 August 2023	25 May 2024	Matchday 1	3rd	38	19	14	5	54	31	+23	50.00
Coppa Italia	4 January 2024	15 May 2024	Round of 16	Winners	5	4	0	1	14	3	+11	80.00
Total					43	23	14	6	68	34	+34	53.49

Source: Soccerway

=== Serie A ===
==== League table ====
Pos	Team	Pld	W	D	L	GF	GA	GD	Pts	Qualification or relegation
1	Inter Milan (C)	38	29	7	2	89	22	+67	94	Qualification for the Champions League league phase (Note: Serie A gained an additional Champions League place as a result of Italy finishing as one of the two associations with the highest coefficient points in 2023–24.)
2	Milan	38	22	9	7	76	49	+27	75	Qualification for the Champions League league phase
3	Juventus	38	19	14	5	54	31	+23	71	Qualification for the Champions League league phase
4	Atalanta	38	21	6	11	72	42	+30	69	Qualification for the Champions League league phase
5	Bologna	38	18	14	6	54	32	+22	68	Qualification for the Champions League league phase

Source: Serie A
Rules for classification: 1) Points; 2) Tiebreaker for Champions team and third relegated team; 3) Head-to-head points; 4) Head-to-head goal difference; 5) Goal difference; 6) Goals scored; 7) Draw.
(Note: Head-to-head record is used only after all the matches between the teams in question have been played)
(C) Champions

==== Results summary ====
Overall								Home						Away					
Pld	W	D	L	GF	GA	GD	Pts	W	D	L	GF	GA	GD	W	D	L	GF	GA	GD
38	19	14	5	54	31	+23	71	11	7	1	26	11	+15	8	7	4	28	20	+8

Source: Serie A

==== Results by round ====
Round	1	2	3	4	5	6	7	8	9	10	11	12	13	14	15	16	17	18	19	20	21	22	23	24	25	26	27	28	29	30	31	32	33	34	35	36	37	38
Ground	A	H	A	H	A	H	A	H	A	H	A	H	H	A	H	A	A	H	A	H	A	H	A	H	A	H	A	H	H	A	H	A	A	H	A	H	A	H
Result	W	D	W	W	L	W	D	W	W	W	W	W	D	W	W	D	W	W	W	W	W	D	L	L	D	W	L	D	D	L	W	D	D	D	D	D	D	W
Position	2	6	3	2	4	3	4	3	3	2	2	2	2	2	2	2	2	2	2	2	1	2	2	2	2	2	2	3	3	3	3	3	3	3	3	4	4	3

Source: Serie A
A = Away; H = Home; W = Win; D = Draw; L = Loss

==== Matches ====
The league fixtures were announced on 5 July 2023.

20 August 2023 1	Udinese	0–3	Juventus	Udine
20:45 CEST (UTC+2)	Kabasele (yellow card) 31'	Report	Chiesa 2'; Vlahović 20' (pen.); Alex Sandro (yellow card) 28'; Danilo (yellow card) 35'; Rabiot 45+3'; Locatelli (yellow card) 90+5'	Stadium: Stadio Friuli; Attendance: 24,991; Referee: Antonio Rapuano

27 August 2023 2	Juventus	1–1	Bologna	Turin
18:30 CEST (UTC+2)	Rabiot (yellow card) 12'; Vlahović 80'; Yıldız (yellow card) 87'	Report	Posch (yellow card) 17'; Ferguson 24'	Stadium: Juventus Stadium; Attendance: 38,197; Referee: Marco Di Bello

3 September 2023 3	Empoli	0–2	Juventus	Empoli
20:45 CEST (UTC+2)	Bereszyński (yellow card) 43'; Gyasi (yellow card) 86'; Destro (yellow card) 90+8'	Report	Locatelli (yellow card) 15'; Danilo 24'; Vlahović (penalty missed) 39', (yellow card) 48'; Miretti (yellow card) 49'; Chiesa 82'	Stadium: Stadio Carlo Castellani; Attendance: 15,702; Referee: Giovanni Ayroldi

16 September 2023 4	Juventus	3–1	Lazio	Turin
15:00 CEST (UTC+2)	Miretti (yellow card) 8'; Vlahović 10', 67', (yellow card) 82'; Bremer (yellow card) 16'; Chiesa 26'; Gatti (yellow card) 61'; Cambiaso (yellow card) 77'	Report	Luis Alberto 64'; Pellegrini (yellow card) 85'	Stadium: Juventus Stadium; Attendance: 40,562; Referee: Fabio Maresca

23 September 2023 5	Sassuolo	4–2	Juventus	Reggio Emilia
18:00 CEST (UTC+2)	Laurienté 12'; Berardi 41', (yellow card) 58'; Boloca (yellow card) 52'; Viña (yellow card) 64'; Pinamonti 82', (yellow card) 83'; Gatti 90+5' (o.g.)	Report	Viña 21' (o.g.); Rabiot (yellow card) 36'; Danilo (yellow card) 55'; Chiesa 78'	Stadium: Mapei Stadium – Città del Tricolore; Attendance: 20,141; Referee: Andrea Colombo

26 September 2023 6	Juventus	1–0	Lecce	Turin
20:45 CEST (UTC+2)	Milik 57'; Chiesa (yellow card) 76'; Rabiot (yellow card) 90+1'	Report	Ramadani (yellow card) 30'; Rafia (yellow card) 69'; Kaba (yellow card) 85' (yellow-red card) 90+3'; Krstović (yellow card) 90'	Stadium: Juventus Stadium; Attendance: 38,445; Referee: Antonio Giua

1 October 2023 7	Atalanta	0–0	Juventus	Bergamo
18:00 CEST (UTC+2) (Note: The match was originally scheduled to be played at 20:45 CEST (UTC+2) before being rescheduled at 18:00 CEST (UTC+2).)	Holm (yellow card) 90+4'	Report	Rabiot (yellow card) 45'; Danilo (yellow card) 53'	Stadium: Stadio Atleti Azzurri d'Italia; Attendance: 14,811; Referee: Daniele Chiffi

7 October 2023 8	Juventus	2–0	Torino	Turin
18:00 CEST (UTC+2)	Gatti 47', (yellow card) 71'; Milik 62'	Report	Bellanova (yellow card) 21'	Stadium: Juventus Stadium; Attendance: 39,602; Referee: Davide Massa (Note: Originally, the referee appointed for the match was Antonio Rapuano.)

22 October 2023 9	Milan	0–1	Juventus	Milan
20:45 CEST (UTC+2)	Thiaw (red card) 40'; Reijnders (yellow card) 61'	Report	Weah (yellow card) 52'; Locatelli 63', (yellow card) 72'; McKennie (yellow card) 67'; Gatti (yellow card) 71'	Stadium: San Siro; Attendance: 75,676; Referee: Maurizio Mariani

28 October 2023 10	Juventus	1–0	Hellas Verona	Turin
20:45 CEST (UTC+2)	Rugani (yellow card) 40'; Kean (yellow card) 56'; Cambiaso 90+6', (yellow card) 90+8'	Report	Đurić (yellow card) 38'; Folorunsho (yellow card) 50'	Stadium: Juventus Stadium; Attendance: 39,438; Referee: Ermanno Feliciani

5 November 2023 11	Fiorentina	0–1	Juventus	Florence
20:45 CET (UTC+1)	Ranieri (yellow card) 83'	Report	Miretti 10'; Rabiot (yellow card) 43'; Kean (yellow card) 48'; Gatti (yellow card) 58'	Stadium: Stadio Artemio Franchi; Attendance: 38,225; Referee: Daniele Chiffi

11 November 2023 12	Juventus	2–1	Cagliari	Turin
18:00 CET (UTC+1)	McKennie (yellow card) 57'; Bremer 60'; Rugani 70'; Kostić (yellow card) 82'; Cambiaso (yellow card) 87'	Report	Luvumbo (yellow card) 70'; Dossena 75'	Stadium: Juventus Stadium; Attendance: 40,393; Referee: Marco Piccinini

26 November 2023 13	Juventus	1–1	Internazionale	Turin
20:45 CET (UTC+1)	Cambiaso (yellow card) 11'; Vlahović 27'; Kostić (yellow card) 79'	Report	Martínez 33'; Cuadrado (yellow card) 75'	Stadium: Juventus Stadium; Attendance: 41,507; Referee: Marco Guida

1 December 2023 14	Monza	1–2	Juventus	Monza
20:45 CET (UTC+1)	Kyriakopoulos (yellow card) 9'; Carboni 90+2'	Report	Vlahović (penalty missed) 11'; Rabiot 12'; Bremer (yellow card) 30'; Milik (yellow card) 81'; Gatti 90+4'	Stadium: Stadio Brianteo; Attendance: 15,148; Referee: Michael Fabbri

8 December 2023 15	Juventus	1–0	Napoli	Turin
20:45 CET (UTC+1)	Gatti 51'; Bremer (yellow card) 58'; Locatelli (yellow card) 90+5'	Report	Kvaratskhelia (yellow card) 45+1'; Juan Jesus (yellow card) 63'; Østigård (yellow card) 86'; Osimhen (yellow card) 90+5'	Stadium: Juventus Stadium; Attendance: 41,400; Referee: Daniele Orsato

15 December 2023 16	Genoa	1–1	Juventus	Genoa
20:45 CET (UTC+1)	Guðmundsson 48'; Badelj (yellow card) 74'; Malinovskyi (yellow card) 90'	Report	Chiesa 28' (pen.); Danilo (yellow card) 61'; McKennie (yellow card) 70'; Milik (yellow card) 71'	Stadium: Stadio Luigi Ferraris; Attendance: 33,232; Referee: Davide Massa

23 December 2023 17	Frosinone	1–2	Juventus	Frosinone
12:30 CET (UTC+1)	Báez 51'	Report	Yıldız 12'; Cambiaso (yellow card) 20'; McKennie (yellow card) 43'; Vlahović 81'	Stadium: Stadio Benito Stirpe; Attendance: 16,020; Referee: Maurizio Mariani

30 December 2023 18	Juventus	1–0	Roma	Turin
20:45 CET (UTC+1)	Rabiot 47'; Locatelli (yellow card) 77'	Report	Paredes (yellow card) 68'	Stadium: Juventus Stadium; Attendance: 41,503; Referee: Simone Sozza

7 January 2024 19	Salernitana	1–2	Juventus	Salerno
18:00 CET (UTC+1) (Note: The match was originally scheduled to be played at 20:45 CET (UTC+1) before being rescheduled at 18:00 CET (UTC+1).)	Gyömbér (yellow card) 19'; Maggiore (yellow card) 32' (yellow-red card) 53', (goal) 39'	Report	Gatti (yellow card) 43'; Iling-Junior 65'; McKennie (yellow card) 69'; Rugani (yellow card) 73'; Vlahović 90+1', (yellow card) 90+2'; Rabiot (yellow card) 90+3'	Stadium: Stadio Arechi; Attendance: 29,405; Referee: Marco Guida

16 January 2024 20	Juventus	3–0	Sassuolo	Turin
20:45 CET (UTC+1)	Vlahović 15', 37'; Chiesa 89'	Report	Erlić (yellow card) 42'; Ferrari (yellow card) 64'	Stadium: Juventus Stadium; Attendance: 39,005; Referee: Marco Piccinini

21 January 2024 21	Lecce	0–3	Juventus	Lecce
20:45 CET (UTC+1)	Kaba (yellow card) 89'	Report	McKennie (yellow card) 22'; Vlahović 59', 68'; Bremer 85'	Stadium: Stadio Via del mare Attendance: 28,074; Referee: Daniele Doveri

27 January 2024 22	Juventus	1–1	Empoli	Turin
18:00 CET (UTC+1)	Milik (red card) 16'; Vlahović 50'; Weah (yellow card) 90+3'	Report	Walukiewicz (yellow card) 20'; Baldanzi 70'	Stadium: Juventus Stadium; Attendance: 39,518; Referee: Livio Marinelli

4 February 2024 23	Internazionale	1–0	Juventus	Milan
20:45 CET (UTC+1)	Gatti 37' (o.g.); Mkhitaryan (yellow card) 51'; Thuram (yellow card) 77'	Report	Vlahović (yellow card) 19'; Danilo (yellow card) 33'	Stadium: San Siro; Attendance: 75,547; Referee: Fabio Maresca

12 February 2024 24	Juventus	0–1	Udinese	Turin
20:45 CET (UTC+1)	Bremer (yellow card) 38'; Gatti (yellow card) 74'; Nicolussi Caviglia (yellow card) 90+2'	Report	Ehizibue (yellow card) 10'; Gianetti 25'; Walace (yellow card) 82'; Success (yellow card) 89'	Stadium: Juventus Stadium; Attendance: 38,856; Referee: Rosario Abisso

17 February 2024 25	Hellas Verona	2–2	Juventus	Verona
18:00 CET (UTC+1)	Folorunsho 11'; Noslin 52'	Report	Vlahović 28' (pen.); Rabiot 55'	Stadium: Stadio Marcantonio Bentegodi; Attendance: 26,948; Referee: Marco Di Bello

25 February 2024 26	Juventus	3–2	Frosinone	Turin
12:30 CET (UTC+1)	Vlahović 3', 32'; Bremer (yellow card) 7'; Locatelli (yellow card) 71'; Rugani 90+5'	Report	Cheddira 14'; Brescianini 27'; Valeri (yellow card) 64'; Cerofolini (yellow card) 70'	Stadium: Juventus Stadium; Attendance: 40,719; Referee: Antonio Rapuano

3 March 2024 27	Napoli	2–1	Juventus	Naples
20:45 CET (UTC+1)	Kvaratskhelia 42'; Traorè (yellow card) 47'; Osimhen (penalty missed) 88'; Raspadori 88'	Report	Vlahović (yellow card) 18'; Bremer (yellow card) 26'; Cambiaso (yellow card) 28'; Chiesa 81'; Nonge (yellow card) 86'	Stadium: Stadio Diego Armando Maradona; Attendance: 52,000; Referee: Maurizio Mariani

10 March 2024 28	Juventus	2–2	Atalanta	Turin
18:00 CET (UTC+1)	Cambiaso 66'; Milik 70'	Report	Koopmeiners 35', 75'; Hateboer (yellow card) 90+3'	Stadium: Juventus Stadium; Attendance: 39,206; Referee: Marco Guida

17 March 2024 29	Juventus	0–0	Genoa	Turin
12:30 CET (UTC+1)	Danilo (yellow card) 39'; Cambiaso (yellow card) 58'; Vlahović (yellow card) 90+2' (yellow-red card) 90+3'	Report	Vitinha (yellow card) 65'	Stadium: Juventus Stadium; Attendance: 40,098; Referee: Antonio Giua

30 March 2024 30	Lazio	1–0	Juventus	Rome
18:00 CET (UTC+1)	Immobile (yellow card) 90+1'; Marušić 90+3'	Report	Iling-Junior (yellow card) 71'; Weah (yellow card) 75'	Stadium: Stadio Olimpico; Attendance: 57,000; Referee: Andrea Colombo

7 April 2024 31	Juventus	1–0	Fiorentina	Turin
20:45 CEST (UTC+2)	Gatti 21'; Cambiaso (yellow card) 69'; Yıldız (yellow card) 87'	Report	Beltrán (yellow card) 90+3'	Stadium: Juventus Stadium; Attendance: 37,994; Referee: Federico La Penna

13 April 2024 32	Torino	0–0	Juventus	Turin
18:00 CEST (UTC+2)	Ricci (yellow card) 45+3'; Vojvoda (yellow card) 45+4'; Linetty (yellow card) 76'	Report	Gatti (yellow card) 44'; Cambiaso (yellow card) 70'	Stadium: Stadio Olimpico Grande Torino; Attendance: 27,788; Referee: Fabio Maresca

19 April 2024 33	Cagliari	2–2	Juventus	Cagliari
20:45 CEST (UTC+2)	Gaetano 30' (pen.); Mina 36' (pen.); Luvumbo (yellow card) 45+2'; Nández (yellow card) 60'	Report	Szczęsny (yellow card) 35'; Weah (yellow card) 45+2'; Bremer (yellow card) 48'; Vlahović 61'; Dossena 87' (o.g.)	Stadium: Unipol Domus; Attendance: 16,179; Referee: Marco Piccinini

27 April 2024 34	Juventus	0–0	Milan	Turin
18:00 CEST (UTC+2)		Report	Musah (yellow card) 45+1'	Stadium: Juventus Stadium; Attendance: 39,845; Referee: Maurizio Mariani

5 May 2024 35	Roma	1–1	Juventus	Rome
20:45 CEST (UTC+2)	Lukaku 15'; Abraham (yellow card) 84'	Report	Weah (yellow card) 4'; Bremer 31'; Rabiot (yellow card) 71'	Stadium: Stadio Olimpico; Attendance: 63,996; Referee: Andrea Colombo

12 May 2024 36	Juventus	1–1	Salernitana	Turin
18:00 CEST (UTC+2)	Vlahović (yellow card) 22'; Rabiot (yellow card) 25', (goal) 90+1'	Report	Pierozzi 27'; Zanoli (yellow card) 68'; Sambia (yellow card) 85'; Fiorillo (yellow card) 88'; Pasalidis (yellow card) 90+3'; Bašić (yellow card) 90+7'	Stadium: Juventus Stadium; Attendance: 37,470; Referee: Alberto Santoro

20 May 2024 37	Bologna	3–3	Juventus	Bologna
20:45 CEST (UTC+2)	Calafiori 2', 53'; Castro 11'; Aebischer (yellow card) 82'	Report	Miretti (yellow card) 26'; Cambiaso (yellow card) 29'; Danilo (yellow card) 62'; Bremer (yellow card) 68'; Chiesa 76'; Milik 83'; Yıldız 84'; Fagioli (yellow card) 90'	Stadium: Stadio Renato Dall'Ara; Attendance: 29,603; Referee: Giovanni Ayroldi

25 May 2024 38	Juventus	2–0	Monza	Turin
18:00 CEST (UTC+2)	Chiesa 26'; Alex Sandro 28'; Yıldız (yellow card) 63'	Report	Carboni (yellow card) 38'; Zerbin (yellow card) 67' (yellow-red card) 90'	Stadium: Juventus Stadium; Attendance: 38,165; Referee: Maria Sole Ferrieri Caputi

=== Coppa Italia ===
4 January 2024 Round of 16	Juventus	6–1	Salernitana	Turin
21:00 CET (UTC+1)	Miretti 12'; Cambiaso 35'; Rugani 54'; Bronn 75' (o.g.); Yıldız 88'; Weah 90+1'	Report	Ikwuemesi 1'; Maggiore (yellow card) 40'	Stadium: Juventus Stadium; Attendance: 40,548; Referee: Davide Ghersini

11 January 2024 Quarter-finals	Juventus	4–0	Frosinone	Turin
21:00 CET (UTC+1)	Milik 11' (pen.), 38', 48'; Locatelli (yellow card) 20'; Kostić (yellow card) 32'; Yıldız 61'; Gatti (yellow card) 72'	Report		Stadium: Juventus Stadium; Attendance: 37,940; Referee: Juan Luca Sacchi

2 April 2024 Semi-finals; First leg	Juventus	2–0	Lazio	Turin
21:00 CEST (UTC+2)	Gatti (yellow card) 37'; Chiesa 50'; Vlahović 64'; Weah (yellow card) 85'	Report		Stadium: Juventus Stadium; Attendance: 39,056; Referee: Davide Massa

23 April 2024 Semi-finals; Second leg	Lazio	2–1 (2–3 agg.)	Juventus	Rome
21:00 CEST (UTC+2)	Castellanos 12', 48'	Report	Locatelli (yellow card) 34'; Milik 83'	Stadium: Stadio Olimpico; Attendance: 40,076; Referee: Daniele Orsato

15 May 2024 Final	Atalanta	0–1	Juventus	Rome
21:00 CEST (UTC+2)	Hien (yellow card) 17'; Djimsiti (yellow card) 78'; Tolói (yellow card) 90+6'	Report	Vlahović 4', (yellow card) 56'; Bremer (yellow card) 90+1'	Stadium: Stadio Olimpico; Attendance: 66,854; Referee: Fabio Maresca

== Statistics ==
=== Appearances and goals ===
No.	Pos	Nat	Player	Total		Serie A		Coppa Italia	
No.	Pos	Nat	Player	Apps	Goals	Apps	Goals	Apps	Goals
Goalkeepers
1	GK	(Poland) POL	Wojciech Szczęsny	35	0	35	0	0	0
23	GK	(Italy) ITA	Carlo Pinsoglio	1	0	0+1	0	0	0
36	GK	(Italy) ITA	Mattia Perin	8	0	3	0	5	0
Defenders
2	DF	(Italy) ITA	Mattia De Sciglio	1	0	1	0	0	0
3	DF	(Brazil) BRA	Bremer	40	3	36	3	4	0
4	DF	(Italy) ITA	Federico Gatti	36	4	30+2	4	4	0
6	DF	(Brazil) BRA	Danilo	34	1	27+2	1	5	0
12	DF	(Brazil) BRA	Alex Sandro	18	1	8+8	1	1+1	0
24	DF	(Italy) ITA	Daniele Rugani	17	3	13+3	2	1	1
27	DF	(Italy) ITA	Andrea Cambiaso	38	3	27+6	2	4+1	1
33	DF	(Portugal) POR	Tiago Djaló	1	0	0+1	0	0	0
Midfielders
5	MF	(Italy) ITA	Manuel Locatelli	39	1	33+2	1	4	0
10	MF	(France) FRA	Paul Pogba	2	0	0+2	0	0	0
11	MF	(Serbia) SRB	Filip Kostić	33	0	26+3	0	3+1	0
16	MF	(United States) USA	Weston McKennie	38	0	29+5	0	4	0
20	MF	(Italy) ITA	Fabio Miretti	27	2	15+9	1	2+1	1
21	MF	(Italy) ITA	Nicolò Fagioli	7	0	4+3	0	0	0
22	MF	(United States) USA	Timothy Weah	35	1	12+18	0	1+4	1
25	MF	(France) FRA	Adrien Rabiot	35	5	30+1	5	4	0
26	MF	(Argentina) ARG	Carlos Alcaraz	12	0	3+7	0	0+2	0
39	MF	(Italy) ITA	Nikola Sekulov	1	0	0+1	0	0	0
41	MF	(Italy) ITA	Hans Nicolussi Caviglia	9	0	3+4	0	1+1	0
47	MF	(Belgium) BEL	Joseph Nonge	4	0	0+2	0	0+2	0
Forwards
7	FW	(Italy) ITA	Federico Chiesa	36	10	25+7	9	4	1
9	FW	(Serbia) SRB	Dušan Vlahović	38	18	27+6	16	3+2	2
14	FW	(Poland) POL	Arkadiusz Milik	35	8	7+24	4	2+2	4
15	FW	(Turkey) TUR	Kenan Yıldız	32	4	9+18	2	1+4	2
17	FW	(England) ENG	Samuel Iling-Junior	26	1	4+19	1	2+1	0
18	FW	(Italy) ITA	Moise Kean	20	0	8+11	0	0+1	0
45	FW	(Italy) ITA	Leonardo Cerri	1	0	0+1	0	0	0
Players transferred during the season
13	DF	(Spain) ESP	Dean Huijsen	1	0	0+1	0	0	0
26	FW	(Brazil) BRA	Kaio Jorge	0	0	0	0	0	0
30	FW	(Argentina) ARG	Matías Soulé	0	0	0	0	0	0

=== Goalscorers ===
Rank	No.	Pos.	Player	Serie A	Coppa Italia	Total
1	9	FW	(Serbia) Dušan Vlahović	16	2	18
2	7	FW	(Italy) Federico Chiesa	9	1	10
3	14	FW	(Poland) Arkadiusz Milik	4	4	8
4	25	MF	(France) Adrien Rabiot	5	0	5
5	4	DF	(Italy) Federico Gatti	4	0	4
5	15	FW	(Turkey) Kenan Yıldız	2	2	4
7	3	DF	(Brazil) Bremer	3	0	3
7	24	DF	(Italy) Daniele Rugani	2	1	3
7	27	DF	(Italy) Andrea Cambiaso	2	1	3
10	20	MF	(Italy) Fabio Miretti	1	1	2
11	5	MF	(Italy) Manuel Locatelli	1	0	1
11	6	DF	(Brazil) Danilo	1	0	1
11	6	DF	(Brazil) Alex Sandro	1	0	1
11	17	FW	(England) Samuel Iling-Junior	1	0	1
11	22	MF	(United States) Timothy Weah	0	1	1
Own goals				2	1	3
Totals				54	14	68

== See also ==
- 2023–24 Juventus Next Gen season
