= Valle d'Aosta Calcio (disambiguation) =

Valle d'Aosta Calcio may refer to one of the sports clubs of the region:

- A.S.D. Vallée d’Aoste Charvensod, team now plays in Promozione Piedmont and Aosta Valley, self-claimed heir of Valle d'Aosta Calcio.
- Valle d'Aosta Calcio, based in Aosta whose origins go back to 1911 and bankrupted in 2010.
- Saint-Christophe Vallée d’Aoste, team was founded in 1971 and plays in 2012–13 Lega Pro Seconda Divisione, self-claimed to represent the whole valley.
