= Angelo Turconi =

Italian footballer (1923–2011)

Personal information
- Date of birth: 5 July 1923
- Place of birth: Solbiate Olona, Italy
- Date of death: 3 August 2011 (aged 88)
- Place of death: Busto Arsizio, Italy
- Position: Midfielder

Senior career*
| Years | Team | Apps | (Gls) |
| 1940–1942 | Pro Patria | 50 | (16) |
| 1942–1943 | Liguria | 2 | (1) |
| 1943–1944 | → Varese | 18 | (6) |
| 1944 | → Pro Patria | 12 | (5) |
| 1945–1950 | Pro Patria | 174 | (56) |
| 1950–1954 | Como | 106 | (21) |
| 1954–1955 | Palermo | 16 | (6) |
| 1955–1957 | Sanremo | 46 | (10) |
| 1957–1958 | Pro Patria | 24 | (1) |
| 1958–1959 | Borgomanero | ? | (?) |

International career
| 1948 | Italy | 2 | (1) |

Managerial career
- 1961–1962: Borgomanero
- 1964–1965: Verbania
- 1965–1967: Pro Patria
- 1968–1969: Verbania
- 1970–1971: Borgomanero
- 1971–1972: Pro Patria
- * Club domestic league appearances and goals

Angelo Turconi (Italian pronunciation: [ˈandʒelo turˈkoːni]; 5 July 1923 – 3 August 2011) was an Italian footballer who played as a midfielder. He competed in the men's tournament at the 1948 Summer Olympics.
