= Federico Gatti =

Italian footballer (born 1998)

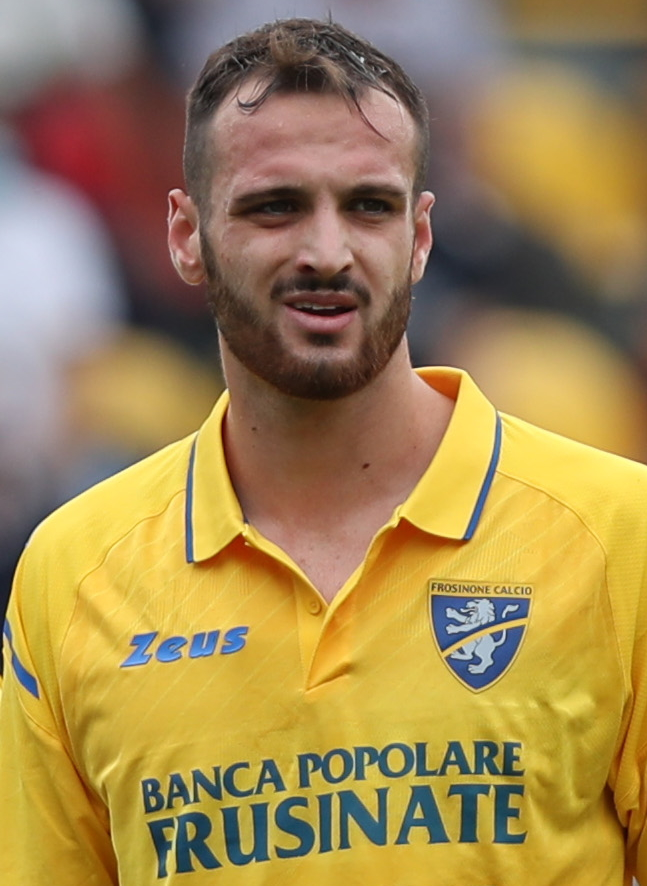
- Gatti with Frosinone in 2021

Personal information
- Full name: Federico Gatti
- Date of birth: 24 June 1998 (age 28)
- Place of birth: Rivoli, Italy
- Height: 1.90 m (6 ft 3 in)
- Position: Centre-back

Team information
- Current team: Juventus
- Number: 4

Youth career
- 2004–2005: Chieri
- 2005–2012: Torino
- 2012–2014: Alessandria

Senior career*
Years	Team	Apps	(Gls)
2014–2017	Alessandria	0	(0)
2014–2016	→ Pavarolo (loan)	31	(3)
2016–2017	→ Saluzzo (loan)	4	(0)
2017–2018	Pavarolo	47	(13)
2018–2020	Verbania	51	(6)
2020–2021	Pro Patria	34	(1)
2021–2022	Frosinone	35	(5)
2022–	Juventus	101	(7)

International career^{‡}
2022–	Italy	8	(0)
- * Club domestic league appearances and goals as of 23:12, 24 May 2026 (UTC) ‡ National team caps and goals as of 23:09, 31 March 2026 (UTC)

Federico Gatti (born 24 June 1998) is an Italian professional footballer who plays as a centre-back for Serie A club Juventus and the Italy national team.

In his youth career, Gatti played for the clubs Chieri, Torino and Alessandria. Gatti's senior career began in February 2015, when he joined the Promozione team Pavarolo, who gained promotion to Eccellenza in the next season. In mid-2016, Gatti joined Saluzzo but returned to Pavarolo six months later. Gatti remained at Pavarolo until 2018, when he changed his position from midfielder to defender during the last matches of the season. He then moved to Verbania, who won the Eccellenza title and were promoted to Serie D in the 2018–19 season. Gatti made his professional debut with Serie C side Pro Patria, and he joined Serie B side Frosinone the following year. In January 2022, Gatti joined Juventus, who loaned him back to Frosinone until the end of the season.

Gatti did not represent Italy at youth levels, and he won his first senior team cap in 2022. Two years later, he was also selected for the UEFA Euro 2024 final squad.

== Club career ==
=== Youth career ===
In 2005, aged seven, Federico Gatti played in a friendly match for Chieri against Torino; Giorgio Boscarato, Torino's sporting observer, noted his talent as a trequartista and reported him to Silvano Benedetti, the Torino Youth Sector sporting director who ultimately signed him. Gatti was promoted to the under-15s side before moving on to Alessandria's youth team. Gatti spent the 2012–13 and 2013–14 seasons with the club's under-15s (Giovanissimi Nazionali) side and with the under-17s (Allievi) team.

Throughout his youth career, Gatti was not considered by Torino nor by Alessandria. Gatti was sent on loan to Pavarolo in the 2014–15 season. Instead of playing with the under-17s side, Gatti spent most of the season playing for the under-19s (Juniores) team, with whom he scored 13 goals in 18 league appearances despite being only 17 years old.

=== Amateur career ===
In February 2015, Federico Gatti debuted with the Pavarolo first team, with whom he made four appearances that season. The following season, Gatti was promoted to the first team and scored three goals in 27 Promozione appearances; he also won the award for the Best Youth Player of the season. His side were also promoted to Eccellenza, having won the Coppa Italia Promozione Piemonte–Valle d'Aosta.

In 2016, Alessandria loaned Gatti to Saluzzo but not having found much space, Gatti returned to Pavarolo in mid-January 2017. At the end of the season, Pavarolo avoided relegation to Promozione. During the 2016–17 season, Gatti scored eight goals in 31 league appearances.

In the following season (2017–18), due to financial problems, Pavarolo could not pay its players so the most-experienced players decided not to train or play in the last 10 league matches, and the under-19s team were promoted to the first team. Because Gatti was the tallest player on the squad, he changed his position from midfielder to defender. Gatti's side were relegated to Promozione at the end of the season.

Verbania were impressed by Gatti's performances as a defender in a match against them, and they purchased him on a permanent contract in 2018. Gatti scored one goal in 34 league appearances and Verbania won the Eccellenza title. Gatti impressed Serie C side Cavese, who tried to purchase him but did not. In the following season (2019–20), Gatti scored three goals in 22 Serie D appearances prior to the interruption caused by the COVID-19 pandemic in Italy, and his side were relegated to Eccellenza.

=== Pro Patria and Frosinone ===
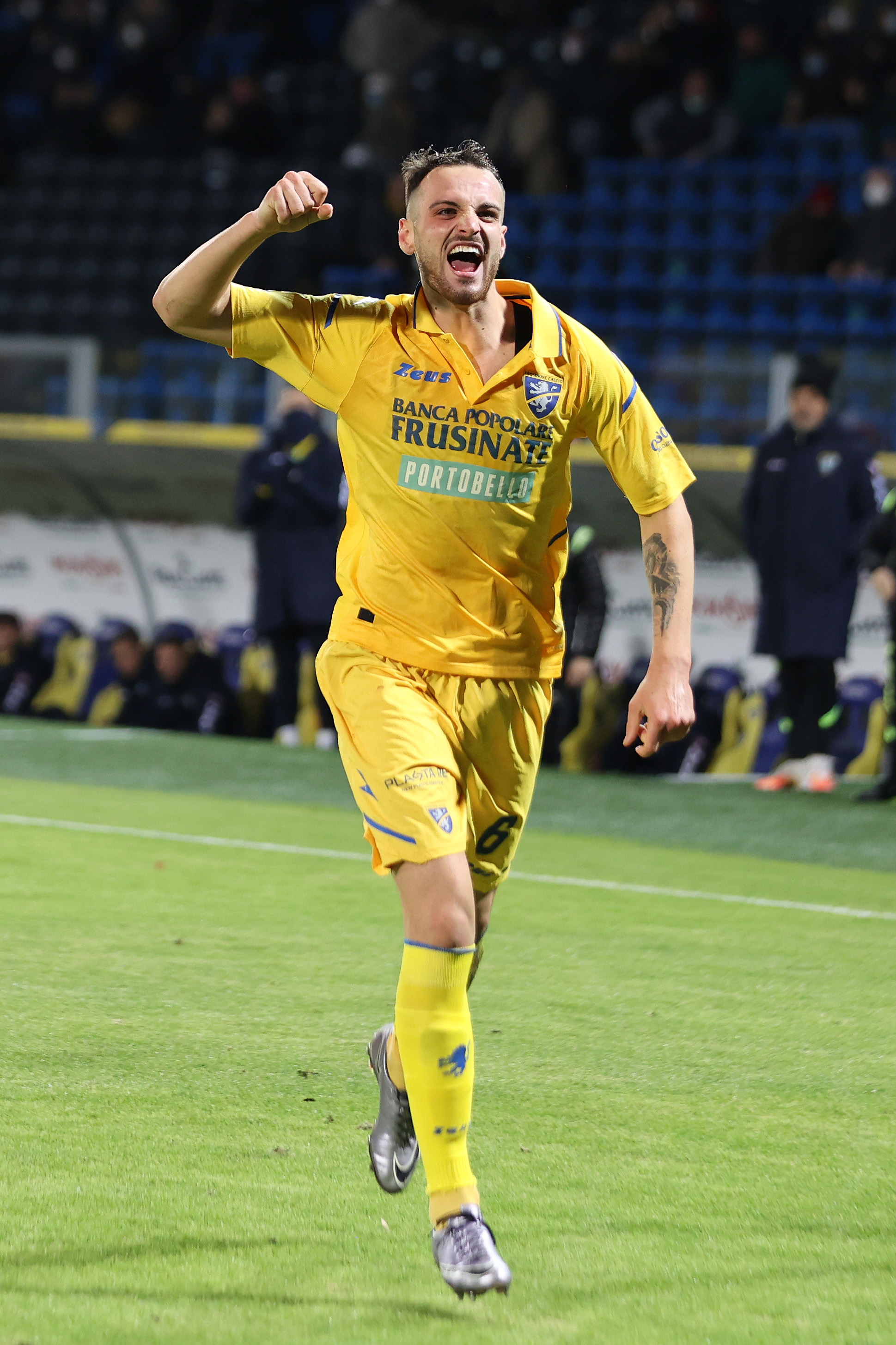
Gatti celebrating his brace against SPAL on 18 December 2021

In mid-2020, Gatti became a professional player and signed to Serie C side Pro Patria. On 30 September, he debuted for Pro Patria in a 3–2 second-round Coppa Italia match that was lost against Vicenza after extra time. Gatti's first Serie C match was on 4 October, a 1–1 draw with Pro Vercelli. His only goal for Pro Patria came on 3 April 2021, which allowed his team to win 1–0 against Lecco. On 9 May, Gatti played his last game of the season in a Serie C promotion play-off match against Juventus U23—the reserve team of Juventus—in a match lost 3–1 at home, causing Pro Patria's elimination from the play-offs in the first round. During the season, Gatti played 36 matches, almost all of them 90 minutes long.

Gatti moved to Serie B side Frosinone in 2021, signing a four-year contract for a fee of €250,000. Gatti made his debut on 15 August in the Coppa Italia first-round match against Venezia, which finished 1–1 and Gatti missed his penalty in the penalty shoot-out, losing 8–7. Gatti's Serie B debut came on 20 August, in which he played as a starter in a 2–2 draw against Parma. Gatti's first goal for Frosinone came on 23 October in a 2–1 win against Ascoli. On 4 December, Gatti was sent off after twice being yellow carded in two minutes of an eventual 1–1 draw against Ternana. Gatti's returned to the pitch after his one-match suspension caused by a red card on 18 December in Frosinone's 4–0 win against SPAL, in which he scored two goals.

"[Gatti] is the best defender of the Serie B and [he] has the characteristics to stay at Juve in the future."

— Massimiliano Allegri on Gatti in a pre-match press conference, 5 February 2022

Gatti had been close to a transfer move to Turin rivals Torino FC before Juventus entered the negotiations and bought him on 31 January 2022 in a four-and-a-half-year deal for a fee of €7.5 million plus €2.5 million in performance-related bonuses. After signing Gatti, Juventus promptly loaned him back to Frosinone for the rest of the season. Gatti finished the season with five goals scored in 36 matches in all competitions; he also received 13 yellow cards. He started matches 35 times and all of his appearances, except for the match against Ternana in which he was red-carded, were 90 minutes long. On 17 October, he received the Serie B Footballer of the Year award for the 2021–22 Serie B.

=== Juventus ===
Gatti made his Juventus and Serie A debut on 31 August 2022 against Spezia, winning 2–0. On 25 October, he made his Champions League debut in a 4–3 defeat against Benfica. On 13 April 2023, he scored his first goal for the team, in the first leg of the Europa League quarter-finals against Sporting CP, allowing his team win 1–0. Gatti praised manager Massimiliano Allegri for helping him develop at Juventus and becoming a regular starter during the 23/24 season.

Gatti extended his contract with Juventus in the summer of 2025 until the summer of 2030, despite interest by English clubs Newcastle and Nottingham Forest. On 25 February 2025 he scored against Galatasaray S.K. in the Champions League Knockout phase play-offs; Juventus lost 7-5 on aggregate.

== International career ==
In May 2022, coach of the Italy national football team Roberto Mancini called Gatti up for a three-day training camp in Coverciano. Gatti debuted on 11 June as a starter in a UEFA Nations League match against England. The match ended in a goalless draw, and Gatti was considered to have played like "a veteran" by Italian newspaper Corriere della Sera in the post-match report. On 3 June 2024, Gatti was called up to the preliminary squad for the UEFA Euro 2024, replacing the injured Giorgio Scalvini.

== Style of play ==
Gatti is a robust, right-footed, centre-back who is 1.90 m (6 ft 3 in) tall. According to Andrea Gigante writing for 90min.com, attributed Gatti's technique and vision to previous experience as a midfielder; he also has a strong personality and is strong in the air. According to Domenico Marchese writing for La Repubblica, Gatti excels at man-to-man marking. According to Pro Patria sporting director Sandro Turotti, Gatti can play in a four-man defence and can also play centre-right in a three-man defence as he did for Pro Patria.

== Personal life ==
Gatti is an only child; his father Ludovico was a sporting director during his experience at Pavarolo.

At the age of 17, Federico Gatti left school and started working, following his father's unemployment. Gatti worked as a bricklayer and as a window manufacturer, repaired roofs and worked at markets for nine to ten hours a day until 2018. Gatti would train in the evenings, having dinner at 23:00 and would get up between 03:00 and 04:00. Gatti's career has also been compared to that of Moreno Torricelli, who played amateur football and was a joiner before signing with Juventus in 1992.

Gatti considers Juventus' defender Giorgio Chiellini as his idol. Prior to switching positions from midfielder to defender, Frank Lampard, Steven Gerrard, Adel Taarabt and Radja Nainggolan had been his inspirations.

== Career statistics ==
=== Club ===
As of match played 24 May 2026

Appearances and goals by club, season and competition
Club	Season	League			Coppa Italia		Europe		Other		Total	
Club	Season	Division	Apps	Goals	Apps	Goals	Apps	Goals	Apps	Goals	Apps	Goals
Alessandria	2014–15	Lega Pro	0	0	—		—		0	0	0	0
Pavarolo (loan)	2014–15	Promozione	4	0	—		—		0	0	4	0
Pavarolo (loan)	2015–16	Promozione	27	3	—		—		0	0	27	3
Pavarolo (loan)	Total		31	3	0	0	0	0	0	0	31	3
Saluzzo (loan)	2016–17	Eccellenza	4	0	—		—		0	0	4	0
Pavarolo (loan)	2016–17	Eccellenza	15	5	—		—		0	0	0	0
Pavarolo	2017–18	Eccellenza	32	7	—		—		0	0	27	7
Verbania	2018–19	Eccellenza	29	3	—		—		0	0	29	3
Verbania	2019–20	Serie D	22	3	—		—		0	0	22	3
Verbania	Total		51	6	0	0	0	0	0	0	51	6
Pro Patria	2020–21	Serie C	34	1	1	0	—		1 (Note: Appearance in Serie C promotion play-offs)	0	36	1
Frosinone	2021–22 (Note: Part of this season was spent on loan from Juventus)	Serie B	35	5	1	0	—		—		36	5
Juventus	2022–23	Serie A	18	0	2	0	7 (Note: Two appearances in UEFA Champions League, five appearances and two goals in UEFA Europa League)	2	—		27	2
Juventus	2023–24	Serie A	32	4	4	0	—		—		36	4
Juventus	2024–25	Serie A	30	1	2	0	9 (Note: Appearances in UEFA Champions League)	0	5 (Note: One appearance in Supercoppa Italiana, four appearances in FIFA Club World Cup)	0	46	1
Juventus	2025–26	Serie A	21	2	2	0	5	2	—		28	4
Juventus	Total		101	7	10	0	21	4	5	0	137	11
Career total			304	34	12	0	21	4	6	0	342	38

=== International ===
As of match played 31 March 2026

Appearances and goals by national team and year
National team	Year	Apps	Goals
Italy	2022	2	0
Italy	2023	1	0
Italy	2024	2	0
Italy	2025	1	0
Italy	2026	2	0
Total		8	0

== Honours ==
Pavarolo

- Coppa Italia Promozione Piemonte–Valle d'Aosta: 2015–16

Verbania

- Eccellenza Group A: 2018–19

Juventus

- Coppa Italia: 2023–24

Individual

- Serie B Footballer of the Year: 2021–22
- Premio Nazionale Carriare Esemplare "Gaetano Scirea": 2022
