= Alessandro Bernardini =

Italian footballer (born 1987)

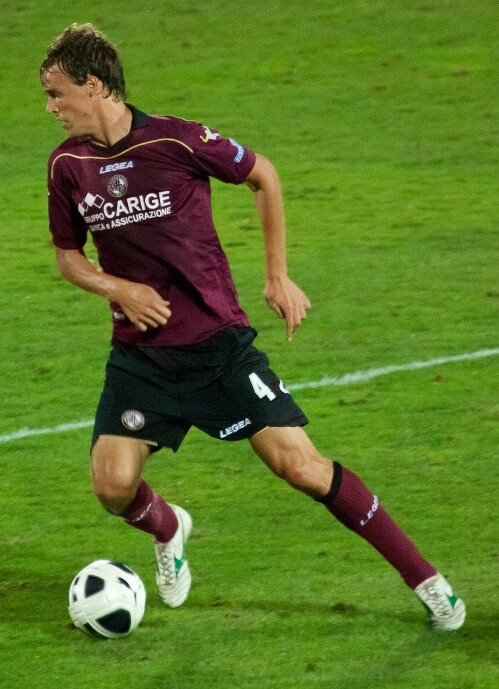

Personal information
- Date of birth: 21 January 1987 (age 39)
- Place of birth: Domodossola, Italy
- Height: 1.89 m (6 ft 2 1/2 in)
- Position: Defender

Youth career
- –2004: Verbania
- 2003–2004: → Parma (loan)
- 2004–2006: Parma

Senior career*
Years	Team	Apps	(Gls)
2006–2008	Borgomanero	61	(2)
2008–2010	Varese	42	(1)
2010–2015	Livorno	135	(2)
2013–2014	→ Chievo (loan)	13	(0)
2015–2019	Salernitana	74	(1)
Total		325	(6)
- * Club domestic league appearances and goals

Alessandro Bernardini (born 21 January 1987) is an Italian former footballer who played as a defender.

== Career ==
=== Youth & Serie D ===
Born in Domodossola, Province of Verbano-Cusio-Ossola, Bernardini started his youth career at the provincial capital Verbania. He then signed a youth contract with Parma, where he played three seasons.

In summer 2006, he left for the non-professional side Borgomanero in his home region Piedmont. He played 61 league matches and scored two goals.

=== Varese ===
He signed his first professional contract with Varese in summer 2008. In his second season, he became the definite starter, only missed two out of 20 league matches, while he missed the latter by being sent off in a Round 18 rescheduled match against Perugia on 13 January 2010, which was also his late match. He also played both two Coppa Italia match as stater, which were lost to Frosinone Calcio of Serie B in penalty shootout.

=== Livorno ===
After being suspended on 17 January 2010 against Arezzo, he joined Serie A struggler Livorno in a co-ownership deal with Varese on 19 January 2010. He was presented along with another new player Andrea Esposito. Co-current with their arrival, Federico Dionisi, who only played three league matches this season, left the club on loan.

After the end of Serie A, he was borrowed by Juventus for the US tour, along with teammate Francesco Bardi and two other players.

=== Salernitana ===
On 18 July 2019, his contract with Salernitana was terminated by mutual consent.
