= Matteo Cavagna (footballer, born 1985) =

Italian footballer

Personal information
- Full name: Matteo Sergio Cavagna
- Date of birth: 22 September 1985 (age 41)
- Place of birth: Turin, Italy
- Height: 1.77 m (5 ft 9 1/2 in)
- Position: Midfielder

Youth career
- Juventus

Senior career*
Years	Team	Apps	(Gls)
2004–2005	Juventus	0	(0)
2005–2010	Ravenna	81	(7)
2007–2008	→ Pro Sesto (loan)	17	(0)
2011–2017	Prato	151	(5)
2017	→ Lupa Roma (loan)	4	(0)
2017–2018	Albese		
- * Club domestic league appearances and goals as of 18 February 2018

Matteo Sergio Cavagna (born 22 September 1985) is an Italian footballer who plays as a midfielder for Albese.

== Career ==
A former Juventus youth product, in the summer of 2005, Cavagna left for Ravenna in a co-ownership deal, for a nominal fees of €500. After Ravenna won the Serie C1 Group B Championship in 2007, Cavagna was loaned to Pro Sesto of Serie C1.

In June 2009 Ravenna purchase the remaining 50% registration rights of Cavagna. In 2011, he was signed by A.C. Prato.

On 7 July 2014 Cavagna signed a new 3-year contract with the club.

On 27 January 2017 Cavagna left for Lupa Roma F.C. in a temporary deal, with Tommaso Ceccarelli moved to opposite direction.

On 6 December 2017, Cavagna signed for Albese Calcio.

== Honours ==
Ravenna

- Serie C1 (Group B): 2006–07
