= 1941–42 Prima Divisione =

1941–42 Italian amateur league

The Prima Divisione 1941–42 was the seventh edition of the amatorial Regional First Division of football played in Italy.

== Competition ==
During the 1930s, football under the Serie C was only regional and amatorial. Each of the 18 regions of Italy of that time could manage its one championship whose winner was promoted to C.

However, only 15 out of the 18 regions received sufficient inscriptions to activate a tournament. Lombardy and the other regions of Northern Italy, the richest and strongest ones, maintained additional spots.

Relegated from C:

- AC Monza

== Regional winners ==
- Piedmont: Lancia Torino (disbanded), Settimese
- Lombardy: Vogherese, FBC Saronno, Caproni Milan, AC Codogno 1908
- Veneto: Pro Mogliano, Pellizzari Arzignano
- Trentino-Alto Adige/Südtirol: Lancia Bozen (withdrew)
- Julian March: 94th Army Trieste, Magazzini Rijeka
- Liguria: Novese, Villafranca Luni
- Emilia: Trancerie Mossina, GIL San Pietro (withdrew)
- Tuscany: Richard Ginori (disbanded)
- Marche: Andreanelli Ancona
- Umbria: Spoleto
- Latium: Littorio Rome
- Abruzzo: Lancianese (withdrew)
- Campania: Acerrana (disbanded)
- Apulia: Pietro Resta Taranto
- Sicily: Acilia Salemi (disbanded)

AC Monza and Vis Nova Giussano and Budrio and Cluana Civitanovese and Colleferro Calcio 1937 and Barletta and Pro Gioia and Avio Bari and Mariners Marsala and Nissena were later chosen by the FIGC to replace these disbanded clubs and to expand the upper league.

== References and sources ==
- Almanacco Illustrato del Calcio - La Storia 1898-2004, Panini Edizioni, Modena, September 2005
