= SSD Settimo Calcio =

Italian football club

Settimo
- Full name: Società Sportiva Dilettantistica Settimo Calcio A.R.L.
- Founded: 1912
- Ground: Stadio Renzo Valla, Settimo Torinese, Italy
- Chairman: Emiddio Ursilio and Piero Lovera (ad Honorem)
- Manager: Enea Benedetto
- League: Eccellenza Piedmont and Aosta Valley
- 2012–13: Eccellenza Piedmont and Aosta Valley/A, playout winners
| Home colours | Away colours |

Società Sportiva Dilettantistica Settimo Calcio is an Italian association football club, based in Settimo Torinese, Piedmont.

== History ==
The club was founded in 1912.

=== Serie D ===
In the season 2010–11, from Serie D group A it was relegated to Eccellenza Piedmont and Aosta Valley.

== Colors and badge ==
The team's colors are all-purple.
