= Andrea Bonetti =

Italian footballer (born 2003)

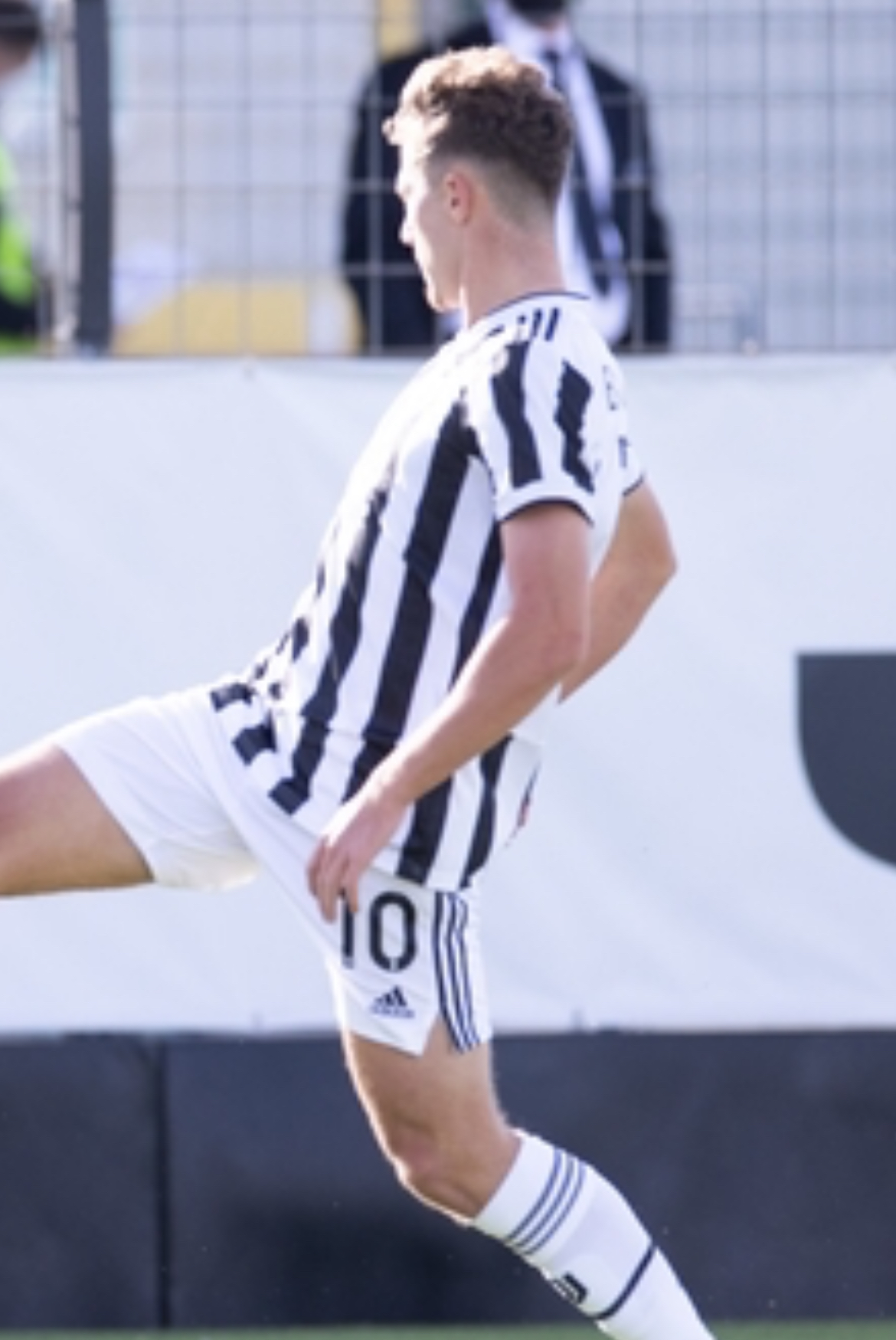

Personal information
- Date of birth: 8 August 2003 (age 23)
- Place of birth: Turin, Italy
- Position: Midfielder

Team information
- Current team: Renate
- Number: 17

Youth career
- Accademia Grugliasco
- Accademia Intertorino
- 2017–2022: Juventus

Senior career*
Years	Team	Apps	(Gls)
2022–2024	Juventus Next Gen	11	(0)
2023–2024	→ Taranto (loan)	2	(0)
2024–	Renate	59	(4)

International career
2018	Italy U15	9	(1)
2018–2019	Italy U16	5	(0)
2019–2020	Italy U17	2	(0)
- * Club domestic league appearances and goals as of 29 April 2026

Andrea Bonetti (born 8 August 2003) is an Italian footballer who plays as a midfielder for Serie C Group A club Renate.

== Club career ==
Having been born in Turin on 8 August 2003, Bonetti's first career years were at Accademia Grugliasco. He continued at Accademia Intertorino, where he attracted Juventus' attention, which he joined in 2017. Playing as a centre-forward, he was the most prolific Juventus U16 player of the 2018–19 season with 16 goals. With time, he moved down the pitch, becoming a midfielder able to play as a regista, a left mezz'ala and as a trequartista. In the 2021–22 season, which he played as a regista for the under-19 side, he scored five goals and gave five assists in 43 appearances in all competitions. On 9 October 2021, Juventus first-team manager Massimiliano Allegri played Bonetti for about 30 minutes, coming on as a substitute for Arthur Melo at the 63rd minute, in a friendly match against Alessandria, which they won 2–1. He made his Juventus Next Gen—the reserve team of Juventus—debut on 3 September 2022, in a 2–0 Serie C win against Trento, coming on as a substitute at the 64th minute for Enzo Barrenechea. His Next Gen debut as a starter came on 17 September, in Renate–Juventus Next Gen 3–2. He came off the pitch after 60 minutes for defender Félix Nzouango, when Next Gen were losing 3–0. On 3 November, he renewed with Juventus until 30 June 2025.

On 24 July 2023, Bonetti joined Taranto in Serie C on a season-long loan.

== International career ==
Bonetti played nine matches with Italy U15. His debut came on 15 February 2018 in a match against Netherlands U15 lost 2–0. On 29 April, he scored the winning goal in Italy–Mexico 1–0. He won five U16 caps between 2018 and 2019 and won two U17 caps between 2019 and 2020.

== Career statistics ==
As of match played 2 April 2023

Appearances and goals by club, season and competition
Club	Season	League			Coppa Italia		Other		Total	
Club	Season	Division	Apps	Goals	Apps	Goals	Apps	Goals	Apps	Goals
Juventus Next Gen	2022–23	Serie C	9	0	—		0	0	9	0
Career total			9	0	0	0	0	0	9	0
