= Tommaso Ceccarelli =

Italian footballer

Personal information
- Date of birth: 2 June 1992 (age 34)
- Place of birth: Rome, Italy
- Height: 1.78 m (5 ft 10 in)
- Positions: Winger; attacking midfielder

Youth career
- –2012: Lazio

Senior career*
Years	Team	Apps	(Gls)
2012–2014	Lazio	0	(0)
2012	→ Juve Stabia (loan)	2	(0)
2012–2013	→ Virtus Lanciano (loan)	3	(0)
2013–2014	→ Feralpisalò (loan)	28	(7)
2014–2016	L'Aquila	37	(3)
2016–2017	Lupa Roma	5	(0)
2017–2018	Prato	48	(12)
2018–2019	Monza	37	(5)
2019–2021	Feralpisalò	61	(10)
2021–2022	Catania	12	(0)
2022	Juve Stabia	13	(2)
2022–2023	Avellino	8	(0)
2023	→ Picerno (loan)	17	(3)
2023–2024	Picerno	20	(2)
2024–2025	Chieti	2	(0)
2025–2026	Ostiamare	19	(3)

International career
2008	Italy U17	4	(0)
- * Club domestic league appearances and goals as of 3 May 2026

Tommaso Ceccarelli (born 2 June 1992) is an Italian footballer who plays as a winger or attacking midfielder.

== Career ==
Ceccarelli scored 47 goals in two and a half years for Lazio's youth team and, while he trained with the senior team, did not make his professional debut until 2012, when he went on loan to Serie B side Juve Stabia.

On 1 September 2014, he was signed by L'Aquila.

In the summer of 2016, he was signed by Lupa Roma. On 27 January 2017, Ceccarelli moved to Prato, with Matteo Cavagna moving on loan in the opposite direction.

On 15 July 2019, he returned to Feralpisalò.

On 20 July 2021, he joined Catania. His contract with Catania was terminated by mutual consent on 15 January 2022.

On 20 January 2022, he returned to Juve Stabia.

On 10 August 2022, Ceccarelli signed a two-year contract with Avellino. On 5 January 2023, he was loaned by Picerno.

On 5 July 2023, Ceccarelli returned to Picerno on a two-year contract.
