= ASD Albese Calcio =

Italian football club

Albese
- Full name: Associazione Sportiva Dilettantistica Albese Calcio
- Founded: 1917
- Ground: Stadio San Cassiano, Alba, Italy
- Capacity: 2,050
- Chairman: Maxim Pioggia
- Manager: Luca Mezzano
- League: Eccellenza Piedmont-Aosta Valley
- 2013–14: Serie D/A, 14th (relegated after play-off)
Home colours	Away colours

Associazione Sportiva Dilettantistica Albese Calcio is an Italian association football club based in Alba, Piedmont, playing in Eccellenza Piedmont-Aosta Valley.

== History ==
Former logo of Albese

=== Foundation ===
The club was founded in 1917 as Unione Sportiva Albese.

=== 1920s and beginning of the rivalry with Cuneo ===
In the 1920s, Albese participated in several leagues Terza Divisione era and one of them won the record for best placement of the team, still undefeated in the season Terza Divisione 1924–1925 finishing in 2nd place just 2 points from promotion to the Seconda Divisione (now Serie B). Remain in history, for reasons not exactly sporting challenges Cuneo-Albese seasons of 1927–1928 and 1928–1929 championship in Seconda Divisione (the former Serie C). In the first two seasons of the above derby between La Fedelissima Sportiva Cuneese and Albese saw the first leg scheduled to Alba. Alba wins with a 2–0: to be reported primarily against the excesses of local fans, and Cuneo, after the match, the request to have Alba capital of the province.

Cuneo is the "revenge" (sporting speaking) in the second round by winning the challenge-rematch 1–0, playing, say the chronicles, with a grit and determination that allowed them to prevail on Albese is more technical: the success was the way to erase the shame of the defeat suffered leg and torn by the opposing party suffered from the public. Much warmer they were the derby next year, the 1928–1929. In both cases, the Cuneo always won 2–0 but the second leg played in Alba on 21 April 1929 he record moments of fear: the race of the players suspended for the brawl and the public, barrel field and fisticuffs in the stands. The Faithful Polisportiva Cuneo had been a 1–0 interval lead but by the end of the first half, the Bianconeri (these were the colors of the time) were accompanied by police and by the referee in the locker room. In the second installment of the second network host, a furious melee broke out in the field and the stands and a new invasion of the area. Captain of the police intervened in the person who imposed the suspension on the match race with the visiting team that gave up the sports Alba escorted by the Royal Military Police and the Militia.

=== From the 1930s to the 1970s and return to Serie C ===
The white and blue won the Championship Sezione Propaganda of Cuneo in 1939. At the end of the 1970–71 season, was promoted to Serie D where, after a year of adjustment, raced three seasons and last meeting (Serie D 1974–1975) centered on the long-awaited promotion Serie C. In recent years, the team played their home games at the stadium "Cinzano" Santa Vittoria d'Alba. In this championship was saved in the Serie C 1975–1976, but relegated the following year. In Serie C 1976–1977 went down in history for the record delayed an hour, the race-Albert Udinese played at 0–1 Michael Coppino networks Rai, the first case ever for a round of Series C, with commentary by Bruno Pizzul. However, in Serie D 1977–1978 finished third in and, thanks to the new formula of division championships with the C in C1 and C2, were promoted in the Serie C2.

=== 1980s and 1990s ===
The first year Serie C2 1978–1979 was positive, but in the Serie C2 1979–1980 came the relegation to Serie D, where it served in two successive seasons. So another relegation, this time in the Promozione where, after his second place came the success of the 1982–83 and 1983–84 shows that in the Interregional, where, however, was only two years since the end of Interregional Championships 1985–1986 it returned to the Promozione. From 1986/87 to 1989/90 it served in Promozione.

In the summer of 1990 was found again in Serie D, but at the end of the season, Interregional Championship 1990–1991 has dropped again. A new reform of the league championships grafts Eccellenza (including the Interregional and Promozione) that Albese has played from 1991–92 to 1993–94, when it is relegated to Promozione. In 1996, she was still fished in Eccellenza, where it played from 1996–97 to 1999–00 (relegation play-out).

=== 2000s and return to Serie D ===
In 2000–01 played in the Promozione, as well as in 2001–02, when it won the championship and returned to Eccellenza, from which however she retreats into the lower division by losing in the play-out at the end of the 2002–03 season. In 2003, the president Franco Rava and sports director Saviero Roman aim to achieve in five years the series diletantistica and in the 2007–08 season Albese dominates Group B of Eccellenza Piedmont and Aosta Valley, remained in the lead for 29 of 30 days, and centers for the promotion by beating Don Bosco Nichelino 1–0 on the last day and finishing the season in first place with 60 points, one more than the followers Castellazzo Bormida, thus returning to Serie D after 18 years. Lost the final to become a champion of Eccellenza Piedmont and Aosta Valley against Valle d'Aosta losing 0–1 away and 1–5 at home.

=== Relegation to Eccellenza and return to Serie D ===
In the 2011–12 season it was relegated from Serie D to Eccellenza. The next year Albese won promotion back to Serie D after finishing first in Eccellenza Piedmont and Aosta Valley.

== Squad ==
=== Current squad ===
As of 30 August 2017

Note: Flags indicate national team as defined under FIFA eligibility rules; some limited exceptions apply. Players may hold more than one non-FIFA nationality.

No.	Pos.	Nation	Player
—	GK	ITA	Andrea Tarantini
—	GK	ITA	Filippo Pagliano
—	DF	ITA	Alberto Grimaldi
—	DF	ITA	Luca Martinetti
—	DF	ALB	Julian Bregaji
—	DF	ITA	Edoardo Upinot
—	MF	ITA	Nicolò Buso

No.	Pos.	Nation	Player
—	MF	ALB	Anderson Abrazhda
—	MF	ITA	Alessandro Barbaro
—	MF	ITA	Gregorio Anania
—	FW	ITA	Jacopo di Marco
—	FW	ITA	Giancarlo Varvelli
—	FW	ITA	Moreno Novara
—	FW	ITA	Edoardo Rinaldi
