= Eccellenza Piedmont-Aosta Valley =

- Organising body: Lega Nazionale Dilettanti
- Founded: 1991
- Country: Italy
- Confederation: UEFA
- Divisions: 2
- Number of clubs: 32
- Promotion to: Serie D
- Relegation to: Promozione Piedmont-Aosta Valley
- League cup: Coppa Italia Dilettanti
- Current champions: Biellese (Group A); Valenzana (Group B) (2024–25)
- Most championships: Verbania (5 titles)
- Website: http://www.lnd.it

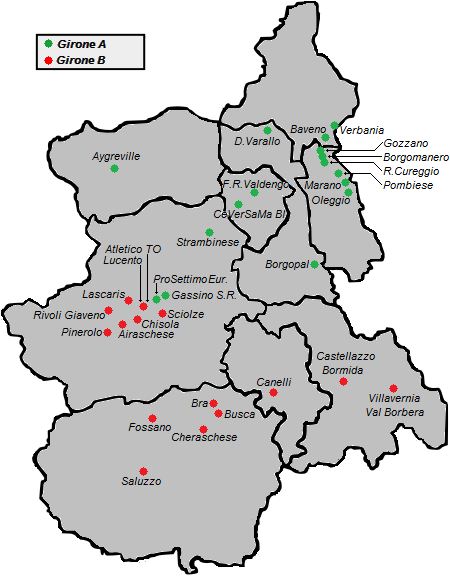
Eccellenza in 2010/2011

Eccellenza Piedmont-Aosta Valley (Italian: Eccellenza Piemonte-Valle d'Aosta) is the regional Eccellenza football division for clubs in the regions of Piedmont and Aosta Valley, Italy. It is competed amongst 36 teams, in two different groups (A and B). The winners of the Groups are promoted to Serie D. The clubs who finish second also have the chance to gain promotion, they are entered into a national play-off which consists of two rounds.

== Champions ==
Here are the past champions of the Piedmont-Aosta Valley Eccellenza, organised into their respective group.

=== Group A ===
- 1991–92 Châtillon SV
- 1992–93 Verbania
- 1993–94 Borgosesia
- 1994–95 Derthona
- 1995–96 Verbania
- 1996–97 Ivrea
- 1997–98 Sangiustese
- 1998–99 Volpiano
- 1999–2000 Gravellona
- 2000–01 Castellettese
- 2001–02 Cossatese
- 2002–03 Barengo Sparta
- 2003–04 Giaveno Coazze
- 2004–05 Alessandria
- 2005–06 Canelli
- 2006–07 Favria
- 2007–08 Valle d'Aosta
- 2008–09 Favria
- 2009–10 Vallée d’Aoste Saint-Christophe
- 2010–11 Gozzano
- 2011–12 Verbania
- 2012–13 Borgomanero
- 2013–14 Pro Settimo & Eureka
- 2014–15 Gozzano
- 2015–16 Virtus Verbania
- 2016–17 Borgaro
- 2017–18 Stresa
- 2018–19 ASDC Verbania
- 2019–20 Pont Donnaz Hone Arnad
- 2020–21 Romentino Galliate Ticino
- 2021–22 Stresa
- 2022–23 Romentino Galliate Ticino
- 2023–24 Borgaro
- 2024–25 Biellese

=== Group B ===
- 1991–92 Pinerolo
- 1992–93 Moncalieri
- 1993–94 FCV Biellese
- 1994–95 Saluzzo
- 1995–96 Fossanese
- 1996–97 Cuneo
- 1997–98 Novese
- 1998–99 Moncalieri
- 1999–2000 Rivoli
- 2000–01 Trino
- 2001–02 Pinerolo
- 2002–03 Orbassano
- 2003–04 Novese
- 2004–05 Saluzzo
- 2005–06 Rivarolese
- 2006–07 Derthona
- 2007–08 Albese
- 2008–09 Acqui
- 2009–10 Asti
- 2010–11 Villalvernia Val Borbera
- 2011–12 Bra
- 2012–13 Albese
- 2013–14 Acqui
- 2014–15 Pinerolo
- 2015–16 Casale
- 2016–17 Castellazzo Bormida
- 2017–18 Pro Dronero
- 2018–19 Fossano
- 2019–20 Derthona
- 2020–21 Asti
- 2021–22 Pinerolo
- 2022–23 Alba
- 2023–24 Saluzzo
- 2024–25 Valenzana
