= SSD Acqui Football Club =

Italian football club

Acqui
- Full name: SSD Acqui Football Club
- Founded: 1911; Refounded in 2017
- Ground: Stadio Jona Ottolenghi, Acqui Terme, Italy
- Capacity: 1,500
- Chairman: Ferruccio Allara
- Manager: Arturo Merlo
- League: Eccellenza Piedmont and Aosta Valley/B
- 2019–20: Promozione/Piedmont, 1st
- Website: http://www.acquicalciofc.it
Home colours	Away colours

Acqui Football Club is an Italian association football club, based in Acqui Terme, Piedmont. Currently it plays in Eccellenza.

== History ==
Founded in 1911 on the initiative of three gymnastics clubs of the termale town (The Bagni, Arte et Marte and Acqui Club), the U.S. Acqui experienced its most successful period in the years following the founding: came to play in the Campionato Nazionale 1914–15, the last stop before the championship. It spent the next decades in Division I and Serie C, and after World War II, it took part in mostly lower tournaments.

The club returned to Serie D in the 2009–10 season after winning Eccellenza Piedmont and Aosta Valley Girone B. In the 2011–12 season, Acqui finished in 15th place in Serie D Girone A.

In summer 2012 it was excluded from Covisod for lack of documentation for playing in 2012–13 Serie D. On 23 August 2012, the club was admitted in surplus in Eccellenza Piedmont and Aosta Valley/B. Finally it went bankrupt in 2017 and its assets were bought by a minor town club which became the new Acqui FC.

== Colors and badge ==
The team's colors are white and black.
