= ASD Vallée d'Aoste Charvensod =

Italian football club

Vallée d’Aoste Charvensod
- Full name: Associazione Sportiva Dilettantistica; Vallée d’Aoste Charvensod
- Founded: 2004 (as Aosta Calcio Charvensod); 2010 (as Vallée d’Aoste Charvensod)
- Ground: Guido Saba Stadium, Charvensod, Italy
- Chairman: Manuel Ravelli
- Manager: Mirko Monetta
- League: Eccellenza Piedmont and Aosta Valley
- 2012–13: Promozione Piedmont and Aosta, 1st (promoted)
Home colours	Away colours

Associazione Sportiva Dilettantistica Vallée d’Aoste Charvensod is an Italian association football club, based in Charvensod, Aosta Valley.

The club currently plays in Promozione Piedmont and Aosta Valley.

== History ==
=== From Aosta Calcio Charvensod to Vallée d’Aoste Charvensod ===
U.S. Aosta Calcio Charvensod was founded in 2004 after the merger of A.S. Aosta 2000 and Charvensod Sant’Orso.

In 2007 it became A.S.D. Charvensod Aosta.

In the summer of 2010 the club, who had just been relegated to Prima Categoria, changes its name in A.S.D. Vallée d’Aoste Charvensod, in order to continue so the tradition of the former Valle d'Aosta Calcio which had been dissolved and ostensibly represented the Aosta Valley region, however, the club never formally acquired the sports title and assets.

The team was promoted from Prima Categoria Piedmont and Aosta to Promozione Piedmont and Aosta Valley in the 2010–11 season.
