= Joseph Nonge =

Belgian footballer (born 2005)

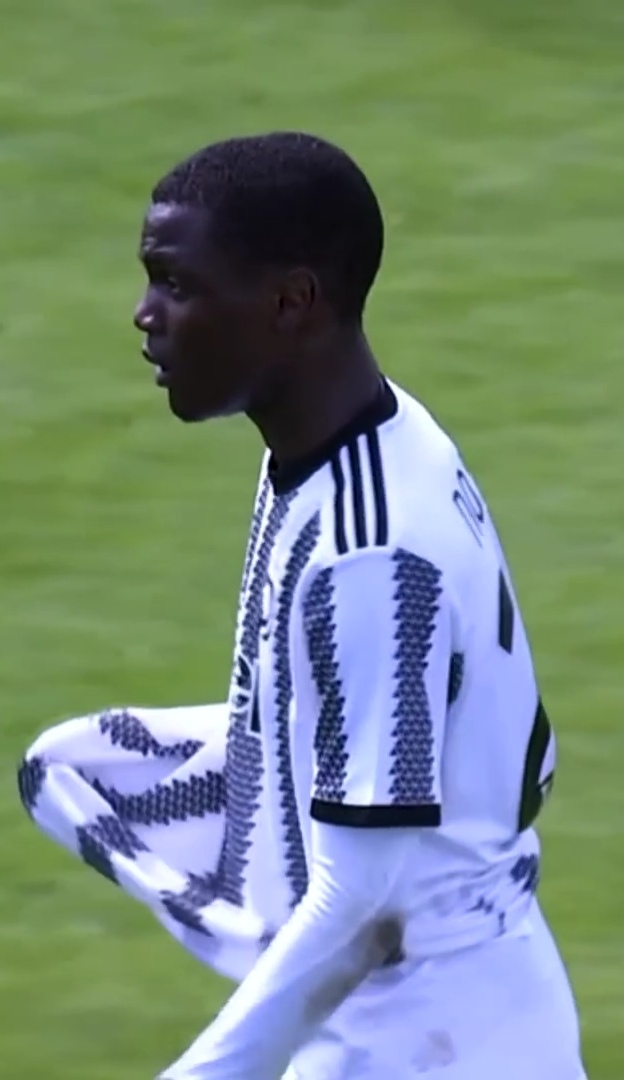
- Nonge during a UEFA Youth League game in 2022

Personal information
- Full name: Joseph Nonge Boende Ruiz
- Date of birth: 15 May 2005 (age 21)
- Place of birth: Jette, Belgium
- Height: 1.84 m (6 ft 0 in)
- Position: Midfielder

Team information
- Current team: Brest

Youth career
- –2021: Anderlecht
- 2021–2023: Juventus

Senior career*
Years	Team	Apps	(Gls)
2022–2025	Juventus Next Gen	16	(1)
2024–2025	Juventus	2	(0)
2024–2025	→ Troyes (loan)	6	(0)
2024–2025	→ Troyes II (loan)	5	(1)
2025	→ Servette (loan)	5	(0)
2025–2026	Kocaelispor	25	(0)
2026–	Brest	0	(0)

International career^{‡}
2020	Belgium U15	1	(0)
2021	Belgium U17	4	(0)
2022–2023	Belgium U18	6	(0)
2023	Belgium U19	1	(0)
2023	Belgium U20	2	(0)
2025–	Belgium U21	7	(0)
- * Club domestic league appearances and goals as of 10 June 2026 ‡ National team caps and goals as of 15:31, 18 November 2026 (UTC)

Joseph Nonge Boende Ruiz (born 15 May 2005) is a Belgian professional footballer who plays as a midfielder for Ligue 1 club Brest.

== Club career ==
Nonge started his career in the youth academy of RSC Anderlecht. In July 2021, he joined the youth category of Italian team Juventus.

On 19 March 2023, he made his debut with Juventus Next Gen in a Serie C game against Pro Patria in which he played 61 minutes in a 1–1 draw.

On 4 January 2024, Nonge made his debut with the first team, coming as a substitute in a 6–1 Coppa Italia win over Salernitana.

On 7 January 2024, he made his debut in Serie A, coming as a substitute in a last-minute win over Salernitana.

On 30 August 2024, Nonge was loaned to Troyes in France, with an option to buy. On 24 January 2025, he moved on a new loan to Servette in Switzerland, also with an option to buy.

On 5 August 2026, Nonge joined Ligue 1 side Brest on a three-year deal, with an option for an additional year.

== International career ==
Born in Belgium to a Costa Rican mother and Congolese father, Nonge is eligible to play for Belgium, DR Congo and Costa Rica in the international level. He has represented Belgium internationally at youth level since 2020.

== Career statistics ==
=== Club ===
As of match played 9 March 2025

Appearances and goals by club, season and competition
Club	Season	League			National cup (Note: Includes Coppa Italia, Coupe de France)		Other		Total	
Club	Season	Division	Apps	Goals	Apps	Goals	Apps	Goals	Apps	Goals
Juventus Next Gen	2022-23	Serie C	1	0	—		—		1	0
Juventus Next Gen	2023-24	Serie C	15	1	—		4 (Note: Appearance(s) in Promotion/Relegation play-offs)	0	19	1
Juventus Next Gen	Total		16	1	—		4	0	20	1
Juventus	2023-24	Serie A	2	0	2	0	—		4	0
Troyes (loan)	2024-25	Ligue 2	6	0	0	0	—		6	0
Troyes (res.)	2024–25	Championnat National 3	5	1	0	0	0	0	5	1
Servette	2024–25	Swiss Super League	5	0	0	0	0	0	5	0
Career total			34	1	2	0	4	0	40	1
