= Enea Benedetto =

Italian entrepreneur (born 1975)

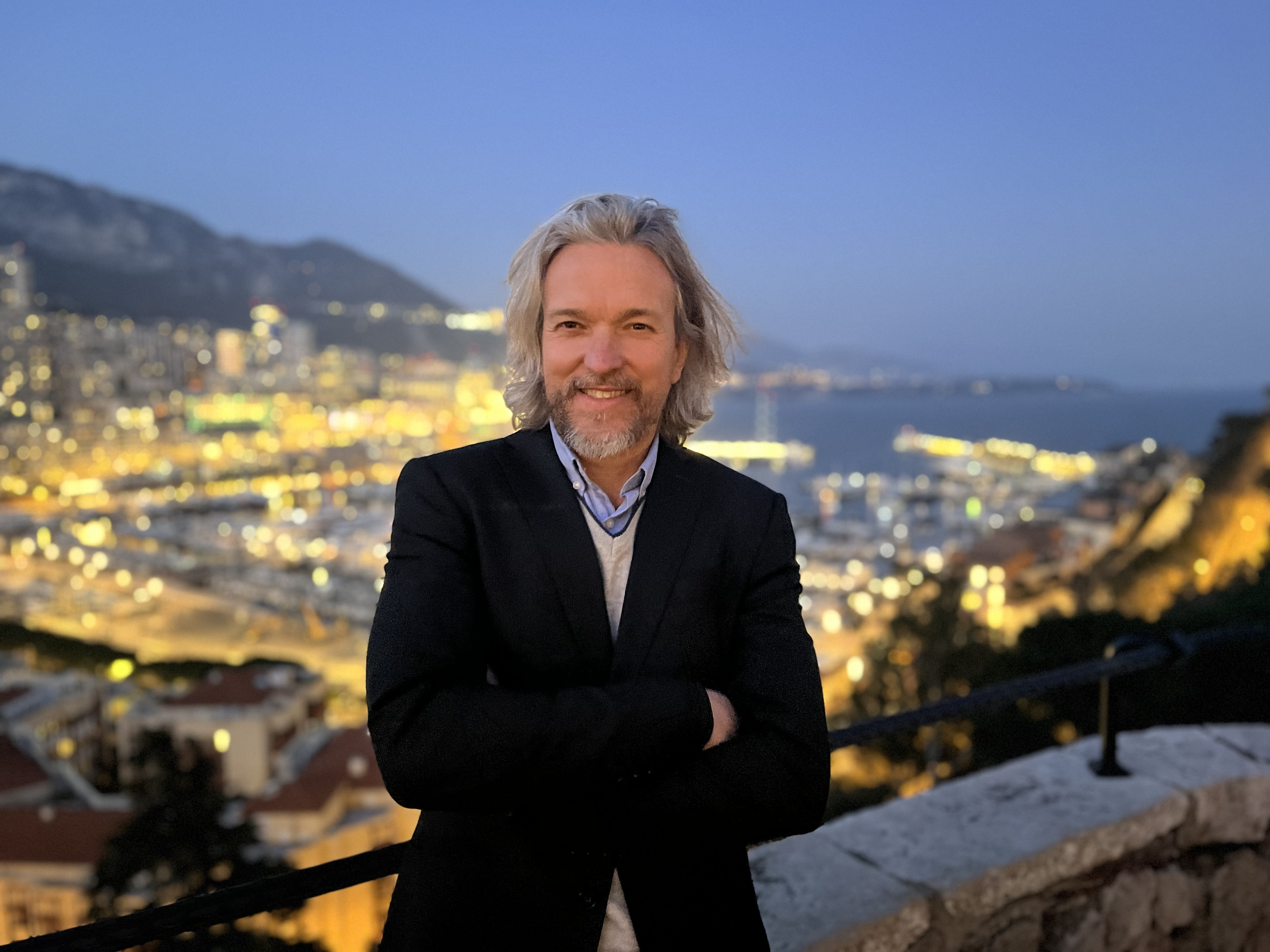
- Photo of Enea Benedetto in 2022
- Born: 28 June 1975 (age 50); Turin, Italy
- Occupation: entrepreneur
- Known for: Vectorium (owner); BenediXit (main shareholder)
- Board member of: Vectorium (CEO); Royal Protocol UÜ (CEO); Unione Sportiva Alessandria Calcio 1912 (chairman) AC Legnano (chairman)

Enea Benedetto (born 1975) is an Italian businessman and entrepreneur. He is CEO of Vectorium, former president (Italian: presidente) of football club Unione Sportiva Alessandria Calcio 1912, former president and owner of the Italian football club AC Legnano and currently serves as the President of the Saudi-European Innovation Hub (SEIH), a pioneering initiative aimed at fostering collaboration in innovation, fintech, and smart cities between Saudi Arabia and Europe. He is also the CEO and founder of benediXit OÜ, a consultancy firm focused on digital transformation, innovation, and strategic planning. Benedetto is the CEO of Royal Protocol UÜ since July 2025, an Estonian company that owns and operates the blockchain platform, know-how and protocols of the Royal Protocol, developed in partnership with Emanuele Filiberto of Savoy, Prince of Venice.

== Early and career ==
Enea Benedetto was born in Turin, Italy, in 1975. He attended the Université Paris Cité between 1993 and 1997 and graduated with a Doctor in Sociology. He also holds a master's degree in sociology from Universite Toulouse. In January 2016, Benedetto launched Vectorium, a company servicing the blockchain and AI development through the crypto carbon credits innovation. He is also the founder of benediXit which was launched in 2018.

In July 2020, Benedetto attempted to purchase the Serie A football club Torino FC. In July 2022, Benedetto re-established the old Torino Calcio, creating the AS Torino Calcio. He was subsequently appointed President of Unione Sportiva Alessandria Calcio 1912.
