= ACSD Saluzzo =

Association football club in Italy

Saluzzo
- Full name: Associazione Calcio Sportiva Dilettantistica Saluzzo
- Nicknames: Granata (maroons), Salusse, Marchionali (marquisals)
- Founded: 1901; 125 years ago
- Ground: Stadio Amedeo Damiano, Saluzzo, Italy
- Capacity: 1,570
- League: Serie D
Home colours	Away colours

Associazione Calcio Sportiva Dilettantistica Saluzzo (briefly ACSD Saluzzo or AC Saluzzo, commonly Saluzzo) is an Italian association football club located in Saluzzo, Piedmont. It currently plays in Serie D. Its colors are all-maroon.
