= Félix Nzouango =

French footballer (born 2003)

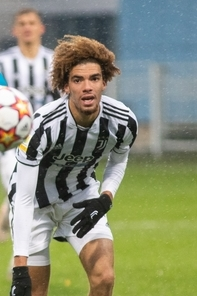
- Nzouango in 2021

Personal information
- Full name: Félix Victor Anlong Nzouango Bikien
- Date of birth: 7 January 2003 (age 23)
- Place of birth: Creil, France
- Height: 1.88 m (6 ft 2 in)
- Position: Defender

Team information
- Current team: FC Bourgoin-Jallieu

Youth career
- 2009–2018: AFC Creil
- 2018–2020: Amiens SC
- 2020–2022: Juventus

Senior career*
Years	Team	Apps	(Gls)
2022–2023	Juventus Next Gen	10	(0)
2023–2025	Beerschot	7	(0)
2025–2026	Egaleo	10	(0)
2026–	FC Bourgoin-Jallieu	0	(0)

International career
2018–2019	France U16	10	(0)
2019	France U17	4	(0)
2022	France U19	3	(1)
2023	France U20	1	(1)
- * Club domestic league appearances and goals as of 7 December 2025

Félix Nzouango Bikien (born 7 January 2003) is a French professional footballer who plays as a defender for Super League Greece 2 club Egaleo.

== Club career ==
In 2018, Nzouango joined Amiens's youth sector, having been noticed by the youth set-up coordinator who had seen him play in Creil. In September 2020, he was bought by Juventus for a fee of 3 million euros. He made his professional debut on 3 September 2022, in a 2–0 win against Trento, playing for Juventus Next Gen.

On 12 July 2023, Nzouango signed a two-year contract with Beerschot in Belgium.

== International career ==
Nzouango was called up to the France U20s for the 2023 FIFA U-20 World Cup.

== Personal life ==
Son of a Cameroonian father and of French mother, Nzouango has two sisters and two brothers, one of which is twin.

== Style of play ==
Nzouango is a defender who can play either as a centre-back or full-back.

== Honours ==
Beerschot

- First Division B/Challenger Pro League: 2023-24

== Career statistics ==
As of match played 26 March 2023

Appearances and goals by club, season and competition
Club	Season	League			Coppa Italia		Other		Total	
Club	Season	Division	Apps	Goals	Apps	Goals	Apps	Goals	Apps	Goals
Juventus Next Gen	2022–23	Serie C	10	0	—		1 (Note: Appearance in Coppa Italia Serie C)	0	11	0
Career total			10	0	0	0	1	0	11	0
