= ASDC Borgomanero =

Italian football club

Borgomanero
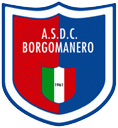
- Full name: Associazione Sportiva Dilettantistica Calcio Borgomanero
- Founded: 1951
- Ground: Stadio Comunale, Borgomanero, Italy
- Capacity: 1,000
- Chairman: Bruno Rosson
- Manager: Giampiero Erbetta
- League: Serie D/B
- 2012–13: Eccellenza Piedmont and Aosta Valley/A, 1st (promoted)
Home colours	Away colours

Associazione Sportiva Dilettantistica Calcio Borgomanero is an Italian association football club located in Borgomanero, Piedmont. It currently plays in Serie D.

== History ==
In 2012–13 season Borgomanero won promotion to Serie D after finishing first in Eccellenza Piedmont and Aosta Valley Girone A.

=== The foundation ===
It was founded in 1951 and spent several seasons in Serie D.

== Colors and badge ==
Its colors are blue and red.
