= SS Verbania Calcio =

Italian football club

Verbania
- Full name: Associazione Sportiva Dilettantistica Verbania Calcio 1959
- Nickname: Biancocerchiati (White-ringed)
- Founded: 1959; 67 years ago as, Società Sportiva Verbania Calcio (merged); 1972; 54 years ago as, Associazione Sportiva Verbania; 1973; 53 years ago as, Associazione Sportiva Verbania Calcio; 2003; 23 years ago as, Associazione Sportiva Dilettantistica Calcio Verbania; 2006; 20 years ago as, Associazione Sportiva Dilettantistica Amici del Verbania (refounded); 2008; 18 years ago as, Associazione Sportiva Dilettantistica Calcio Verbania; 2011; 15 years ago as, Società Sportiva Dilettantistica Verbania Calcio 1959; 2016; 10 years ago as, Associazione Sportiva Dilettantistica Calcio Verbania (takeover); 2017; 9 years ago as, Associazione Sportiva Dilettantistica Città di Verbania; 2026; 0 years ago as, Associazione Sportiva Dilettantistica Verbania Calcio 1959 (takeover)
- Ground: Stadio Carlo Pedroli, Verbania, Italy
- Capacity: 3,000
- Chairman: Daniele Barbone
- Manager: Davide Tabozzi
- League: Seconda Categoria
- 2019–20: Serie D/A, 17th (relegated)
| Home colours | Away colours |

Associazione Sportiva Dilettantistica Verbania Calcio 1959, shortened as Verbania, is an Italian association football club located in the town of Verbania, Piedmont. It currently plays in Seconda Categoria.

== History ==
The club was founded in 1959 after the merging of Libertas Pallanza and Verbania Sportiva that was founded in 1947 and played the season, 1947–48, in Serie C, the third level of Italian football.

The new club spent the majority of its history in the semi-professional and regional levels of Italian Football, in Serie D and Eccellenza; but in the early period of its history, it played 7 seasons in Serie C (currently Lega Pro Prima Divisione), from 1966–67 to 1972–73.

In 2006 the sports title was transferred from A.S.D. Verbania Calcio to A.S.D. Amici del Verbania, which the former was liquidated.

In the season 2011–12 it was promoted from Eccellenza Piedmont and Aosta Valley/A to Serie D.

== Colors, badge and stadium ==
The club's colour is white ringed by a blue-yellow-red strip and the club's home ground is the Stadio Carlo Pedroli.

== Notable players ==
One of the club's most notable players is Maltese striker, Carmel Busuttil, who played over 100 times for Malta, and scored 23 international goals.

== Honours ==
- Eccellenza Piedmont and Aosta Valley:
  - Winners 1: 2011–12
- Regional Coppa Italia Piedmont and Aosta Valley:
  - Winners 1: 2011–12
