= History of Valle d'Aosta Calcio =

Italian football club

Valle d'Aosta
- Full name: Valle d'Aosta Calcio
- Founded: 1911 (as Augusta Praetoria Sports); 1931 (as A.S. Aosta); 1945 (as U.S. Aosta 1911); 1997 (as Valle d’Aosta Châtillon Saint-Vincent Fenusma); 2000 (as Valle d’Aosta Calcio)
- Dissolved: 2010
- Ground: Mario Puchoz Stadium; Aosta, Italy
Home colours	Away colours

Valle d'Aosta Calcio was an Italian association football club, based in Aosta, Aosta Valley.

== History ==
=== The two previous bankruptcies ===
==== From the foundation to Aosta 1911 ====
The origins of the team go back to 1911 when Augusta Prætoria Sports was founded. The club, became A.S. Aosta in 1931 and U.S. Aosta 1911 in 1945, has played in Serie C from the season 1941–42 to 1942–43, from 1945–46 to 1947-48 and in the year 1951–52. U.S. Aosta 1911 went bankrupt in 1998 after having played the last season in Promozione Piedmont and Aosta Valley.

==== Valle d'Aosta Calcio ====
U.S. Valle d’Aosta Châtillon Saint-Vincent Fenusma was founded in 1997, acquiring the sports title of Serie D club U.S. Châtillon Saint-Vincent based in Saint-Vincent. The club became Valle d’Aosta Calcio in 2000, transferring its seat to Aosta.

Aosta Valley was the champion of 2007–08 Eccellenza Piedmont Group; Aosta Valley relegated from 2009–10 Serie D to Eccellenza two year after. The club became bankrupt in 2010, after the relegation.

== Football in Aosta Valley now ==
Since 2010, A.S.D. Vallée d’Aoste Charvensod have claimed to be the heir of the club, however the sports title and assets have never been acquired. In 2012 when Saint-Christophe was promoted to Lega Pro Seconda Divisione, the club changed their common name to just Vallée d’Aoste in order to represent the whole valley. The team, however, has no intentions to acquire the sports title and assets.

== Colors and badge ==
The team's colors are red and black.
