= 2023–24 SS Lazio season =

SS Lazio
2023–24 season
- Chairman: Claudio Lotito
- Head coach: Maurizio Sarri (until 12 March); Giovanni Martusciello (caretaker, from 13 to 18 March); Igor Tudor (from 18 March)
- Stadium: Stadio Olimpico
- Serie A: 7th
- Coppa Italia: Semi-finals
- Supercoppa Italiana: Semi-finals
- UEFA Champions League: Round of 16
- Top goalscorer: League: Ciro Immobile (7); All: Ciro Immobile (11)
- Average home league attendance: 44,853
Home colours	Away colours	Third colours

The 2023–24 season was the 124th season in the history of SS Lazio and their 36th consecutive season in the top flight. The club participated in Serie A, the Coppa Italia, the Supercoppa Italiana, and the UEFA Champions League.

== First-team squad ==
As of 17 January 2024

No.	Player	Nationality	Position	Date of birth (age)	Signed from	Signed in	Contract ends
Goalkeepers
33	Luigi Sepe	(Italy)	GK	8 May 1991 (aged 33)	Salernitana	2023	2024
35	Christos Mandas	(Greece)	GK	17 September 2001 (aged 22)	(Greece) OFI	2023	2028
53	Federico Magro	(Italy)	GK	10 January 2005 (aged 19)	Academy	2022	2025
94	Ivan Provedel	(Italy)	GK	17 March 1994 (aged 30)	Spezia	2022	2027
Defenders
3	Luca Pellegrini	(Italy)	LB	7 March 1999 (aged 25)	Juventus	2023	2025
4	Patric	(Spain)	CB	17 April 1993 (aged 31)	(Spain) Barcelona B	2015	2027
13	Alessio Romagnoli	(Italy)	CB	12 January 1995 (aged 29)	Milan	2022	2027
15	Nicolò Casale	(Italy)	CB	14 February 1998 (aged 26)	Hellas Verona	2022	2027
16	Dimitrije Kamenović	(Serbia)	LB	16 July 2000 (aged 23)	(Serbia) Čukarički	2021	2026
23	Elseid Hysaj	(Albania)	RB	2 February 1994 (aged 30)	Napoli	2021	2025
29	Manuel Lazzari	(Italy)	RB	29 November 1993 (aged 30)	SPAL	2019	2027
34	Mario Gila	(Spain)	CB	29 August 2000 (aged 23)	(Spain) Real Madrid	2022	2027
46	Fabio Ruggeri	(Italy)	CB	13 December 2004 (aged 19)	Academy	2023	2026
77	Adam Marušić	(Montenegro)	RB	17 October 1992 (aged 31)	(Belgium) Oostende	2017	2025
Midfielders
5	Matías Vecino	(Uruguay)	CM	24 August 1991 (aged 32)	Internazionale	2022	2025
6	Daichi Kamada	(Japan)	AM	5 August 1996 (aged 27)	(Germany) Eintracht Frankfurt	2023	2024
8	Mattéo Guendouzi	(France)	CM	14 April 1999 (aged 25)	(France) Marseille	2023	2024
10	Luis Alberto	(Spain)	CM	28 September 1992 (aged 31)	(England) Liverpool	2016	2025
32	Danilo Cataldi	(Italy)	DM	6 August 1994 (aged 29)	Academy	2013	2027
65	Nicolò Rovella	(Italy)	DM	4 December 2001 (aged 22)	Juventus	2023	2025
Forwards
7	Felipe Anderson	(Brazil)	RW	15 April 1993 (aged 31)	(England) West Ham United	2021	2024
9	Pedro	(Spain)	RW	28 July 1987 (aged 36)	Roma	2021	2024
17	Ciro Immobile (C)	(Italy)	ST	20 February 1990 (aged 34)	(Spain) Sevilla	2016	2026
18	Gustav Isaksen	(Denmark)	RW	19 April 2001 (aged 23)	(Denmark) Midtjylland	2023	2028
19	Valentín Castellanos	(Argentina)	ST	3 October 1998 (aged 25)	(United States) New York City FC	2023	2028
20	Mattia Zaccagni	(Italy)	LW	16 June 1995 (aged 29)	Hellas Verona	2022	2025
22	Diego González	(Paraguay)	LW	7 January 2003 (aged 21)	(Mexico) Celaya	2023	2025
70	Saná Fernandes	(Guinea-Bissau)	LW	10 March 2006 (aged 18)	Academy	2023	2025
87	Cristiano Lombardi	(Italy)	RW	19 August 1995 (aged 28)	Academy	2014	2024

== Transfers ==
=== In ===
Date	Pos.	Player	Age	Moving from	Fee	Notes	Source
1 July 2023	FW	(Italy) Matteo Cancellieri	21	Hellas Verona	€7,960,000	Loan made permanent	
1 July 2023	FW	(Paraguay) Diego González	20	(Mexico) Celaya	€1,000,000		
17 July 2023	FW	(Argentina) Valentín Castellanos	24	(United States) New York City FC	€15,000,000	Plus €5,000,000 in add-ons	
3 August 2023	MF	(Japan) Daichi Kamada	26	Unattached	Free	End of contract with (Germany) Eintracht Frankfurt	
6 August 2023	FW	(Denmark) Gustav Isaksen	22	(Denmark) Midtjylland	€12,000,000	Plus add-ons	
31 August 2023	GK	(Greece) Christos Mandas	21	(Greece) OFI	€1,000,000		

=== Loans in ===
Date	Pos.	Player	Age	Loaned from	Notes	Source
17 August 2023	MF	(Italy) Nicolò Rovella	21	Juventus	Until the end of the 2024–25 season with €27,000,000 obligation to buy	
17 August 2023	DF	(Italy) Luca Pellegrini	24	Juventus	Until the end of the 2024–25 season with €27,000,000 obligation to buy	
24 August 2023	GK	(Italy) Luigi Sepe	32	Salernitana	Until the end of the season	
31 August 2023	MF	(France) Mattéo Guendouzi	24	(France) Marseille	€12,000,000 obligation to buy	

=== Out ===
Date	Pos.	Player	Age	Moving to	Fee	Notes	Source
30 June 2023	DF	(Romania) Ștefan Radu	36	Retired	End of contract		
30 June 2023	FW	(Argentina) Luka Romero	18	Milan	End of contract		
30 June 2023	DF	(Denmark) Riza Durmisi	29	Unattached	End of contract		
1 July 2023	DF	(Italy) Francesco Acerbi	35	Internazionale	€3,500,000	Loan made permanent	
3 July 2023	MF	(Argentina) Gonzalo Escalante	30	(Spain) Cádiz	€2,500,000	Loan made permanent	
12 July 2023	MF	(Serbia) Sergej Milinković-Savić	28	(Saudi Arabia) Al-Hilal	€40,000,000		
23 August 2023	DF	(Italy) Nicolò Armini	22	Potenza	Undisclosed		
31 August 2023	FW	(Spain) Jony	32	(Spain) Cartagena	Undisclosed		
4 January 2024	FW	(Italy) Emanuele Cicerelli	29	Catania	Undisclosed		
1 February 2024	FW	(Italy) Alessandro Rossi	27	Monterosi	Undisclosed		

=== Loans out ===
Date	Pos.	Player	Age	Loaned to	Notes	Source
1 July 2023	DF	(Italy) Mattia Novella	22	Picerno	Until the end of the season	
1 July 2023	MF	(Spain) Raúl Moro	20	(Spain) Valladolid	Option to buy	
4 August 2023	DF	(Italy) Romano Floriani Mussolini	20	Pescara	Until the end of the season	
4 August 2023	MF	(Italy) Andrea Marino	22	Foggia	Until the end of the season	
12 August 2023	FW	(Italy) Valerio Crespi	19	Cosenza	Until the end of the season	
14 August 2023	GK	(Portugal) Luís Maximiano	24	(Spain) Almería	€8,500,000 obligation to buy	
16 August 2023	FW	(Italy) Matteo Cancellieri	21	Empoli	€12,000,000 option to buy	
26 August 2023	MF	(Italy) Marco Bertini	21	SPAL	Until the end of the season	
26 August 2023	MF	(Ivory Coast) Jean-Daniel Akpa Akpro	30	Monza	Option to buy	
30 August 2023	GK	(Lithuania) Marius Adamonis	26	Perugia	Until the end of the season	
1 September 2023	MF	(Brazil) Marcos Antônio	23	(Greece) PAOK	Option to buy	
2 September 2023	GK	(Italy) Alessio Furlanetto	21	Fermana	Until the end of the season	
6 September 2023	MF	(Algeria) Mohamed Farès	27	Brescia	Until the end of the season	
17 January 2024	MF	(Croatia) Toma Bašić	27	Salernitana	Until the end of the season	
15 February 2024	DF	(Serbia) Dimitrije Kamenović	23	(Switzerland) Yverdon-Sport	Until the end of the season	

== Pre-season and friendlies ==
Win Draw Loss Fixtures

16 July 2023 Friendly	Lazio (Italy)	16–0	(Italy) Auronzo	Auronzo di Cadore, Italy
18:00 CEST (UTC+2)	Hysaj 2'; Immobile 17', 19', 42'; Pedro 20', 44'; Zaccagni 30'; Farès 46'; Casale 51'; Akpa Akpro 55', 63'; González 58'; Fernandes 60'; Crespi 79'; Bašić 81', 85'	Report		Stadium: Rodolfo Zandegiacomo; Referee: Dylan Marin

20 July 2023 Friendly	Lazio (Italy)	5–0	(Slovenia) Primorje	Auronzo di Cadore, Italy
18:00 CEST (UTC+2)	Pedro 11'; Immobile 18'; Felipe Anderson 22'; Zaccagni 48'; González 83'	Report		Stadium: Rodolfo Zandegiacomo; Referee: Alessandro Prontera (Italy)

23 July 2023 Friendly	Lazio (Italy)	4–0	(Italy) Triestina	Auronzo di Cadore, Italy
18:00 CEST (UTC+2)	Luis Alberto 6'; Immobile 42'; Zaccagni 57'; Cancellieri 78'	Report		Stadium: Rodolfo Zandegiacomo; Referee: Davide Albano

27 July 2023 Friendly	Lazio (Italy)	2–0	(Slovenia) Bravo	Auronzo di Cadore, Italy
18:00 CEST (UTC+2)	Immobile 26', 59'	Report	Gurlica (yellow card) 26'	Stadium: Stadio Rodolfo Zandegiacomo; Referee: Marco Menozzi (Italy)

3 August 2023 Friendly	Aston Villa (England)	3–0	(Italy) Lazio	Walsall, England
19:30 BST (UTC+1)	Watkins (penalty missed) 14', 37'; McGinn 55'; Mings (yellow card) 76'; Gila 85' (o.g.)	Report	Marušić (yellow card) 38'; Castellanos (yellow card) 76'; Patric (yellow card) 88'	Stadium: Bescot Stadium; Attendance: 10,388; Referee: Peter Bankes (England)

6 August 2023 Trofeo Costa Brava	Girona (Spain)	2–1	(Italy) Lazio	Girona, Spain
20:00 CEST (UTC+2)	Herrera (yellow card) 45+1'; Tsyhankov 50'; Stuani 70', (yellow card) 77'; Gazzaniga (yellow card) 77'	Report	Zaccagni (yellow card) 28'; Castellanos 76'; Luis Alberto (yellow card) 59'; Cancellieri (yellow card) 77'; Marušić (yellow card) 77'	Stadium: Montilivi; Referee: Víctor García Verdura (Spain)

13 August 2023 Friendly	Latina (Italy)	0–9	(Italy) Lazio	Latina, Italy
21:00 CEST (UTC+2)		Report	Immobile 13', 28', 52'; Felipe Anderson 19'; De Santis 39' (o.g.); Zaccagni 47'; Kamada 48'; Isaksen 55'; Castellanos 87'	Stadium: Stadio Domenico Francioni; Referee: Mario Perri

== Competitions ==
=== Overall record ===
Competition	First match	Last match	Starting round	Final position	Record							
Competition	First match	Last match	Starting round	Final position	Pld	W	D	L	GF	GA	GD	Win %
Serie A	20 August 2023	26 May 2024	Matchday 1	7th	38	18	7	13	49	39	+10	47.37
Coppa Italia	5 December 2023	23 April 2024	Round of 16	Semi-finals	4	3	0	1	4	3	+1	75.00
Supercoppa Italiana	19 January 2024		Semi-finals	Semi-finals	1	0	0	1	0	3	−3	0.00
UEFA Champions League	19 September 2023	5 March 2024	Group stage	Round of 16	8	4	1	3	8	10	−2	50.00
Total					51	25	8	18	61	55	+6	49.02

Source: Soccerway

=== Serie A ===
==== League table ====
Pos	Team	Pld	W	D	L	GF	GA	GD	Pts	Qualification or relegation
5	Bologna	38	18	14	6	54	32	+22	68	Qualification for the Champions League league phase (Note: Serie A gained an additional Champions League place as a result of Italy finishing as one of the two associations with the highest coefficient points in 2023–24.)
6	Roma	38	18	9	11	65	46	+19	63	Qualification for the Europa League league phase (Note: Since the winners of the 2023–24 Coppa Italia, Juventus, qualified for the Champions League, the Europa League berth awarded to the Coppa Italia winners was passed to the seventh-placed team, and the Conference League berth was passed to the eighth-placed team.)
7	Lazio	38	18	7	13	49	39	+10	61	Qualification for the Europa League league phase
8	Fiorentina	38	17	9	12	61	46	+15	60	Qualification for the Conference League play-off round
9	Torino	38	13	14	11	36	36	0	53 (Note: Torino finished ahead of Napoli on head-to-head points: Torino 3–0 Napoli, Napoli 1–1 Torino.)	

Source: Serie A
Rules for classification: 1) Points; 2) Tiebreaker for Champions team and third relegated team; 3) Head-to-head points; 4) Head-to-head goal difference; 5) Goal difference; 6) Goals scored; 7) Draw.
(Note: Head-to-head record is used only after all the matches between the teams in question have been played)

==== Results summary ====
Overall								Home						Away					
Pld	W	D	L	GF	GA	GD	Pts	W	D	L	GF	GA	GD	W	D	L	GF	GA	GD
38	18	7	13	49	39	+10	61	10	4	5	23	14	+9	8	3	8	26	25	+1

Source: Serie A

==== Results by round ====
Round	1	2	3	4	5	6	7	8	9	10	11	12	13	14	15	16	17	18	19	20	22	23	24	25	21^{1}	26	27	28	29	30	31	32	33	34	35	36	37	38
Ground	A	H	A	A	H	H	A	H	A	H	A	H	A	H	A	H	A	H	A	H	H	A	A	H	A	A	H	H	A	H	A	H	A	H	A	H	A	H
Result	L	L	W	L	D	W	L	W	W	W	L	D	L	W	D	L	W	W	W	W	D	L	W	L	W	L	L	L	W	W	L	W	W	W	D	W	D	D
Position	13	18	12	15	15	12	16	13	9	7	10	10	11	9	10	11	9	9	7	6	6	7	9	8	7	8	9	9	9	7	8	7	7	7	7	7	7	7
Points	0	0	3	3	4	7	7	10	13	16	16	17	17	20	21	21	24	27	30	33	34	34	37	37	40	40	40	40	43	46	46	49	52	55	56	59	60	61

Source: Serie A
A = Away; H = Home; W = Win; D = Draw; L = Loss

^{1} Matchday 21 (vs Torino) was postponed to 22 February 2024 due to Lazio's participation in the 2023 Supercoppa Italiana.

==== Matches ====
The league fixtures were announced on 5 July 2023.

20 August 2023 1	Lecce	2–1	Lazio	Lecce
20:45 CEST (UTC+2)	Strefezza (yellow card) 68'; González (yellow card) 80'; Pongračić (yellow card) 80'; Almqvist 85'; Di Francesco 87'	Report	Immobile 26'; Isaksen (yellow card) 71'; Pellegrini (yellow card) 90+4'	Stadium: Stadio Via del mare Attendance: 29,081; Referee: Federico Dionisi

27 August 2023 2	Lazio	0–1	Genoa	Rome
20:45 CEST (UTC+2)	Cataldi (yellow card) 38'; Pellegrini (yellow card) 90+2'; Zaccagni (yellow card) 90+3'; Immobile (yellow card) 90+4'	Report	Retegui 16'; Frendrup (yellow card) 39'; Malinovskyi (yellow card) 61'	Stadium: Stadio Olimpico; Attendance: 40,000; Referee: Livio Marinelli

2 September 2023 3	Napoli	1–2	Lazio	Naples
20:45 CEST (UTC+2)	Zieliński 32'	Report	Zaccagni (yellow card) 26'; Luis Alberto 30', (yellow card) 60'; Kamada 52'	Stadium: Stadio Diego Armando Maradona; Attendance: 42,765; Referee: Andrea Colombo

16 September 2023 4	Juventus	3–1	Lazio	Turin
18:00 CEST (UTC+2)	Miretti (yellow card) 8'; Vlahović 10', 67', (yellow card) 82'; Bremer (yellow card) 16'; Chiesa 26'; Gatti (yellow card) 61'; Cambiaso (yellow card) 77'	Report	Luis Alberto 64'; Pellegrini (yellow card) 85'	Stadium: Juventus Stadium; Attendance: 40,562; Referee: Fabio Maresca

23 September 2023 5	Lazio	1–1	Monza	Rome
20:45 CEST (UTC+2)	Immobile 12' (pen.); Rovella (yellow card) 88'; Luis Alberto (yellow card) 90+6'	Report	Gagliardini 36'; Izzo (yellow card) 36'; Mota (yellow card) 40'	Stadium: Stadio Olimpico; Attendance: 37,500; Referee: Rosario Abisso

27 September 2023 6	Lazio	2–0	Torino	Rome
20:45 CEST (UTC+2)	Vecino 56'; Immobile (yellow card) 65'; Zaccagni 75'	Report	Bellanova (yellow card) 33'; Tameze (yellow card) 45+1'; Schuurs (yellow card) 74'; Ricci (yellow card) 82'	Stadium: Stadio Olimpico; Attendance: 35,700; Referee: Michael Fabbri

30 September 2023 7	Milan	2–0	Lazio	Milan
18:00 CEST (UTC+2)	Pulisic 60'; Leão (yellow card) 65'; Hernandez (yellow card) 84'; Maignan (yellow card) 86'; Okafor 88'	Report	Marušić (yellow card) 51'; Romagnoli (yellow card) 64'	Stadium: San Siro; Attendance: 72,035; Referee: Davide Massa

8 October 2023 8	Lazio	3–2	Atalanta	Rome
15:00 CEST (UTC+2)	De Ketelaere 5' (o.g.); Castellanos 11'; Vecino 83', (yellow card) 84'	Report	Éderson 33'; Kolašinac 63'; Ruggeri (yellow card) 79'	Stadium: Stadio Olimpico; Attendance: 41,500; Referee: Daniele Orsato

21 October 2023 9	Sassuolo	0–2	Lazio	Reggio Emilia
20:45 CEST (UTC+2)	Pedersen (yellow card) 31'	Report	Felipe Anderson 28'; Rovella (yellow card) 32'; Pedro (yellow card) 44'; Luis Alberto 35', (yellow card) 75'; Immobile (yellow card) 63'; Cataldi (yellow card) 77'	Stadium: Mapei Stadium – Città del Tricolore; Attendance: 15,597; Referee: Marco Di Bello

30 October 2023 10	Lazio	1–0	Fiorentina	Rome
20:45 CET (UTC+1)	Lazzari (yellow card) 31'; Rovella (yellow card) 45+2'; Zaccagni (yellow card) 67'; Immobile 90+5' (pen.)	Report	Duncan (yellow card) 40'; Ikoné (yellow card) 45+2'; Bonaventura (yellow card) 55'	Stadium: Stadio Olimpico; Attendance: 35,000; Referee: Matteo Marcenaro

3 November 2023 11	Bologna	1–0	Lazio	Bologna
20:45 CET (UTC+1)	Ferguson 46', (yellow card) 50'; Beukema (yellow card) 56'	Report	Pedro (yellow card) 35'; Romagnoli (yellow card) 50'; Luis Alberto (yellow card) 65'; Zaccagni (yellow card) 80'; Isaksen (yellow card) 90+6'	Stadium: Stadio Renato Dall'Ara; Attendance: 24,178; Referee: Federico La Penna

12 November 2023 12	Lazio	0–0	Roma	Rome
18:00 CET (UTC+1)	Immobile (yellow card) 39'; Luis Alberto (yellow card) 67'; Patric (yellow card) 74'	Report	Mancini (yellow card) 18'; Ndicka (yellow card) 31'; Lukaku (yellow card) 37'; Azmoun (yellow card) 87'	Stadium: Stadio Olimpico; Attendance: 63,000; Referee: Davide Massa

25 November 2023 13	Salernitana	2–1	Lazio	Salerno
15:00 CET (UTC+1)	Gyömbér (yellow card) 42'; Daniliuc (yellow card) 53'; Kastanos 55'; Candreva 66'; Maggiore (yellow card) 84'; Fazio (yellow card) 88'; Coulibaly (yellow card) 90+4'	Report	Lazzari (yellow card) 32'; Immobile 43' (pen.); Cataldi (yellow card) 79'; Vecino (yellow card) 90+4'	Stadium: Stadio Arechi; Attendance: 16,700; Referee: Alessandro Prontera

2 December 2023 14	Lazio	1–0	Cagliari	Rome
18:00 CET (UTC+1)	Pedro 8'	Report	Chatzidiakos (yellow card) 12'; Makoumbou (red card) 27'; Nández (yellow card) 75'	Stadium: Stadio Olimpico; Attendance: 40,000; Referee: Federico Dionisi

9 December 2023 15	Hellas Verona	1–1	Lazio	Verona
15:00 CET (UTC+1)	Duda (yellow card) 15' (yellow-red card) 77'; Henry 70'	Report	Zaccagni 23'; Marušić (yellow card) 24'; Hysaj (yellow card) 63'; Felipe Anderson (yellow card) 82'; Pedro (yellow card) 90+5'	Stadium: Stadio Marcantonio Bentegodi; Attendance: 28,401; Referee: Giovanni Ayroldi

17 December 2023 16	Lazio	0–2	Internazionale	Rome
20:45 CET (UTC+1)	Casale (yellow card) 81'; Lazzari (red card) 87'	Report	Thuram (yellow card) 26', (goal) 66'; Martínez 40'; Barella (yellow card) 61'	Stadium: Stadio Olimpico; Attendance: 59,000; Referee: Fabio Maresca

22 December 2023 17	Empoli	0–2	Lazio	Empoli
18:30 CET (UTC+1)	Maldini (yellow card) 15'; Fazzini (yellow card) 45+1'; Bastoni (yellow card) 57'	Report	Guendouzi 9'; Patric (yellow card) 26'; Rovella (yellow card) 46'; Zaccagni 67'	Stadium: Stadio Carlo Castellani; Attendance: 8,800; Referee: Matteo Marchetti

29 December 2023 18	Lazio	3–1	Frosinone	Rome
20:45 CET (UTC+1)	Patric (yellow card) 56', (goal) 84'; Castellanos 70'; Isaksen 72'; Cataldi (yellow card) 90+6'	Report	Soulé 57' (pen.); Okoli (yellow card) 75'; Barrenechea (yellow card) 78'	Stadium: Stadio Olimpico; Attendance: 40,000; Referee: Ermanno Feliciani

7 January 2024 19	Udinese	1–2	Lazio	Udine
15:00 CET (UTC+1)	Kristensen (yellow card) 10'; Payero (yellow card) 35'; Masina (yellow card) 38'; Ferreira (yellow card) 44'; Walace 59'; Pérez (yellow card) 90+1'	Report	Pellegrini 12', (yellow card) 58'; Kamada (yellow card) 40'; Gila (yellow card) 46'; Vecino 76'	Stadium: Stadio Friuli; Attendance: 23,033; Referee: Juan Luca Sacchi

14 January 2024 20	Lazio	1–0	Lecce	Rome
12:30 CET (UTC+1)	Zaccagni (yellow card) 45'; Felipe Anderson 58'; Guendouzi (yellow card) 77'; Vecino (yellow card) 89'; Immobile (yellow card) 90+3'	Report	Gendrey (yellow card) 45+1'; Venuti (yellow card) 75'; Ramadani (yellow card) 81'; Pongračić (yellow card) 90+4'	Stadium: Stadio Olimpico; Attendance: 40,000; Referee: Maria Sole Ferrieri Caputi

28 January 2024 22	Lazio	0–0	Napoli	Rome
18:00 CET (UTC+1)	Romagnoli (yellow card) 55'; Gila (yellow card) 69'; Cataldi (yellow card) 82'	Report	Demme (yellow card) 49'; Østigård (yellow card) 90+5'	Stadium: Stadio Olimpico; Attendance: 30,000; Referee: Daniele Orsato

4 February 2024 23	Atalanta	3–1	Lazio	Bergamo
18:00 CET (UTC+1)	Pašalić (yellow card) 9', (goal) 16'; De Ketelaere 43' (pen.), 76'; Éderson (yellow card) 78'	Report	Felipe Anderson (yellow card) 45'; Luis Alberto (yellow card) 45+1'; Rovella (yellow card) 47'; Immobile 84' (pen.)	Stadium: Gewiss Stadium; Attendance: 14,492; Referee: Marco Guida

10 February 2024 24	Cagliari	1–3	Lazio	Cagliari
15:00 CET (UTC+1)	Gaetano 51'; Makoumbou (yellow card) 52'	Report	Deiola 26' (o.g.); Immobile (yellow card) 45+2', (goal) 49'; Felipe Anderson 65'; Romagnoli (yellow card) 68'; Vecino (yellow card) 90+3'	Stadium: Unipol Domus; Attendance: 16,155; Referee: Marco Di Bello

18 February 2024 25	Lazio	1–2	Bologna	Rome
12:30 CET (UTC+1)	Isaksen 18'; Cataldi (yellow card) 35'; Marušić (yellow card) 79'	Report	Fabbian (yellow card) 25'; El Azzouzi 39', (yellow card) 46'; Zirkzee 78'; Aebischer (yellow card) 90+3'	Stadium: Stadio Olimpico; Attendance: 40,000; Referee: Fabio Maresca

22 February 2024 21	Torino	0–2	Lazio	Turin
20:45 CET (UTC+1)	Ilić (yellow card) 15'; Linetty (yellow card) 27'; Lovato (yellow card) 72'	Report	Guendouzi 50'; Cataldi 56'; Gila (yellow card) 65' (yellow-red card) 79'	Stadium: Stadio Olimpico Grande Torino; Attendance: 22,742; Referee: Federico La Penna
Note: The match was rescheduled due to Lazio's participation in the 2023 Supercoppa Italiana.

26 February 2024 26	Fiorentina	2–1	Lazio	Florence
20:45 CET (UTC+1)	Kayode 61'; González (penalty missed) 68'; Bonaventura 69'	Report	Luis Alberto 45'; Guendouzi (yellow card) 67'; Vecino (yellow card) 89'	Stadium: Stadio Artemio Franchi; Attendance: 25,190; Referee: Marco Guida

1 March 2024 27	Lazio	0–1	Milan	Rome
20:45 CET (UTC+1)	Pellegrini (yellow card) 50' (yellow-red card) 57'; Romagnoli (yellow card) 58'; Immobile (yellow card) 77'; Hysaj (yellow card) 90'; Marušić (red card) 90+5'; Guendouzi (red card) 90+6'	Report	Florenzi (yellow card) 61'; Adli (yellow card) 70'; Gabbia (yellow card) 80'; Hernandez (yellow card) 84'; Okafor 88'; Leão (yellow card) 90+5'; Pulisic (yellow card) 90+6'	Stadium: Stadio Olimpico; Attendance: 50,500; Referee: Marco Di Bello

11 March 2024 28	Lazio	1–2	Udinese	Rome
20:45 CET (UTC+1)	Felipe Anderson (yellow card) 45+1'; Gianetti 49' (o.g.); Romagnoli (yellow card) 57'; Vecino (yellow card) 90+9'	Report	Pérez (yellow card) 44' (yellow-red card) 90+4'; Lucca 47', (yellow card) 86'; Zarraga 51'; Okoye (yellow card) 64'; Bijol (yellow card) 83'; Samardžić (yellow card) 88'	Stadium: Stadio Olimpico; Attendance: 34,000; Referee: Gianluca Aureliano

16 March 2024 29	Frosinone	2–3	Lazio	Frosinone
20:45 CET (UTC+1)	Lirola 13'; Barrenechea (yellow card) 55'; Cheddira 70'	Report	Pellegrini (yellow card) 34'; Zaccagni 38'; Castellanos 57', 62', (yellow card) 90+1'; Lazzari (yellow card) 88'	Stadium: Stadio Benito Stirpe; Attendance: 15,780; Referee: Antonio Rapuano

30 March 2024 30	Lazio	1–0	Juventus	Rome
18:00 CET (UTC+1)	Immobile (yellow card) 90+1'; Marušić 90+3'	Report	Iling-Junior (yellow card) 71'; Weah (yellow card) 75'	Stadium: Stadio Olimpico; Attendance: 57,000; Referee: Andrea Colombo

6 April 2024 31	Roma	1–0	Lazio	Rome
18:00 CEST (UTC+2)	Mancini 42', (yellow card) 55'; Çelik (yellow card) 68'; Paredes (yellow card) 81'; Pellegrini (yellow card) 90+3'; Lukaku (yellow card) 90+6'	Report	Vecino (yellow card) 21'; Pedro (yellow card) 73'; Castellanos (yellow card) 75'	Stadium: Stadio Olimpico; Attendance: 64,513; Referee: Marco Guida

12 April 2024 32	Lazio	4–1	Salernitana	Rome
20:45 CEST (UTC+2)	Felipe Anderson 7', 35'; Vecino 14'; Isaksen 87'	Report	Tchaouna 16'; Coulibaly (yellow card) 36'	Stadium: Stadio Olimpico; Attendance: 36,000; Referee: Luca Zufferli

19 April 2024 33	Genoa	0–1	Lazio	Genoa
18:30 CEST (UTC+2)	Vogliacco (yellow card) 87'	Report	Casale (yellow card) 16'; Luis Alberto 67'; Cataldi (yellow card) 87'	Stadium: Stadio Luigi Ferraris; Attendance: 30,697; Referee: Ermano Feliciani

27 April 2024 34	Lazio	1–0	Hellas Verona	Rome
20:45 CEST (UTC+2)	Romagnoli (yellow card) 38'; Casale (yellow card) 50'; Luis Alberto (yellow card) 71'; Zaccagni 72', (yellow card) 90+4'	Report	Duda (yellow card) 71'; Cabal (yellow card) 74'; Coppola (yellow card) 86'; Noslin (yellow card) 90+2'	Stadium: Stadio Olimpico; Attendance: 39,000; Referee: Davide Massa

4 May 2024 35	Monza	2–2	Lazio	Monza
18:00 CEST (UTC+2)	Đurić 73', 90+2'; Donati (yellow card) 90+6'	Report	Immobile 11'; Zaccagni (yellow card) 15'; Casale (yellow card) 35'; Kamada (yellow card) 45'; Romagnoli (yellow card) 56'; Patric (yellow card) 68'; Vecino 83', (yellow card) 90+5'; Cataldi (yellow card) 90+6'	Stadium: Stadio Brianteo; Attendance: 10,454; Referee: Luca Pairetto

12 May 2024 36	Lazio	2–0	Empoli	Rome
12:30 CEST (UTC+2)	Patric 45+3'; Lazzari (yellow card) 77'; Rovella (yellow card) 85'; Vecino 89'; Romagnoli (yellow card) 90+5'	Report	Gyasi (yellow card) 73'	Stadium: Stadio Olimpico; Attendance: 54,000; Referee: Gianluca Aureliano

19 May 2024 37	Internazionale	1–1	Lazio	Milan
18:00 CEST (UTC+2)	Dumfries 87'	Report	Kamada 32'; Casale (yellow card) 52'	Stadium: San Siro; Attendance: 73,148; Referee: Juan Luca Sacchi

26 May 2024 38	Lazio	1–1	Sassuolo	Rome
20:45 CEST (UTC+2)	Zaccagni 60', (yellow card) 88'; Kamada (yellow card) 65'; Guendouzi (yellow card) 82'	Report	Volpato (yellow card) 19'; Viti 66'	Stadium: Stadio Olimpico; Attendance: 56,000; Referee: Paride Tremolada

=== Coppa Italia ===
5 December 2023 Round of 16	Lazio	1–0	Genoa	Rome
21:00 CET (UTC+1)	Guendouzi 5'; Pellegrini (yellow card) 90+4'	Report	Galdames (yellow card) 49'; Fini (yellow card) 86'	Stadium: Stadio Olimpico; Attendance: 38,012; Referee: Juan Luca Sacchi

10 January 2024 Quarter-finals	Lazio	1–0	Roma	Rome
18:00 CET (UTC+1)	Zaccagni 51' (pen.); Castellanos (yellow card) 60'; Guendouzi (yellow card) 66'; Pellegrini (yellow card) 90+4'; Pedro (yellow card) 90+5' (yellow-red card) 90+6'	Report	Cristante (yellow card) 59'; Mancini (yellow card) 66', (red card) 90+11'; Azmoun (red card) 90+10'	Stadium: Stadio Olimpico; Attendance: 51,880; Referee: Daniele Orsato

2 April 2024 Semi-finals; First leg	Juventus	2–0	Lazio	Turin
21:00 CEST (UTC+2)	Gatti (yellow card) 37'; Chiesa 50'; Vlahović 64'; Weah (yellow card) 85'	Report		Stadium: Juventus Stadium; Attendance: 39,056; Referee: Davide Massa

23 April 2024 Semi-finals; Second leg	Lazio	2–1 (2–3 agg.)	Juventus	Rome
21:00 CEST (UTC+2)	Castellanos 12', 48'	Report	Locatelli (yellow card) 34'; Milik 83'	Stadium: Stadio Olimpico; Attendance: 40,076; Referee: Daniele Orsato

=== Supercoppa Italiana ===
19 January 2024 Semi-finals	Internazionale	3–0	Lazio	Riyadh, Saudi Arabia
22:00 SAST (UTC+3)	Thuram 17'; Çalhanoğlu 50' (pen.), (yellow card) 79'; Frattesi 87'	Report	Romagnoli (yellow card) 64'; Vecino (yellow card) 70'	Stadium: KSU Stadium; Attendance: 20,767; Referee: Matteo Marchetti

=== UEFA Champions League ===
==== Group stage ====
The draw for the group stage was held on 31 August 2023.

Pos	Team	Pld	W	D	L	GF	GA	GD	Pts	Qualification	ATM	LAZ	FEY	CEL
1	(Spain) Atlético Madrid	6	4	2	0	17	6	+11	14	Advance to knockout phase	—	2–0	3–2	6–0
2	(Italy) Lazio	6	3	1	2	7	7	0	10	Advance to knockout phase	1–1	—	1–0	2–0
3	(Netherlands) Feyenoord	6	2	0	4	9	10	−1	6	Transfer to Europa League	1–3	3–1	—	2–0
4	(Scotland) Celtic	6	1	1	4	5	15	−10	4		2–2	1–2	2–1	—

Source: UEFA
Rules for classification: Group stage tiebreakers

19 September 2023 1	Lazio (Italy)	1–1	(Spain) Atlético Madrid	Rome, Italy
21:00 CEST (UTC+2)	Patric (yellow card) 83'; Immobile (yellow card) 84'; Provedel 90+5'	Report	Griezmann (yellow card) 26'; Lino (yellow card) 67'; Barrios 29'; Correa (yellow card) 90+4'	Stadium: Stadio Olimpico; Attendance: 46,168; Referee: Slavko Vinčić (Slovenia)

4 October 2023 2	Celtic (Scotland)	1–2	(Italy) Lazio	Glasgow, Scotland
20:00 BST (UTC+1)	Furuhashi 12'; Phillips (yellow card) 45+2'; Palma (yellow card) 82'	Report	Vecino 29', (yellow card) 90+3'; Luis Alberto (yellow card) 61'; Castellanos (yellow card) 74'; Pedro 90+5'; Sepe (yellow card) 90+7'	Stadium: Celtic Park; Attendance: 56,063; Referee: Donatas Rumšas (Lithuania)

25 October 2023 3	Feyenoord (Netherlands)	3–1	(Italy) Lazio	Rotterdam, Netherlands
18:45 CEST (UTC+2)	Nieuwkoop (yellow card) 30'; Giménez 31', 74', (yellow card) 44'; Zerrouki 45+2'; López (yellow card) 48'; Hartman (yellow card) 58'; Geertruida (yellow card) 90+5'	Report	Rovella (yellow card) 28'; Casale (yellow card) 45+1'; Romagnoli (yellow card) 61'; Vecino (yellow card) 65'; Pedro 83' (pen.); Zaccagni (yellow card) 87'; Guendouzi (yellow card) 90'; Castellanos (yellow card) 90+5'	Stadium: De Kuip; Attendance: 44,031; Referee: Tobias Stieler (Germany)

7 November 2023 4	Lazio (Italy)	1–0	(Netherlands) Feyenoord	Rome, Italy
21:00 CET (UTC+1)	Immobile 45+1'; Vecino (yellow card) 68'; Rovella (yellow card) 90+6'	Report	Nieuwkoop (yellow card) 1'; Zerrouki (yellow card) 70'; Wieffer (yellow card) 77'	Stadium: Stadio Olimpico; Attendance: 36,612; Referee: Szymon Marciniak (Poland)

28 November 2023 5	Lazio (Italy)	2–0	(Scotland) Celtic	Rome, Italy
18:45 CET (UTC+1)	Rovella (yellow card) 50'; Immobile 82', 85'; Pedro (yellow card) 89'; Patric (yellow card) 90+3'	Report	Taylor (yellow card) 27'; Johnston (yellow card) 35'; O'Riley (yellow card) 71'; Yang (yellow card) 78'	Stadium: Stadio Olimpico; Attendance: 50,555; Referee: Halil Umut Meler (Turkey)

13 December 2023 6	Atlético Madrid (Spain)	2–0	(Italy) Lazio	Madrid, Spain
21:00 CET (UTC+1)	Griezmann 6'; Giménez (yellow card) 45+2'; Lino 51'	Report	Pedro (yellow card) 8'; Marušić (yellow card) 47'; Guendouzi (yellow card) 72'	Stadium: Metropolitano Stadium; Attendance: 63,574; Referee: Serdar Gözübüyük (Netherlands)

==== Knockout phase ====
===== Round of 16 =====
The draw for the round of 16 was held on 18 December 2023.

14 February 2024 First leg	Lazio (Italy)	1–0	(Germany) Bayern Munich	Rome, Italy
21:00 CET (UTC+1)	Immobile 69' (pen.)	Report	Upamecano (red card) 67'; Kimmich (yellow card) 68'	Stadium: Stadio Olimpico; Attendance: 57,470; Referee: François Letexier (France)

5 March 2024 Second leg	Bayern Munich (Germany)	3–0 (3–1 agg.)	(Italy) Lazio	Munich, Germany
21:00 CET (UTC+1)	Kane 38', 66'; Müller 45+2'	Report	Romagnoli (yellow card) 80'; Cataldi (yellow card) 89'; Pellegrini (yellow card) 90+2'	Stadium: Allianz Arena; Attendance: 75,000; Referee: Slavko Vinčić (Slovenia)

== Statistics ==
=== Appearances and goals ===
No.	Pos	Nat	Player	Total		Serie A		Coppa Italia		Supercoppa Italiana		Champions League	
No.	Pos	Nat	Player	Apps	Goals	Apps	Goals	Apps	Goals	Apps	Goals	Apps	Goals
Goalkeepers
33	GK	(Italy) ITA	Luigi Sepe	0	0	0	0	0	0	0	0	0	0
35	GK	(Greece) GRE	Christos Mandas	12	0	8+1	0	3	0	0	0	0	0
94	GK	(Italy) ITA	Ivan Provedel	40	1	30	0	1	0	1	0	8	1
Defenders
3	DF	(Italy) ITA	Luca Pellegrini	24	1	7+10	0	1+1	1	0+1	0	2+2	0
4	DF	(Spain) ESP	Patric	28	2	18+1	2	3+1	0	0	0	4+1	0
13	DF	(Italy) ITA	Alessio Romagnoli	39	0	26+3	0	3	0	1	0	6	0
15	DF	(Italy) ITA	Nicolò Casale	23	0	16+3	0	1+1	0	0	0	2	0
23	DF	(Albania) ALB	Elseid Hysaj	32	0	11+12	0	2+1	0	0+1	0	5	0
29	DF	(Italy) ITA	Manuel Lazzari	31	0	18+4	0	1	0	1	0	3+4	0
34	DF	(Spain) ESP	Mario Gila	28	0	20	0	3	0	1	0	4	0
46	DF	(Italy) ITA	Fabio Ruggeri	0	0	0	0	0	0	0	0	0	0
77	DF	(Montenegro) MNE	Adam Marušić	46	1	34	1	3+1	0	1	0	6+1	0
Midfielders
5	MF	(Uruguay) URU	Matías Vecino	42	7	8+23	6	3+1	0	1	0	6	1
6	MF	(Japan) JPN	Daichi Kamada	36	2	17+11	2	0+1	0	0	0	3+4	0
8	MF	(France) FRA	Mattéo Guendouzi	46	3	27+6	2	4	1	1	0	4+4	0
10	MF	(Spain) ESP	Luis Alberto	43	5	28+4	5	2	0	0+1	0	8	0
32	MF	(Italy) ITA	Danilo Cataldi	36	0	14+13	0	2+1	0	0+1	0	1+4	0
65	MF	(Italy) ITA	Nicolò Rovella	30	0	16+7	0	1+2	0	1	0	2+1	0
Forwards
7	FW	(Brazil) BRA	Felipe Anderson	50	5	32+5	5	3+1	0	1	0	7+1	0
9	FW	(Spain) ESP	Pedro	44	3	5+27	1	1+2	0	1	0	1+7	2
17	FW	(Italy) ITA	Ciro Immobile	41	11	19+10	7	1+2	0	1	0	7+1	4
18	FW	(Denmark) DEN	Gustav Isaksen	36	1	11+16	1	1+2	0	0+1	0	2+3	0
19	FW	(Argentina) ARG	Valentín Castellanos	45	6	16+18	4	3+1	2	0	0	1+6	0
20	FW	(Italy) ITA	Mattia Zaccagni	36	7	24+4	6	2	1	0	0	6	0
22	FW	(Paraguay) PAR	Diego González	0	0	0	0	0	0	0	0	0	0
70	FW	(Guinea-Bissau) GBS	Saná Fernandes	0	0	0	0	0	0	0	0	0	0
Players transferred out during the season
26	MF	(Croatia) CRO	Toma Bašić	1	0	0	0	0+1	0	0	0	0	0

Source: Competitions
