= 2024–25 SS Lazio season =

Lazio
2024–25 season
- Owner: Claudio Lotito
- President: Claudio Lotito
- Head coach: Marco Baroni
- Stadium: Stadio Olimpico
- Serie A: 7th
- Coppa Italia: Quarter-finals
- UEFA Europa League: Quarter-finals
- Top goalscorer: League: Valentín Castellanos; Pedro (10 each); All: Valentín Castellanos; Pedro (14 each)
- Highest home attendance: 63,800 vs Roma; 13 April 2025 (Serie A)
- Lowest home attendance: 27,259 vs Ludogorets Razgrad; 28 November 2024 (UEFA Europa League)
- Average home league attendance: 44,786
- Biggest win: 5–1 vs Como (A); 31 October 2024 (Serie A); 5–1 vs Monza (H); 9 February 2025 (Serie A)
- Biggest defeat: 0–6 vs Internazionale (H); 16 December 2024 (Serie A)
Home colours	Away colours	Third colours

The 2024–25 season was the 125th season in the history of SS Lazio, and the club's 37th consecutive season in Serie A. In addition to the domestic league, the club participated in the Coppa Italia and the UEFA Europa League.

== First-team squad ==
As of 3 February 2025

No.	Player	Nationality	Position	Date of birth (age)	Signed from	Signed in	Contract ends
Goalkeepers
35	Christos Mandas	(Greece)	GK	17 September 2001 (aged 23)	(Greece) OFI	2023	2028
55	Alessio Furlanetto	(Italy)	GK	7 February 2002 (aged 23)	Academy	2012	2025
59	Davide Renzetti	(Italy)	GK	9 June 2006 (aged 19)	Academy	2021	2027
94	Ivan Provedel	(Italy)	GK	17 March 1994 (aged 31)	Spezia	2022	2027
Defenders
2	Samuel Gigot	(France)	CB	12 October 1993 (aged 31)	(France) Marseille (loan)	2024	2025
3	Luca Pellegrini	(Italy)	LB / LWB	7 March 1999 (aged 26)	Juventus (loan)	2023	2025
4	Patric	(Spain)	CB / RB	17 April 1993 (aged 32)	(Spain) Barcelona Atlètic	2015	2027
13	Alessio Romagnoli	(Italy)	CB	12 January 1995 (aged 30)	Milan	2022	2027
23	Elseid Hysaj	(Albania)	RB / LB	2 February 1994 (aged 31)	Napoli	2021	2025
25	Oliver Provstgaard	(Denmark)	CB	4 June 2003 (aged 22)	(Denmark) Vejle	2025	2029
29	Manuel Lazzari	(Italy)	RWB / RB / RM	29 November 1993 (aged 31)	SPAL	2019	2027
30	Nuno Tavares	(Portugal)	LB / LWB	26 January 2000 (aged 25)	(England) Arsenal (loan)	2024	2025
34	Mario Gila	(Spain)	CB	29 August 2000 (aged 24)	(Spain) Real Madrid	2022	2027
76	Filipe Bordon	(Brazil)	CB / DM	24 June 2005 (aged 20)	(Brazil) Ferroviária	2024	2027
77	Adam Marušić	(Montenegro)	RB / RWB / LB	17 October 1992 (aged 32)	(Belgium) Oostende	2017	2025
78	Marco Milani	(Italy)	CB	14 June 2005 (aged 20)	Academy	2018	2025
Midfielders
5	Matías Vecino	(Uruguay)	CM / DM	24 August 1991 (aged 33)	Internazionale	2022	2025
6	Nicolò Rovella	(Italy)	DM / CM	4 December 2001 (aged 23)	Juventus (loan)	2023	2025
7	Fisayo Dele-Bashiru	(Nigeria)	CM / AM	6 February 2001 (aged 24)	(Turkey) Hatayspor (loan)	2024	2028
8	Mattéo Guendouzi	(France)	CM / DM	14 April 1999 (aged 26)	(France) Marseille	2023	2028
21	Reda Belahyane	(Morocco)	DM	1 June 2004 (aged 21)	Hellas Verona	2025	2029
26	Toma Bašić	(Croatia)	CM / DM	25 November 1996 (aged 28)	(France) Bordeaux	2021	2026
28	André Anderson	(Italy)	AM / CM	23 September 1999 (aged 25)	(Brazil) Santos	2018	2025
Forwards
9	Pedro	(Spain)	RW / LW / AM	28 July 1987 (aged 37)	Roma	2021	2025
10	Mattia Zaccagni (C)	(Italy)	LW / CM / AM	16 June 1995 (aged 30)	Hellas Verona	2022	2027
11	Valentín Castellanos	(Argentina)	ST	3 October 1998 (aged 26)	(United States) New York City FC	2023	2028
14	Tijjani Noslin	(Netherlands)	RW / ST	7 July 1999 (aged 25)	Hellas Verona	2024	2027
18	Gustav Isaksen	(Denmark)	RW / LW / ST	19 April 2001 (aged 24)	(Denmark) Midtjylland	2023	2028
19	Boulaye Dia	(Senegal)	ST / AM	16 November 1996 (aged 28)	Salernitana	2024	2029
20	Loum Tchaouna	(France)	RW	8 September 2003 (aged 21)	Salernitana	2024	2027
27	Arijon Ibrahimović	(Germany)	LW / AM	11 December 2005 (aged 19)	(Germany) Bayern Munich (loan)	2025	2025

== Transfers ==
=== Summer window ===
==== In ====
Date	Pos.	Player	From	Fee	Notes	Ref.
1 July 2024	MF	(Ivory Coast) Jean-Daniel Akpa Akpro	(Italy) Monza	Loan return		
1 July 2024	GK	(Italy) Alessio Furlanetto	(Italy) Fermana	Loan return		
1 July 2024	MF	(Croatia) Toma Bašić	(Italy) Salernitana	Loan return		
1 July 2024	DF	(Brazil) Filipe Bordon	(Brazil) Ferroviária	€500,000	Loan transfer made permanent	
1 July 2024	MF	(France) Mattéo Guendouzi	(France) Marseille	€13,000,000	Loan transfer made permanent	
1 July 2024	MF	(Spain) Cristóbal Muñoz	(Spain) Barcelona	Free		
1 July 2024	FW	(Netherlands) Tijjani Noslin	(Italy) Hellas Verona	€12,000,000		
1 July 2024	FW	(France) Loum Tchaouna	(Italy) Salernitana	€10,000,000		
9 July 2024	FW	(Italy) Gabriele Artistico	(Italy) Virtus Francavilla	Free		
19 July 2024	MF	(Italy) Gaetano Castrovilli	(Italy) Fiorentina	Free		

==== Loans in ====
Date	Pos.	Player	From	Fee	Notes	Ref.
6 July 2024	MF	(Nigeria) Fisayo Dele-Bashiru	(Turkey) Hatayspor	€2,000,000	Obligation to buy for €3,680,000 under certain conditions	
15 July 2024	DF	(Portugal) Nuno Tavares	(England) Arsenal	Free	Obligation to buy for €5,000,000 under certain conditions	
16 August 2024	FW	(Senegal) Boulaye Dia	(Italy) Salernitana	Free	Until 30 June 2026, obligation to buy for €11,300,000 under certain conditions	
30 August 2024	DF	(France) Samuel Gigot	(France) Marseille	€500,000	Obligation to buy for €3,000,000 under certain conditions	

==== Out ====
Date	Pos.	Player	To	Fee	Notes	Ref.
30 June 2024	MF	(Italy) Cristiano Lombardi	Retired			
30 June 2024	GK	(Italy) Luigi Sepe	(Italy) Salernitana	End of loan		
1 July 2024	GK	(Lithuania) Marius Adamonis	(Italy) Catania	Free		
1 July 2024	FW	(Brazil) Felipe Anderson	(Brazil) Palmeiras	Free	End of contract	
1 July 2024	MF	(Japan) Daichi Kamada	(England) Crystal Palace	Free	End of contract	
1 July 2024	MF	(Spain) Luis Alberto	(Qatar) Al-Duhail	€10,500,000		
1 July 2024	GK	(Portugal) Luís Maximiano	(Spain) Almería	€8,100,000	Loan transfer made permanent	
1 July 2024	MF	(Spain) Raúl Moro	(Spain) Valladolid	€2,500,000	Loan transfer made permanent	
1 July 2024	DF	(Italy) Mattia Novella	(Italy) Potenza	Free		
12 July 2024	FW	(Italy) Ciro Immobile	(Turkey) Beşiktaş	€2,000,000		
13 July 2024	FW	(Italy) Gabriele Artistico	(Italy) Juve Stabia	Free	Option to buy for an undisclosed fee with a buy-back option for an undisclosed fee	
22 July 2024	MF	(Italy) Andrea Marino	(Italy) Trapani	Free		

==== Loans out ====
Date	Pos.	Player	To	Fee	Notes	Ref.
5 July 2024	DF	(Italy) Romano Floriani Mussolini	(Italy) Juve Stabia	Free	Option to buy for an undisclosed fee with a buy-back option for an undisclosed fee	
9 July 2024	FW	(Italy) Valerio Crespi	(Italy) Südtirol	Free		
12 July 2024	MF	(Italy) Marco Bertini	(Italy) Ascoli	Free	Option to buy for an undisclosed fee with a buy-back option for an undisclosed fee	
24 July 2024	MF	(Brazil) Marcos Antônio	(Brazil) São Paulo	€150,000	Obligation to buy for €5,000,000	
7 August 2024	FW	(Guinea-Bissau) Saná Fernandes	(Netherlands) NAC Breda	Free	Option to buy for an undisclosed fee with a buy-back option for an undisclosed fee	
14 August 2024	FW	(Italy) Matteo Cancellieri	(Italy) Parma	€1,200,000	Option to buy for €8,000,000	
20 August 2024	DF	(Algeria) Mohamed Farès	(Greece) Panserraikos	Free	Option to buy for an undisclosed fee	
30 August 2024	DF	(Italy) Nicolò Casale	(Italy) Bologna	€1,500,000	Option to buy for €7,500,000	
30 August 2024	MF	(Italy) Danilo Cataldi	(Italy) Fiorentina	Free	Option to buy for €4,000,000	

=== Winter window ===
==== In ====
Date	Pos.	Player	From	Fee	Notes	Ref.
8 January 2025	FW	(Italy) Gabriele Artistico	(Italy) Juve Stabia	Loan terminated early		
30 January 2025	FW	(Italy) Valerio Crespi	(Italy) Südtirol	Loan terminated early		
3 February 2025	MF	(Morocco) Reda Belahyane	(Italy) Hellas Verona	€9,500,000		
3 February 2025	DF	(Denmark) Oliver Provstgaard	(Denmark) Vejle	€4,000,000		

==== Loans in ====
Date	Pos.	Player	From	Fee	Notes	Ref.
13 January 2025	FW	(Germany) Arijon Ibrahimović	(Germany) Bayern Munich	Free	Option to buy for €8,000,000 with a buy-back option for €25,000,000	

==== Out ====
Date	Pos.	Player	To	Fee	Notes	Ref.

==== Loans out ====
Date	Pos.	Player	To	Fee	Notes	Ref.
2 January 2025	MF	(Ivory Coast) Jean-Daniel Akpa Akpro	(Italy) Monza	Free		
2 January 2025	FW	(Paraguay) Diego González	(Mexico) Atlas	Free	Option to buy for an undisclosed fee	
9 January 2025	FW	(Italy) Gabriele Artistico	(Italy) Cosenza	Free		
31 January 2025	MF	(Italy) Gaetano Castrovilli	(Italy) Monza	Free		
31 January 2025	FW	(Italy) Valerio Crespi	(Italy) Feralpisalò	Free	Option to buy for an undisclosed fee	

== Friendlies ==
=== Pre-season ===
Win Draw Loss Fixtures

14 July 2024 Friendly	Lazio (Italy)	23–0	(Italy) Auronzo	Auronzo di Cadore, Italy
18:00 CEST (UTC+2)	Castellanos 3', 28'; Pedro 20', 30' (pen.), 43'; Casale 23'; Guendouzi 27'; Isaksen 42'; Noslin 48', 72', 73'; Vecino 56', 65'; Tchaouna 56', 79', 88'; Fernandes 57', 60', 86'; Dele-Bashiru 64', 74'; Bašić 70'; Akpa Akpro 81'	Report		Stadium: Rodolfo Zandegiacomo; Referee: Marco Menozzi

18 July 2024 Friendly	Lazio (Italy)	3–1	(Italy) Trapani	Auronzo di Cadore, Italy
18:00 CEST (UTC+2)	Castellanos 15' (pen.), 20'; Noslin 86'	Report	Kragl 30'	Stadium: Rodolfo Zandegiacomo; Referee: Mattia Drigo

21 July 2024 Friendly	Lazio (Italy)	1–1	(Italy) Triestina	Auronzo di Cadore, Italy
18:00 CEST (UTC+2)	Guendouzi 8' (pen.)	Report	Lazzari 81' (o.g.)	Stadium: Rodolfo Zandegiacomo; Referee: Roberto Lovison

27 July 2024 Friendly	Hansa Rostock (Germany)	0–3	(Italy) Lazio	Rostock, Germany
15:00 CEST (UTC+2)	Schumacher (yellow card) 4'; Pfanne (yellow card) 38'	Report	Rovella (yellow card) 15'; Zaccagni 44'; Castellanos 50'; Casale (yellow card) 66'; Tchaouna 71'; Cataldi (yellow card) 77'	Stadium: Ostseestadion; Attendance: 21,200; Referee: Bastian Dankert (Germany)

3 August 2024 Friendly	Frosinone (Italy)	0–2	(Italy) Lazio	Frosinone, Italy
20:45 CEST (UTC+2)	Kvernadze (yellow card) 45+2'	Report	Guendouzi (yellow card) 45+2'; Zaccagni 65'; Vecino 90+3'	Stadium: Stadio Benito Stirpe; Referee: Davide Di Marco

7 August 2024 Friendly	Southampton (England)	1–1	(Italy) Lazio	Southampton, England
19:30 BST (UTC+1)	Brereton 5'; Alcaraz (red card) 62'; Charles (yellow card) 65'	Report	Guendouzi (yellow card) 27'; Castellanos 32', (yellow card) 41'; Pellegrini (yellow card) 43'; Romagnoli (red card) 62'; Gila (yellow card) 65'; Zaccagni (yellow card) 71'	Stadium: St Mary's Stadium; Referee: Tim Robinson (England)

10 August 2024 Ramón de Carranza Trophy	Cádiz (Spain)	0–1	(Italy) Lazio	Cádiz, Spain
21:00 CEST (UTC+2)	Carcelén (yellow card) 41'; Glauder (yellow card) 79'	Report	Noslin 71'; Guendouzi (yellow card) 72'; Pellegrini (yellow card) 75'; Castellanos (yellow card) 79'	Stadium: Nuevo Mirandilla

10 August 2024 Friendly	RB Leipzig (Germany)	Cancelled	(Italy) Lazio	Leipzig, Germany
18:00 CEST (UTC+2)				Stadium: Red Bull Arena

== Competitions ==
=== Overall record ===
Competition	First match	Last match	Starting round	Final position	Record							
Competition	First match	Last match	Starting round	Final position	Pld	W	D	L	GF	GA	GD	Win %
Serie A	18 August 2024	25 May 2025	Matchday 1	7th	38	18	11	9	61	49	+12	47.37
Coppa Italia	5 December 2024	25 February 2025	Round of 16	Quarter-finals	2	1	0	1	3	3	+0	50.00
UEFA Europa League	25 September 2024	17 April 2025	League phase	Quarter-finals	12	8	2	2	23	10	+13	66.67
Total					52	27	13	12	87	62	+25	51.92

Source: Soccerway

=== Serie A ===
==== League table ====
Pos	Team	Pld	W	D	L	GF	GA	GD	Pts	Qualification or relegation
5	Roma	38	20	9	9	56	35	+21	69	Qualification for the Europa League league phase
6	Fiorentina	38	19	8	11	60	41	+19	65 (Note: Fiorentina finished ahead of Lazio on head-to-head points: Fiorentina 2–1 Lazio, Lazio 1–2 Fiorentina.)	Qualification for the Conference League play-off round
7	Lazio	38	18	11	9	61	49	+12	65	
8	Milan	38	18	9	11	61	43	+18	63	
9	Bologna	38	16	14	8	57	47	+10	62	Qualification for the Europa League league phase (Note: Bologna qualified for the Europa League league stage as the winners of the 2024–25 Coppa Italia.)

Source: Serie A
Rules for classification: 1) Points; 2) Tiebreaker for Champions team and third relegated team; 3) Head-to-head points; 4) Head-to-head goal difference; 5) Goal difference; 6) Goals scored; 7) Draw.
(Note: Head-to-head record is used only after all the matches between the teams in question have been played)

==== Results summary ====
Overall								Home						Away					
Pld	W	D	L	GF	GA	GD	Pts	W	D	L	GF	GA	GD	W	D	L	GF	GA	GD
38	18	11	9	61	49	+12	65	7	9	3	33	26	+7	11	2	6	28	23	+5

Source: Serie A

==== Results by round ====
Round	1	2	3	4	5	6	7	8	9	10	11	12	13	14	15	16	17	18	19	20	21	22	23	24	25	26	27	28	29	30	31	32	33	34	35	36	37	38
Ground	H	A	H	H	A	A	H	A	H	A	H	A	H	A	A	H	A	H	A	H	A	H	H	A	H	A	A	H	A	H	A	H	A	H	A	H	A	H
Result	W	L	D	W	L	W	W	L	W	W	W	W	W	L	W	L	W	D	L	D	W	L	W	W	D	D	W	D	L	D	W	D	W	D	W	D	D	L
Position	4	9	8	6	8	7	4	7	6	5	5	5	5	5	5	5	4	4	4	4	4	4	4	4	5	5	5	5	6	7	6	6	6	7	6	5	6	7

Source: Serie A
A = Away; H = Home; W = Win; D = Draw; L = Loss

The league fixtures were announced on 4 July 2024.

==== Matches ====
18 August 2024 1	Lazio	3–1	Venezia	Rome
20:45 CEST (UTC+2)	Castellanos 11', (yellow card) 52'; Zaccagni 44' (pen.); Altare 81' (o.g.)	Report	Andersen 3'; Sagrado (yellow card) 32'; Haps (yellow card) 71'	Stadium: Stadio Olimpico; Attendance: 42,000; Referee: Paride Tremolada

24 August 2024 2	Udinese	2–1	Lazio	Udine
18:30 CEST (UTC+2)	Lucca 5'; Giannetti (yellow card) 32'; Kamara (yellow card) 49' (yellow-red card) 68'; Thauvin 49'; Payero (yellow card) 62'	Report	Romagnoli (yellow card) 80'; Isaksen 90+5'	Stadium: Stadio Friuli; Attendance: 21,636; Referee: Daniele Doveri

31 August 2024 3	Lazio	2–2	Milan	Rome
20:45 CEST (UTC+2)	Rovella (yellow card) 39'; Castellanos 62'; Zaccagni (yellow card) 64'; Dia 66'; Patric (yellow card) 85'; Guendouzi (yellow card) 90+3'	Report	Pavlović 8'; Fofana (yellow card) 20'; Leão 72'; Terracciano (yellow card) 90+1'	Stadium: Stadio Olimpico; Attendance: 53,000; Referee: Davide Massa

16 September 2024 4	Lazio	2–1	Hellas Verona	Rome
20:45 CEST (UTC+2)	Dia 5'; Castellanos 20'; Rovella (yellow card) 27'; Gila (yellow card) 44'	Report	Tengstedt 7', (yellow card) 84'; Tchatchoua (yellow card) 30'	Stadium: Stadio Olimpico; Attendance: 35,500; Referee: Luca Zufferli

22 September 2024 5	Fiorentina	2–1	Lazio	Florence
12:30 CEST (UTC+2)	Gosens (yellow card) 11'; Biraghi (yellow card) 42'; Guðmundsson 49' (pen.), 90' (pen.); Dodô (yellow card) 90+5'	Report	Isaksen (yellow card) 26'; Gila 41'; Patric (yellow card) 85'; Tavares (yellow card) 89'; Guendouzi (yellow card) 89'	Stadium: Stadio Artemio Franchi; Attendance: 19,624; Referee: Matteo Marcenaro

29 September 2024 6	Torino	2–3	Lazio	Turin
12:30 CEST (UTC+2)	Sanabria (yellow card) 54'; Adams 67'; Ilić (yellow card) 72'; Coco 90+2'	Report	Guendouzi 8'; Dia 60'; Isaksen (yellow card) 62'; Gila (yellow card) 72'; Zaccagni (yellow card) 75'; Noslin 89'	Stadium: Stadio Olimpico Grande Torino; Attendance: 23,130; Referee: Simone Sozza

6 October 2024 7	Lazio	2–1	Empoli	Rome
15:00 CEST (UTC+2)	Zaccagni 45+4'; Rovella (yellow card) 45+5'; Castellanos (penalty missed) 51', (yellow card) 53'; Pedro 84'	Report	Esposito 9'; Pezzella (yellow card) 29'; Fazzini (yellow card) 31'; Gyasi (yellow card) 78'; Grassi (yellow card) 82'	Stadium: Stadio Olimpico; Attendance: 42,000; Referee: Giovanni Ayroldi

19 October 2024 8	Juventus	1–0	Lazio	Turin
20:45 CEST (UTC+2)	Locatelli (yellow card) 45+2'; Savona (yellow card) 50'; Fagioli (yellow card) 60'; Gila 85' (o.g.); Douglas Luiz (yellow card) 90'	Report	Romagnoli (red card) 24'; Vecino (yellow card) 90+4'; Pedro (yellow card) 90+5'	Stadium: Juventus Stadium; Attendance: 40,800; Referee: Juan Luca Sacchi

27 October 2024 9	Lazio	3–0	Genoa	Rome
15:00 CEST (UTC+2)	Noslin 21', (yellow card) 29'; Gila (yellow card) 55'; Marušić (yellow card) 67'; Pedro 86'; Vecino 90+4'	Report	Sabelli (yellow card) 23'	Stadium: Stadio Olimpico; Attendance: 43,000; Referee: Marco Piccinini

31 October 2024 10	Como	1–5	Lazio	Como
20:45 CET (UTC+1)	Braunöder (yellow card) 45+2' (yellow-red card) 62'; Mazzitelli 53'	Report	Castellanos 28' (pen.), 81', (yellow card) 36'; Pedro 31'; Vecino (yellow card) 45'; Tavares (yellow card) 57' (yellow-red card) 65'; Isaksen (yellow card) 63'; Patric 71'; Tchaouna 90+5'	Stadium: Stadio Giuseppe Sinigaglia; Attendance: 10,750; Referee: Luca Pairetto

4 November 2024 11	Lazio	2–1	Cagliari	Rome
20:45 CET (UTC+1)	Dia 2'; Noslin (yellow card) 25'; Lazzari (yellow card) 61'; Zaccagni 76' (pen.); Rovella (yellow card) 85'	Report	Adopo (yellow card) 9' (yellow-red card) 78'; Augello (yellow card) 17'; Mina (yellow card) 29' (yellow-red card) 78'; Luvumbo 41', (yellow card) 64'; Zappa (yellow card) 49'; Luperto (yellow card) 74'	Stadium: Stadio Olimpico; Attendance: 38,599; Referee: Giovanni Ayroldi

10 November 2024 12	Monza	0–1	Lazio	Monza
18:00 CET (UTC+1)	Carboni (yellow card) 17'; Pereira (yellow card) 18'; Bianco (yellow card) 55'; Maldini (yellow card) 57'; Pessina (yellow card) 73'	Report	Zaccagni 36'; Isaksen (yellow card) 77'	Stadium: Stadio Brianteo; Attendance: 11,706; Referee: Andrea Colombo

24 November 2024 13	Lazio	3–0	Bologna	Rome
20:45 CET (UTC+1)	Gigot (yellow card) 63', (goal) 68'; Zaccagni 72'; Tchaouna (yellow card) 84'; Pellegrini (yellow card) 90+1'; Dele-Bashiru 90+2'	Report	Pobega (yellow card) 23' (yellow-red card) 35'; Holm (yellow card) 90+1'	Stadium: Stadio Olimpico; Attendance: 40,500; Referee: Antonio Rapuano

1 December 2024 14	Parma	3–1	Lazio	Parma
15:00 CET (UTC+1)	Man 6'; Keita (yellow card) 33'; Bonny (yellow card) 45+7'; Haj Mohamed 53'; Estévez (yellow card) 57'; Balogh (yellow card) 64'; Delprato 90+1'	Report	Rovella (yellow card) 30'; Gila (yellow card) 45+7'; Castellanos 80', (yellow card) 90'	Stadium: Stadio Ennio Tardini; Attendance: 22,885; Referee: Luca Zufferli

8 December 2024 15	Napoli	0–1	Lazio	Naples
20:45 CET (UTC+1)	McTominay (yellow card) 46'; Rrahmani (yellow card) 51'	Report	Dia (yellow card) 19'; Guendouzi (yellow card) 45+1'; Castellanos (yellow card) 62'; Isaksen 79'	Stadium: Stadio Diego Armando Maradona; Attendance: 50,000; Referee: Andrea Colombo

16 December 2024 16	Lazio	0–6	Internazionale	Rome
20:45 CET (UTC+1)	Rovella (yellow card) 40'; Zaccagni (yellow card) 80'	Report	Çalhanoğlu (yellow card) 24', (goal) 41' (pen.); Bastoni (yellow card) 31'; Bisseck (yellow card) 44'; Dimarco 45'; Barella 51'; Dumfries 53'; Darmian (yellow card) 75'; Carlos Augusto 77'; Thuram 90'	Stadium: Stadio Olimpico; Attendance: 60,200; Referee: Daniele Chiffi

21 December 2024 17	Lecce	1–2	Lazio	Lecce
20:45 CET (UTC+1)	Guilbert (red card) 45+1'; Morente 50'; Dorgu (yellow card) 69'; Rebić (yellow card) 71'; Ramadani (yellow card) 90'	Report	Castellanos 45+3' (pen.); Tchaouna (yellow card) 82'; Marušić 87'	Stadium: Stadio Via del mare Attendance: 26,749; Referee: Gianluca Manganiello

28 December 2024 18	Lazio	1–1	Atalanta	Rome
20:45 CET (UTC+1)	Dele-Bashiru 27'; Hien (yellow card) 34'; Zaccagni (yellow card) 69'; Rovella (yellow card) 90'	Report	Cuadrado (yellow card) 70'; Brescianini 88'; Lookman (yellow card) 90+4'	Stadium: Stadio Olimpico; Attendance: 48,700; Referee: Davide Massa

5 January 2025 19	Roma	2–0	Lazio	Rome
20:45 CET (UTC+1)	Pellegrini 10'; Saelemaekers 18', (yellow card) 37'; Dybala (yellow card) 71'; Paredes (yellow card) 78'; Ndicka (yellow card) 90+5'	Report	Gila (yellow card) 32'; Zaccagni (yellow card) 34'; Castellanos (yellow card) 41', (red card) 90+5'; Rovella (yellow card) 54'; Dia (yellow card) 72'	Stadium: Stadio Olimpico; Attendance: 65,042; Referee: Marco Guida

10 January 2025 20	Lazio	1–1	Como	Rome
20:45 CET (UTC+1)	Dia 34'; Pellegrini (yellow card) 51'; Tchaouna (yellow card) 57' (yellow-red card) 58'; Rovella (yellow card) 63'	Report	Kempf (yellow card) 28'; Cutrone 72'; Diao (yellow card) 63'; Engelhardt (yellow card) 84'	Stadium: Stadio Olimpico; Attendance: 39,990; Referee: Paride Tremolada

19 January 2025 21	Hellas Verona	0–3	Lazio	Verona
18:00 CET (UTC+1)	Dawidowicz (yellow card) 26'; Coppola (yellow card) 48'; Bradarić (yellow card) 49'; Ghilardi (yellow card) 77'; Duda (yellow card) 78' (yellow-red card) 89'	Report	Gigot 2', (yellow card) 14'; Dia 21'; Zaccagni 58'; Tavares (yellow card) 72'	Stadium: Stadio Marcantonio Bentegodi; Attendance: 25,747; Referee: Michael Fabbri

26 January 2025 22	Lazio	1–2	Fiorentina	Rome
20:45 CET (UTC+1)	Pedro (yellow card) 90'; Marušić 90+2'	Report	Adli 11', (yellow card) 63'; Beltrán 17'; Dodô (yellow card) 70'; Mandragora (yellow card) 71'	Stadium: Stadio Olimpico; Attendance: 38,000; Referee: Antonio Rapuano

3 February 2025 23	Cagliari	1–2	Lazio	Cagliari
20:45 CET (UTC+1)	Piccoli 55'	Report	Zaccagni 41'; Castellanos 64'	Stadium: Unipol Domus; Attendance: 15,751; Referee: Gianluca Manganiello

9 February 2025 24	Lazio	5–1	Monza	Rome
15:00 CET (UTC+1)	Marušić 31'; Pedro 57', 77'; Castellanos 63'; Dele-Bashiru 88'	Report	Pereira (yellow card) 45'; Sensi 86' (pen.)	Stadium: Stadio Olimpico; Attendance: 38,500; Referee: Gianluca Aureliano

15 February 2025 25	Lazio	2–2	Napoli	Rome
18:00 CET (UTC+1)	Isaksen 6'; Zaccagni (yellow card) 79'; Dia 87'; Rovella (yellow card) 90+1'	Report	Raspadori 13'; Zambo Anguissa (yellow card) 35'; Marušić 64' (o.g.); Juan Jesus (yellow card) 78'	Stadium: Stadio Olimpico; Attendance: 42,900; Referee: Davide Massa

22 February 2025 26	Venezia	0–0	Lazio	Venice
15:00 CET (UTC+1)	Nicolussi Caviglia (yellow card) 75'; Ellertsson (yellow card) 78'; Schingtienne (yellow card) 86'; Condé (yellow card) 90+2'	Report	Guendouzi (yellow card) 47'; Zaccagni (yellow card) 90+4'	Stadium: Stadio Pier Luigi Penzo; Attendance: 8,796; Referee: Matteo Marchetti

2 March 2025 27	Milan	1–2	Lazio	Milan
20:45 CET (UTC+1)	Pavlović (red card) 67'; Giménez (yellow card) 76'; Leão (yellow card) 80'; Chukwueze 84'	Report	Zaccagni 28'; Vecino (yellow card) 90+2'; Pedro 90+8' (pen.)	Stadium: San Siro; Attendance: 65,969; Referee: Gianluca Manganiello

10 March 2025 28	Lazio	1–1	Udinese	Rome
20:45 CET (UTC+1)	Romagnoli 32'; Vecino (yellow card) 52'; Lazzari (yellow card) 62'	Report	Kamara (yellow card) 8'; Thauvin 22'; Lovrić (yellow card) 60'; Payero (yellow card) 76'; Karlström (yellow card) 90+1'	Stadium: Stadio Olimpico; Attendance: 34,250; Referee: Marco Piccinini

16 March 2025 29	Bologna	5–0	Lazio	Bologna
15:00 CET (UTC+1)	Odgaard 16'; Freuler (yellow card) 33'; Orsolini 48'; Ndoye 49'; Castro 74', (yellow card) 76'; Fabbian 84'	Report	Gila (yellow card) 44'; Vecino (yellow card) 57'; Romagnoli (yellow card) 90+1'	Stadium: Stadio Renato Dall'Ara; Attendance: 30,846; Referee: Andrea Colombo

31 March 2025 30	Lazio	1–1	Torino	Rome
20:45 CEST (UTC+2)	Zaccagni (yellow card) 40'; Marušić 57'; Guendouzi (yellow card) 69'; Romagnoli (yellow card) 90+2'	Report	Lazaro (yellow card) 7'; Maripán (yellow card) 45+4'; Ricci (yellow card) 57'; Walukiewicz (yellow card) 65'; Gineitis 82'	Stadium: Stadio Olimpico; Attendance: 38,500; Referee: Davide Massa

6 April 2025 31	Atalanta	0–1	Lazio	Bergamo
18:00 CEST (UTC+2)	Kolašinac (yellow card) 77'	Report	Rovella (yellow card) 40'; Isaksen 54'; Lazzari (yellow card) 88'	Stadium: Gewiss Stadium; Attendance: 22,731; Referee: Daniele Chiffi

13 April 2025 32	Lazio	1–1	Roma	Rome
20:45 CEST (UTC+2)	Zaccagni (yellow card) 30'; Isaksen (yellow card) 45+1'; Romagnoli 47'; Pellegrini (yellow card) 63'; Rovella (yellow card) 88'	Report	Paredes (yellow card) 5'; Mancini (yellow card) 55'; Soulé 69'	Stadium: Stadio Olimpico; Attendance: 63,800; Referee: Simone Sozza

23 April 2025 33	Genoa	0–2	Lazio	Genoa
18:30 CEST (UTC+2)	Otoa (red card) 22'; Pinamonti (yellow card) 51'; De Winter (yellow card) 80'; Sabelli (yellow card) 85'	Report	Castellanos 32'; Rovella (yellow card) 45+3'; Dia 65'; Belahyane (red card) 73'	Stadium: Stadio Luigi Ferraris; Attendance: 32,038; Referee: Giovanni Ayroldi
Note: The match was originally scheduled for 21 April 2025, but was postponed due to the death of Pope Francis.

28 April 2025 34	Lazio	2–2	Parma	Rome
20:45 CEST (UTC+2)	Castellanos (yellow card) 50'; Pedro 79', 84'	Report	Ondrejka 3', 46'; Leoni (yellow card) 54'; Hernani (yellow card) 75'; Đurić (yellow card) 80'	Stadium: Stadio Olimpico; Attendance: 37,000; Referee: Juan Luca Sacchi
Note: The match was initially scheduled for 26 April 2025 at 20:45, but was postponed due to the funeral of Pope Francis.

4 May 2025 35	Empoli	0–1	Lazio	Empoli
12:30 CEST (UTC+2)	Colombo (yellow card) 34' (yellow-red card) 38'; Goglichidze (yellow card) 45+2'; Pezzella (yellow card) 84'; Viti (yellow card) 89'	Report	Dia 1'; Pellegrini (yellow card) 56'; Hysaj (yellow card) 66' (yellow-red card) 76'; Vecino (yellow card) 87'; Provstgaard (yellow card) 90+4'	Stadium: Stadio Carlo Castellani; Attendance: 8,787; Referee: Andrea Colombo

10 May 2025 36	Lazio	1–1	Juventus	Rome
18:00 CEST (UTC+2)	Castellanos (yellow card) 69'; Pellegrini (yellow card) 80'; Guendouzi (yellow card) 90'; Vecino (yellow card) 90', (goal) 90+6'; Zaccagni (yellow card) 90+2'	Report	Thuram (yellow card) 21'; Savona (yellow card) 28'; Kolo Muani 51'; Locatelli (yellow card) 55'; Kalulu (red card) 60'; McKennie (yellow card) 90+3'	Stadium: Stadio Olimpico; Attendance: 60,500; Referee: Davide Massa

18 May 2025 37	Internazionale	2–2	Lazio	Milan
20:45 CEST (UTC+2)	Çalhanoğlu (yellow card) 38'; Bisseck 45+2'; Dumfries 79'	Report	Castellanos (yellow card) 45'; Gila (yellow card) 61'; Pedro 72', 90' (pen.); Romagnoli (yellow card) 78'	Stadium: San Siro; Attendance: 80,018; Referee: Daniele Chiffi

25 May 2025 38	Lazio	0–1	Lecce	Rome
20:45 CEST (UTC+2)	Guendouzi (yellow card) 32'; Romagnoli (red card) 90+3'; Gila (yellow card) 90+5'	Report	Pierotti (yellow card) 37' (yellow-red card) 45+2'; Coulibaly 43'; Rebić (red card) 45+4'; Falcone (yellow card) 69'	Stadium: Stadio Olimpico; Attendance: 54,000; Referee: Michael Fabbri
Note: Rebić received a red card from the bench as an unused substitute.

=== Coppa Italia ===
5 December 2024 Round of 16	Lazio	3–1	Napoli	Rome
21:00 CET (UTC+1)	Zaccagni (penalty missed) 21', (yellow card) 57'; Noslin 32', 41', 50'; Hysaj (yellow card) 80'	Report	Marín (yellow card) 26'; Simeone 36'; Neres (yellow card) 84'	Stadium: Stadio Olimpico; Attendance: 35,303; Referee: Luca Pairetto

25 February 2025 Quarter-finals	Internazionale	2–0	Lazio	Milan
21:00 CET (UTC+1)	Asllani (yellow card) 14'; Arnautović 39'; Çalhanoğlu 77' (pen.); Dumfries (yellow card) 85'	Report	Isaksen (yellow card) 33'; Pellegrini (yellow card) 36'; Gigot (yellow card) 75'; Guendouzi (yellow card) 76'; Ibrahimović (yellow card) 79'	Stadium: San Siro; Attendance: 53,333; Referee: Michael Fabbri

=== UEFA Europa League ===
==== League phase ====
The draw for the league phase was held on 30 August 2024.

Pos	Team	Pld	W	D	L	GF	GA	GD	Pts	Qualification
1	(Italian Football Federation) Lazio	8	6	1	1	17	5	+12	19	Advance to round of 16 (seeded)
2	(Royal Spanish Football Federation) Athletic Bilbao	8	6	1	1	15	7	+8	19	Advance to round of 16 (seeded)
3	(The Football Association) Manchester United	8	5	3	0	16	9	+7	18	Advance to round of 16 (seeded)
4	(The Football Association) Tottenham Hotspur	8	5	2	1	17	9	+8	17	Advance to round of 16 (seeded)
5	(German Football Association) Eintracht Frankfurt	8	5	1	2	14	10	+4	16	Advance to round of 16 (seeded)

Source: UEFA
Rules for classification: League phase tiebreakers

Round	1	2	3	4	5	6	7	8
Ground	A	H	A	H	H	A	H	A
Result	W	W	W	W	D	W	W	L
Position	3	1	1	1	1	1	1	1

Source: UEFA
A = Away; H = Home; W = Win; D = Draw; L = Loss

25 September 2024 1	Dynamo Kyiv (Ukraine)	0–3	(Italy) Lazio	Hamburg, Germany
21:00 CEST (UTC+2)	Dubinchak (yellow card) 63'; Braharu (red card) 73'; Mykhavko (yellow card) 90+3'	Report	Dia 5', 35'; Dele-Bashiru 34'; Noslin (red card) 82'; Romagnoli (yellow card) 88'	Stadium: Volksparkstadion; Attendance: 7,751; Referee: Anastasios Sidiropoulos (Greece)
Note: Due to the Russian invasion of Ukraine, Dynamo Kyiv were required to play their home matches at neutral venues until further notice.

3 October 2024 2	Lazio (Italy)	4–1	(France) Nice	Rome, Italy
18:45 CEST (UTC+2)	Pedro 20'; Castellanos 35', 53'; Zaccagni (yellow card) 59', (goal) 67' (pen.); Pellegrini (yellow card) 85'	Report	Louchet (yellow card) 19'; Boga 41'; Bombito (yellow card) 51'; Bułka (yellow card) 66'	Stadium: Stadio Olimpico; Attendance: 27,314; Referee: Horațiu Feșnic (Romania)

24 October 2024 3	Twente (Netherlands)	0–2	(Italy) Lazio	Enschede, Netherlands
21:00 CEST (UTC+2)	Unnerstall (red card) 11'; Van Wolfswinkel (yellow card) 63'; Van Rooij (yellow card) 68'; Bruns (yellow card) 69'; Vlap (yellow card) 72'	Report	Pedro 35'; Isaksen 87'	Stadium: De Grolsch Veste; Attendance: 29,500; Referee: Nikola Dabanović (Montenegro)

7 November 2024 4	Lazio (Italy)	2–1	(Portugal) Porto	Rome, Italy
21:00 CET (UTC+1)	Gigot (yellow card) 4'; Zaccagni (yellow card) 28'; Romagnoli 45+2'; Guendouzi (yellow card) 81'; Pedro 90+2'	Report	Namaso (yellow card) 15'; Aghehowa (yellow card) 30'; Pérez (yellow card) 39'; Djaló (yellow card) 45+1'; Eustáquio 66'; Gül (yellow card) 81'; Pepê (yellow card) 90+4'	Stadium: Stadio Olimpico; Attendance: 29,576; Referee: Georgi Kabakov (Bulgaria)

28 November 2024 5	Lazio (Italy)	0–0	(Bulgaria) Ludogorets Razgrad	Rome, Italy
18:45 CET (UTC+1)	Pellegrini (yellow card) 28'; Tchaouna (yellow card) 42'; Gigot (yellow card) 60'; Rovella (yellow card) 73'; Patric (yellow card) 73'; Isaksen (yellow card) 84'	Report	Kurtulus (yellow card) 36'; Naressi (yellow card) 81'	Stadium: Stadio Olimpico; Attendance: 27,259; Referee: Duje Strukan (Croatia)

12 December 2024 6	Ajax (Netherlands)	1–3	(Italy) Lazio	Amsterdam, Netherlands
21:00 CET (UTC+1)	Hato (yellow card) 38'; Brobbey (yellow card) 45+1'; Traoré 47'; Weghorst (yellow card) 82'	Report	Tchaouna 12'; Rovella (yellow card) 45+2'; Pellegrini (yellow card) 46'; Dele-Bashiru 52'; Pedro 77'; Gigot (yellow card) 82'	Stadium: Johan Cruyff Arena; Attendance: 50,127; Referee: Ivan Kružliak (Slovakia)

23 January 2025 7	Lazio (Italy)	3–1	(Spain) Real Sociedad	Rome, Italy
21:00 CET (UTC+1)	Gila 5'; Rovella (yellow card) 7'; Zaccagni 32', (yellow card) 53'; Castellanos 34'	Report	Muñoz (yellow card) 12' (yellow-red card) 30'; Zubimendi (yellow card) 39'; Barrenetxea 82'	Stadium: Stadio Olimpico; Attendance: 32,635; Referee: Lawrence Visser (Belgium)

30 January 2025 8	Braga (Portugal)	1–0	(Italy) Lazio	Braga, Portugal
21:00 WET (UTC±0)	R. Horta 6'	Report	Gila (yellow card) 69'	Stadium: Estádio Municipal; Attendance: 10,438; Referee: John Brooks (England)

==== Knockout phase ====
===== Round of 16 =====
The draw for the round of 16 was held on 21 February 2025.

6 March 2025 First leg	Viktoria Plzeň (Czech Republic)	1–2	(Italy) Lazio	Plzeň, Czech Republic
21:00 CET (UTC+1)	Durosinmi 53'; Kalvach (yellow card) 61'; Cadu (yellow card) 71'; Červ (yellow card) 75'	Report	Romagnoli 18'; Vecino (yellow card) 63'; Rovella (red card) 77'; Patric (yellow card) 83'; Gigot (red card) 90+3'; Isaksen 90+8'	Stadium: Doosan Arena; Attendance: 11,236; Referee: Donatas Rumšas (Lithuania)

13 March 2025 Second leg	Lazio (Italy)	1–1 (3–2 agg.)	(Czech Republic) Viktoria Plzeň	Rome, Italy
18:45 CET (UTC+1)	Marušić (yellow card) 4'; Vecino (yellow card) 69'; Romagnoli 77'	Report	Dweh (yellow card) 1'; Durosinmi (yellow card) 40'; Šulc 52'	Stadium: Stadio Olimpico; Attendance: 39,547; Referee: Danny Makkelie (Netherlands)

===== Quarter-finals =====
The draw for the order of the quarter-final legs was held on 21 February 2025, after the draw for the round of 16.

10 April 2025 First leg	Bodø/Glimt (Norway)	2–0	(Italy) Lazio	Bodø, Norway
18:45 CEST (UTC+2)	Saltnes 47', 69'	Report	Zaccagni (yellow card) 34'; Castellanos (yellow card) 73'; Romagnoli (yellow card) 90+2'	Stadium: Aspmyra Stadion; Attendance: 8,124; Referee: Michael Oliver (England)

17 April 2025 Second leg	Lazio (Italy)	3–1 (a.e.t.) (3–3 agg.) (2–3 p)	(Norway) Bodø/Glimt	Rome, Italy
21:00 CEST (UTC+2)	Castellanos 21'; Rovella (yellow card) 22'; Noslin 90+3'; Dia 100', (yellow card) 107'; Lazzari (yellow card) 104'	Report	Høgh (yellow card) 35'; Evjen (yellow card) 63'; Helmersen (yellow card) 77' (yellow-red card) 120', (goal) 109'; Berg (yellow card) 80'; Sjøvold (yellow card) 102'	Stadium: Stadio Olimpico; Attendance: 54,873; Referee: Daniel Siebert (Germany)
	Penalties
	Dia (penalty scored); Tchaouna (penalty missed); Noslin (penalty missed); Guendouzi (penalty scored); Castellanos (penalty missed)		(penalty missed) Hauge; (penalty scored) Fet; (penalty scored) Sørli; (penalty scored) Moe; (penalty missed) Berg

== Statistics ==
=== Appearances and goals ===
No.	Pos	Nat	Player	Total		Serie A		Coppa Italia		Europa League	
No.	Pos	Nat	Player	Apps	Goals	Apps	Goals	Apps	Goals	Apps	Goals
Goalkeepers
35	GK	(Greece) GRE	Christos Mandas	20	0	9	0	2	0	9	0
55	GK	(Italy) ITA	Alessio Furlanetto	0	0	0	0	0	0	0	0
94	GK	(Italy) ITA	Ivan Provedel	32	0	29	0	0	0	3	0
Defenders
2	DF	(France) FRA	Samuel Gigot	23	2	7+8	2	2	0	6	0
3	DF	(Italy) ITA	Luca Pellegrini	29	0	9+12	0	1	0	6+1	0
4	DF	(Spain) ESP	Patric	18	1	5+5	1	1	0	5+2	0
13	DF	(Italy) ITA	Alessio Romagnoli	42	5	30+1	2	1	0	9+1	3
23	DF	(Albania) ALB	Elseid Hysaj	14	0	4+7	0	1	0	1+1	0
25	DF	(Denmark) DEN	Oliver Provstgaard	2	0	0+2	0	0	0	0	0
30	DF	(Portugal) POR	Nuno Tavares	30	0	22+1	0	0+1	0	4+2	0
34	DF	(Spain) ESP	Mario Gila	42	2	30+1	1	0+1	0	5+5	1
63	DF	(Italy) ITA	Matteo Zazza	1	0	0	0	0	0	0+1	0
77	DF	(Montenegro) MNE	Adam Marušić	47	4	25+9	4	0+1	0	11+1	0
Midfielders
5	MF	(Uruguay) URU	Matías Vecino	28	1	7+12	1	0	0	7+2	0
6	MF	(Italy) ITA	Nicolò Rovella	43	0	30+2	0	2	0	5+4	0
7	MF	(Nigeria) NGR	Fisayo Dele-Bashiru	29	5	12+8	3	1	0	5+3	2
8	MF	(France) FRA	Mattéo Guendouzi	47	1	36	1	1+1	0	8+1	0
10	MF	(Italy) ITA	Mattia Zaccagni	45	10	32+1	8	2	0	6+4	2
21	MF	(Morocco) MAR	Reda Belahyane	6	0	1+5	0	0	0	0	0
26	MF	(Croatia) CRO	Toma Bašić	0	0	0	0	0	0	0	0
28	MF	(Italy) ITA	André Anderson	0	0	0	0	0	0	0	0
29	MF	(Italy) ITA	Manuel Lazzari	34	0	16+9	0	2	0	2+5	0
Forwards
9	FW	(Spain) ESP	Pedro	43	14	6+23	10	1+1	0	11+1	4
11	FW	(Argentina) ARG	Valentín Castellanos	39	14	27+1	10	0	0	7+4	4
14	FW	(Netherlands) NED	Tijjani Noslin	38	6	8+21	2	1+1	3	3+4	1
18	FW	(Denmark) DEN	Gustav Isaksen	48	6	28+8	4	1+1	0	5+5	2
19	FW	(Senegal) SEN	Boulaye Dia	47	12	26+8	9	1	0	7+5	3
20	FW	(France) FRA	Loum Tchaouna	36	2	6+17	1	2	0	7+4	1
27	FW	(Germany) GER	Arijon Ibrahimović	2	0	0+1	0	0+1	0	0	0
64	FW	(Spain) ESP	Mahamadou Baldé	2	0	0	0	0	0	0+2	0
Players loaned out during the season
15	DF	(Italy) ITA	Nicolò Casale	2	0	2	0	0	0	0	0
22	MF	(Italy) ITA	Gaetano Castrovilli	10	0	1+8	0	0+1	0	0	0
92	MF	(Ivory Coast) CIV	Jean-Daniel Akpa Akpro	0	0	0	0	0	0	0	0

Source: Competitions
