= Nicolò Casale =

Italian footballer (born 1998)

Personal information
- Date of birth: 14 February 1998 (age 28)
- Place of birth: Negrar, Italy
- Height: 1.91 m (6 ft 3 in)
- Position: Centre-back

Team information
- Current team: Bologna
- Number: 15

Youth career
- Pescantina Settimo
- –2017: Hellas Verona

Senior career*
Years	Team	Apps	(Gls)
2017–2022	Hellas Verona	36	(0)
2017–2018	→ Perugia (loan)	1	(0)
2018	→ Prato (loan)	15	(0)
2018–2019	→ Südtirol (loan)	34	(0)
2019–2020	→ Venezia (loan)	20	(0)
2020–2021	→ Empoli (loan)	24	(1)
2022–2025	Lazio	51	(1)
2024–2025	→ Bologna (loan)	15	(0)
2025–	Bologna	15	(1)

International career
2016–2017	Italy U19	2	(0)
2020	Italy U21	2	(0)
- * Club domestic league appearances and goals as of 14:57, 24 October 2026 (UTC)

Nicolò Casale (born 14 February 1998) is an Italian professional footballer who plays as a centre-back for Serie A club Bologna.

== Club career ==
Casale made his Serie B debut for Perugia on 16 September 2017 in a game against Parma.

On 18 July 2019, Casale joined Venezia on loan with an option to buy.

On 3 October 2020, Casale went to Empoli on loan.

On 8 July 2022, Lazio announced the signing of Casale on a permanent deal. On 30 August 2024, Casale moved to Bologna on loan, with an option to buy and a conditional obligation to buy.

On 20 May 2025, Bologna made the transfer permanent and signed a three-year contract with Casale.

== International career ==
Casale made his debut with the Italy under-21 national team on 3 September 2020, starting in a 2–1 friendly win over Slovenia.

In September 2023, he received his first call-up to the Italy senior national team by newly-appointed head coach Luciano Spalletti, for two UEFA Euro 2024 qualifying matches against North Macedonia and Ukraine.

== Career statistics ==
As of match played 24 October 2026

Appearances and goals by club, season and competition
Club	Season	League			Cup		Europe		Other		Total	
Club	Season	Division	Apps	Goals	Apps	Goals	Apps	Goals	Apps	Goals	Apps	Goals
Perugia (loan)	2017–18	Serie B	1	0	1	0	—		—		2	0
Prato (loan)	2017–18	Serie C	15	0	—		—		—		15	0
Südtirol (loan)	2018–19	Serie C	34	0	4	0	—		—		38	0
Venezia (loan)	2019–20	Serie B	20	0	0	0	—		—		20	0
Empoli (loan)	2020–21	Serie B	24	1	2	0	—		—		26	1
Hellas Verona	2021–22	Serie A	36	0	1	0	—		—		37	1
Lazio	2022–23	Serie A	29	1	2	0	6 (Note: Two appearances in UEFA Europa League, four appearances in UEFA Europa Conference League)	0	—		37	1
Lazio	2023–24	Serie A	20	0	2	0	2 (Note: Appearances in UEFA Champions League)	0	0	0	24	0
Lazio	2024–25	Serie A	2	0	—		—		—		2	0
Lazio	Total		51	1	4	0	8	0	0	0	63	1
Bologna (loan)	2024–25	Serie A	15	0	3	0	4	0	—		22	0
Bologna	2025–26	Serie A	12	0	0	0	6 (Note: Appearances in UEFA Europa League)	0	—		18	0
Bologna	2026–27	Serie A	3	1	0	0	—		—		3	1
Bologna	Total		15	1	0	0	6	0	—		21	1
Career total			211	3	15	0	18	0	0	0	244	3

== Honours ==
Empoli

- Serie B: 2020–21

Bologna

- Coppa Italia: 2024–25
