= Christos Mandas =

Greek footballer (born 2001)

- Mandas in 2026

Personal information
- Date of birth: 17 September 2001 (age 25)
- Place of birth: Piraeus, Greece
- Height: 1.89 m (6 ft 2 in)
- Position: Goalkeeper

Team information
- Current team: Lazio
- Number: 35

Youth career
- –2013: Aetos Korydallos
- 2013–2019: Atromitos

Senior career*
Years	Team	Apps	(Gls)
2017–2022	Atromitos	28	(0)
2022–2023	OFI	29	(0)
2023–	Lazio	27	(0)
2026	→ Bournemouth (loan)	0	(0)

International career^{‡}
2017	Greece U16	3	(0)
2017–2018	Greece U17	9	(0)
2018–2019	Greece U18	5	(0)
2018–2019	Greece U19	6	(0)
2021	Greece U21	2	(0)
2024–	Greece	3	(0)
- * Club domestic league appearances and goals as of 27 October 2026 ‡ National team caps and goals as of 4 June 2026

Christos Mandas (Greek: Χρήστος Μανδάς; born 17 September 2001) is a Greek professional footballer who plays as a goalkeeper for Serie A club Lazio and the Greece national team.

== Club career ==
=== Atromitos ===
On 28 November 2017, Mandas made his professional debut in Greek Cup against Sparta. On 30 September 2019, he signed a contract extension until the summer of 2022, with a buy-out clause of €2,000,000.

=== OFI ===
On 31 January 2022, OFI officially announced the signing of Mandas until the summer of 2026.

=== Lazio ===
On 1 September 2023, Mandas officially joined Serie A club Lazio for an undisclosed fee. On 11 March 2025, he signed a contract extension until the summer of 2029.

=== Bournemouth ===
On 27 January 2026, Mandas signed with Premier League club Bournemouth on loan until the end of the season.

=== Lazio ===
In the summer of 2026, Mandas returned to Lazio. After impressive performances at the start of 2026–27 season, he established himself as the club's first-choice goalkeeper.

== International career ==
Mandas made his debut for the Greece national football team on 11 June 2024 in a friendly against Malta in Grödig, Austria. He replaced Konstantinos Tzolakis in the 82nd minute of Greece's 2–0 victory.

== Career statistics ==
=== Club ===
As of match played 16 August 2026

Appearances and goals by club, season and competition
Club	Season	League			National cup (Note: Includes Greek Cup, Coppa Italia)		Europe		Other		Total	
Club	Season	Division	Apps	Goals	Apps	Goals	Apps	Goals	Apps	Goals	Apps	Goals
Atromitos	2017–18	Super League Greece	1	0	1	0	—		—		2	0
Atromitos	2018–19	Super League Greece	1	0	1	0	0	0	—		2	0
Atromitos	2019–20	Super League Greece	12	0	1	0	0	0	—		13	0
Atromitos	2020–21	Super League Greece	14	0	2	0	—		—		16	0
Atromitos	2021–22	Super League Greece	0	0	0	0	—		—		0	0
Atromitos	Total		28	0	5	0	0	0	—		33	0
OFI	2021–22	Super League Greece	1	0	0	0	—		—		1	0
OFI	2022–23	Super League Greece	26	0	0	0	—		—		26	0
OFI	2023–24	Super League Greece	2	0	0	0	—		—		2	0
OFI	Total		29	0	0	0	—		—		29	0
Lazio	2023–24	Serie A	9	0	3	0	0	0	0	0	12	0
Lazio	2024–25	Serie A	9	0	2	0	9 (Note: Appearances in UEFA Europa League)	0	—		20	0
Lazio	2025–26	Serie A	0	0	1	0	—		—		1	0
Lazio	2026–27	Serie A	9	0	1	0	—		0	0	10	0
Lazio	Total		27	0	7	0	9	0	0	0	43	0
Bournemouth (loan)	2025–26	Premier League	0	0	—		—		—		0	0
Career total			74	0	12	0	9	0	0	0	95	0

=== International ===
As of match played 4 June 2026

Appearances and goals by national team and year
National team	Year	Apps	Goals
Greece	2024	1	0
Greece	2025	1	0
Greece	2026	1	0
Total		3	0
