= Nicolò Rovella =

Italian footballer (born 2001)

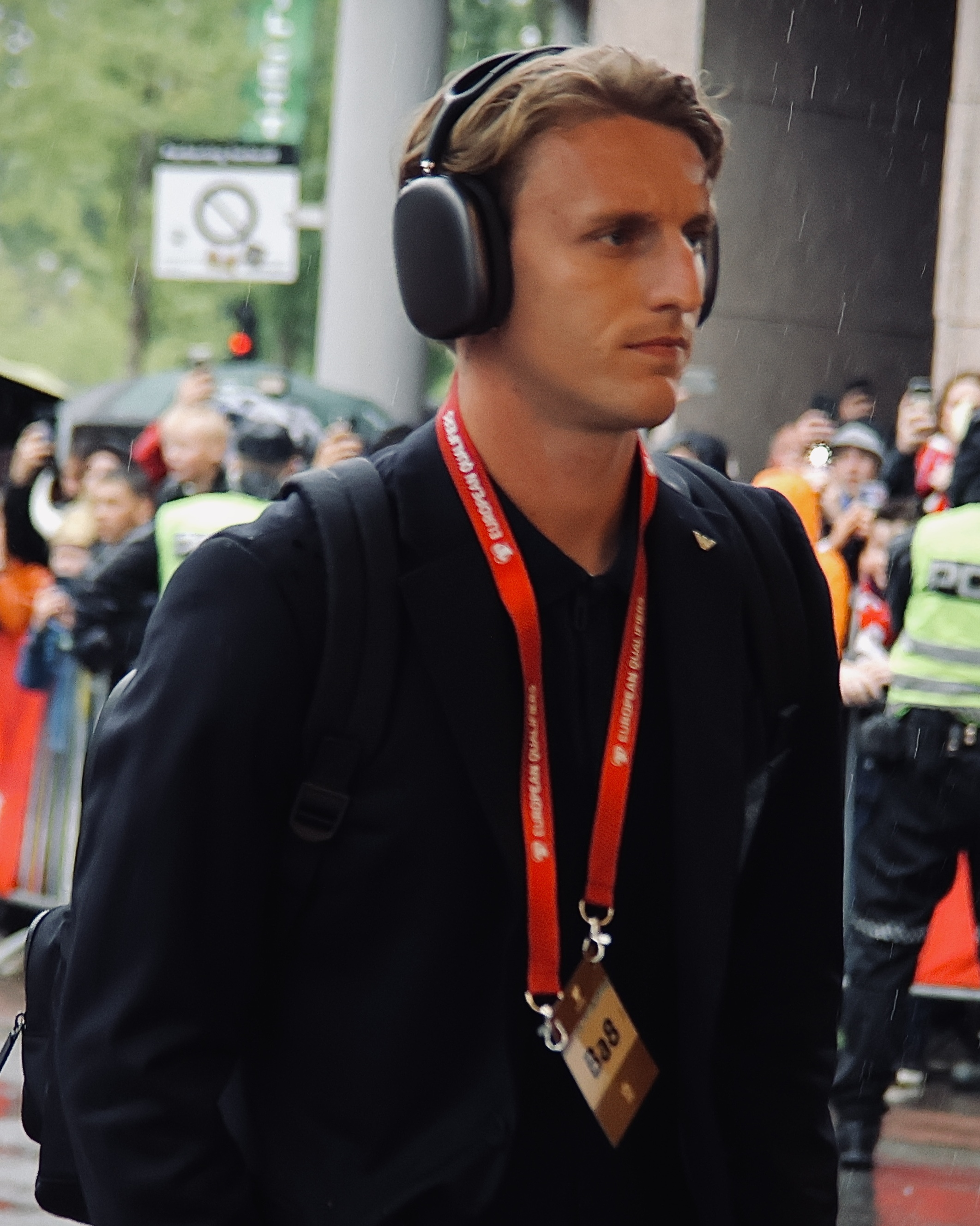
- Rovella with Italy in 2025

Personal information
- Date of birth: 4 December 2001 (age 24)
- Place of birth: Segrate, Italy
- Height: 1.79 m (5 ft 10 in)
- Position: Midfielder

Team information
- Current team: Lazio
- Number: 6

Youth career
- 2005–2014: Accademia Inter
- 2014–2017: Alcione
- 2017–2020: Genoa

Senior career*
Years	Team	Apps	(Gls)
2019–2021	Genoa	11	(0)
2021–2025	Juventus	3	(0)
2021–2022	→ Genoa (loan)	32	(0)
2022–2023	→ Monza (loan)	25	(1)
2023–2025	→ Lazio (loan)	56	(0)
2025–	Lazio	11	(0)

International career^{‡}
2018	Italy U17	6	(0)
2018–2019	Italy U18	9	(0)
2019–2020	Italy U19	10	(0)
2020–2023	Italy U21	21	(3)
2024–	Italy	4	(0)
Medal record
Representing Italy
UEFA European Under-17 Championship
Runner-up	2018 England
- * Club domestic league appearances and goals as of 17 May 2026 ‡ National team caps and goals as of 6 June 2025

Nicolò Rovella (born 4 December 2001) is an Italian professional footballer who plays as a defensive midfielder for Serie A club Lazio and the Italy national team.

== Club career ==
=== Early career and Genoa ===
Rovella started playing football at Accademia Inter (an affiliate of Inter Milan), where he won a Gothia Cup, before moving to Alcione in 2014. In summer 2017, Rovella joined Genoa, where he immediately won the Carlin's Boys youth tournament.

Coming through the youth ranks of the club, Rovella made his professional debut with Genoa on 3 December 2019, replacing Francesco Cassata in the final minutes of a 3–2 Coppa Italia victory against Ascoli. He made his Serie A debut on 21 December 2019, aged 18, as a substitute for Filip Jagiełło in a 4–0 away defeat against Inter Milan. On 25 July 2020, Rovella made his first start for Genoa in a 3–0 home defeat against Inter.

Rovella gained more playing time and started during the 2020–21 season, establishing himself in Genoa's central midfield as he helped the Rossoblù stay in the Serie A.

=== Later career ===
On 29 January 2021, Juventus announced the signing of Rovella on a three-and-a-half-year contract for €18 million, plus a maximum of €20 million in performance-related bonuses. He remained in Genoa on loan until the end of the 2021–22 season, with Manolo Portanova and Elia Petrelli being traded by the club in permanent moves as well. After returning to Juventus from his loan to Genoa, Rovella made his Bianconeri debut on 15 August 2022, replacing Manuel Locatelli in a home victory against Sassuolo in the first matchday of the 2022–23 Serie A.

On 31 August 2022, Rovella joined newly-promoted Serie A club Monza on a-year loan. He made his debut on 5 September, starting in a 2–0 league defeat against Atalanta. On 16 August 2023, Lazio announced the signing of Rovella from Juventus on a two-year loan with a conditional obligation to buy.

== International career ==
=== Youth ===
On 12 November 2020, Rovella debuted for the under-21 team, playing as a starter in a European Championship qualifying match against Iceland in Reykjavík, in which Azzurrini won 2–1. He was subsequently included in the squad that took part in the 2021 European Championship in Slovenia and Hungary. However, Rovella got sent off after receiving a double yellow card in the second group stage match against Spain, as Italy was eventually eliminated from the tournament in the quarter-finals, after a 5–3 loss to Portugal.

Rovella was confirmed in the following cycle of the under-21 national team, as he scored his first goal for the Azzurrini on 29 March 2022, netting the lone goal of a 1–0 victory against Bosnia and Herzegovina in the 2023 UEFA European Under-21 Championship qualification.

=== Senior ===
On 8 November 2024, coach Luciano Spalletti included Rovella in the Italy first team squad for the upcoming UEFA Nations League fixtures against Belgium and France. The same year on 14 November, he debuted in a 1–0 victory against the former opponent by playing 79 minutes.

== Style of play ==
Rovella is a right-footed midfielder, who can play as a mezzala, playmaker, or attacking midfielder. He has been noted for his first touch, his vision, his passing range and tactical awareness. Rovella is also regarded for his elegant style of play and his charisma.

== Career statistics ==
=== Club ===
As of match played 16 August 2026

Appearances and goals by club, season and competition
Club	Season	League			Coppa Italia		Europe		Other		Total	
Club	Season	Division	Apps	Goals	Apps	Goals	Apps	Goals	Apps	Goals	Apps	Goals
Genoa	2019–20	Serie A	2	0	1	0	—		—		3	0
Genoa	2020–21 (Note: Part of this season spent on loan from Juventus)	Serie A	20	0	2	0	—		—		22	0
Genoa	2021–22 (Note: On loan from Juventus)	Serie A	21	0	1	0	—		—		22	0
Genoa	Total		43	0	4	0	—		—		47	0
Juventus	2022–23	Serie A	3	0	—		—		—		3	0
Monza (loan)	2022–23	Serie A	25	1	2	0	—		—		27	1
Lazio (loan)	2023–24	Serie A	23	0	3	0	3 (Note: Appearances in UEFA Champions League)	0	1 (Note: Appearance in Supercoppa Italiana)	0	30	0
Lazio (loan)	2024–25	Serie A	33	0	2	0	9 (Note: Appearances in UEFA Europa League)	0	—		44	0
Lazio	2025–26	Serie A	11	0	2	0	—		—		13	0
Lazio	2026–27	Serie A	0	0	1	0	—		0	0	1	0
Lazio	Lazio total		67	0	8	0	12	0	1	0	88	0
Career total			138	1	14	0	12	0	1	0	165	1

=== International ===
As of match played 6 June 2025

Appearances and goals by national team and year
National team	Year	Apps	Goals
Italy	2024	2	0
Italy	2025	2	0
Total		4	0

== Honours ==
Lazio

- Coppa Italia runner-up: 2025–26

Italy U17

- UEFA European Under-17 Championship runner-up: 2018
