= Luca Pellegrini (footballer, born 1999) =

Italian footballer

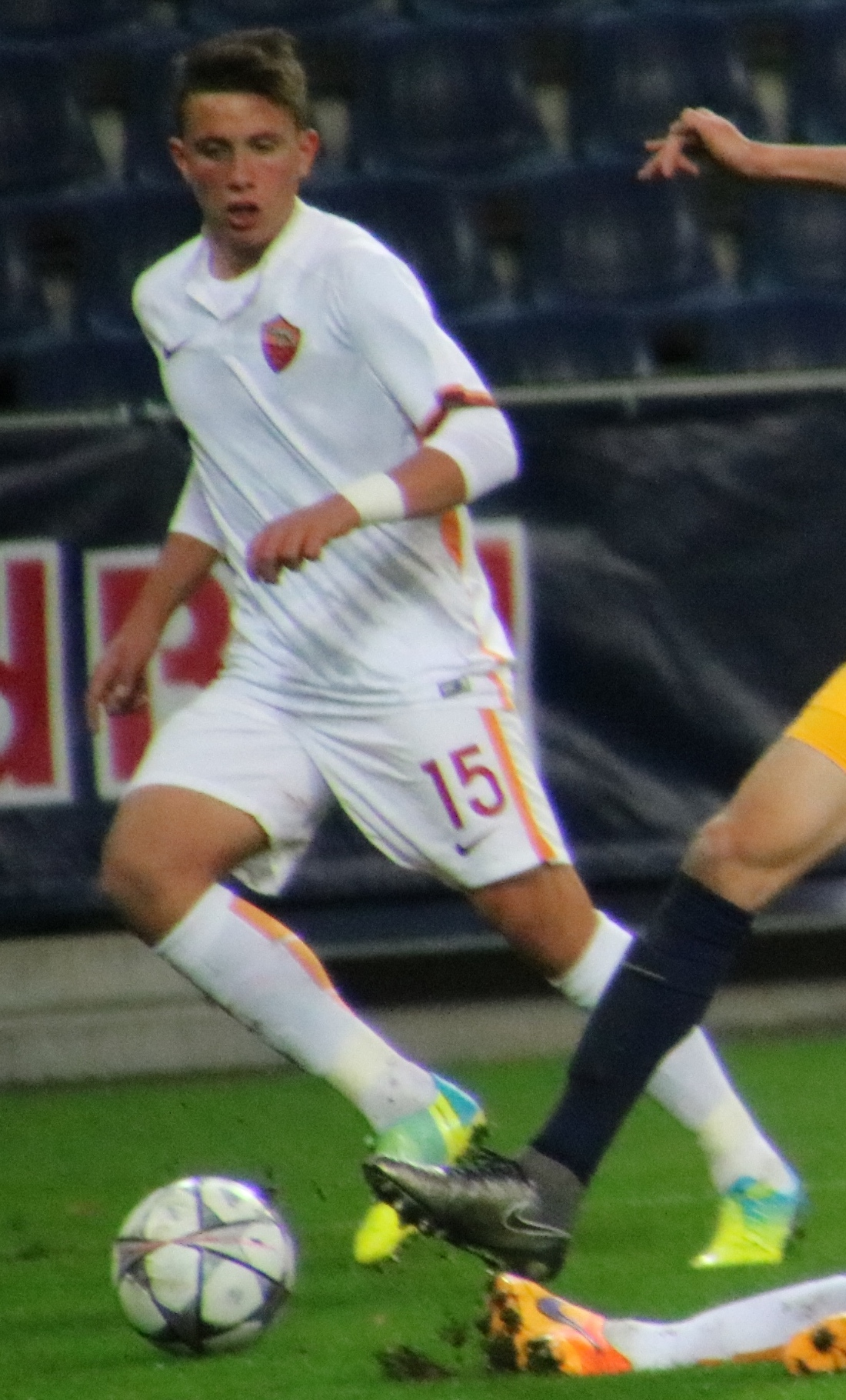
- Pellegrini playing for Roma Primavera in 2016

Personal information
- Full name: Luca Pellegrini
- Date of birth: 7 March 1999 (age 27)
- Place of birth: Rome, Italy
- Height: 1.78 m (5 ft 10 in)
- Positions: Left-back; left wing-back

Team information
- Current team: Lazio
- Number: 3

Youth career
- Cinecittà Bettini
- –2011: Nuova Tor Tre Teste
- 2011–2018: Roma

Senior career*
Years	Team	Apps	(Gls)
2018–2019	Roma	4	(0)
2019	→ Cagliari (loan)	12	(0)
2019–2025	Juventus	18	(0)
2019–2020	→ Cagliari (loan)	24	(0)
2020–2021	→ Genoa (loan)	11	(0)
2022–2023	→ Eintracht Frankfurt (loan)	9	(0)
2023–2025	→ Lazio (loan)	48	(1)
2025–	Lazio	24	(1)

International career^{‡}
2014–2015	Italy U16	16	(0)
2015–2016	Italy U17	12	(0)
2016	Italy U18	3	(0)
2016–2017	Italy U19	3	(0)
2018–2019	Italy U20	7	(0)
2018–2020	Italy U21	5	(0)
2020	Italy	1	(0)
- * Club domestic league appearances and goals as of 23 May 2026 (UTC) ‡ National team caps and goals as of 11 November 2020 (UTC)

Luca Pellegrini (born 7 March 1999) is an Italian professional footballer who plays as a left back or left wing-back for Serie A club Lazio.

== Club career ==
=== Roma ===
On 17 April 2018, Pellegrini signed his first professional contract with Roma, keeping him at the club until 2021.

Pellegrini joined the first team in the 2018–19 season, aged 19. He made his professional and Serie A debut in a 4–0 win over Frosinone on 26 September 2018, making the assist for Aleksandar Kolarov's goal. He made his UEFA Champions League debut on 2 October 2018, in the group stage match won 5–0 against FC Viktoria Plzeň.

==== Loan to Cagliari ====
On 31 January 2019, Pellegrini joined Cagliari on loan until 30 June 2019.

=== Juventus ===
On 30 June 2019, Luca Pellegrini joined Serie A champions Juventus for €22 million, with Leonardo Spinazzola moving in the opposite direction for €29.5 million. On 19 August 2019, he rejoined Cagliari on loan for the 2019–20 season. On 26 September 2020, Pellegrini moved to Genoa on a one-year loan. He moved to Eintracht Frankfurt in the Bundesliga on a one-year loan on 12 August 2022.

=== Lazio ===
On 31 January 2023, Pellegrini was recalled from the Eintracht loan and loaned to Lazio instead, with an option to buy. On 17 August 2023, Pellegrini rejoined Lazio on a two-year loan with the option to make the deal permanent, which became an obligation after certain conditions were met.

== International career ==
Pellegrini made his debut with the Italy U21 team on 11 October 2018, in a friendly match lost 1–0 against Belgium.

With the Italy U20 side he took part in the 2019 FIFA U-20 World Cup, in which Italy achieved a fourth–place finish.

He received his first call up to the Italy senior squad for the team's UEFA Euro 2020 qualifying matches against Armenia and Finland in September 2019.

He made his senior debut with Italy on 11 November 2020, featuring as a substitute in a 4–0 friendly win over Estonia in Florence.

Despite appearing in earlier qualifiers, he was not selected for Italy's 2021 UEFA European Under-21 Championship squad. He was unavailable for selection as he was suffering from a persistent adductor muscle injury beginning in February 2021.

== Style of play ==
Although he usually plays as a left-back, Pellegrini has also been used as an offensive-minded central midfielder, known as the "mezzala" role, in Italian. A physically powerful and technically gifted defender, he is also known for his quality, stamina, consistency, and work-rate. Regarded in the media as a promising young player, in July 2019 he was included in UEFA.com's "50 for the future" list of "ones to watch in 2019–20."

== Career statistics ==
=== Club ===
As of match played 16 August 2026

Appearances and goals by club, season and competition
Club	Season	League			National cup (Note: Includes Coppa Italia, DFB-Pokal)		Europe		Other		Total	
Club	Season	Division	Apps	Goals	Apps	Goals	Apps	Goals	Apps	Goals	Apps	Goals
Roma	2018–19	Serie A	4	0	0	0	2 (Note: Appearance(s) in UEFA Champions League)	0	—		6	0
Cagliari (loan)	2018–19	Serie A	12	0	—		—		—		12	0
Cagliari (loan)	2019–20	Serie A	24	0	0	0	—		—		24	0
Cagliari (loan)	Total		36	0	0	0	—		—		36	0
Genoa (loan)	2020–21	Serie A	11	0	1	0	—		—		12	0
Juventus	2021–22	Serie A	18	0	2	0	1	0	0	0	21	0
Eintracht Frankfurt (loan)	2022–23	Bundesliga	9	0	1	0	4	0	—		14	0
Lazio (loan)	2022–23	Serie A	7	0	0	0	1 (Note: Appearance in UEFA Europa Conference League)	0	—		8	0
Lazio (loan)	2023–24	Serie A	19	1	2	0	4	0	1 (Note: Appearance in Supercoppa Italiana)	0	26	1
Lazio (loan)	2024–25	Serie A	22	0	1	0	7 (Note: Appearances in UEFA Europa League)	0	—		30	0
Lazio	2025–26	Serie A	24	1	2	0	—		—		26	1
Lazio	2026–27	Serie A	0	0	1	0	—		0	0	1	0
Lazio	Lazio total		72	2	6	0	12	0	1	0	91	2
Career total			150	2	10	0	20	0	1	0	181	2

=== International ===
As of match played 11 November 2020

Appearances and goals by national team and year
National team	Year	Apps	Goals
Italy	2020	1	0
Total		1	0

== Honours ==
Juventus

- Coppa Italia runner-up: 2021–22

Lazio

- Coppa Italia runner-up: 2025–26
