= Mattéo Guendouzi =

French footballer (born 1999)

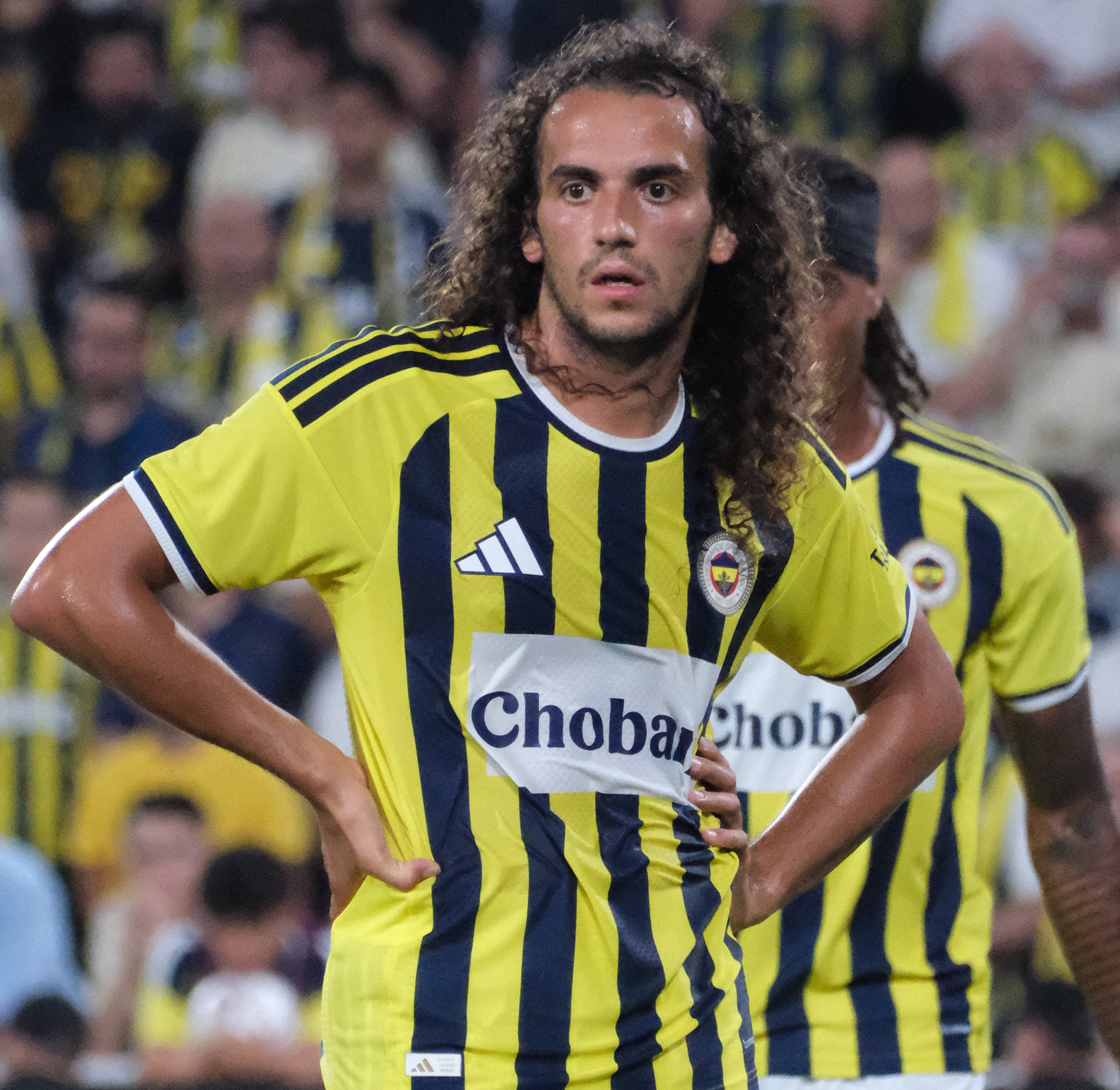
- Guendouzi playing for Fenerbahçe in 2026

Personal information
- Full name: Mattéo Elias Kenzo Guendouzi Olié
- Date of birth: 14 April 1999 (age 27)
- Place of birth: Poissy, France
- Height: 1.85 m (6 ft 1 in)
- Position: Midfielder

Team information
- Current team: Fenerbahçe
- Number: 6

Youth career
- 2005–2014: Paris Saint-Germain
- 2014–2016: Lorient

Senior career*
Years	Team	Apps	(Gls)
2016–2018	Lorient B	24	(0)
2016–2018	Lorient	26	(0)
2018–2022	Arsenal	57	(0)
2020–2021	→ Hertha BSC (loan)	24	(2)
2021–2022	→ Marseille (loan)	38	(4)
2022–2024	Marseille	35	(2)
2023–2024	→ Lazio (loan)	33	(2)
2024–2026	Lazio	53	(3)
2026–	Fenerbahçe	26	(3)

International career^{‡}
2016–2017	France U18	7	(0)
2017	France U19	2	(1)
2017–2018	France U20	3	(1)
2018–2021	France U21	20	(1)
2021–	France	14	(2)
Medal record
Men's football
Representing France
FIFA World Cup
Runner-up	2022 Qatar
UEFA Nations League
Winner	2021 Italy
Third place	2025 Germany
- * Club domestic league appearances and goals as of 8 November 2026 ‡ National team caps and goals as of 8 June 2025

Mattéo Elias Kenzo Guendouzi Olié (French pronunciation: [mateo ɡɛnduzi]; born 14 April 1999) is a French professional footballer who primarily plays as a midfielder for Turkish Süper Lig club Fenerbahçe and the France national team.

Guendouzi began his senior club career at Lorient before joining Arsenal in 2018. After loan spells at Hertha BSC and Marseille, he joined the latter side permamently in 2022, before signing for Lazio in 2024.

A senior French international since 2021, Guendouzi was a member of the France side that finished runners-up at the 2022 FIFA World Cup.

== Club career ==
=== Early career ===
Guendouzi started his career at the academy of Paris Saint-Germain at the age of 6. He left Paris to join Lorient's academy in 2014. After representing the Lorient reserve team, he was promoted to the first team in 2016.

=== Lorient ===
Guendouzi made his debut for Lorient on 15 October 2016, in the Ligue 1 match against Nantes in a 1–2 defeat. He played nine times in all competitions, during his debut season of 2016–17 as Lorient were relegated to the second tier at the end of the season.

In the 2017–18 season, Guendouzi featured 21 times for Lorient as they missed out on promotion, finishing seventh in Ligue 2.

=== Arsenal ===
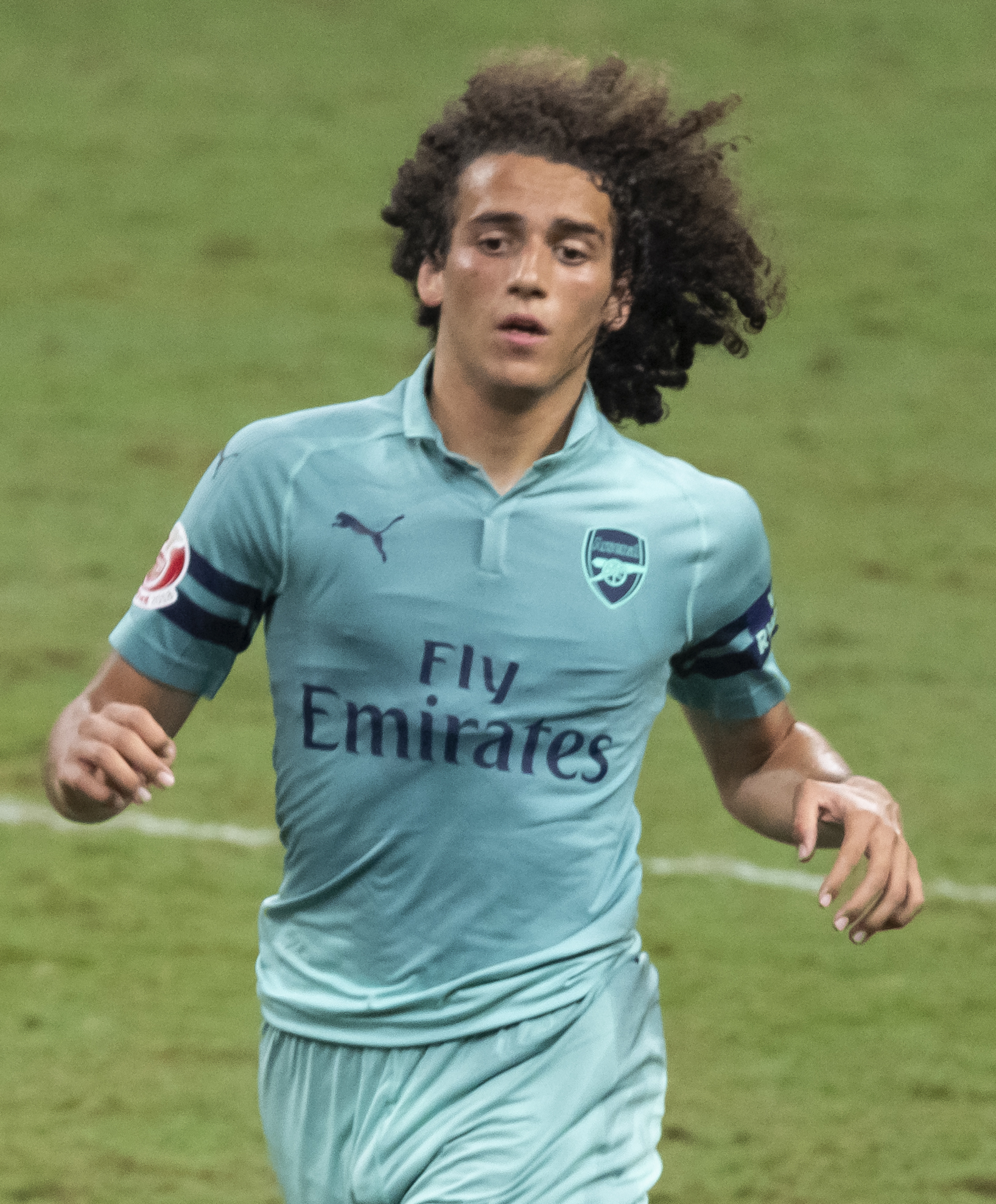
Guendouzi playing for Arsenal in 2018

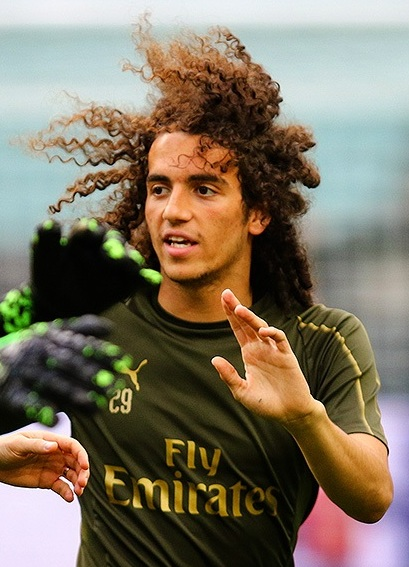
Guendouzi playing for Arsenal in 2019

On 11 July 2018, during the summer transfer window, it was announced that Guendouzi had joined Premier League club Arsenal for an undisclosed fee, believed to be in the region of £7 million, plus bonuses. Head coach Unai Emery said: "He is a talented young player and a lot of clubs were interested in him. He has big potential and gained good first-team experience last season with Lorient. He wants to learn and improve and will be an important part of our first-team squad". On 12 August 2018, Guendouzi made his Premier League debut in Arsenal's opening fixture of the season against defending Champions Manchester City where he made 72 touches, the most for his team. They lost the match 0–2. Guendouzi scored the first professional goal of his career on 4 October 2018, rounding off the scoring in Arsenal's 3–0 away win over Qarabağ, a low drive from just inside the penalty area, after an assist from Alexandre Lacazette. On 29 May 2019, Guendouzi came off the bench in the Europa League final against Chelsea, which Arsenal lost 4–1.

On 20 June 2020, following a post-match altercation with Brighton player Neal Maupay, Guendouzi was excluded from Arsenal training and left out of the club's match-day squads due to a history of issues with his "attitude and general conduct."

==== Loan to Hertha BSC ====
On 5 October 2020, Arsenal announced that Guendouzi would be loaned out to Hertha BSC for the duration of the 2020–21 season. On 1 November 2020, Guendouzi made his debut in a 1–1 draw against VfL Wolfsburg in the Bundesliga. On 12 December 2020, he scored his first goal for the club and in the Bundesliga against Borussia Mönchengladbach, the game ended in a 1–1 draw.

=== Marseille ===
On 6 July 2021, it was announced that Guendouzi was being loaned out to Ligue 1 club Marseille for the 2021–22 Ligue 1 season. The deal included an option-to-buy depending on certain conditions being met. He enjoyed a good start to his Marseille career, quickly gaining the appreciation of fans through both his play, and his personality in standing up for the team - including during a match against Nice, when he protected team-mate Dimitri Payet from fans who rushed onto the pitch, gaining strangle marks on his neck in the process.

On 1 July 2022, it was confirmed that Marseille had activated the option-to-buy clause for a reported £9 million. On 15 August 2023, Guendouzi came off the bench in the 68th minute during the second leg match against Panathinaikos in the Champions League third qualifying round with his team had a 2–0 lead; however, he gave away a penalty in the stoppage time which equaled the tie 2–2, before missing the first penalty in the shootouts which ended in a 3–5 defeat and elimination from the competition.

=== Lazio ===
On 31 August 2023, the deadline day of the summer transfer window, Guendouzi joined Serie A club Lazio on a season-long loan, with the deal including a reported €15 million option-to-buy, plus €3 million in add-ons, which could be turned into a mandatory purchase depending on certain conditions being met.

On 21 April 2024, as per reports from multiple sources, such as Calciomercato.com & TMW, the management at Lazio decided to secure Guendouzi's services from the French club Marseille, after activating his conditional buyout clause. To activate the stated clause, Lazio were to at least required to finish twelfth in the current Serie A table, which the club did so, after successfully triumphing 1–0 over Genoa two days earlier, on 19 April.

=== Fenerbahçe ===
Turkish side Fenerbahçe was heavily linked to Guendouzi during the January 2026 winter transfer window. On 8 January, he signed a contract with Fenerbahçe until the end of 2029–30 season with an option for a further year. The transfer was worth €26m with €2 million in add-ons.

On 10 January, he scored on his debut in the intercontinental derby against Galatasaray in a 2–0 win in the Turkish Super Cup. He also won the man of the match award. On 18 January 2026, he made his Süper Lig debut against Alanyaspor in 3–2 away win.

In the Süper Lig match played against Kasımpaşa on February 23, 2026, after both central defenders, Çağlar Söyüncü and Jayden Oosterwolde were injured and forced out of the game in the first half, he finished the match as a central defender in a three-man formation, despite having started as a midfielder. On 8 March 2026, he scored his first Süper Lig goal for Fenerbahçe against Samsunspor in a 3–2 home win.

== International career ==
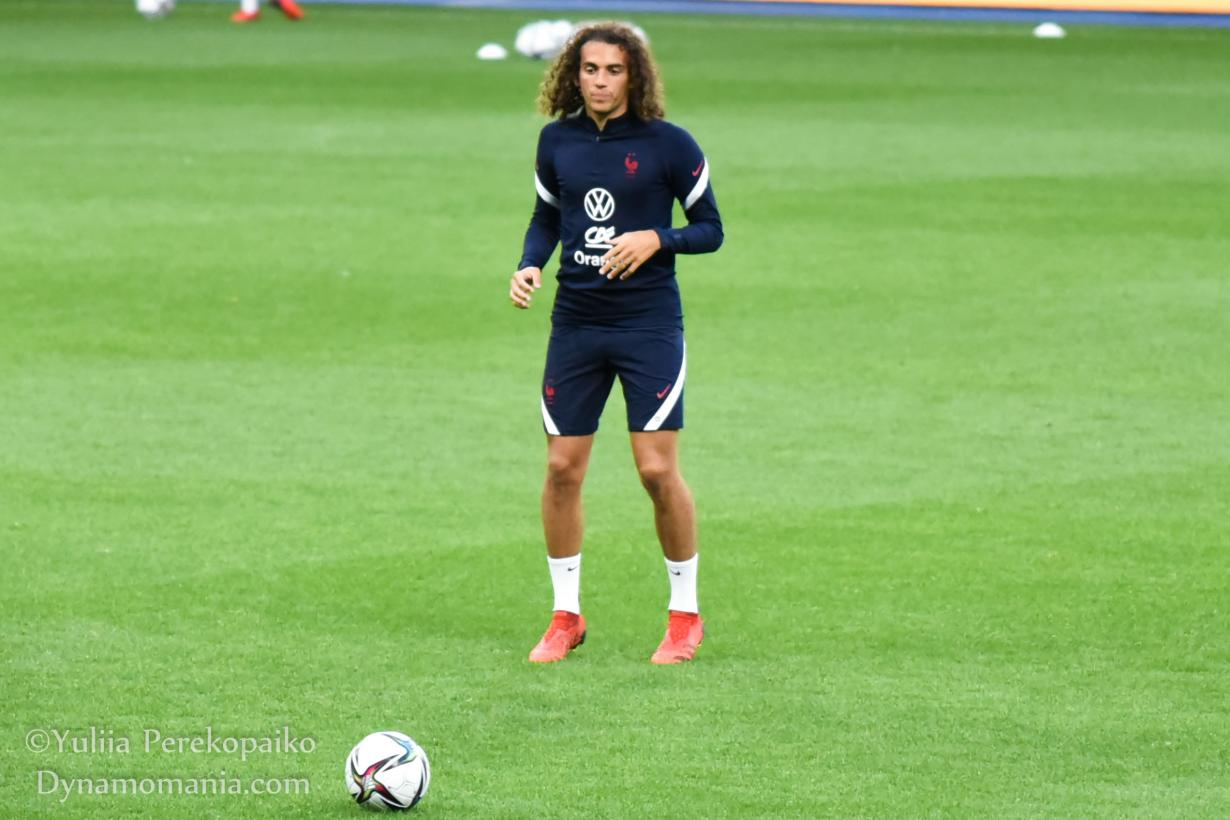
Guendouzi training for France in 2021.

Guendouzi was born in a suburb of Paris, France. He has represented France at levels up to France U20s. With partial Moroccan heritage, Guendouzi was approached by Morocco manager Hervé Renard in 2017 to change allegiances to play for the Morocco national team. However, after Guendouzi's father met Renard in March 2017, Guendouzi decided to remain and pledge allegiance to France.

On 2 September 2019, Guendouzi was called up to the French senior side for the first time to replace the injured Paul Pogba for UEFA Euro 2020 qualifiers against Albania and Andorra. However, he was an unused substitute in both matches. Guendouzi was recalled to the France side on 1 September 2021, to replace the injured Corentin Tolisso for World Cup Qualification matches against Bosnia, Ukraine and Finland. He made his debut on 16 November 2021 in a World Cup qualifier against Finland. On 29 March 2022, he scored his first goal for France in a 5–0 friendly win over South Africa.

== Style of play ==
Sébastien Thierry, one of Guendouzi's coaches at the Paris Saint-Germain academy, recalled that although he was not necessarily the strongest player technically at the age of 14, he possessed very good vision, considerable endurance and a strong mentality. Thierry also described Guendouzi as a leader in PSG's youth teams who was highly determined, assertive and confident in his own ability. On Guendouzi's first call-up to the France senior team, Didier Deschamps described him as a "modern box-to-box midfielder" with a high work rate and technical ability.

Guendouzi's competitiveness has also been a prominent feature of his game. He has described his hatred of losing as an attitude and mentality that contributed to his success as a professional player, while acknowledging that his emotional reactions can result from focusing on the game and playing to win – "not to draw or lose". Emmanuel Petit has described Guendouzi's personality as "volcanic". His competitive temperament has occasionally contributed to disciplinary incidents or confrontations on the pitch.

== Personal life ==
Guendouzi has a French-Moroccan father and French mother. He has a brother called Milan, who is also a footballer and plays for Bourges.

Guendouzi is married to Mae and their first child, a daughter, was born in May 2021.

== Career statistics ==
=== Club ===
As of match played 8 November 2026

Appearances and goals by club, season and competition
Club	Season	League			National cup (Note: Includes Coupe de France, FA Cup, Coppa Italia, Turkish Cup)		League cup (Note: Includes Coupe de la Ligue, EFL Cup)		Europe		Other		Total	
Club	Season	Division	Apps	Goals	Apps	Goals	Apps	Goals	Apps	Goals	Apps	Goals	Apps	Goals
Lorient B	2015–16	CFA	6	0	—		—		—		—		6	0
Lorient B	2016–17	CFA	17	0	—		—		—		—		17	0
Lorient B	2017–18	National 2	1	0	—		—		—		—		1	0
Lorient B	Total		24	0	—		—		—		—		24	0
Lorient	2016–17	Ligue 1	8	0	1	0	0	0	—		—		9	0
Lorient	2017–18	Ligue 2	18	0	1	0	2	0	—		—		21	0
Lorient	Total		26	0	2	0	2	0	—		—		30	0
Arsenal	2018–19	Premier League	33	0	1	0	3	0	11 (Note: Appearances in UEFA Europa League)	1	—		48	1
Arsenal	2019–20	Premier League	24	0	3	0	1	0	6	0	—		34	0
Arsenal	Total		57	0	4	0	4	0	17	1	—		82	1
Hertha BSC (loan)	2020–21	Bundesliga	24	2	0	0	—		—		—		24	2
Marseille (loan)	2021–22	Ligue 1	38	4	4	0	—		14 (Note: Six appearances in UEFA Europa League, eight appearances and one goal in UEFA Europa Conference League)	1	—		56	5
Marseille	2022–23	Ligue 1	33	2	4	1	—		6 (Note: Appearances in UEFA Champions League)	2	—		43	5
Marseille	2023–24	Ligue 1	2	0	—		—		2	0	—		4	0
Marseille	Marseille total		73	6	8	1	—		22	3	—		103	10
Lazio (loan)	2023–24	Serie A	33	2	4	1	—		8	0	1 (Note: Appearance in Supercoppa Italiana)	0	46	3
Lazio	2024–25	Serie A	37	1	2	0	—		9	0	—		48	1
Lazio	2025–26	Serie A	16	2	1	0	—		—		—		17	2
Lazio	Lazio total		86	5	7	1	—		17	0	1	0	111	6
Fenerbahçe	2025–26	Süper Lig	15	1	4	0	—		2	0	1 (Note: Appearance in Turkish Super Cup)	1	22	2
Fenerbahçe	2026–27	Süper Lig	11	2	0	0	—		9	0	0	0	20	2
Fenerbahçe	Total		26	3	4	0	—		11	0	1	1	42	4
Career total			316	16	25	2	6	0	67	4	2	1	416	23

=== International ===
As of match played 8 June 2025

Appearances and goals by national team and year
National team	Year	Apps	Goals
France	2021	1	0
France	2022	6	1
France	2023	0	0
France	2024	5	1
France	2025	2	0
Total		14	2

As of match played 8 June 2025
France score listed first, score column indicates score after each Guendouzi goal.

List of international goals scored by Matteo Guendouzi
No.	Date	Venue	Cap	Opponent	Score	Result	Competition
1	29 March 2022	Stade Pierre-Mauroy, Villeneuve-d'Ascq, France	3	South Africa	5–0	5–0	Friendly
2	10 October 2024	Bozsik Aréna, Budapest, Hungary	10	Israel	3–1	4–1	2024–25 UEFA Nations League A

== Honours ==
Arsenal

- FA Cup: 2019–20
- UEFA Europa League runner-up: 2018–19

Fenerbahçe

- Turkish Super Cup: 2025

France

- UEFA Nations League: 2020–21; third place: 2024–25
- FIFA World Cup runner-up: 2022

Individual

- Turkish Super Cup Man of the Match: 2025
