= Alessio Furlanetto =

Italian footballer (born 2002)

Personal information
- Date of birth: 7 February 2002 (age 24)
- Place of birth: Motta di Livenza, Italy
- Height: 1.91 m (6 ft 3 in)
- Position: Goalkeeper

Team information
- Current team: Lazio
- Number: 55

Youth career
- 2009–2016: ASD Liventina
- 2016–2021: Lazio

Senior career*
Years	Team	Apps	(Gls)
2021–	Lazio	2	(0)
2022–2023	→ Renate (loan)	8	(0)
2023–2024	→ Fermana (loan)	21	(0)
- * Club domestic league appearances and goals as of 23:42, 23 May 2026 (UTC)

Alessio Furlanetto (born 7 February 2002) is an Italian professional footballer who plays as a goalkeeper for Serie A club Lazio.

== Club career ==
A youth product of ASD Liventina, Furlanetto joined the youth academy of Lazio in 2016, and was first called up to the match day squad for the club in 2019 as third goalkeeper. On 15 March 2021, he signed his first professional contract with Lazio. On 4 February 2022, he was named to Lazio's senior squad for the UEFA Europa League. On 18 August 2022, he joined Renate on a year-long loan in Serie C. On 2 September 2023, he joined the club Renate on a year-long loan, again in Serie C. On 30 June 2024, he returned to Lazio and extended his contract until 2028.

== International career ==
Furlanetto was called up to a training camp for the Italy U15s in October 2016. In October 2018, he was called up to the Italy U17s for a friendly tournament.

== Career statistics ==
As of match played 23 May 2026

Appearances and goals by club, season and competition
Club	Season	League			Cup		Europe		Other		Total	
Club	Season	Division	Apps	Goals	Apps	Goals	Apps	Goals	Apps	Goals	Apps	Goals
Lazio	2020–21	Serie A	0	0	0	0	0	0	—		0	0
Lazio	2021–22	Serie A	0	0	0	0	0	0	—		0	0
Lazio	2023–24	Serie A	0	0	—		—		—		0	0
Lazio	2024–25	Serie A	0	0	0	0	0	0	—		0	0
Lazio	2025–26	Serie A	2	0	0	0	—		—		2	0
Lazio	Total		2	0	0	0	0	0	—		2	0
Renate (loan)	2022–23	Serie C	8	0	—		—		2	0	10	0
Fermana (loan)	2023–24	Serie C	21	0	—		—		1	0	22	0
Career total			31	0	0	0	0	0	3	0	34	0
