= Mario Gila =

Spanish footballer (born 2000)

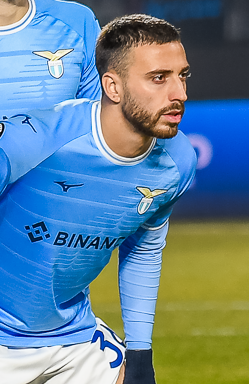
- Gila lining up for Lazio in 2023

Personal information
- Full name: Mario Gila Fuentes
- Date of birth: 29 August 2000 (age 26)
- Place of birth: Barcelona, Spain
- Height: 1.85 m (6 ft 1 in)
- Positions: Centre-back; right-back

Team information
- Current team: AC Milan
- Number: 34

Youth career
- 2009–2013: Santa Perpètua
- 2013–2014: Sabadell
- 2014–2016: Mollet
- 2016–2017: Damm
- 2017–2018: Espanyol
- 2018–2019: Real Madrid

Senior career*
Years	Team	Apps	(Gls)
2019–2022	Real Madrid B	73	(5)
2022	Real Madrid	2	(0)
2022–2026	Lazio	88	(1)
2026–	AC Milan	10	(1)

International career
2022–2023	Spain U21	9	(0)
Medal record
Representing Spain
UEFA European Under-21 Championship
Runner-up	2023 Georgia–Romania	Team
- * Club domestic league appearances and goals as of 22 November 2026

Mario Gila Fuentes (Catalan pronunciation: [ˈʒi.lə]; born 29 August 2000) is a Spanish professional footballer who plays as a centre-back and right-back for Serie A club AC Milan.

== Club career ==
=== Early career ===
Born in Barcelona, Catalonia, Gila is a youth product of various clubs in his native region, including Santa Perpètua, Sabadell, Mollet, Damm and Espanyol. He moved to Real Madrid's youth academy in 2018, signing a contract until 2024. He was promoted to their reserves in 2019 where he became their stalwart and vice captain under Raúl.

=== Real Madrid ===
Gila made his professional debut with the senior Real Madrid squad in a 4–0 La Liga win over Espanyol, coming on as a substitute in the 75th minute.

=== Lazio ===
On 12 July 2022, Serie A club Lazio announced Gila's signing from Real Madrid for €6 million. On 30 October 2022, Gila made his Serie A debut for Lazio in a match against Salernitana, which ended in a 3–1 loss for Lazio.

On 28 November 2023, Gila made his Champions League debut, playing the full match in Lazio's 2–0 group stage victory against Celtic at the Olimpico di Roma.

=== AC Milan ===
On 10 July 2026, he joined fellow Serie A club AC Milan ahead of the 2026–27 season, signing a contract until 2031.

On 18 October 2026 he scored his first goal in a 3-2 win against Atalanta

== International career ==
Gila was called up to a preliminary Spain U19 training camp before the 2019 UEFA European Under-19 Championship.

Gila received his call-up for 2023 UEFA European Under-21 Championship and finished the tournament as runner-up after England defeated Spain by 1-0 in the final.

On 20 March 2025, Gila was called up to the senior Spain squad for the second leg of the quarterfinal round of the Nations League against the Netherlands after Pau Cubarsí's injury in the first leg.

== Career statistics ==
As of match played 22 November 2026

Appearances and goals by club, season and competition
Club	Season	League			National cup (Note: Includes Coppa Italia)		Europe		Other		Total	
Club	Season	Division	Apps	Goals	Apps	Goals	Apps	Goals	Apps	Goals	Apps	Goals
Real Madrid B	2019–20	Segunda División B	21	1	—		—		—		21	1
Real Madrid B	2020–21	Segunda División B	20	2	—		—		—		20	2
Real Madrid B	2021–22	Segunda División RFEF	32	2	—		—		—		32	2
Real Madrid B	Total		73	5	—		—		—		73	5
Real Madrid	2021–22	La Liga	2	0	—		—		—		2	0
Lazio	2022–23	Serie A	4	0	0	0	8 (Note: Five appearances in UEFA Europa League, three appearances in UEFA Europa Conference League)	0	—		12	0
Lazio	2023–24	Serie A	21	0	3	0	4 (Note: Appearances in UEFA Champions League)	0	1 (Note: Appearance in Supercoppa Italiana)	0	29	0
Lazio	2024–25	Serie A	32	1	1	0	10 (Note: Appearances in UEFA Europa League)	1	—		43	2
Lazio	2025–26	Serie A	31	0	5	0	—		—		36	0
Lazio	Total		88	1	9	0	22	1	1	0	120	2
AC Milan	2026–27	Serie A	10	1	0	0	2	0	—		12	1
Career total			173	7	9	0	24	1	1	0	207	8

== Honours ==
Real Madrid

- La Liga: 2021–22

Lazio

- Coppa Italia runner-up: 2025–26

Spain U21

- UEFA European Under-21 Championship runner-up: 2023

Individual

- The Athletic Serie A Team of the Season: 2024–25
