= Diego González (footballer, born 2003) =

Paraguayan footballer

Personal information
- Full name: Diego Luis González Alcaraz
- Date of birth: 7 January 2003 (age 23)
- Place of birth: Alto Paraná, Paraguay
- Height: 1.77 m (5 ft 10 in)
- Position: Forward

Team information
- Current team: Santos Laguna
- Number: 7

Youth career
- EdF Acosta Ñu
- Colonos Unidos
- Oleariense
- Olimpia
- Nacional
- –2020: Libertad
- 2020–2021: Potros del Este

Senior career*
Years	Team	Apps	(Gls)
2017	Colonos Unidos		
2021–2022	Potros del Este	13	(3)
2021	→ USMP (loan)	3	(0)
2022–2023	Celaya	33	(5)
2023	→ Lazio (loan)	0	(0)
2023–2025	Lazio	0	(0)
2025	→ Atlas (loan)	32	(6)
2026	Atlas	10	(1)
2026–	Santos Laguna	0	(0)

International career^{‡}
2022–2023	Paraguay U20	11	(4)
2025–	Paraguay	2	(0)
- * Club domestic league appearances and goals as of 7 November 2025 ‡ National team caps and goals as of 18 November 2025

Diego Luis González Alcaraz (born 7 January 2003) is a Paraguayan professional footballer who plays as a forward for Liga MX club Santos Laguna, and the Paraguay national team.

== Club career ==
González took an interest in football from the age of five, and joined Escuela de Fútbol Acosta Ñu as a child. He joined amateur side Colonos Unidos, going on to make his senior debut with the side at the age of fourteen. He also represented youth side Oleariense, before trialling and signing with professional side Olimpia in November 2017.

In July 2021, González signed for Peruvian side USMP on loan.

On 31 January 2023, González joined Serie A side Lazio on an initial six-month loan, with an option to buy set to turn into an obligation depending on performance. The purchase obligation was activated during the 2022–23 season.

On 30 December 2024, González moved on loan to Atlas for a year.

On 14 May 2026, González signed with Santos Laguna.

== International career ==
González has represented Paraguay at youth international level.

== Career statistics ==
=== Club ===
As of 7 November 2025

Appearances and goals by club, season and competition
Club	Season	League			Cup		Other		Total	
Club	Season	Division	Apps	Goals	Apps	Goals	Apps	Goals	Apps	Goals
Potros del Este	2021	LPF	13	3	0	0	0	0	13	3
USMP (loan)	2021	Liga 1	3	0	0	0	0	0	3	0
Celaya	2021–22	Liga de Expansión MX	13	1	0	0	0	0	13	1
Celaya	2022–23	Liga de Expansión MX	20	4	0	0	0	0	20	4
Celaya	Total		33	5	0	0	0	0	33	5
Lazio (loan)	2022–23	Serie A	0	0	0	0	0	0	0	0
Lazio	2023–24	Serie A	0	0	0	0	0	0	0	0
Atlas (loan)	2024–25	Liga MX	15	1	—		—		15	1
Atlas (loan)	2025–26	Liga MX	17	5	—		2 (Note: Appearances in Leagues Cup)	1	19	6
Atlas (loan)	Total		32	6	—		2	1	34	7
Career total			81	14	0	0	2	1	83	15

=== International ===
As of match played 18 November 2025

Appearances and goals by national team and year
National team	Year	Apps	Goals
Paraguay	2025	2	0
Total		2	0
