= Saná Fernandes =

Bissau-Guinean footballer (born 2006)

Personal information
- Full name: Saná Eusébio Mango Fernandes
- Date of birth: 10 March 2006 (age 20)
- Place of birth: Bissau, Guinea-Bissau
- Height: 1.65 m (5 ft 5 in)
- Position: Left winger

Team information
- Current team: Juve Stabia (on loan from Lazio)
- Number: 77

Youth career
- 2018–2022: Sporting CP
- 2022–: Lazio

Senior career*
Years	Team	Apps	(Gls)
2023–	Lazio	0	(0)
2024–2025	→ NAC Breda (loan)	15	(1)
2026–	→ Juve Stabia (loan)	1	(0)
- * Club domestic league appearances and goals as of 23 August 2026

Saná Eusébio Mango Fernandes (born 10 March 2006) is a Bissau-Guinean professional footballer who plays as a left winger for Serie B club Juve Stabia, on loan from Lazio.

== Early life ==
Fernandes joined the youth academy of Portuguese side Sporting at the age of twelve.

== Career ==
Fernandes started his career with Italian side Lazio.

On 7 August 2024, Fernandes was loaned to NAC Breda in the Netherlands.

== Style of play ==
Fernandes mainly operates as a winger and has been described as "adds good finishing to the dribble with both feet which allows him to accelerate and tear down the flank... when he accelerates, it is difficult to keep up with him".

== Personal life ==
Fernandes is the brother of Portuguese footballer Joelson Fernandes.
