= Diogo (name) =

Diogo is a Portuguese masculine given name and surname.

== People with the first name ==
=== Artists and entertainers ===
- Diogo Amaral (born 1981), Portuguese actor
- Diogo de Macedo (1889–1959), Portuguese painter, sculptor, and writer
- Diogo Dias Melgás (1638–1700), Portuguese composer
- Diogo Dória (born 1953), Portuguese actor
- Diogo Infante (born 1967), Portuguese actor
- Diogo Morgado (born 1981), Portuguese actor
- Diogo Nogueira (born 1981), Brazilian singer-songwriter

=== Sportsmen ===
- Diogo Amado (born 1990), Portuguese footballer
- Diogo Andrade (born 1985), Portuguese footballer
- Diogo António Alberto (born 1989), Mozambican footballer
- Diogo Antunes de Oliveira (born 1986), Brazilian footballer
- Diogo Barbosa Mendanha (born 1992), Brazilian footballer
- Diogo Brito (born 1997), Portuguese basketballer
- Diogo Campos Gomes (born 1990), Brazilian footballer
- Diogo Caramelo (born 1992), Portuguese footballer
- Diogo Carreira (born 1978), Portuguese basketball player
- Diogo Carvalho (born 1988), Portuguese swimmer
- Diogo Castro Santos (born 1969), Brazilian racing driver
- Diogo Correa de Oliveira (1984–2021), Brazilian footballer
- Diogo Coutinho (born 1977), Portuguese rugby union player
- Diogo Costa (born 1999), Portuguese footballer
- Diogo da Costa Oliveira (born 1988), Brazilian footballer
- Diogo Dalot (born 1999), Portuguese footballer
- Diogo da Silva Farias (born 1990), Brazilian footballer
- Diogo de Lima Barcelos (born 1985), Brazilian footballer
- Diogo dos Santos Lima (born 1985), Brazilian footballer
- Diogo Douglas Santos Andrade Barbosa (born 1984), Brazilian footballer
- Diogo Fernandes (born 1985), Brazilian footballer
- Diogo Ferreira (born 1989), Australian footballer
- Diogo Figueiras (born 1991), Portuguese footballer
- Diogo Fonseca (born 1984), Portuguese footballer
- Diogo Galvão (born 1982), Brazilian footballer
- Diogo Gama (born 1981), Portuguese rugby union player
- Diogo Gameiro (born 1995), Portuguese basketballer
- Diogo Gaspar (born 1992), Portuguese footballer
- Diogo Gonçalo Baptista Pires (born 1993), Portuguese footballer
- Diogo Jefferson Mendes de Melo (born 1984), Brazilian footballer
- Diogo Jota (1996–2025), Portuguese footballer
- Diogo Lamelas (born 1990), Portuguese footballer
- Diogo Carvalho Pereira Leite (born 1989), Portuguese footballer
- Diogo Filipe Monteiro Pinto Leite (born 1999), Portuguese footballer
- Diogo Lézico da Silva (born 1983), Portuguese footballer
- Diogo Luís Santo (born 1987), Brazilian footballer
- Diogo Malaquías da Silva (born 1988), Brazilian footballer
- Diogo Manuel Gonçalves Coelho (born 1992), Portuguese footballer
- Diogo Mateus (born 1980), Portuguese rugby union player
- Diogo Matos (born 1975), former Portuguese footballer
- Diogo Miguel Alves Luís (born 1980), Portuguese footballer
- Diogo Moniz (born 1993), Portuguese footballer
- Diogo Orlando (born 1983), Brazilian footballer
- Diogo Pinheiro (born 1990), Brazilian footballer
- Diogo Pinto (footballer) (born 1999), Portuguese footballer
- Diogo Pires (Brazilian footballer) (born 1981)
- Diogo Ramos (born 1986), Portuguese footballer
- Diogo Ribeiro (born 2004), Portuguese swimmer
- Diogo Rincón (born 1980), Brazilian footballer
- Diogo Rodrigues Siston (born 1981), Brazilian-Portuguese footballer
- Diogo Rosado (born 1990), Portuguese footballer
- Diogo Salomão (born 1988), Portuguese footballer
- Diogo Santos Rangel (born 1991), Brazilian-born East Timorese footballer
- Diogo Santos (born 1984), Portuguese footballer
- Diogo Sclebin (born 1982), Brazilian Olympic triathlete
- Diogo Silva (footballer, born 1986) (born 1986), Brazilian footballer
- Diogo Silva (taekwondo) (born 1982), Brazilian taekwondo practitioner
- Diogo Silvestre Bittencourt (born 1989), Brazilian footballer
- Diogo Soares Gomes (born 1985), Brazilian footballer
- Diogo Sousa Ribeiro (born 1991), Portuguese footballer
- Diogo Tavares (born 1987), Portuguese footballer
- Diogo Valente (born 1984), Portuguese footballer
- Diogo Viana (born 1990), Portuguese footballer
- Diogo Vila (born 1990), Portuguese footballer
- Diogo Yabe (born 1980), Brazilian swimmer

=== Explorers, settlers, and colonial administrators ===
- Diogo Álvares Correia (aka Caramuru) (1475-1557), Portuguese settler in the colony of Brazil
- Diogo Cão (1452–1486), Portuguese navigator who discovered the Congo River and Angola
- Diogo da Rocha (fl. 1525), Portuguese explorer
- Diogo de Melo (fl. 1565–1568), Captain-major of Portuguese Ceylon
- Diogo de Melo Coutinho (fl. 1552–1572), Captain-major of Portuguese Ceylon
- Diogo de Melo de Castro (fl. 1633–1638), Governor of Portuguese Ceylon
- Diogo de Silves (fl. 1427), Portuguese explorer
- Diogo de Teive (fl. 1451–1474), Portuguese explorer
- Diogo Dias (fl. 1497–1501), Portuguese explorer
- Diogo Fernandes Pereira (fl. 1503–1507), Portuguese navigator and explorer
- Diogo Gomes (1420–1500), Portuguese navigator, explorer and writer
- Diogo Homem (1521–1576), Portuguese cartographer
- Diogo Ribeiro (cartographer) (fl. 1518–1533), Portuguese cartographer and explorer
- Diogo Rodrigues (1490–1577), Portuguese explorer

=== Nobles ===
- Diogo de Azambuja (1432–1518), Portuguese noble
- Diogo Fernandes (count) (fl. 928), count in the Kingdom of León
- Diogo I Nkumbi a Mpudi (fl. 1545–1561), king of Kongo
- Diogo Lopes de Sequeira (1465–1530), Portuguese noble
- Diogo, Constable of Portugal (1425–1443), Portuguese royal prince
- Diogo, Duke of Viseu (1450–1484), Portuguese noble

=== Politicians ===
- Diogo Antônio Feijó (1784–1843), Brazilian regent and Catholic priest
- Diogo de Barcelos Machado Bettencourt (1847–1922), Portuguese politician and judge
- Diogo de Freitas do Amaral (1941–2019), Portuguese politician
- Diogo Pinto (activist) (born 1974), Mozambican Secretary General of the EMI
- Diogo Vasconcelos (1968–2011), Portuguese politician

=== Others ===
- Diogo Abreu (geographer) (born 1947), Portuguese geographer
- Diogo das Chagas (1584–1661), Portuguese Franciscan friar and historian
- Diogo de Arruda (fl. 1490–1531), Portuguese architect
- Diogo de Boitaca (1460–1528), Portuguese architect and engineer
- Diogo de Couto (1542–1616), Portuguese historian
- Diogo de Gouveia (1471–1557), Portuguese theologian and diplomat
- Diogo de Mendonça Corte-Real (1658–1736), Portuguese diplomat and statesman
- Diogo de Teive (humanist) (1514–1569), Portuguese humanist
- Diogo Mónica, Portuguese-American engineer and entrepreneur
- Diogo Ortiz de Villegas (1457–1519), Castilian priest

== People with the surname ==
=== Sportsmen ===
- Carlos Diogo (born 1983), Uruguayan footballer
- Igor Diogo Moreira Araújo (born 1987), Portuguese footballer
- Ivo Diogo (1935–2009), Brazilian footballer
- João Diogo Serpa Meira (born 1987), Portuguese footballer
- João Diogo (born 1988), Portuguese footballer
- Jordão Diogo (born 1985), Portuguese footballer
- Márcio Diogo (born 1985), Brazilian footballer
- Nuno Diogo (born 1981), Portuguese footballer
- Paulo Diogo (born 1975), Swiss footballer
- Víctor Diogo (born 1958), Uruguayan footballer
- Zé Diogo (born 1994), Portuguese footballer

=== Others ===
- José Diogo Quintela, Portuguese comic actor, from the group Gato Fedorento
- Luísa Diogo (1958–2026), Prime Minister of Mozambique from 2004 to 2010

== See also ==
- Diego
- Diogo (disambiguation)
