= Diogo =

Diogo may refer to:

- Diogo (name), a list of people with the given name or surname
  - Diogo Antunes de Oliveira (born 1986), Brazilian footballer
  - Diogo Castro (born 1985), Brazilian futsal and football player
  - Diogo, Constable of Portugal (1425–1443), Portuguese royal prince
  - Diogo da Costa Oliveira (born 1988), Brazilian footballer
  - Diogo, Duke of Viseu (1450–1484), Portuguese noble
  - Diogo Luís Santo (born 1987), Brazilian footballer
  - Diogo (Mozambican footballer) (1989–2023), Mozambican footballer
  - Diogo Pinheiro (born 1990), Brazilian footballer

== Places ==
- Diogo Island, in the Philippines Luzon Volcanic Arc

== See also ==
- Diego (disambiguation)
- James (disambiguation)
- Santiago (disambiguation)
