= 2026–27 SS Lazio season =

Lazio
2026–27 season
- Owner: Claudio Lotito
- President: Claudio Lotito
- Head coach: Gennaro Gattuso
- Stadium: Stadio Olimpico
- Serie A: 1st
- Coppa Italia: First round
- Supercoppa Italiana: Final
- Top goalscorer: League: Davide Frattesi; Gustav Isaksen; Tijjani Noslin (4 each); All: Davide Frattesi; Gustav Isaksen; Tijjani Noslin (4 each)
- Highest home attendance: 11,500 vs Monza; 11 October 2026 (Serie A)
- Lowest home attendance: 6,058 vs Genoa; 30 August 2026 (Serie A)
- Average home league attendance: 10,141
- Biggest win: 6–2 vs Sassuolo (A); 27 October 2026 (Serie A)
- Biggest defeat: 0–2 vs Mantova (H); 16 August 2026 (Coppa Italia)
Home colours	Away colours	Third colours

The 2026–27 season is the 127th season in the history of SS Lazio, and the club's 39th consecutive season in Serie A. In addition to the domestic league, the club is participating in the Coppa Italia and the Supercoppa Italiana.

== First-team squad ==
As of 8 September 2026

No.	Player	Nationality	Position	Date of birth (age)	Signed from	Signed in	Contract ends (Note: Contracts end on 30 June)
Goalkeepers
35	Christos Mandas	(Greece)	GK	17 September 2001 (age 25)	(Greece) OFI	2023	2029
40	Edoardo Motta	(Italy)	GK	13 January 2005 (age 21)	Reggiana	2026	2030
55	Alessio Furlanetto	(Italy)	GK	7 February 2002 (age 24)	Academy	2022	2028
59	Davide Renzetti	(Italy)	GK	9 June 2006 (age 20)	Academy	2024	2027
Defenders
2	Diogo Leite	(Portugal)	CB	23 January 1999 (age 27)	Free agent	2026	2029
3	Luca Pellegrini	(Italy)	LB / LWB	7 March 1999 (age 27)	Juventus	2023	2027
5	Danilho Doekhi	(Netherlands)	CB	30 June 1998 (age 28)	(Germany) Union Berlin	2026	2029
15	Romano Floriani Mussolini	(Italy)	RB / RWB	27 January 2003 (age 23)	Academy	2023	2027
17	Nuno Tavares	(Portugal)	LB / LWB	26 January 2000 (age 26)	(England) Arsenal	2024	2029
23	Alfonso Pedraza	(Spain)	LB	9 April 1996 (age 30)	(Spain) Villarreal	2026	2029
25	Oliver Provstgaard	(Denmark)	CB	4 June 2003 (age 23)	(Denmark) Vejle	2025	2029
29	Manuel Lazzari	(Italy)	RWB / RB / RM	29 November 1993 (age 32)	SPAL	2019	2027
33	Ricardo Bordon	(Brazil)	CB	2 November 2006 (age 20)	Academy	2026	Unknown
37	Josip Šutalo	(Croatia)	CB	28 February 2000 (age 26)	(Netherlands) Ajax (loan)	2026	2027
76	Filipe Bordon	(Brazil)	CB / DM	24 June 2005 (age 21)	Academy	2024	2028
77	Adam Marušić	(Montenegro)	RB / RWB / LB	17 October 1992 (age 34)	(Belgium) Oostende	2017	2028
—	Mohamed Farès	(Algeria)	LB / LWB / LM	15 February 1996 (age 30)	SPAL	2020	2027
Midfielders
6	Nicolò Rovella	(Italy)	DM / CM	4 December 2001 (age 24)	Juventus	2023	2028
7	Fisayo Dele-Bashiru	(Nigeria)	CM / AM	6 February 2001 (age 25)	(Turkey) Hatayspor	2024	2028
8	Bruno Galassi	(Spain)	CM	7 February 2007 (age 19)	(Spain) Real Madrid	2026	2029
16	Davide Frattesi	(Italy)	CM	22 September 1999 (age 27)	Internazionale (loan)	2026	2027
21	Reda Belahyane	(Morocco)	DM / CM	1 June 2004 (age 22)	Hellas Verona	2025	2029
24	Kenneth Taylor	(Netherlands)	CM	16 May 2002 (age 24)	(Netherlands) Ajax	2026	2030
28	Adrian Przyborek	(Poland)	AM / RW	1 January 2007 (age 19)	(Poland) Pogoń Szczecin	2026	2030
32	Danilo Cataldi	(Italy)	DM / CM	6 August 1994 (age 32)	Academy	2013	2027
71	Valerio Farcomeni	(Italy)	CM	18 January 2006 (age 20)	Academy	2026	2030
Forwards
9	Andrea Pinamonti	(Italy)	ST	19 May 1999 (age 27)	Sassuolo	2026	2031
10	Mattia Zaccagni (C)	(Italy)	LW / AM / CM	16 June 1995 (age 31)	Hellas Verona	2021	2029
11	Gustav Isaksen	(Denmark)	RW / LW	19 April 2001 (age 25)	(Denmark) Midtjylland	2023	2028
14	Tijjani Noslin	(Netherlands)	RW / CF / LW	7 July 1999 (age 27)	Hellas Verona	2024	2029
22	Matteo Cancellieri	(Italy)	RW / LW / AM	12 February 2002 (age 24)	Hellas Verona	2022	2027
63	Federico Serra	(Italy)	CF / LW	3 January 2006 (age 20)	Academy	2026	Unknown
80	Albert Guðmundsson	(Iceland)	SS / AM / LW	15 June 1997 (age 29)	Fiorentina (loan)	2026	2027
Out on loan
19	Boulaye Dia	(Senegal)	CF / SS	16 November 1996 (age 30)	Salernitana	2024	2028
20	Petar Ratkov	(Serbia)	CF	18 August 2003 (age 23)	(Austria) Red Bull Salzburg	2026	2030
31	Saná Fernandes	(Guinea-Bissau)	RW / LW	10 March 1999 (age 27)	Academy	2023	2028
—	Pietro Pinelli	(Italy)	DM	18 February 2006 (age 20)	Academy	2026	2027

== Transfers ==
=== Summer window ===
==== In ====
Date	Pos.	Player	From	Fee	Notes	Ref.
1 July 2026	FW	(Senegal) Boulaye Dia	(Italy) Salernitana	€11,300,000	From loan to permanent transfer	
3 July 2026	DF	(Spain) Alfonso Pedraza	(Spain) Villarreal	Free		
14 July 2026	DF	(Netherlands) Danilho Doekhi	(Germany) Union Berlin	Free		
17 July 2026	MF	(Spain) Bruno Galassi	(Spain) Real Madrid	Undisclosed		
27 August 2026	FW	(Italy) Andrea Pinamonti	(Italy) Sassuolo	€3,000,000		
8 September 2026	DF	(Portugal) Diogo Leite	Unattached	Free		

==== Loans in ====
Date	Pos.	Player	From	Fee	Notes	Ref.
14 August 2026	MF	(Italy) Davide Frattesi	(Italy) Internazionale	€5,000,000	Option to buy for €10,000,000	
22 August 2026	DF	(Croatia) Josip Šutalo	(Netherlands) Ajax	€3,000,000	Option to buy for €7,500,000	
1 September 2026	FW	(Iceland) Albert Guðmundsson	(Italy) Fiorentina	Free		

==== Loan returns ====
Date	Pos.	Player	From	Fee	Notes	Ref.
1 July 2026	GK	(Greece) Christos Mandas	(England) Bournemouth	Free	Option to buy not exercised	
1 July 2026	GK	(Italy) Davide Renzetti	(Italy) Bra	Free		
1 July 2026	DF	(Brazil) Filipe Bordon	(Italy) Südtirol	Free	Option to buy not exercised	
1 July 2026	DF	(Algeria) Mohamed Farès	(United Arab Emirates) Forte Virtus	Free	Option to buy not exercised	
1 July 2026	DF	(Italy) Romano Floriani Mussolini	(Italy) Cremonese	Free	Option to buy not exercised	
1 July 2026	DF	(Venezuela) Alessandro Milani	(Italy) Avellino	Free	Option to buy not exercised	
1 July 2026	MF	(Italy) Leonardo Di Tommaso	(Italy) Audace Cerignola	Free		
1 July 2026	MF	(Italy) Pietro Pinelli	(Italy) Reggiana	Free		
1 July 2026	FW	(Italy) Gabriele Artistico	(Italy) Spezia	Free	Option to buy not exercised	

==== Out ====
Date	Pos.	Player	To	Fee	Notes	Ref.
30 June 2026	DF	(Albania) Elseid Hysaj	Unattached	Free	End of contract	
30 June 2026	MF	(Spain) Cristo Muñoz	Unattached	Free	End of contract	
30 June 2026	FW	(Spain) Pedro	Retired	Free	End of contract	
30 June 2026	MF	(Croatia) Toma Bašić	(Italy) Venezia	Free	End of contract	
8 July 2026	GK	(Italy) Ivan Provedel	(Italy) Internazionale	€3,000,000		
10 July 2026	DF	(Spain) Mario Gila	(Italy) Milan	€30,000,000		
24 July 2026	DF	(Venezuela) Alessandro Milani	(Italy) Internazionale	Undisclosed	Joined Internazionale Under-23	
1 September 2026	DF	(France) Samuel Gigot	Unattached	Released		
1 September 2026	DF	(Italy) Alessio Romagnoli	(Qatar) Al Sadd	€3,000,000		
1 September 2026	FW	(Italy) Gabriele Artistico	(Italy) Padova	€3,000,000		
28 September 2026	DF	(Spain) Patric	(United Arab Emirates) Al-Ittifaq	Free		

==== Loans out ====
Date	Pos.	Player	To	Fee	Notes	Ref.
9 July 2026	MF	(Italy) Pietro Pinelli	(Italy) Carrarese	Free		
13 August 2026	FW	(Portugal) Saná Fernandes	(Italy) Juve Stabia	Free	Option to buy for an undisclosed fee, buy-back option for an undisclosed fee	
1 September 2026	FW	(Serbia) Petar Ratkov	(Spain) Levante	€2,000,000		
1 September 2026	FW	(Senegal) Boulaye Dia	(France) Rennes	€2,000,000	Option to buy for €9,000,000, becomes obligation to buy if certain conditions are met	

==== Loan returns ====
Date	Pos.	Player	To	Fee	Notes	Ref.
30 June 2026	MF	(Italy) Daniel Maldini	(Italy) Atalanta	Free	Option to buy not exercised	

=== Winter window ===
==== In ====
Date	Pos.	Player	From	Fee	Notes	Ref.

==== Loans in ====
Date	Pos.	Player	From	Fee	Notes	Ref.

==== Out ====
Date	Pos.	Player	To	Fee	Notes	Ref.

==== Loans out ====
Date	Pos.	Player	To	Fee	Notes	Ref.

== Friendlies ==
=== Pre-season ===
20 July 2026 Friendly	Lazio	3–1	Lazio Under-20	Rome, Italy
18:00 CEST (UTC+2)	Artistico 56' (pen.), 82' (pen.); Fernandes 89'	Report	Avram 42'	Stadium: SS Lazio Training Center; Attendance: 0

26 July 2026 Friendly	Lazio	6–0	Flaminia Civita Castellana	Rome, Italy
18:00 CEST (UTC+2)	Cancellieri 3'; Dele-Bashiru 31'; Bordon 41'; Ratkov 46'; Rovella 55'; Pellegrini (yellow card) 69'; Zaccagni 90+3' (pen.)	Report		Stadium: Stadio Mirko Fersini; Referee: Marco Burattini

1 August 2026 Friendly	Lazio	6–3	Avellino	Rome, Italy
11:00 CEST (UTC+2)	Serra 15'; Ratkov 22', 36'; Belahyane 46'; Artistico 53' (pen.); Taylor 90+1'	Report	Di Maggio 12'; Besaggio 67'; Pandolfi 74'	Stadium: Stadio Mirko Fersini; Referee: Mario Perri

2 August 2026 Friendly	Ascoli	1–2	Lazio	Ascoli Piceno, Italy
20:45 CEST (UTC+2)	Chakir 61'	Report	Zaccagni 66'; Ratkov 88'	Stadium: Stadio Cino e Lillo Del Duca; Referee: Andrea Zanotti

5 August 2026 Friendly	Lazio	4–0	Ostiamare	Rome, Italy
18:00 CEST (UTC+2)	Ratkov 19', 41'; Romagnoli (yellow card) 59'; Zaccagni 73', 79'	Report	Tonin (yellow card) 58'	Stadium: Stadio Mirko Fersini; Referee: Livio Marinelli

9 August 2026 Friendly	Frosinone	1–2	Lazio	Frosinone, Italy
20:45 CEST (UTC+2)	Calò 12'; Bracaglia (yellow card) 34'; Oyono (yellow card) 53'; Akpoguma (yellow card) 68'; Cittadini (yellow card) 90+1'	Report	Zaccagni 22', 89' (pen.); Cancellieri (yellow card) 57'; Floriani Mussolini (yellow card) 70'	Stadium: Stadio Benito Stirpe; Referee: Domenico Mirabella

=== Mid-season ===
27 September 2026 Friendly	Lazio	2–0	Arezzo	Rome, Italy
15:00 CEST (UTC+2)	Pinamonti 1'; Leite 47'	Report		Stadium: Stadio Mirko Fersini; Referee: Mario Perri

3 October 2026 Friendly	Lazio	3–3	Juve Stabia	Rome, Italy
15:00 CEST (UTC+2)	Motta (yellow card) 5'; Noslin 31'; Zaccagni 39'; Pinamonti (penalty missed) 53', 78'	Report	Buglio 33'; Maistro 42'; Fernandes 66'	Stadium: Stadio Mirko Fersini; Referee: Ciro Aldi

14 November 2026 Friendly	Lazio	3–0	Mġarr United	Rome, Italy
11:00 CET (UTC+1)	Cancellieri 31'; Leite 36'; Rovella 51'	Report		Stadium: Stadio Mirko Fersini; Referee: Alessandro Colelli

== Competitions ==
=== Overall record ===
Competition	First match	Last match	Starting round	Final position	Record							
Competition	First match	Last match	Starting round	Final position	Pld	W	D	L	GF	GA	GD	Win %
Serie A	24 August 2026	30 May 2027	Matchday 1	TBD	12	10	2	0	28	9	+19	83.33
Coppa Italia	16 August 2026		First round	First round	1	0	0	1	0	2	−2	0.00
Supercoppa Italiana	22 December 2026		Final	TBD	0	0	0	0	0	0	+0	—
Total					13	10	2	1	28	11	+17	76.92

Last updated: 8 November 2026
Source: Soccerway

=== Serie A ===
==== League table ====
Pos	Team	Pld	W	D	L	GF	GA	GD	Pts	Qualification or relegation
1	Lazio	12	10	2	0	28	9	+19	32	Qualification for the Champions League league phase
2	Roma	12	9	3	0	36	11	+25	30	Qualification for the Champions League league phase
3	Inter Milan	11	9	1	1	28	13	+15	28	Qualification for the Champions League league phase
4	Como	12	8	2	2	20	10	+10	26	Qualification for the Champions League league phase
5	AC Milan	11	7	3	1	23	13	+10	24	Qualification for the Europa League league phase (Note: The winners of the 2026–27 Coppa Italia and the fifth-placed team both qualify for the Europa League league phase. If the Coppa Italia winners finish in the top five, the sixth-placed team will qualify for the Europa League league phase. If Italy are one of the two associations with the highest UEFA coefficient points, fifth place will qualify for the Champions League league phase and the other qualifying spots will move down one position.)

Updated to match(es) played on 21 November 2026. Source: Serie A
Rules for classification: 1) Points; 2) Head-to-head points; 3) Head-to-head goal difference; 4) Goal difference; 5) Goals scored; 6) Drawing of lots.
End-of-season ties on points for 1st or 17th are instead decided by a one- or two-leg play-off, respectively, unless the play-off would involve a UEFA competition finalist (in which case rules 2–6 apply). Rules 2–6 determine home advantage (for 17th, the better-ranked team hosts the second leg); if three or more teams are tied, they also select the two play-off teams.

==== Results summary ====
Overall								Home						Away					
Pld	W	D	L	GF	GA	GD	Pts	W	D	L	GF	GA	GD	W	D	L	GF	GA	GD
12	10	2	0	28	9	+19	32	5	1	0	13	5	+8	5	1	0	15	4	+11

Last updated: 21 November 2026.
Source: Serie A

==== Results by round ====
Round	1	2	3	4	5	6	7	8	9	10	11	12	13	14	15	16	17	18	19	20	21	22	23	24	25	26	27	28	29	30	31	32	33	34	35	36	37	38
Ground	A	H	A	H	A	H	A	H	A	H	A	H	A	H	H	A	A	H	A	H	A	H	A	A	H	A	H	H	A	A	H	A	H	A	H	H	A	H
Result	W	W	W	D	W	W	W	W	W	W	D	W																										
Position	9	6	3	4	3	2	2	2	2	1	1	1																										

Updated to match(es) played on 21 November 2026. Source: Serie A
A = Away; H = Home; W = Win; D = Draw; L = Loss

==== Matches ====
The league fixtures were announced on 5 June 2026.

24 August 2026 1	Bologna	0–1	Lazio	Bologna
18:30 CEST (UTC+2)	El Azzouzi (yellow card) 34'; Cambiaghi (yellow card) 41'; Odgaard (yellow card) 84'; Haggem (yellow card) 84'	Report	Floriani Mussolini (yellow card) 22'; Dia (yellow card) 34'; Cancellieri (yellow card) 44'; Frattesi 59'; Provstgaard (yellow card) 90+3'	Stadium: Stadio Renato Dall'Ara; Attendance: 28,211; Referee: Fabio Maresca

30 August 2026 2	Lazio	1–0	Genoa	Rome
20:45 CEST (UTC+2)	Frattesi 25'; Zaccagni (yellow card) 90+5'	Report	Østigård (yellow card) 14'; Amorim (yellow card) 90+5'	Stadium: Stadio Olimpico; Attendance: 6,058; Referee: Ermanno Feliciani

7 September 2026 3	Udinese	1–2	Lazio	Udine
20:45 CEST (UTC+2)	Piotrowski (yellow card) 13'; Miller (yellow card) 23'; Karlström (yellow card) 45+4', (goal) 49'; Bayo (yellow card) 67'; Bertola (yellow card) 84'	Report	Isaksen (yellow card) 25'; Frattesi 75'; Guðmundsson 88'	Stadium: Stadio Friuli; Attendance: 23,312; Referee: Paride Tremolada

12 September 2026 4	Lazio	2–2	Milan	Rome
18:00 CEST (UTC+2)	Cancellieri 10'; Noslin 39'; Belahyane (yellow card) 63'; Zaccagni (yellow card) 78'	Report	Pulisic (yellow card) 59'; Pavlović (yellow card) 64'; Moreira 65', 67'; Gila (yellow card) 86'	Stadium: Stadio Olimpico; Attendance: 10,500; Referee: Matteo Mercenaro

19 September 2026 5	Venezia	0–2	Lazio	Venice
20:45 CEST (UTC+2)	Yeboah (penalty missed) 17'; Pérez (yellow card) 29'; Juan Jesus (yellow card) 59'; Correia (yellow card) 74'; Fernández (yellow card) 90'; Schingtienne (yellow card) 90+1'; Moreno (yellow card) 90+2'	Report	Zaccagni 51' (pen.); Noslin 60'	Stadium: Stadio Pier Luigi Penzo; Attendance: 11,168; Referee: Simone Sozza

11 October 2026 6	Lazio	3–1	Monza	Rome
15:00 CEST (UTC+2)	Tavares 3'; Isaksen 23'; Doekhi (yellow card) 45+2'; Provstgaard (yellow card) 55'; Leite (yellow card) 68'; Pinamonti 88'	Report	Carboni (yellow card) 13'; Lucchesi (red card) 35'; Goglichidze 46'	Stadium: Stadio Olimpico; Attendance: 11,500; Referee: Giuseppe Collu

18 October 2026 7	Juventus	0–3	Lazio	Turin
20:45 CEST (UTC+2)		Report	Provstgaard 37'; Taylor (yellow card) 41'; Zaccagni (yellow card) 48'; Isaksen 66'; Dele-Bashiru 89'	Stadium: Juventus Stadium; Attendance: 41,112; Referee: Davide Massa

24 October 2026 8	Lazio	2–1	Parma	Rome
20:45 CEST (UTC+2)	Provstgaard (yellow card) 31'; Taylor 50'; Diego Carlos 58' (o.g.)	Report	Sierro (yellow card) 38'; Lontani 90+5'	Stadium: Stadio Olimpico; Attendance: 10,000; Referee: Alberto Arena

27 October 2026 9	Sassuolo	2–6	Lazio	Reggio Emilia
18:30 CET (UTC+1)	Šutalo 7' (o.g.); Thorstvedt (red card) 31'; Esposito 43'; Berardi (yellow card) 54'	Report	Taylor 2', (yellow card) 28'; Isaksen 13'; Floriani Mussolini 16'; Zaccagni 45+1', (penalty missed) 50'; Noslin 55', 65'; Frattesi (penalty missed) 61'	Stadium: Mapei Stadium – Città del Tricolore; Attendance: 17,324; Referee: Luca Zufferli

1 November 2026 10	Lazio	2–1	Cagliari	Rome
15:00 CET (UTC+1)	Isaksen 36'; Pinamonti 83', (yellow card) 84'	Report	Nzola 21'; Fazzini (yellow card) 59'; Rodríguez (yellow card) 66'; Obert (yellow card) 77' (yellow-red card) 90+1'	Stadium: Stadio Olimpico; Attendance: 12,649; Referee: Andrea Colombo

8 November 2026 11	Napoli	1–1	Lazio	Naples
12:30 CET (UTC+1)	Lang (yellow card) 44'; Pedraza 48' (o.g.); Gilmour (yellow card) 65'; Vergara (yellow card) 65'	Report	Frattesi 28'; Pedraza (yellow card) 78'	Stadium: Stadio Diego Armando Maradona; Attendance: 47,000; Referee: Luca Pairetto

21 November 2026 12	Lazio	3–0	Lecce	Rome
15:00 CET (UTC+1)	Noslin 25', 68'; Pellegrini (yellow card) 87'; Frattesi 90'	Report	Siebert (yellow card) 50'; Veiga (yellow card) 77'	Stadium: Stadio Olimpico; Referee: Matteo Marcenaro

28 November 2026 13	Torino	v	Lazio	Turin
18:00 CET (UTC+1)		Report		Stadium: Stadio Olimpico Grande Torino

6 December 2026 14	Lazio	v	Atalanta	Rome
15:00 CET (UTC+1)		Report		Stadium: Stadio Olimpico

13 December 2026 15	Lazio	v	Roma	Rome
12:30 CET (UTC+1)		Report		Stadium: Stadio Olimpico

18 December 2026 16	Frosinone	v	Lazio	Frosinone
18:30 CET (UTC+1)		Report		Stadium: Stadio Benito Stirpe

2 January 2027 17	Fiorentina	v	Lazio	Florence
15:00 CET (UTC+1)		Report		Stadium: Stadio Artemio Franchi

6 January 2027 18	Lazio	v	Internazionale	Rome
20:45 CET (UTC+1)		Report		Stadium: Stadio Olimpico

10 January 2027 19	Como	v	Lazio	Como
12:30 CET (UTC+1)		Report		Stadium: Stadio Giuseppe Sinigaglia

16 January 2027 20	Lazio	v	Bologna	Rome
--:-- CET (UTC+1)		Report		Stadium: Stadio Olimpico

23 January 2027 21	Monza	v	Lazio	Monza
--:-- CET (UTC+1)		Report		Stadium: Stadio Brianteo

30 January 2027 22	Lazio	v	Venezia	Rome
--:-- CET (UTC+1)		Report		Stadium: Stadio Olimpico

6 February 2027 23	Atalanta	v	Lazio	Bergamo
--:-- CET (UTC+1)		Report		Stadium: Gewiss Stadium

13 February 2027 24	Cagliari	v	Lazio	Cagliari
--:-- CET (UTC+1)		Report		Stadium: Unipol Domus

20 February 2027 25	Lazio	v	Napoli	Rome
--:-- CET (UTC+1)		Report		Stadium: Stadio Olimpico

27 February 2027 26	Genoa	v	Lazio	Genoa
--:-- CET (UTC+1)		Report		Stadium: Stadio Luigi Ferraris

6 March 2027 27	Lazio	v	Frosinone	Rome
--:-- CET (UTC+1)		Report		Stadium: Stadio Olimpico

13 March 2027 28	Lazio	v	Juventus	Rome
--:-- CET (UTC+1)		Report		Stadium: Stadio Olimpico

20 March 2027 29	Parma	v	Lazio	Parma
--:-- CET (UTC+1)		Report		Stadium: Stadio Ennio Tardini

3 April 2027 30	Lecce	v	Lazio	Lecce
--:-- CEST (UTC+2)		Report		Stadium: Stadio Via del mare

10 April 2027 31	Lazio	v	Torino	Rome
--:-- CEST (UTC+2)		Report		Stadium: Stadio Olimpico

17 April 2027 32	Roma	v	Lazio	Rome
--:-- CEST (UTC+2)		Report		Stadium: Stadio Olimpico

24 April 2027 33	Lazio	v	Como	Rome
--:-- CEST (UTC+2)		Report		Stadium: Stadio Olimpico

1 May 2027 34	Milan	v	Lazio	Milan
--:-- CEST (UTC+2)		Report		Stadium: San Siro

8 May 2027 35	Lazio	v	Sassuolo	Rome
--:-- CEST (UTC+2)		Report		Stadium: Stadio Olimpico

15 May 2027 36	Lazio	v	Udinese	Rome
--:-- CEST (UTC+2)		Report		Stadium: Stadio Olimpico

22 May 2027 37	Internazionale	v	Lazio	Milan
--:-- CEST (UTC+2)		Report		Stadium: San Siro

29 May 2027 38	Lazio	v	Fiorentina	Rome
--:-- CEST (UTC+2)		Report		Stadium: Stadio Olimpico

=== Coppa Italia ===
16 August 2026 First round	Lazio	0–2	Mantova	Rome
21:15 CEST (UTC+2)	Rovella (yellow card) 25'; Dele-Bashiru (yellow card) 56'; Cancellieri (yellow card) 79'	Report	Tomašević (yellow card) 21'; Ruocco 75'; Cajazzo 90+6'	Stadium: Stadio Olimpico; Attendance: 6,286; Referee: Giuseppe Mucera

=== Supercoppa Italiana ===
22 December 2026 Final	Internazionale	v	Lazio	Milan
21:00 CET (UTC+1)				Stadium: San Siro

== Statistics ==
=== Appearances and goals ===
Players with no appearances are not included on the list.

As of match played 21 November 2026

No.	Pos	Nat	Player	Total		Serie A		Coppa Italia		Supercoppa Italiana	
No.	Pos	Nat	Player	Apps	Goals	Apps	Goals	Apps	Goals	Apps	Goals
Goalkeepers
35	GK	(Greece) GRE	Christos Mandas	13	0	12	0	1	0	0	0
Defenders
2	DF	(Portugal) POR	Diogo Leite	7	0	2+5	0	0	0	0	0
3	DF	(Italy) ITA	Luca Pellegrini	2	0	0+1	0	0+1	0	0	0
5	DF	(Netherlands) NED	Danilho Doekhi	6	0	5	0	1	0	0	0
15	DF	(Italy) ITA	Romano Floriani Mussolini	12	1	11+1	1	0	0	0	0
17	DF	(Portugal) POR	Nuno Tavares	11	1	10+1	1	0	0	0	0
23	DF	(Spain) ESP	Alfonso Pedraza	12	0	2+9	0	1	0	0	0
25	DF	(Denmark) DEN	Oliver Provstgaard	11	1	10	1	1	0	0	0
29	DF	(Italy) ITA	Manuel Lazzari	7	0	0+7	0	0	0	0	0
37	DF	(Croatia) CRO	Josip Šutalo	8	0	7+1	0	0	0	0	0
77	DF	(Montenegro) MNE	Adam Marušić	2	0	1	0	1	0	0	0
Midfielders
6	MF	(Italy) ITA	Nicolò Rovella	4	0	2+1	0	1	0	0	0
7	MF	(Nigeria) NGR	Fisayo Dele-Bashiru	9	1	1+7	1	1	0	0	0
10	MF	(Italy) ITA	Mattia Zaccagni	11	2	10	2	1	0	0	0
16	MF	(Italy) ITA	Davide Frattesi	13	5	11+1	5	0+1	0	0	0
21	MF	(Morocco) MAR	Reda Belahyane	12	0	10+1	0	0+1	0	0	0
24	MF	(Netherlands) NED	Kenneth Taylor	13	2	12	2	1	0	0	0
32	MF	(Italy) ITA	Danilo Cataldi	1	0	0+1	0	0	0	0	0
Forwards
9	FW	(Italy) ITA	Andrea Pinamonti	10	2	3+7	2	0	0	0	0
11	FW	(Denmark) DEN	Gustav Isaksen	12	4	8+4	4	0	0	0	0
14	FW	(Netherlands) NED	Tijjani Noslin	12	6	9+2	6	0+1	0	0	0
22	FW	(Italy) ITA	Matteo Cancellieri	9	1	4+4	1	1	0	0	0
80	FW	(Iceland) ISL	Albert Guðmundsson	4	1	0+4	1	0	0	0	0
Players loaned/transferred out during the season
19	FW	(Senegal) SEN	Boulaye Dia	3	0	2	0	1	0	0	0
20	FW	(Serbia) SRB	Petar Ratkov	1	0	0	0	0+1	0	0	0

Last updated: 21 November 2026
Source: Competitions
