= Diogo Oliveira =

Diogo Oliveira may refer to:

- Diogo Oliveira (footballer, born 1982), Brazilian football midfielder
- Diogo Oliveira (footballer, born 1983) (1983–2021), Brazilian football forward
- Diogo Oliveira (footballer, born 1986), Brazilian football defensive midfielder
- Diogo (footballer, born 1988), Diogo da Costa Oliveira, Brazilian football wing-back
- Diogo de Olivera (born 1996), Brazilian football forward
