= Malaquias =

Malaquias is a given name and surname of Portuguese origin.

== People with the given name ==
- Malaquías Concha (1859–1921), Chilean writer, lawyer and politician
- Malaquías Montoya (born 1938), American born Chicano poster artist

== People with the surname ==
- Arturo Malaquias (born 1975), Mexican long-distance runner
- Diogo Malaquías (born 1988), Brazilian footballer
- Domingos Malaquias de Aguiar Pires Ferreira, 1st Baron of Cimbres (1788–1859), Brazilian businessman and politician
- Florbela Malaquias (born 1959), Angolan politician

== See also ==
- Malaquin
