= Diogo Pires =

Diogo Pires may refer to:

- Diogo Pires (Brazilian footballer) (born 1981)
- Diogo Pires (Portuguese footballer) (born 1993)
- Diogo Pires (Portuguese radio personality) (born 1997)
- Solomon Molcho, born Diogo Pires (c.1500-1532), Portuguese Jewish mystic
- Didacus Pyrrhus, born Diogo Pires (1517-1607), Portuguese-born Jewish poet and humanist
