= Samuel Cruz (footballer) =

Portuguese footballer (born 1993)

Personal information
- Full name: Samuel Almeida Braz Waterland Cruz
- Date of birth: 17 March 1993 (age 33)
- Place of birth: Miragaia, Portugal
- Height: 1.80 m (5 ft 11 in)
- Position: Midfielder

Youth career
- 2006–2007: Académico do Fundão
- 2007–2012: Sporting Covilhã

Senior career*
Years	Team	Apps	(Gls)
2012	Sporting Covilhã		
2013	Atalaia do Campo		
2013–2015	Sporting Covilhã	23	(2)
2016	Tourizense	12	(1)
2016–2017	Benfica e Castelo Branco	9	(0)
2017–2019	Alcains	32	(0)
- * Club domestic league appearances and goals

Samuel Almeida Braz Waterland Cruz (born 17 March 1993) is a Portuguese footballer who plays as a midfielder.

== Career ==
On 31 July 2013, Cruz made his professional debut with Sporting Covilhã in a 2013–14 Taça da Liga match against Desportivo Chaves, replacing Diogo Gaspar (78th minute). In the first match of the 2013–14 Segunda Liga season against Marítimo B on the 11 August, he started the game and made his league debut.
