= Samuel Cruz =

Samuel Cruz may refer to:

- Samuel Cruz (footballer)
- Samuel Cruz (athlete)
