= Bruno Galassi =

Spanish footballer (born 2007)

Personal information
- Date of birth: 7 February 2007 (age 19)
- Place of birth: Lleida, Spain
- Height: 1.84 m (6 ft 0 in)
- Position: Midfielder

Team information
- Current team: Lazio
- Number: 8

Youth career
- –2021: Rayo
- 2021–2023: Getafe
- 2023–2026: Real Madrid

Senior career*
Years	Team	Apps	(Gls)
2025–2026	Real Madrid C	8	(1)
2026	Real Madrid B	0	(0)
2026–	Lazio	0	(0)
- * Club domestic league appearances and goals

Bruno Galassi (born 7 February 2007) is a Spanish professional footballer who plays as a midfielder for Serie A club Lazio.

== Early life ==
Galassi was born on 7 February 2007 in Lleida, Spain and is of Argentine descent through his parents. The son of Eric, his parents are natives of Santa Fe Province, Argentina and moved to Spain in 2001, and he obtained Argentine citizenship and Spanish citizenship.

== Career ==
As a youth player, Galassi joined the youth academy of Spanish side Rayo Vallecano. Following his stint there, he joined the youth academy of Spanish side Getafe in 2021. During the summer of 2023, he joined the youth academy of Spanish side Real Madrid, helping the club's under-19 team win the 2025–26 UEFA Youth League. While playing for them, he also played in the Premier League International Cup.

In 2025, he was promoted to their C team, where he made eight league appearances and scored one goal. On 6 September 2025, he debuted and scored his first goal for them during a 2–1 away win over Moscardó in the league. On 4 January 2026, he was first called up to their reserve team during a 2–0 home win over Arenteiro in the league. Ahead of the 2026–27 season, he signed for Serie A side Lazio.

== Style of play ==
Galassi plays as a midfielder. Right-footed, he is known for his versatility.

Italian news website calciocapitolino.it wrote in 2026 that he is "considered a modern midfielder with outstanding defensive qualities. Standing 184 centimeters tall, he stands out for his ability to play various positions in defence and midfield. Throughout his footballing career, he has mainly played as a defensive midfielder, but has also been employed as a central defender thanks to his physical build, positional awareness, and ability to read game situations... [he] combines quality in the defensive phase with good ability to build up play, proving effective both in recovering the ball and in building play from the back".
