= Oliver Provstgaard =

Danish footballer (born 2003)

Personal information
- Full name: Oliver Provstgaard Nielsen
- Date of birth: 4 June 2003 (age 23)
- Place of birth: Copenhagen, Denmark
- Height: 1.94 m (6 ft 4 in)
- Position: Centre-back

Team information
- Current team: Lazio
- Number: 25

Youth career
- Bredballe IF
- 2015–2019: Vejle

Senior career*
| Years | Team | Apps | (Gls) |
| 2019–2025 | Vejle | 83 | (3) |
| 2025– | Lazio | 35 | (1) |

International career^{‡}
| 2019 | Denmark U16 | 3 | (1) |
| 2019–2020 | Denmark U17 | 9 | (0) |
| 2020 | Denmark U18 | 1 | (0) |
| 2021–2022 | Denmark U19 | 3 | (0) |
| 2022 | Denmark U20 | 2 | (1) |
| 2023–2025 | Denmark U21 | 21 | (2) |
| 2026– | Denmark | 8 | (0) |
- * Club domestic league appearances and goals as of 23:45, 18 October 2026 (UTC) ‡ National team caps and goals as of 17 November 2026

Oliver Provstgaard Nielsen (born 4 June 2003) is a Danish professional footballer who plays as a centre-back for Serie A club Lazio and the Denmark national team.

== Club career ==
=== Vejle ===
Born in Copenhagen, Provstgaard moved to Vejle at the age of four and joined Vejle Boldklub from Bredballe IF at under-13 level. He progressed through the club's youth system and was first named in the senior matchday squad on 7 October 2020 for a Danish Cup match against Hobro, although he remained an unused substitute.

In December 2020, Provstgaard suffered a serious knee injury in an under-19 match, which required surgery and kept him out for several months. Despite the injury, Vejle announced on 7 June 2021 that he had signed a new contract running until June 2024, effective from 1 January 2022, when he was also due to become a permanent member of the first-team squad. Provstgaard later said that the rehabilitation period had strengthened him both physically and mentally. Amid an injury crisis in Vejle's defence, Provstgaard made his first-team debut on 14 April 2022, playing the full match in a 2–1 defeat to OB in the Danish Superliga. On 27 May 2022, he signed a further contract extension until June 2026.

=== Lazio ===
On 3 February 2025, Provstgaard joined Italian club Lazio on a contract reported to run until June 2029. He made his Serie A debut on 6 April 2025, coming on as a substitute for Samuel Gigot in the 68th minute of a 1–0 away victory over Atalanta at the Gewiss Stadium in Bergamo, with compatriot Gustav Isaksen scoring the only goal. Head coach Marco Baroni said afterwards that "the new players also made an important contribution today", though Provstgaard made little further impression in the second half of the 2024–25 season, finishing with 33 minutes across two substitute appearances in total.

When Maurizio Sarri was appointed head coach for the 2025–26 season, Provstgaard's position at the club changed markedly. He featured consistently during pre-season and was selected to start Lazio's opening league fixture on 24 August 2025 away at Como, partnering Mario Gila in central defence while Alessio Romagnoli served a suspension. After Romagnoli's return narrowed his opportunities, Provstgaard continued to feature for the side, rotating in from the bench and occasionally starting. Among his most prominent performances was a home fixture against Fiorentina, in which he recorded 128 touches and completed 117 passes with just six errors, statistics noted by the Corriere dello Sport as indicative of an unusually authoritative display for a player of his age and experience. He started the 2–0 away victory over Napoli at the Stadio Diego Armando Maradona on 18 April 2026, a result in which Napoli registered no shots on target—a statistic not recorded against them at home in 21 years of Serie A football. Speaking to Lazio's official channel after the match, Provstgaard reflected on his development under Sarri: "I am very happy with my growth at Lazio, especially this year with the coach. I am learning so many things—also from Gila and Romagnoli. I feel ready to be a starter, but that must not be my choice; it must be the coach's."

== International career ==
Provstgaard has represented Denmark at youth international level from under-16 to under-21 level. He made three appearances and scored once for the under-16 team in 2019, before making nine appearances for the under-17s between 2019 and 2020.

He was first called up to the Denmark under-21 team in November 2022 by head coach Jesper Sørensen, and made his debut on 17 November, replacing Alexander Busch in a 2–2 friendly draw with Sweden.

Provstgaard later captained the under-21 side on several occasions in the absence of Maurits Kjærgaard, first doing so in a 0–0 draw against the Czech Republic on 17 October 2023. He again wore the armband in a 3–0 win over the Lithuania under-21 team on 26 March 2024, played at Vejle Stadium.

In March 2026, Provstgaard received his first call-up to the senior Denmark squad from head coach Brian Riemer for the 2026 FIFA World Cup qualification play-off against North Macedonia. He made his senior debut in the 4–0 victory, replacing Christian Nørgaard in the 86th minute.

== Personal life ==
Provstgaard is also an Esports player, winning the 2021 eChampions League and a $75,000 prize.

== Career statistics ==
=== Club ===
As of match played 18 October 2026

Appearances and goals by club, season and competition
| Club | Season | League | | | National cup (Note: Includes Danish Cup, Coppa Italia) | | Europe | | Other | | Total | |
| Club | Season | Division | Apps | Goals | Apps | Goals | Apps | Goals | Apps | Goals | Apps | Goals |
|---|---|---|---|---|---|---|---|---|---|---|---|---|
| Vejle Boldklub | 2021–22 | Danish Superliga | 5 | 0 | 2 | 0 | — | | — | | 7 | 0 |
| Vejle Boldklub | 2022–23 | Danish 1st Division | 30 | 2 | 6 | 0 | — | | — | | 36 | 2 |
| Vejle Boldklub | 2023–24 | Danish Superliga | 32 | 1 | 0 | 0 | — | | — | | 32 | 1 |
| Vejle Boldklub | 2024–25 | Danish Superliga | 16 | 0 | 0 | 0 | — | | — | | 16 | 0 |
| Vejle Boldklub | Total | | 83 | 3 | 8 | 0 | — | | — | | 91 | 3 |
| Lazio | 2024–25 | Serie A | 2 | 0 | 0 | 0 | 0 | 0 | — | | 2 | 0 |
| Lazio | 2025–26 | Serie A | 26 | 0 | 1 | 0 | — | | — | | 27 | 0 |
| Lazio | 2026–27 | Serie A | 7 | 1 | 1 | 0 | — | | 0 | 0 | 8 | 1 |
| Lazio | Total | | 35 | 1 | 2 | 0 | 0 | 0 | 0 | 0 | 37 | 1 |
| Career total | | | 118 | 4 | 10 | 0 | 0 | 0 | 0 | 0 | 128 | 4 |

=== International ===
As of match played 17 November 2026

Appearances and goals by national team and year
| National team | Year | Apps | Goals |
|---|---|---|---|
| Denmark | 2026 | 8 | 0 |
| Total | | 8 | 0 |

== Honours ==
Vejle

- Danish 1st Division: 2022–23
