= Ricardo Pedrosa =

Portuguese footballer

Personal information
- Full name: Ricardo Jorge de Sousa Pedrosa
- Date of birth: 2 January 1989 (age 37)
- Place of birth: Miragaia, Porto, Portugal
- Height: 1.71 m (5 ft 7 in)
- Position: Defender

Youth career
- 2005: Salgueiros
- 2006–2008: Boavista

Senior career*
Years	Team	Apps	(Gls)
2008–2010	Boavista	33	(3)
2010–2011	Gondomar	2	(0)
2011–2015	Tondela	67	(3)
2015–2016	Felgueiras 1932	30	(0)
2016–2017	Gondomar	18	(0)
2017–2021	SC Coimbrões	94	(1)
- * Club domestic league appearances and goals

Ricardo Jorge de Sousa Pedrosa (born 2 January 1989) is a Portuguese former footballer who played as a defender for Boavista, Gondomar, and Tondela.

== Career ==
Pedrosa made his professional debut in the Segunda Liga for Boavista on 19 April 2009 in a game against União de Leiria.
