= Miragaia =

- Civil parish
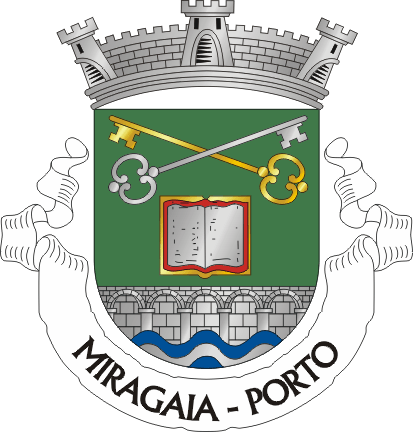
- Coat of arms

- Coordinates: 41.146°N 8.620°W
- Country: Portugal
- Region: Norte
- Metropolitan area: Metropolitan Area of Porto
- District: Porto
- Municipality: Porto
- Disbanded: 2013

Area
  - Total: 0.43 km^{2} (0.17 sq mi)

Population (2011)
  - Total: 2,067
  - Density: 4,800/km^{2} (12,000/sq mi)
- Time zone: UTC+00:00 (WET)
  - Summer (DST): UTC+01:00 (WEST)

Miragaia (Portuguese pronunciation: [miɾɐˈɣajɐ]) is a former civil parish in the municipality of Porto, Portugal. In 2013, the parish merged into the new parish Cedofeita, Santo Ildefonso, Sé, Miragaia, São Nicolau e Vitória. The population in 2011 was 2,067, in an area of 0.43 km^{2} (0.17 square miles).

Local landmarks include Santo António Hospital, the ancient city walls of Porto, built by Ferdinand I, the Chafariz da Colher fountain and several palaces and churches. Its jewish and moorish quarters used to be known as Bairro de Monchique.

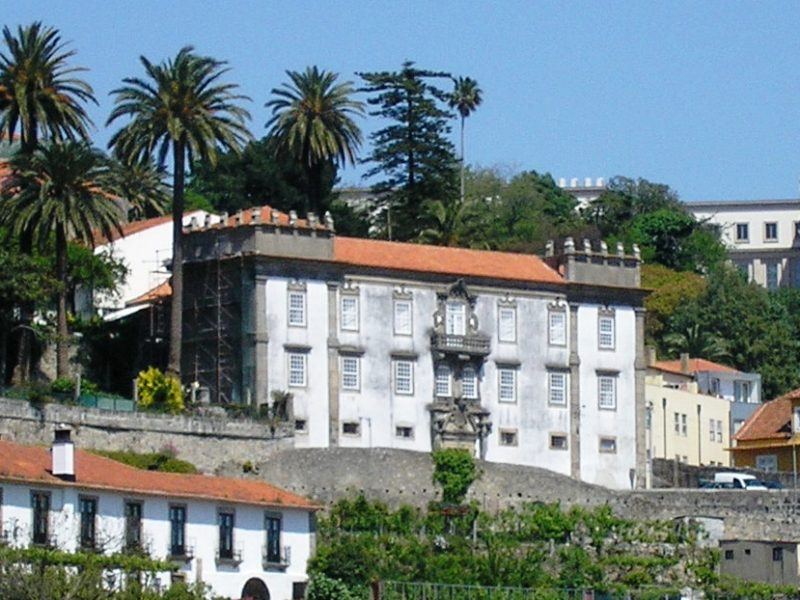
Palace of Sereias

== Notable people from Miragaia ==
- Gabriel Azevedo Mendes (b. 1954), football player
- Luís Manuel Gonçalves Marques Mendes (b. 1957), politician
- José Sócrates Carvalho Pinto de Sousa (b. 1957), former Prime Minister
- Fernando Manuel Silva Leal (Nandinho) (b. 1982), futsal player
- Ricardo Jorge de Sousa Pedrosa (b. 1989), football player
- Samuel Almeida Bráz Waterland Cruz (b. 1993), football player
- Jorge Manuel Pereira Santos (Gazela) (b. 1994), football player
