= Gazela (footballer) =

Portuguese footballer

Personal information
- Full name: Jorge Manuel Pereira Santos
- Date of birth: 10 March 1993 (age 33)
- Place of birth: Miragaia, Portugal
- Height: 1.85 m (6 ft 1 in)
- Position: Winger

Team information
- Current team: ADC Lobão

Youth career
- 2004–2006: Porto
- 2006–2011: Padroense

Senior career*
Years	Team	Apps	(Gls)
2011−2014	Padroense	67	(11)
2014−2015	Sporting B	1	(0)
2015	→ Salgueiros 08 (loan)	13	(0)
2015–2016	Salgueiros	13	(4)
2016–2017	Gondomar	32	(2)
2017–2018	Benfica Castelo Branco	29	(8)
2018–2019	Sanjoanense	27	(2)
2019–2020	Benfica Castelo Branco	8	(1)
2020–2021	Paredes	13	(0)
2021–2022	SC Paivense (Castelo de Paiva)	8	(1)
2022–2023	Cesarense	8	(0)
2023–2024	Pedras Rubras	23	(3)
2024–2025	Oliveira do Douro	18	(0)
2025–	ADC Lobão	17	(0)
- * Club domestic league appearances and goals as of 11 February 2026

Jorge Manuel Pereira Santos (born 10 March 1993) known as Gazela, is a Portuguese footballer who last played for ADC Lobão as a winger.

== Career ==
Gazela was born in Miragaia. In June 2014, he was bought from Padroense FC, signing a six-season contract with Sporting and having a release clause of over €45 million.

On 10 August 2014, Santos made his professional debut with Sporting B in a 2014–15 Segunda Liga match against Farense. Unable to establish himself or even play for the first team, he was loaned out for most of his contract.

A fast left winger, he earned the nickname "Gazela" (gazelle) while still in FC Porto's youth ranks.
