= Anchorage Digital =

Digital asset platform

- Industry: Financial technology
- Founded: 2017
- Founders: Diogo Mónica; Nathan McCauley
- Headquarters: San Francisco, California
- Area served: Global
- Key people: Diogo Mónica, President; Nathan McCauley, CEO
- Services: Digital asset management including cryptocurrencies
- Website: www.anchorage.com

Anchorage Digital is a digital asset platform and infrastructure provider that deals in the holding, investing, and infrastructure for cryptocurrency and cryptocurrency products.

== History ==
Anchorage Digital was founded in 2017 by Diogo Mónica and Nathan McCauley. Early investors included Andreessen Horowitz and Blockchain Capital.

Anchorage Digital made its first acquisition in 2020 with the purchase of Merkle Data. The same year it also added trading and financing services. Anchorage Digital opened an engineering hub in Porto, Portugal in 2020 and is the first cryptocurrency unicorn with a presence in that country.

In 2021, Anchorage Digital Bank received its banking charter from the Office of the Comptroller of the Currency, making it the first federally chartered cryptocurrency bank in the United States. The same year, it was contracted by the United States Department of Justice to be the custodian for all digital assets seized or forfeited in criminal cases. It also became the first known United States bank to custody a NFT by facilitating a purchase for Visa.

In December 2021, Anchorage Digital had raised capital from investors such as KKR, Goldman Sachs, GIC (Singaporean sovereign wealth fund), and Wellington Management. It expanded into Asia in 2022 with institutional partners, opening an office in Singapore. As of 2022, Anchorage Digital was valued at more than $3 billion, and was the only federally chartered cryptocurrency bank as of 2023.

In February 2026, stablecoin company Tether invested $100 million in Anchorage Digital, raising the company's valuation to $4.2 billion.

== Services ==
Anchorage Digital is a custodian of digital assets for financial institutions such as banks, venture capital firms, and fintechs, as well as governments. It uses biometric authentication and hardware security modules for storing and securing cryptocurrency. It also provides lending and trading of digital assets, including infrastructure used by companies to build cryptocurrency products.
