= Diogo Leite =

Diogo Leite may refer to:

- Diogo Leite (footballer, born 1989), Portuguese footballer
- Diogo Leite (footballer, born 1999), Portuguese footballer
