= Chafariz da Colher =

Fountain in Porto, Portugal

- Fonte da Colher
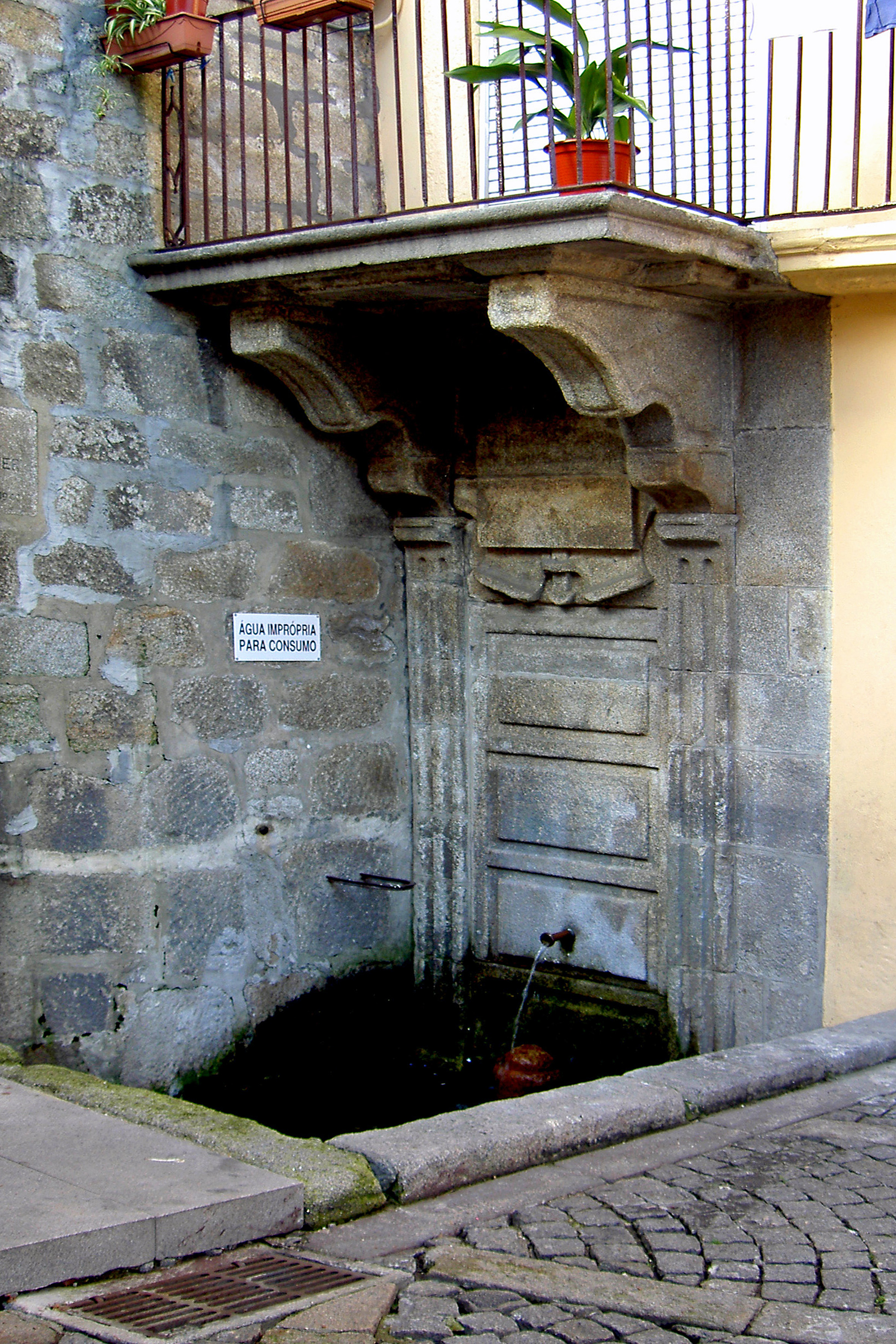
- Artist: Unknown
- Year: fl. 1491
- Medium: Granite Fountain
- Location: Porto, Portugal
- 41°8′37.28″N 8°37′17.04″W
- Owner: Instituto Gestão do Patrimonio Arquitectónico e Arqueológico

The Fountain of Colher (Portuguese: Fonte da Colher) is a fountain in the civil parish of Miragaia, in the municipality of Porto, under the level of the Rua Nova da Alfândega.

== History ==
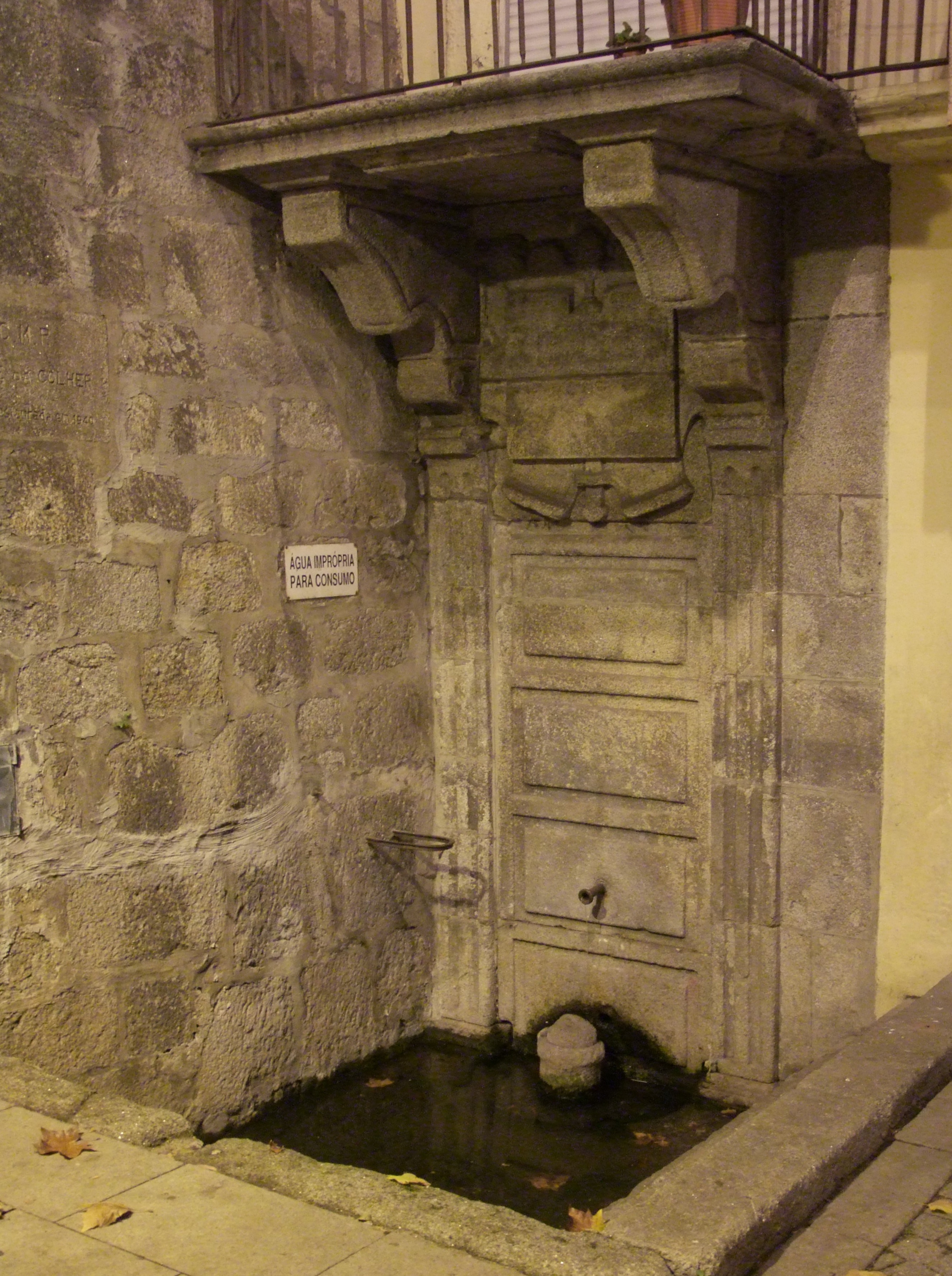
The fountain of Colhar as seen along the corner of the buildings in Rua Nova da Alfândega

Although it had an inscription from 1629, it is likely the construction dates earlier, because in the District Archive of Porto, a registry document in Sé (Livro LXXIX das Sentenças, 1491, p. 151) referred to a conditional contract for 300 réis, imposed on all homes in Miragaia.

The name of the fountain came from the imposed collection of payment for the waters. Colher is Portuguese for spoon, which was the measure of payment for all goods sold in Porto (bread, flour, walnuts, etc.), which arrived by land or river. The products that arrived by land were paid as tribute at the gate of the Sé to the bishop. Those that arrived by river and normally sold at the fair near the Miragaia shipyards were paid at the fountain. The merchants, for each alqueire of product, was required to pay on colher (spoon) of tribute.

The waters of the fountain was considered one of the better quality sources. It is believed that the fountain was one of the oldest, still functioning, structures in the city of Porto. The municipal council tried to appropriate the water from this fountain, ordering the inscription in granite: "A água desta Fonte é somente da Sidade" (The water of this fountain is solely of the city).

With the opening-up of the Rua Nova da Alfândega around 1871, the fountain began to exist under the level of the road, and almost lost in a corner of the buildings. This was done to facilitate the access to building and new customhouse in Porto.

In 1940, there were efforts by the municipality of Porto to restore and recuperate the fountain.

== Architecture ==
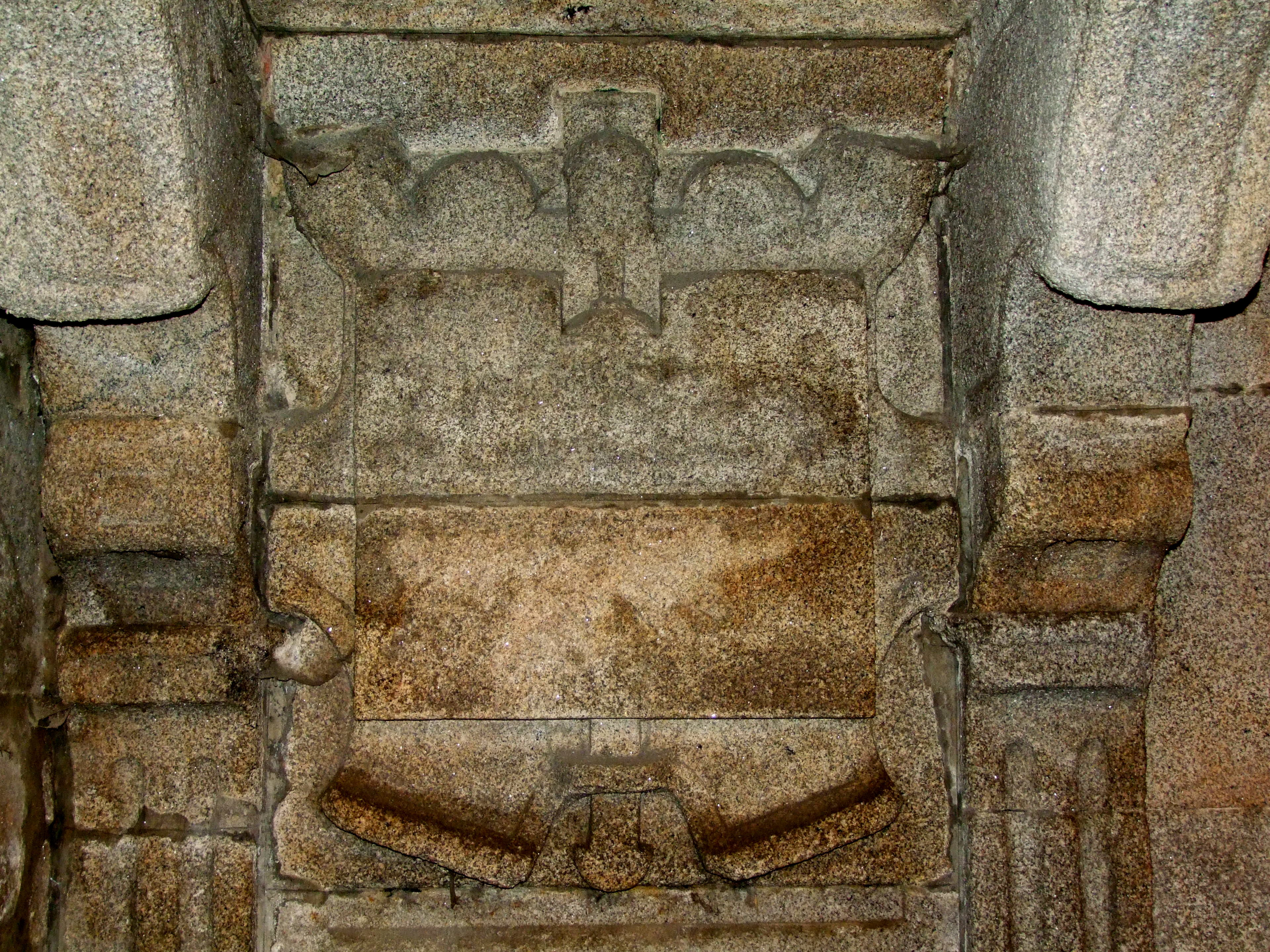
Sculpted detail below the veranda

The fountain abuts the main floor of a residence, underneath a verandah, which also doubled as covering/awning. It is alongside the western wall of the Largo da Alfândega and oriented towards the support wall of the Rua Nova da Alfândega.

On either side of the fountain are two ribbed pilasters that extend into the corbels of the veranda. Between these pilasters are five granite slabs, with the iron waterspout located in the second slab. Another exit point is along the pavement in granite, which takes the form of a small semi-circular pillar. The pavement of the fountain, in granite, is relative to the Rua de Miragaia, three steps above the fountain.

Between the corbels, and below the veranda, is an inscription slab, with the words "Loubado seja o Santíssimo Sacramento e a Puríssima Conceição da Virgem Nossa Senhora, concebida sem pecado original - 1629" (Exalted is the Holy Sacrament and Pure Conception of the Our Virgin Lady, conceived without original sin (1629)).
