= SS Lazio =

Association football club in Italy

Lazio
- Full name: Società Sportiva Lazio S.p.A.
- Nicknames: I Biancocelesti (The White and Sky Blues); I Biancazzurri (The White and Blues); Le Aquile (The Eagles); Gli Aquilotti (The Young Eagles)
- Founded: 9 January 1900; 126 years ago, as Società Podistica Lazio
- Stadium: Stadio Olimpico
- Capacity: 70,634
- Owner: Lazio Events S.r.l.
- President: Claudio Lotito
- Head coach: Gennaro Gattuso
- League: Serie A
- 2025–26: Serie A, 9th of 20
- Website: www.sslazio.it
Home colours	Away colours	Third colours

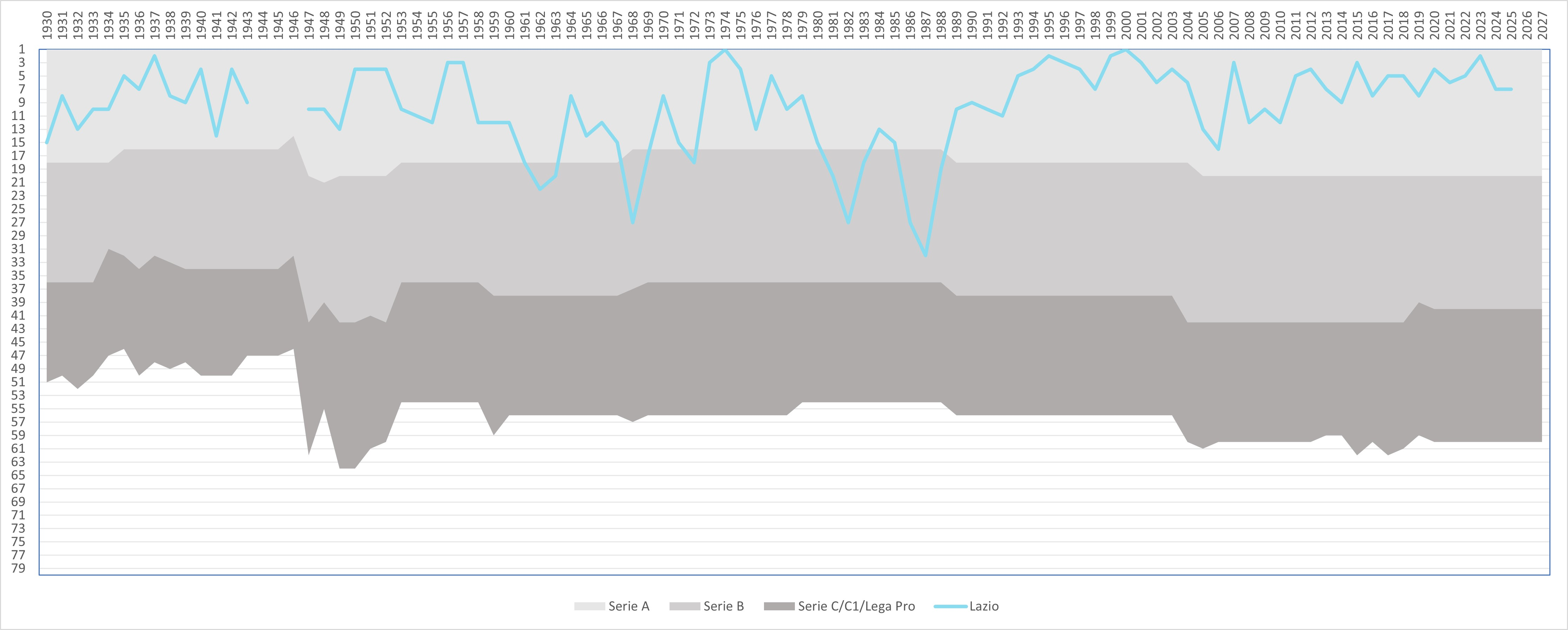
The performance of Lazio in the Italian football league structure since the first season of a unified Serie A (1929–30)

Società Sportiva Lazio (Italian pronunciation: [sotʃeˈta sporˈtiːva ˈlattsjo]; BIT: SSL; Lazio Sport Club), commonly known as SS Lazio or simply Lazio, is an Italian professional sports club based in Rome, most known for its football activity. Founded in 1900, the club plays in the Serie A and has spent most of its history in the top tier of Italian football. Lazio were Italian champions in 1974 and 2000. They have won the Coppa Italia seven times, the Supercoppa Italiana five times, and both the UEFA Cup Winners' Cup and UEFA Super Cup on one occasion. They also won the 1968–69 Serie B. Lazio share the 70,634 capacity Stadio Olimpico with Roma.

The club's earliest major honour was a domestic cup win in 1958. In 1974, they won their first Serie A title. The 1990s were the most successful period in Lazio's history: they reached the UEFA Cup final in 1998; won the UEFA Cup Winners' Cup and UEFA Super Cup in 1999; and clinched the Serie A title in 2000. Due to a severe economic crisis in 2002 that forced the departure of president Sergio Cragnotti and the selling of several star players, Lazio's success in the league declined. In spite of the lower funds, the club has won four Coppa Italia titles since then: 2004, 2009, 2013 and 2019. Current president Claudio Lotito took charge of the club in 2004 following a two-year vacancy in the position.

Lazio's traditional kit colours are sky blue shirts and white shorts with white socks; these reflect Rome's ancient Hellenic legacy. Sky blue socks have also been interchangeably used as home colours. Lazio share a long-standing and fierce rivalry with Roma, against whom they have contested the Derby della Capitale ("Derby of the capital city") since 1929.

Despite initially not having any parent–subsidiary relation with the male and female professional team (that was incorporated as S.S. Lazio S.p.A.), the founding of Società Sportiva Lazio allowed the club to participate in over 40 different sports disciplines in total.

== History ==
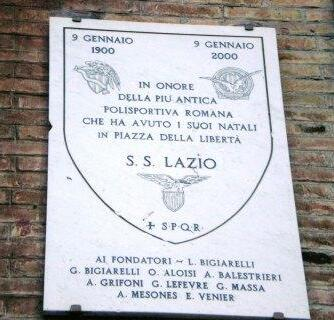
Plaque commemorating the foundation of Lazio at Piazza della Libertà (Roma, Prati)

Società Podistica Lazio was founded on 9 January 1900 in the Prati district of Rome. Until 1910, the club played at an amateur level until it officially joined the league competition in 1912 as soon as the Italian Football Federation began organising championships in the center and south of Italy, and reached the final of the national championship playoff three times, but never won, losing in 1913 to Pro Vercelli, in 1914 to Casale and in 1923 to Genoa 1893. In 1927, Lazio was the only major Roman club which resisted the Fascist regime's attempts to merge all the city's teams into what would become Roma the same year. The club played in the first organised Serie A in 1929 and, led by legendary Italian striker Silvio Piola, achieved a second-place finish in 1937 – its highest pre-war result.

The 1950s produced a mix of mid and upper table results, with a Coppa Italia win in 1958. Lazio was relegated for the first time in 1961 to Serie B, but returned in the top flight two years later. After a number of mid-table placements, another relegation followed in 1970–71. Back to Serie A in 1972–73, Lazio immediately emerged as surprise challengers for the Scudetto to Milan and Juventus in 1972–73, only losing out on the final day of the season, with a team comprising captain Giuseppe Wilson, as well as midfielders Luciano Re Cecconi and Mario Frustalupi, striker Giorgio Chinaglia, and head coach Tommaso Maestrelli. Lazio improved such successes the following season, ensuring its first title in 1973–74. However, tragic deaths of Re Cecconi and Scudetto trainer Maestrelli, as well as the departure of Chinaglia, would be a triple blow for Lazio. The emergence of Bruno Giordano during this period provided some as he finished League top scorer in 1979, when Lazio finished eighth.

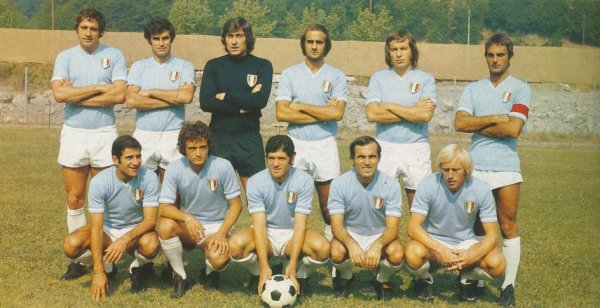
SS Lazio team which won the club's first scudetto in 1974

Lazio were forcibly relegated to Serie B in 1980, due to a remarkable scandal concerning illegal bets on their own matches, along with Milan. They remained in Italy's second division for three seasons, in what would mark the darkest period in Lazio's history. They would return in 1983 and manage a last-day escape from relegation the following season. The 1984–85 season would prove harrowing, with a pitiful 15 points and bottom place finish.

In 1986, Lazio was hit with a nine-point deduction (a true back in the day of the two-point win) for a betting scandal involving player Claudio Vinazzani. An epic struggle against relegation followed the same season in Serie B, with the club led by trainer Eugenio Fascetti only avoiding relegation to the Serie C after play-off wins over Taranto and Campobasso. This would prove a turning point in the club's history, with Lazio returning to Serie A in 1988 and, under the careful financial management of Gianmarco Calleri, the consolidation of the club's position as a solid top-flight club.

Bruno Giordano with the Lazio jersey

The arrival of Sergio Cragnotti in 1992 changed the club's history, due to his long-term investments in new players to make the team a Scudetto competitor. A notable early transfer during his tenure was the capture of English midfielder Paul Gascoigne from Tottenham Hotspur for £5.5 million. Gascoigne's transfer to Lazio is credited with the increase of interest in Serie A in the United Kingdom during the 1990s. Cragnotti repeatedly broke transfer records in pursuit of players who were considered major stars – Juan Sebastián Verón for £18 million, Christian Vieri for £19 million and breaking the world transfer record, albeit only for a matter of weeks, to sign Hernán Crespo from Parma for £35 million.

Lazio were Serie A third in 1995 and 1996, and fourth in 1997, then losing the championship just by one point to Milan on the last championship's match in 1999 before, with the likes of Siniša Mihajlović, Alessandro Nesta, Marcelo Salas and Pavel Nedvěd in the side, winning its second Scudetto in 2000, as well as the Coppa Italia double with Sven-Göran Eriksson (1997–2001) as manager.

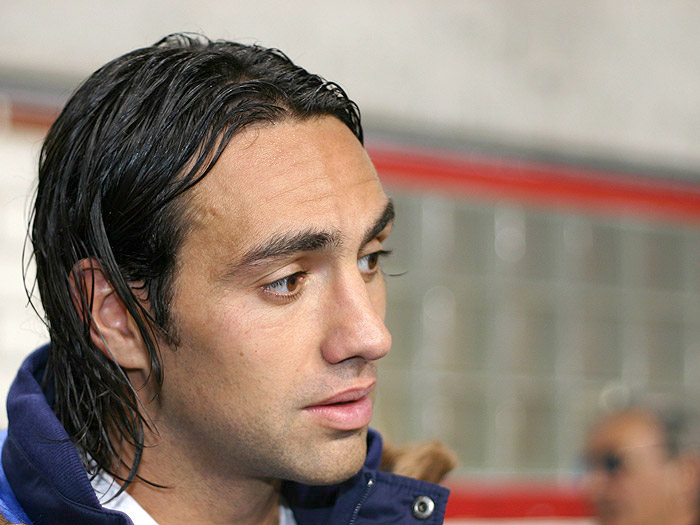
Alessandro Nesta, homegrown player and captain of Lazio 1999–2002

Lazio had two more Coppa Italia triumphs in 1998 and 2004, as well as the last UEFA Cup Winners' Cup in 1999. They also reached the UEFA Cup final, but lost 0–3 against Internazionale. In addition, Lazio won the Supercoppa Italiana twice and defeated Manchester United in 1999 to win the UEFA Super Cup. In 2000, Lazio became also the first Italian football club to be quoted on the Italian Piazza Affari stock market.

With money running out, Lazio's results slowly worsened in the years. In 2002, a financial scandal involving Cragnotti and his food products multinational Cirio forced him to leave the club, and Lazio was controlled until 2004 by caretaker financial managers and a bank pool. This forced the club to sell their star players and even fan favourite captain Alessandro Nesta. In 2004, entrepreneur Claudio Lotito acquired the majority of the club. In 2006, the club qualified to the 2006–07 UEFA Cup under coach Delio Rossi. The club, however, was excluded from European competitions due to their involvement in the 2006 Italian football scandal.

In the 2006–07 season, despite a later-reduced points deduction, Lazio achieved a third-place finish, thus gaining qualification to the UEFA Champions League third qualifying round, where they defeated Dinamo București to reach the group phase, and ended fourth place in the group composed of Real Madrid, Werder Bremen and Olympiacos. Things in the league did not go much better, with the team spending most of the season in the bottom half of the table, sparking the protests of the fans, and eventually ending the Serie A season in 12th place. In the 2008–09 season, Lazio won their fifth Coppa Italia, beating Sampdoria in the final.

Lazio started the 2009–10 season playing the Supercoppa Italiana against Inter in Beijing and winning the match 2–1, with goals from Matuzalém and Tommaso Rocchi.

Lazio won the 2012–13 Coppa Italia 1–0 over rivals Roma, with the lone goal coming from Senad Lulić in the 71st minute.

Lazio won the 2018–19 Coppa Italia 2–0 over Atalanta, winning their seventh title overall. Sergej Milinkovic-Savic (82') and Joaquin Correa (90') were the goalscorers in this match.

Lazio won the 2019 Supercoppa Italiana 3–1 over Juventus in Riyadh, Saudi Arabia, winning their fifth title overall. Luis Alberto (16'), Senad Lulic (73'), and Danilo Cataldi (90+4') were the goalscorers for Lazio, while Paulo Dybala (45') was the lone goalscorer for Juventus.

In the 2024-25 UEFA Europa League group stage, Lazio topped the 36-club table with 19 points. They reached the quarter-finals of the competition after defeating Viktoria Plzen 3–2 on aggregate in the round of 16.

== Colours, badge and nicknames ==
First kit ever worn by the club

Lazio's colours of white and sky blue were inspired by the national emblem of Greece, due to the fact that Lazio is a mixed sports club; this was chosen in recognition of the fact that the Ancient Olympic Games and along with it the sporting tradition in Europe is linked to Greece.

Originally, Lazio wore a shirt which was divided into white and sky blue quarters, with black shorts and socks. After a while of wearing a plain white shirt very early on, Lazio reverted to the colours which they wear today. Some seasons Lazio have used a sky blue and white shirt with stripes, but usually it is sky blue with a white trim, with the white shorts and socks. The club's colours have led to their Italian nickname of Biancocelesti.

Lazio's traditional club badge and symbol is the eagle, which was chosen by founding member Luigi Bigiarelli. A symbol of the Roman legions and emperor, it was chosen to represent power and victory; it also identifies the club with its origin city. Lazio's use of the symbol has led to two of their nicknames; le Aquile ("the Eagles") and gli Aquilotti ("the Young Eagles"). The current club badge features a golden eagle above a white shield with a blue border; inside the shield is the club's name and a smaller tripartite shield with the colours of the club.

=== Kit suppliers and shirt sponsors ===
Period	Kit manufacturer	Main shirt sponsor	Alternate shirt sponsor	Secondary shirt sponsor	Shirt sponsor (back)	Shirt sponsor (sleeve)
1946–1961	Gradella Sport	None	None	None		None
1961–1962	Lacoste	None	None	None		None
1962–1963	Gradella Sport	None	None	None		None
1963–1964	Lacoste	None	None	None		None
1964–1969	Gradella Sport	None	None	None		None
1969–1970	Tuttosport; Umbro	None	None	None		None
1970–1971	Umbro	None	None	None		None
1971–1978	Tuttosport; NR (Ennerre)	None	None	None		None
1978–1979	NR (Ennerre)	None	None	None		None
1979–1980	NR (Ennerre); Pouchain	None	None	None		None
1980–1981	Adidas; NR (Ennerre)	None	None	None		None
1981–1982	Adidas	Tonini	None	None		None
1982–1984	NR (Ennerre)	Sèleco	None	None		None
1984–1986	NR (Ennerre)	Castor Eletttrodomestici	None	None		None
1986–1987	Tuttosport	Cassa di Risparmio di Roma	None	None		None
1987–1989	Kappa	Cassa di Risparmio di Roma	None	None		None
1989–1991	Umbro	Cassa di Risparmio di Roma	None	None		None
1991–1992	Umbro	Banco di Santo Spirito	None	None		None
1992–1996	Umbro	Banca di Roma	None	None		None
1997–1998	Umbro	Cirio	None	None		None
1998–1999	Puma	Cirio	Del Monte Foods (in UEFA matches)	None		None
1999–2000	Puma	Cirio	Stream TV (in cup matches) / Del Monte Foods (in UEFA matches)	None		None
2000–2002	Puma	Siemens Mobile	None	None		None
2002–2003	Puma	Siemens Mobile	Cotonella (in cup matches) / Compex (in cup matches)	None		None
2003–2004	Puma	Parmacotto	Indesit (in cup & UEFA matches)	None		None
2004–2005	Puma	Parmacotto	Errebian (in Supercup)	None		None
2005–2007	Puma	INA Assitalia	None	None		None
2007–2008	Puma	None	So.Spe. (Matchday 2, 7, 8, 10–11, 15–19, 21–24, 26 & 28-30 & cup matches) / Edileuropa (25, 27, 29–31, & 34–38)	None		None
2008–2009	Puma	None	Pro Evolution Soccer 2009 (Matchday 15) / Cucciolone (16 & 18) / Groupama (31)	None		None
2009–2010	Puma	Edileuropa	Clinica Paideia (Matchday 4 & 12) / Regione Lazio (in Supercup matches)	None		None
2010–2011	Puma	None	Clinica Paideia (Matchday 12 & 37)	None		None
2011–2012	Puma	None	Clinica Paideia (Matchday 7 & 11)	None		None
2012–2013	Macron	None	Clinica Paideia (Matchday 17–18)	None		None
2013–2014	Macron	None	Lazio Style Channel (Matchday 10, 19 & 24) / Clinica Paideia (23)	None		None
2014–2015	Macron	None	Clinica Paideia (Matchday 2, 8, 12 & 19) / Associazione italiana contro le leucemie-linfomi e mieloma (13)	None		None
2015–2016	Macron	None	Extraordinary Jubilee of Mercy (Matchday 15) / Clinica Paideia (30, 34 & 36)	None		None
2016–2017	Macron	Sèleco	Clinica Paideia (Matchday 15) / Libera (30)	None		None
2017–2018	Macron	Sèleco	None	Clinica Paideia (Matchday 14 & 19)	Sèleco Easy Life	None
2018–2019	Macron	Marathonbet	None	None	Sèleco / Igea Banca (in Coppa Italia Final)	Clinica Paideia (Matchday 21 & 26)
2019–2020	Macron	None	Regione Lazio (in Supercup matches)	None	None	Clinica Paideia (Matchday 2 & 15) / Frecciarossa (Matchday 27–38)
2020–2021	Macron	None	World Food Programme (Matchday 13) / Contrader (31) / Clinica Paideia (37)	None	Contrader	Frecciarossa
2021–2022	Macron	Binance	None	None	Clinica Paideia (Matchday 6 & 34)	Frecciarossa
2022–2023	Mizuno	Binance	None	None	Clinica Paideia (Matchday 27)	AIRFire (Matchday 19–38)
2023–2024	Mizuno	None	Clinica Paideia (Matchday 16, 30 & 33) / Regione Lazio (in Supercup matches)	None	None	AeroItalia
2024–2025	Mizuno	None	Casa di Cura Villa Mafalda (Matchday 36) / AeroItalia (Matchday 37)	None	AeroItalia (except Matchday 37)	None
2025–2026	Mizuno	Polymarket (since Matchday 33)	AeroItalia (Cup Semi-finals 2nd leg)	None	Polymarket (Cup Semi-finals 2nd leg) / Casa di Cura Villa Mafalda (Matchday 36 & 37)	Fantacalcio Legends Pedro (Matchday 38)

== Stadium ==
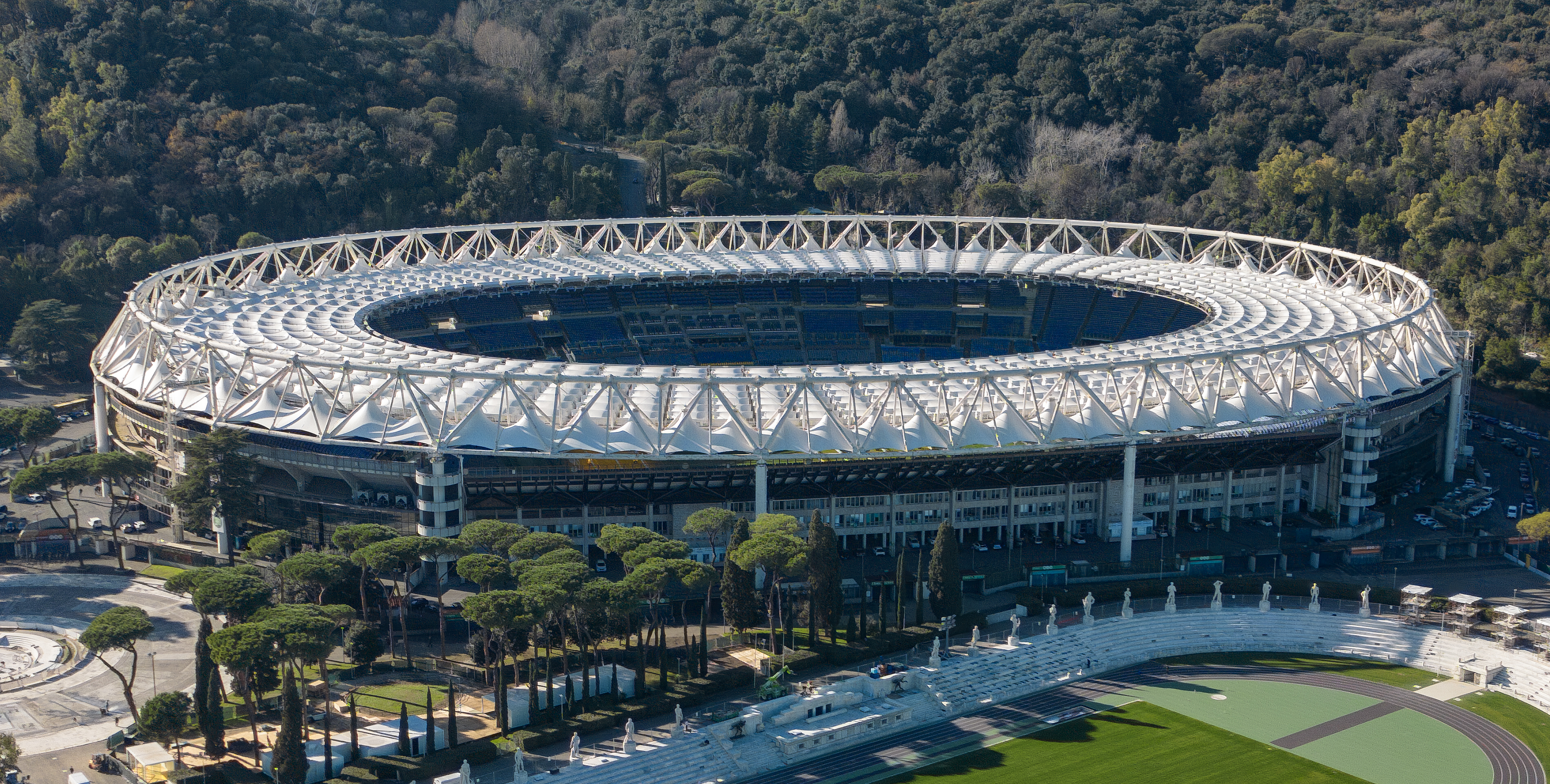
Stadio Olimpico

Stadio Olimpico, located on the Foro Italico, is the major stadium of Rome. It is the home of the Italy national football team as well as of both local teams Lazio and Roma. It was opened in 1937 and after its latest renovation in 2008, the stadium has a capacity of 70,634 seats. It was the site of the 1960 Summer Olympics, but has also served as the location of the 1987 World Athletics Championships, the 1980 European Championship final, the 1990 World Cup and the Champions League Final in 1996 and 2009.

Also on the Foro Italico lies the Stadio dei Marmi, or "marble stadium", which was built in 1932 and designed by Enrico Del Debbio. It has tiers topped by 60 white marble statues that were gifts from Italian cities in commemoration of 60 athletes.

During the 1989–90 season, Lazio and Roma played their games at the Stadio Flaminio of Rome, located in the district Flaminio, because of the renovation works carried out at the Stadio Olimpico.

In June 2018, Lazio President Claudio Lotito stated that the Biancocelesti "should be granted the same favour and treatment as Roma – the ability to also build a new stadium. He also added that "Lazio's stadium will be built before Roma's stadium." In June 2019, Lotito was set to present the designs of a potential future stadium for Lazio, named the Stadio delle Aquile. However, this did not occur for reasons unknown, and in July 2021, Lotito pivoted from the creation of the Stadio delle Aquile to the idea of moving the club's home to a renovated Stadio Flaminio.

In October 2022, Lotito provided an update on his Stadio Flaminio project, stating that he is "very attached" to the hope that Lazio will play there again, as having it as their home is "something that evokes our history and our roots." In November 2022, Lotito discussed his plans for the Stadio Flaminio at the 'Sing a Song' charity event at the Auditorium della Conciliazione in Rome. He stated that he "would like to increase the stadium from a capacity of around 18,000 to 45,000" and that "it is a problem" for Lazio to "remain without a stadium of their own."

In September 2024, Lazio made concrete steps in their plans to own and renovate the Stadio Flaminio. The club were looking to team up with a famous company named "Legend" that specializes in building and maintaining sports venues - they would then become the project manager and take care of the ticketing service, merchandising management, retail sales and the search to find a naming sponsor; with Emirates reportedly interested in the project. The total cost of the operation was said to be between €250 and €300 million.

In December 2024, Lotito and his collaborators held a meeting with Mayor Roberto Gualtieri and Councilor Alessandro Onorato at the Municipality of Rome in Campidoglio to present their project for the new Stadio Flaminio. He envisioned developing a state-of-the-art stadium with a capacity of 40,000 to 50,000 spectators and a retractable roof; he also outlined plans for the comprehensive redevelopment of the surrounding Flaminio district. He stated that the project was well-received, while revealing that acquiring the necessary paperwork could require another three years. However, shortly after, "Roma Nuoto" received approval from the Conference of Services after threatening legal action following the long and unjustified delay in the process for their plans for the abandoned stadium; they envision a multi-sport facility for the future of the Stadio Flaminio, including an Olympic-sized swimming pool, padel courts, and a hockey rink, thus competing with Lazio.

In March 2025, Lotito officially deposited his proposal for the currently-defunct Stadio Flaminio to the Municipality of Rome to become Lazio's new home. The Biancocelesti will be looking to finalize the bureaucratic procedures by the start of 2026 and are aiming to finish the renovation work by the summer of 2029. There will be 50,750 seats, and renovating this ground - and the surrounding area - will cost them circa €438 million, as per Calcio e Finanza.

In April 2025, the "Roma Nuoto" project for the Stadio Flaminio was turned down by the Municipality Council of Rome, after they unanimously deemed it ill-suited for the venue's purpose, which is hosting domestic and international events within a large stadium. The doomed project sought to reduce the stadium capacity from 42,000 to just 7,500, which would have diminished the value of the stadium according to the Municipality Council.

== Supporters and rivalries ==
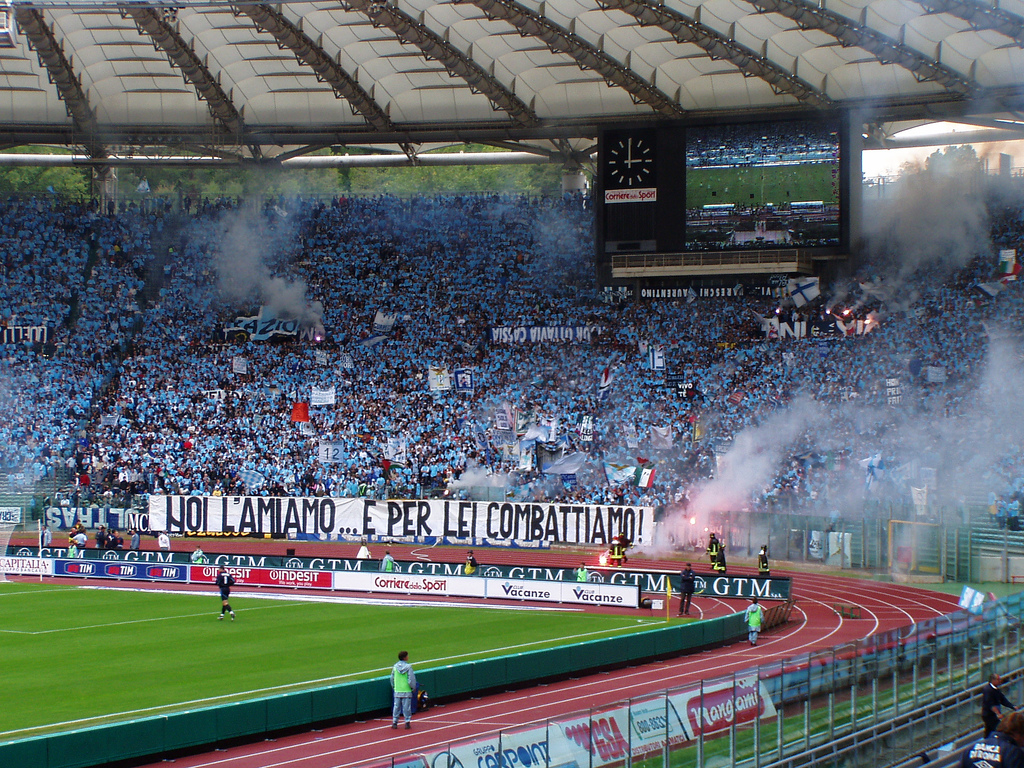
SS Lazio fans in the Curva Nord of the Stadio Olimpico

Lazio is the sixth-most supported football club in Italy and the second-most in Rome; in August 2008 La Repubblica reported that around 2% of Italian football fans supported the club. Historically, the largest section of Lazio supporters in the city of Rome has come from the far northern section, creating an arch-like shape across Rome with affluent areas such as Parioli, Prati, Flaminio, Cassia and Monte Mario.

Founded in 1987, Irriducibili Lazio was the club's biggest ultras group for over 30 years. Its members typically created traditional Italian ultra displays during the Derby della Capitale (Rome Derby), the match between Lazio and their main rivals, Roma. It is amongst the most heated and emotional footballing rivalries in the world, and fan behaviour can result in injury or even death, such as an incident during the 1979–80 season; Lazio fan Vincenzo Paparelli was killed at one of the derby games after being hit in the eye by a distress rocket that was launched by a Roma fan and flew from one end of the stadium to the other. Lazio also have a strong rivalry with Napoli and Livorno, as well as with Pescara and Atalanta. The club also maintains strong competitive rivalries with Fiorentina, Juventus and AC Milan.

Conversely, the ultras have friendly relationships with Inter Milan, Triestina and Hellas Verona. Internationally, Lazio's fans maintain a long-standing strong friendship with the supporters of the Bulgarian club Levski Sofia and as such, Lazio were invited to participate in the 2014 centenary football match honouring the founding of the Bulgarian club.

=== Far-right politics and Irriducibili ultras ===
Dubbed "the most right-wing football club in Europe" by author James Montague, SS Lazio has a supporter culture that has been associated with far‑right politics, nationalism and extremist behaviour over several decades; critics have sometimes referred to the club as "SS Nazio".

In the early years of Italian organised supporter culture, before the emergence of modern ultras, Lazio's fanbase included a range of political orientations. In the 1960s and early 1970s, Italian ultra culture began to develop around the country, and groups of supporters at Lazio and other clubs formed with varying ideologies. Lazio had groups such as the Viking among its early supporters in this period.

A marked shift occurred in 1972 with the formation of the Irriducibili, a group that would become the dominant ultra faction within the Curva Nord, the section of Lazio's home ground, the Stadio Olimpico, where the most vocal supporters stand. Over the 1980s and 1990s, the Irriducibili became increasingly prominent, establishing a reputation for organised displays, coordinated chants and intense loyalty to the club, and also for integrating far‑right political symbolism into their activities. In 1987 Fabrizio Piscitelli, known as Diabolik, became a leading figure within the Irriducibili and helped consolidate their influence among Lazio's hardcore supporters.

During the 1990s, the Irriducibili were noted for violent behaviour on and off the terraces, and for the use of fascist salutes, racially abusive chants and antisemitic banners. Incidents attributed to sections of the Lazio support in this era included monkey chants directed at Black players and banners referencing figures such as Serbian paramilitary commander Željko Ražnatović with slogans such as "Honour to the Tiger, Arkan". In 1998, Lazio supporters displayed an openly anti‑Semitic banner during the Derby della Capitale against Roma, reading "Auschwitz is your country, the gas chambers are your home"; in 2000, another banner taunted Roma fans by calling them "Squad of Blacks, terrace of Jews".

Paolo Di Canio, a player associated with Lazio in the mid‑2000s, contributed to the public perception of the club's right‑wing support. In October 2005, he performed a straight‑arm salute, understood as a fascist gesture, to Lazio fans during a derby against Roma; he was fined and suspended by Italian authorities for the act. Di Canio has described himself at times as a fascist in personal statements and written favourably about Benito Mussolini in his autobiography.

In the 2000s and 2010s, Lazio's supporter culture continued to attract controversy. On 3 February 2016, a Serie A match between Lazio and Napoli at the Stadio Olimpico was temporarily halted in the 68th minute after Lazio supporters directed racist abuse, including monkey chants, at Napoli defender Kalidou Koulibaly, alongside anti-Neapolitan chants. Play resumed after three minutes, and Napoli won 2-0, with referee Massimiliano Irrati's decision to stop the game praised by Napoli manager Maurizio Sarri but questioned by Lazio coach Stefano Pioli, who described the chanting as coming from a minority and denied it was racist. In 2017, images of Anne Frank in an Roma shirt were displayed by Lazio ultras at the Olimpico, occurring shortly after racial abuse had resulted in parts of the stadium being closed and sanctions being applied.

Fabrizio Piscitelli's leadership of the Irriducibili continued until he was shot dead in Rome in 2019; reports suggest he was involved in organised crime circles. Following his death, the Irriducibili formally disbanded, but elements of far‑right supporter identity persisted among sections of the fanbase.

In 2021, the club signed Romano Floriani Mussolini, great‑grandson of the Fascist dictator Benito Mussolini, to its youth ranks; this event was widely reported internationally and underscored external perceptions of the club's historical associations, though Lazio officials emphasised sporting merit in the decision.

Incidents involving Lazio supporters continued into the 2020s, and Italian football authorities as well as UEFA have repeatedly sanctioned Lazio for supporter behaviour. In 2020, Lazio were fined by UEFA for racist behaviour and fascist salutes by fans during a Europa League match; the club sought to identify and penalise individuals implicated in the conduct. On 4 April 2023, Lazio were given a suspended one-match partial stadium closure after antisemitic chants were directed at Roma supporters by fans in the Curva Nord during the Derby della Capitale on 19 March 2023. The sanction was suspended for one year after Lazio issued three lifetime bans to individuals involved, including one supporter wearing a shirt referencing Adolf Hitler and two others performing Roman salutes, with the penalty to be enforced if further incidents occurred.

In January 2024, the Curva Nord was subject to closure for matches following racist chanting directed at players, including a high‑profile incident involving Romelu Lukaku. In March 2024, around 100 Lazio fans were reported to have raised fascist slogans, cheered for Mussolini and performed Roman salutes in a Munich beer hall before a Champions League fixture. In November 2024, city authorities in Amsterdam banned Lazio fans from attending a Europa League match, citing concerns about extremist, racist and anti‑Semitic expressions, referencing past behaviour including fascist salutes and Nazi symbolism. In January 2025, reports emerged of suspected Lazio ultras attacking visiting Real Sociedad supporters in Rome, resulting in multiple injuries and prompting condemnation from local officials and investigations by police; authorities characterised some of the suspected assailants as far‑right extremists.

Thomas Hitzlsperger, a retired German footballer who played for Lazio in 2010, related in his autobiography, Mutproben, that the far-right and fascist fans in Lazio were part of his decision to leave the club less than six months after joining the team. He added that being gay made it difficult for him to adapt to Lazio.

=== Non-ultra Lazio fans ===
Given the controversial incidents involving Lazio ultras, non-ultra Lazio fans have distanced themselves from the ideology and behaviour of the ultras on several occasions. Furthermore, since the beginning of the 2020s several fan clubs that openly take anti-racist and anti-discriminatory stances have been founded, pointing out the difference between the Lazio ultras and a large portion of the rest of the fanbase. Initiatives have been organised to emphasise there is a different way of supporting the club. An example of such an action was the banner that was unfolded in the Distinti Sud-Est section of the stadium during a Lazio-Empoli game that read: "La Lazio non è razzista, la Lazio è libertà" ("Lazio is not racist, Lazio is liberty"), emphasising the discrepancy between some of the ultras and other Lazio fans. On at least one occasion, a member of one of these Lazio fan groups was attacked by neo-fascist ultras.

== Honours ==
=== Domestic ===
- Serie A
  - Winners (2): 1973–74, 1999–2000
  - Runners-up (7): 1912–13, 1913–14, 1922–23, 1936–37, 1994–95, 1998–99, 2022–23
- Serie B
  - Winners (1): 1968–69
- Coppa Italia
  - Winners (7): 1958, 1997–98, 1999–2000, 2003–04, 2008–09, 2012–13, 2018–19
  - Runners-up (4): 1960–61, 2014–15, 2016–17, 2025–26
- Supercoppa Italiana
  - Winners (5): 1998, 2000, 2009, 2017, 2019
  - Runners-up (3): 2004, 2013, 2015

=== Continental ===
- UEFA Cup Winners' Cup
  - Winners (1): 1998–99
- UEFA Super Cup
  - Winners (1): 1999

== Players ==
=== Current squad ===
As of 28 September 2026

Note: Flags indicate national team as defined under FIFA eligibility rules; some limited exceptions apply. Players may hold more than one non-FIFA nationality.

No.	Pos.	Nation	Player
2	DF	POR	Diogo Leite
3	DF	ITA	Luca Pellegrini
5	DF	NED	Danilho Doekhi
6	MF	ITA	Nicolò Rovella
7	MF	NGR	Fisayo Dele-Bashiru
8	MF	ESP	Bruno Galassi
9	FW	ITA	Andrea Pinamonti
10	MF	ITA	Mattia Zaccagni (captain)
11	FW	DEN	Gustav Isaksen
14	FW	NED	Tijjani Noslin
15	DF	ITA	Romano Floriani Mussolini
16	MF	ITA	Davide Frattesi (on loan from Inter Milan)
17	DF	POR	Nuno Tavares
21	MF	MAR	Reda Belahyane
22	FW	ITA	Matteo Cancellieri
23	DF	ESP	Alfonso Pedraza

No.	Pos.	Nation	Player
24	MF	NED	Kenneth Taylor
25	DF	DEN	Oliver Provstgaard
28	MF	POL	Adrian Przyborek
29	MF	ITA	Manuel Lazzari
32	MF	ITA	Danilo Cataldi
35	GK	GRE	Christos Mandas
37	DF	CRO	Josip Šutalo (on loan from Ajax)
40	GK	ITA	Edoardo Motta
55	GK	ITA	Alessio Furlanetto
59	GK	ITA	Davide Renzetti
63	FW	ITA	Federico Serra
71	MF	ITA	Valerio Farcomeni
76	DF	BRA	Filipe Bordon
77	DF	MNE	Adam Marušić (vice-captain)
80	FW	ISL	Albert Guðmundsson (on loan from Fiorentina)

=== Primavera ===
As of 2 September 2026

Note: Flags indicate national team as defined under FIFA eligibility rules; some limited exceptions apply. Players may hold more than one non-FIFA nationality.

No.	Pos.	Nation	Player
33	DF	BRA	Ricardo Bordon

=== Other players under contract ===
As of 2 September 2026

Note: Flags indicate national team as defined under FIFA eligibility rules; some limited exceptions apply. Players may hold more than one non-FIFA nationality.

No.	Pos.	Nation	Player
—	DF	ALG	Mohamed Farès
—	MF	ITA	Leonardo Di Tommaso

=== Out on loan ===
As of 2 September 2026

Note: Flags indicate national team as defined under FIFA eligibility rules; some limited exceptions apply. Players may hold more than one non-FIFA nationality.

No.	Pos.	Nation	Player
—	MF	ITA	Pietro Pinelli (at Carrarese until 30 June 2027)
—	FW	SEN	Boulaye Dia (at Rennes until 30 June 2027)

No.	Pos.	Nation	Player
—	FW	GBS	Saná Fernandes (at Juve Stabia until 30 June 2027)
—	FW	SRB	Petar Ratkov (at Levante until 30 June 2027)

=== Retired numbers ===
12 – Since the 2003–04 season, the Curva Nord of Stadio Olimpico, as a sign of recognition, is considered the 12th man on the pitch.

== Club officials ==
=== Board of directors ===
Role	Name
Owner	(Italy) Claudio Lotito (66.70%)
President	(Italy) Claudio Lotito
CEO	(Italy) Marco Cavaliere
Counselor	(Italy) Marco Moschini
Judicial Department	(Italy) Francesca Miele
Secretary	(Italy) Armando Calveri
Chief Scout	(Italy) Giancarlo Romainore
Sporting Director	(Italy) Angelo Fabiani
Supporter Liaison Officer	(Italy) Giampiero Angelici
Team Manager	(Germany) Stefan Derkum
Head of Youth Development	(Italy) Enrico Lotito
Youth Center Coordinator	(Italy) Fabrizio Fratini
Medical Director	(Italy) Ivo Pulcini
Medical Coordinator	(Italy) Fabio Rodia
Ticketing Director	(Italy) Angelo Cragnotti
Responsibles for Order and Safety	(Italy) Alessandro Bracci
Administrator	(Italy) Giovanni Russo
Marketing & Sales Director	(Italy) Marco Canigiani

- Last updated: 11 June 2024

=== Current technical staff ===
Role	Name
Head coach	(Italy) Gennaro Gattuso
Assistant coach	(Italy) Giovanni Martusciello
Technical coaches	(Italy) Marco Ianni (Italy) Giammarco Fedeli
Goalkeeping coaches	(Italy) Cristiano Viotti (Italy) Massimo Nenci
Athletic coaches	(Italy) Simone Fugalli (Italy) Davide Losi (Italy) Davide Ranzato
Match analyst	(Italy) Gianni Picchioni
Kit men	(Italy) Stefano Delle Grotti (Italy) Mauro Patrizi (Italy) Walter Pela
Club doctor	(Italy) Italo Leo
Rehab coach	(Italy) Giuseppe Malizia
Physiotherapists	(Italy) Christian Marsella (Italy) Daniele Misseri (Italy) Glauco Bucci (Italy) Gianni Scapini (Italy) Luigi Iachetti

- Last updated: 1 July 2025

== Notable managers ==
The following managers have all won at least one trophy when in charge of Lazio:

Name	Period	Trophies
(Italy) Fulvio Bernardini	1958–1960	Coppa Italia
(Argentina) Juan Carlos Lorenzo	1968–1971	Serie B
(Italy) Tommaso Maestrelli	1971–1976	Serie A
(Sweden) Sven-Göran Eriksson	1997–2001	2 Coppa Italia, 2 Supercoppa Italiana, Serie A, UEFA Cup Winners' Cup, UEFA Super Cup
(Italy) Roberto Mancini	2002–2004	Coppa Italia
(Italy) Delio Rossi	2005–2009	Coppa Italia
(Italy) Davide Ballardini	2009–2010	Supercoppa Italiana
(Bosnia and Herzegovina) Vladimir Petković	2012–2014	Coppa Italia
(Italy) Simone Inzaghi	2016–2021	2 Supercoppa Italiana, Coppa Italia

== Statistics and records ==
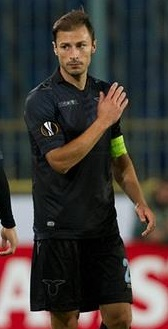
Ștefan Radu, Lazio's all-time appearance holder

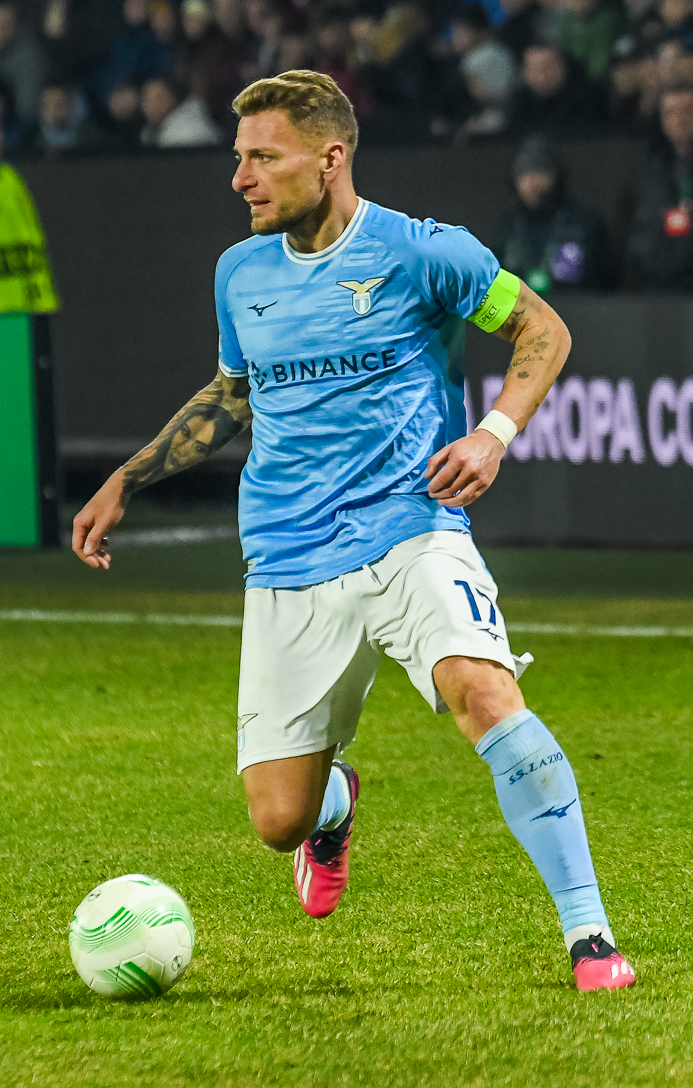
Ciro Immobile, Lazio's top goalscorer

Ștefan Radu holds Lazio's official appearance record, having played 416 appearances. The record for total appearances by a goalkeeper is held by Luca Marchegiani, with 339 appearances, while the record for most league appearances is held by Aldo Puccinelli with 339.

The all-time leading goalscorer for Lazio is Ciro Immobile, with 206 goals scored, followed by Silvio Piola with 159 goals. Piola, who played also with Pro Vercelli, Torino, Juventus and Novara, is also the highest goalscorer in Serie A history, with 274 goals. Immobile is also the all-time top goalscorer in European competitions, with 26 goals.

Officially, Lazio's highest home attendance is approximately 80,000 for a Serie A match against Foggia on 12 May 1974, the match that awarded to Lazio their first Scudetto. This is also the record for the Stadio Olimpico, including matches held by Roma and the Italy national football team.

== Società Sportiva Lazio as a company ==
In 1998, during Sergio Cragnotti's period in charge as the chairman, Società Sportiva Lazio S.p.A. became a listed company: Lazio were the first Italian club to do so. However, Cragnotti resigned as chairman in 2001, after a "huge hole in the budget" of the club.

Claudio Lotito, the current chairman of Lazio, purchased the club from Cragnotti in 2004, but owned just 26.969% of shares as the largest shareholders at that time. It was followed by banking group Capitalia (and its subsidiaries Mediocredito Centrale, Banca di Roma and Banco di Sicilia) as the second largest shareholders for 17.717%. Capitalia also hold 49% stake of Italpetroli (via Capitalia's subsidiary Banca di Roma), the parent company of city rival Roma (via Italpetroli's subsidiary "Roma 2000"). Lotito later purchased the minority stake from Capitalia.

As of 2018, Claudio Lotito owns just over two-thirds of the shares of Lazio. Lazio is one of only three Italian clubs listed on the Borsa Italiana, the others being Juventus and Roma. In the past, Lazio was the only one with a single primary share holder (Lotito). However, following several capital increases by Roma and Juventus, they also are significantly owned by a shareholder. According to The Football Money League, published by consultants Deloitte, in the 2004–05 season, Lazio was the 20th highest earning football club in the world with an estimated revenue of €83 million; the 2005 ranking of the club was 15th. However, in 2016 ranking (the rank used data in 2014–15 season), Lazio was not in the top 20.

Lazio was one of the few clubs that self-sustain from the financial support of a shareholder, and also consistently make an aggregate profit after every season. Unlike Internazionale, Roma and Milan, who were sanctioned by UEFA due to breaches of Financial Fair Play, Lazio passed the regulations held by the administrative body with the high achievements. Lotito also received a prize that joint awarded by Associazione Italiana Allenatori Calcio and DGS Sport&Cultura, due to Lazio's financial health.

In 2017, the club renewed their sponsorship deal with shirt manufacturer Macron. It was worth €16 million a season, plus variables of about €9 million stemming from league and European competition finishes.

In February 2022, Lazio announced that they had parted ways with Macron after 10 years. Mizuno would become the team's new sportswear and technical gear provider, with the Biancocelesti receiving €20 million over the next five years as a result of their new agreement with the Japanese company.

In March 2022, Lazio released their financial reports from June to December 2021 which showed a decrease in revenue (from €106.66 to €71.56 million) but an increase in profit (from -€0.12 million to €4.6 million) compared to the previous six months.

In March 2025, Italian NewspaperIl Messaggero reported that Lazio could soon have their own docu-series on Netflix dedicated to the history of the club, from the foundation in 1900 all the way to the modern era. This multi-season series would not only focus on Lazio's triumphs on the pitch, but also on the club's elusive fanbase. Several legendary figures would appear in the series, including Giuseppe Signori, Miroslav Klose and Paolo Di Canio.

In March 2025, Lazio released their financial reports from June to December 2024 which yielded €87.5 million in overall revenues. On the other hand, the club reduced its costs from €97.2 million in the year prior to just under €87 million this time around.

SS Lazio (Group) Consolidated financial statements
Year	Turnover	Result	Total Assets	Net Assets
2005–06	€87,945,533	€16,790,826	€150,061,486	(€25,406,939)
2006–07	▼€76,271,329	▼€1,467,481	▲€187,378,234	▲ (€23,986,229)
2007–08	▲€102,482,031	▲€13,761,874	▼€165,628,257	▲ (€9,839,179)
2008–09	▼€92,001,361	▼€12,050,984	▲€166,196,353	▲€2,218,231
2009–10	▲€98,501,843	▼ (€1,692,751)	▲€168,732,996	▼€508,710
2010–11	▼€93,670,372	▲€9,982,408	▼€165,245,840	▲€10,500,666
2011–12	▲€95,509,291	▼€4,221,554	▲€185,154,912	▲€14,665,185
2012–13	▲€109,794,311	▼ (€5,894,288)	▼€169,728,461	▼€8,710,921
2013–14	▼€107,509,172	▲€7,068,190	▲€174,890,394	▲€15,720,281
2014–15	▲€110,927,382	▼€5,812,193	▲€177,369,842	▲€21,544,400
2015–16	▼€93,820,507	▼ (€12,625,154)	▼€166,627,240	▼€8,869,720
2016–17	▲€129,060,393	▲€11,377,545	▲€204,540,451	▲€20,303,284

== See also ==
- Football in Italy
- Lazio (futsal)
- Lazio Women

== Sources ==
- Melli, Franco and Marco (2005). La storia della Lazio (in Italian). Rome: L'airone Editrice. ISBN 88-7944-725-4.
- Barbero, Sergio (1999). Lazio. Il lungo volo dell'aquila (in Italian). Graphot. ISBN 88-86906-19-6.
- Barraco, Egidio (1992). Nella Lazio ho giocato anch'io. Novantanni in biancoazzurro (in Italian). Aldo Pimerano. ISBN 88-85946-09-7.
- Bocchio, Sandro; Tosco, Giovanni (2000). Dizionario della grande Lazio (in Italian). Newton & Compton. ISBN 88-8289-495-9.
- Cacciari, Patrizio; Filacchione; Stabile (2004). 1974. Nei ricordi dei protagonisti la storia incredibile della Lazio di Maestrelli (in Italian). Eraclea Libreria Sportiva. ISBN 88-88771-10-7.
- Chinaglia, Giorgio (1984). Passione Lazio (in Italian). Rome: Lucarini. ISBN 88-7033-051-6.
- Chiappaventi, Guy (2004). Pistole e palloni. Gli anni Settanta nel racconto della Lazio campione d'Italia (in Italian). Limina. ISBN 88-88551-30-1.
- Filacchione, Marco (2002). Il volo dell'aquila. Numeri e uomini della grande Lazio (in Italian). Eraclea Libreria Sportiva. ISBN 88-88771-08-5.
- Martin, Simon (2006). Calcio e fascismo. Lo sport nazionale sotto Mussolini (in Italian). Mondadori. ISBN 88-04-55566-1.
- Melli, Franco (2000). Cara Lazio (in Italian). Rome: Lucarini. ISBN 88-7033-297-7.
- Melli, Franco (2000). Saga biancazzurra. La Lazio, Cragnotti, il nuovo potere (in Italian). Rome: Limina. ISBN 88-86713-56-8.
- Pennacchia, Mario (1994). Lazio patria nostra: storia della società biancoceleste (in Italian). Rome: Abete Edizioni. ISBN 88-7047-058-X.
- Recanatesi, Franco (2005). Uno più undici. Maestrelli: la vita di un gentiluomo del calcio, dagli anni Trenta allo scudetto del '74 (in Italian). Rome: L'Airone Editrice. ISBN 88-7944-844-7.
- Tozzi, Alessandro (2005). La mia Lazio. L'Avventura nel meno nove e altre storie biancocelesti (in Italian). Eraclea Libreria Sportiva. ISBN 88-88771-14-X.
- Valilutti, Francesco (1997). Breve storia della grande Lazio (in Italian). Rome: Newton & Compton editori. ISBN 88-7983-859-8.
