= Filipe Bordon =

Brazilian footballer

Personal information
- Date of birth: 24 June 2005 (age 21)
- Place of birth: Ribeirão Preto, Brazil
- Height: 1.92 m (6 ft 4 in)
- Position: Centre-back

Team information
- Current team: Lazio
- Number: 76

Youth career
- 2017: Botafogo-SP
- 2018: Inter de Bebedouro
- 2019–2024: Ferroviária
- 2022: → Athletico Paranaense (loan)
- 2023–2024: → Lazio (loan)
- 2024–2025: Lazio

Senior career*
Years	Team	Apps	(Gls)
2024–	Lazio	0	(0)
2025–2026	→ Südtirol (loan)	15	(0)

International career^{‡}
2024–2025	Brazil U20	4	(0)
Medal record
Men's football
Representing Brazil
South American U-20 Championship
Winner	2025 Venezuela
- * Club domestic league appearances and goals as of 12 May 2026 ‡ National team caps and goals as of 16:37, 17 February 2025 (UTC)

Filipe Bordon (born 24 June 2005) is a Brazilian professional footballer who plays as a centre-back for Serie A club Lazio. He is the son of former Brazilian international Marcelo Bordon.

== Club career ==
Born in Ribeirão Preto, Bordon played in the youth categories of Botafogo, Inter de Bebedouro, Ferroviária and Athletico Paranaense. In 2024, he was acquired by Lazio, who loaned him out to Südtirol in Serie B with an option to buy on 10 July 2025.

== International career ==
Despite also having Italian citizenship, on 23 August 2024, Bordon chose to defend the Brazil under-20 team, being called up by coach Ramon Menezes for the friendlies held against Mexico on 5 and 8 September. Bordon was also part of the winning squad of the 2025 South American U-20 Championship.

== Honours ==
Brazil U20

- South American Youth Football Championship: 2025
