= Diogo Mucuri =

Brazilian footballer (born 1985)

Personal information
- Full name: Diogo dos Santos Lima
- Date of birth: December 27, 1985 (age 40)
- Place of birth: Itabuna, Bahia, Brazil

Team information
- Current team: Cruzeiro Esporte Clube

Diogo dos Santos Lima (born December 27, 1985), known as Diogo Mucuri, is a Brazilian football player who plays for Cruzeiro Esporte Clube.

== Early life ==
DDiogo Mucuri was born in Itabuna, Bahia, Brazil.

== Career ==
He was brought up in the Cruzeiro EC youth teams. Diogo Mucuri has played for Cruzeiro in the Campeonato Brasileiro and Copa do Brasil.

== Achievements ==
- Campeonato Mineiro: 2006
