= Diogo Mónica =

Portuguese entrepreneur

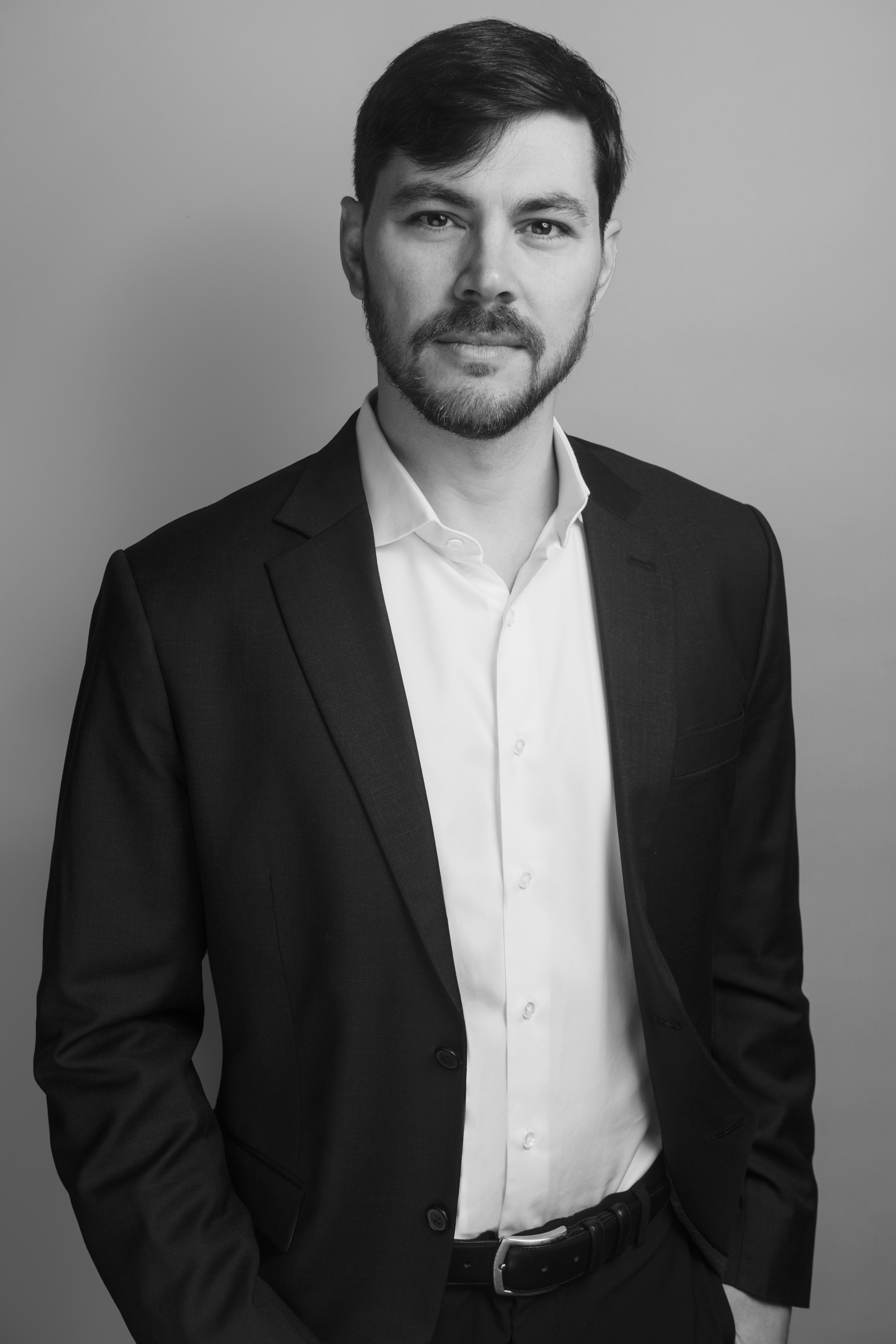
- Born: California, United States
- Education: PhD in computer science
- Alma mater: Instituto Superior Técnico
- Occupations: Entrepreneur; Engineer
- Years active: 2011–present
- Known for: Co-founder and president of Anchorage Digital
- Website: diogomonica.com

Diogo Mónica is a Portuguese-American entrepreneur and engineer who is the co-founder of Anchorage Digital, a cryptocurrency and digital asset platform headquartered in the United States. Prior to founding Anchorage, he led cybersecurity at companies like Square and Docker.

== Early life and education ==
Diogo Mónica was born in the U.S. state of California, but was raised primarily in Portugal. His father was a captain in the Portuguese Navy. Mónica attended the Instituto Superior Técnico (IST) in Taguspark, earning a bachelor's degree in telecommunications and informatics engineering and a master's degree in communication networks engineering. He ultimately earned his PhD in computer science at IST.

== Career ==
While still at university, Mónica presented a paper at a conference in the United States, garnering job offers from Google and Facebook. He opted to take a job with the startup payment platform, Square (now Block), as lead security engineer. While working at Square, Mónica identified an issue with the online reservation service, OpenTable, that let users create bots to reserve tables as soon as a reservation became available. He also wrote code that would allow other users to do the same, publishing the code and his findings on his eponymous blog.

In 2015, Mónica left Square to become the security lead at the software company, Docker. Throughout his time at Square and Docker, he was also a member of the Institute of Electrical and Electronics Engineers, chairing the institute's Public Visibility Committee for a time. In November 2017, he co-founded digital asset platform Anchorage Digital with Nathan McCauley, whom he had met while working at Square. Mónica is the president of Anchorage, which has the first federally chartered cryptocurrency bank in the United States and received a valuation of over $3 billion in 2021.
