= Diogo Vasconcelos =

Portuguese politician

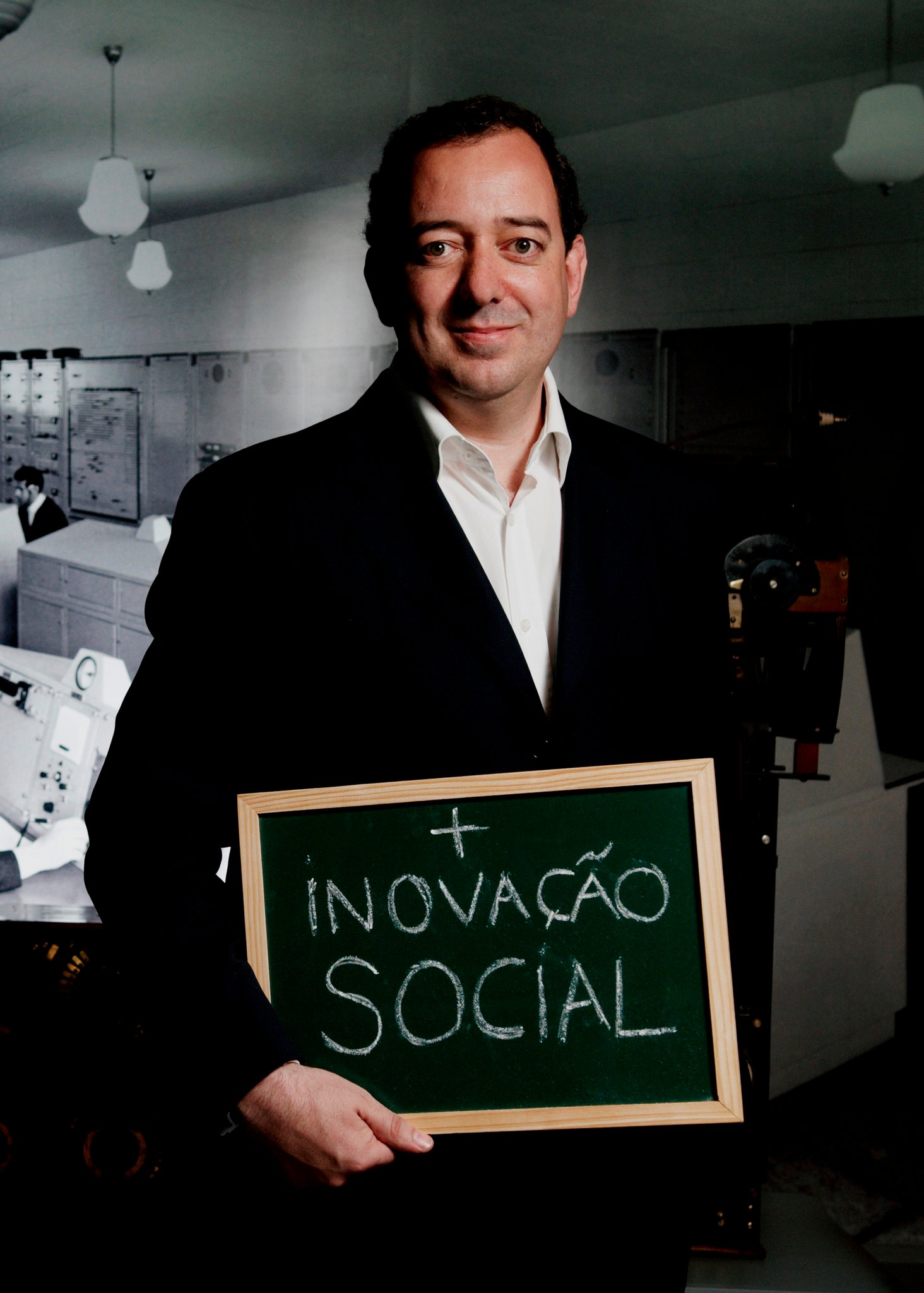
Diogo Vasconcelos

Diogo Vasconcelos (16 May 1968 – 8 July 2011) was a Portuguese politician, who focused his work on innovation and on the fundamental role of ICT and next generation broadband for fostering innovation and supporting new decentralized models to address some of the major global societal challenges of the 21st century. Diogo addressed such issues as climate change, urbanization, globalization, ageing population, sustainable prosperity, democracy and citizen’s participation, etc. During his career, he worked with different governments in Europe and the Middle East, with the European Commission, with the UN’s High Commissioner for the Alliance of Civilizations and the European Investment Bank, OECD, among others.

== Early career ==
Born in Porto, Vasconcelos had a Law degree and post-graduate degrees in Communications Law, Management and Political Science.

Still as a student, Diogo was co-founder of CAIS (homeless magazine) and co-organizer of the 1995 East Timor Peace Mission. He was also the founder and 1st President of Porto Academic Federation (re-elected twice).

Diogo founded a multimedia company and published the first magazines in his country on both the internet and entrepreneurship. As Vice-president of the National Entrepreneurs Association (www.anje.pt) between 1996 and 2002, he also launched the Entrepreneurs Academy.

== Political career ==
Diogo was involved with politics from a very early stage. In 2002, he was elected member of the Parliament and was Vice-President of Social Democratic Party and its spokesperson for Innovation and knowledge Society.

He was also a member of the board of the Portuguese Innovation Agency, where he was responsible for the launch of several initiatives for new entrepreneurs, for the development of tech transfer offices in all universities & for the creation of new R&D departments in the private sector.

From 2003 to 2005, he led the Knowledge Society Unit, where he created and implemented the Information Society, eGovernment and National Broadband Initiatives, reporting to Prime Minister José Manuel Barroso.

Before joining Cisco, Diogo was the Knowledge Economy Advisor to the Portuguese President of Republic Cavaco Silva and lead the President’s 1st term digital campaign and "digital presidency".

== Professional and social career ==
From February 2007 and until his death, Diogo Vasconcelos was a Senior Director and Distinguished Fellow with Ciscos Internet Business Solutions Group (IBSG), the global open innovation and strategy group of Cisco.

From 2009, he also chaired Dialogue Café Association, a global NGO that aims at bringing people together from cities across the globe to learn, share and collaborate on projects which support people and planet, through state-of-the-art video conference technology.

Between July 2007 and the time of his death, Diogo was the chairman of SIX - SocialInnovation eXchange, a global community of NGOs, global firms, public agencies and academics committed to improve the methods with which our societies find better solutions to challenges such as ageing, climate change, public services and healthcare.

Between May 2008 and March 2011, Diogo was Chairman of APDC – Portuguese Association for the Development of Communications, a public interest organization that represents the telecom and ICT industry in Portugal since 1984. In 2009, he was elected member of the Executive Board on DigitalEurope the voice of digital industry in Europe.

== Other activities ==
Diogo was also member of the board of the Catholic University of Porto and member of the advisory boards of leading European think tanks, as the Lisbon Council (Brussels) and European House-Ambrosetti (Milan). He was also a fellow of ResPublica (London).

Diogo was also a co-founder and member of the Board of the European VentureClub, a network of leading international venture capital firms and corporate investors interested to co-invest in Europe and foster the internationalisation of European startups.

== Awards ==
In 2006, Diogo received from Portuguese President of Republic Jorge Sampaio one of his country’s highest honours for his work, the "Commander of the Order of Prince D. Henrique".

== Related work ==
Diogo chaired the Business Panel on Future EU Innovation Policy, set up by the European Commission in January 2009, which called for a radical change in European innovation policies. Following the Business Panel report, he was later invited by European Commissioner for Research and Innovation Ms Máire Geoghegan-Quinn to become a member of the High Level Panel on Measurement of Innovation, advising her and her colleagues on various innovation issues, as well as on the choice of a new headline innovation indicator in support of the Europe 2020 Strategy. Also as a follow up of Business Panel work, he was also actively involved in the organization of the Informal Panel on EU Innovation, that developed a set of proposals, ideas and recommendations on how to successfully implement the Innovation Union Initiative.

He collaborated with European Investment Bank and OECD on innovation issues. Diogo also worked with Lebanon and Palestine on innovation, IT & broadband for social cohesion and economy growth. He was a member of the ICT industry working group assisting the European Commission in the implementation of the Digital Agenda initiative, namely regarding next generation networks.

He advised the EU on ambient assisted living innovation, namely as a member of the high-level panel responsible for the interim evaluation of the EU AAL Joint Programme. Diogo also participated in the high-level panel established by European Commissioner Neelie Kroes to advise the European Commission on ICT innovative solutions to help elderly to live more independently, giving input on the "European Innovation Partnerships" and shaping the "Active and Healthy Ageing pilots".

In the field of Social Innovation, he co-authored the report on "Europe and Social Innovation" for the BEPA (Bureau of European Policy Advisers) and was at the forefront of the European Social Innovation Initiative (SIE), launched 16–17 March 2011 by the European Commission. Acknowledging his lead role in this field, the European Commission has also launched the "European Social innovation prize Competition inmemory of Diogo Vasconcelos".
