= Diogo Galvão =

Brazilian footballer (born 1982)

Personal information
- Full name: Diogo Galvão de Macedo
- Date of birth: March 7, 1982 (age 44)
- Place of birth: Rondonópolis, Brazil
- Height: 1.73 m (5 ft 8 in)
- Position: Striker

Senior career*
Years	Team	Apps	(Gls)
2003–2004	União Rondonópolis		
2004–2005	Gama		
2006	União Rondonópolis		
2006	Beira-Mar	3	(0)
2006–2007	Chaves	13	(2)
2007–2008	Nelas		
2008–2009	União Rondonópolis		
2009	Araguaia		
2009	Vila Aurora		
2010	Trindade		
2010–2012	Goiás	2	(0)
2010	→ Atlético Goianiense (loan)	5	(1)
2011	→ Paysandu (loan)	12	(0)
2012	→ Anapolina (loan)		
2012	→ Brasiliense (loan)		
- * Club domestic league appearances and goals as of December 10, 2011

Diogo Galvão de Macedo, the Diogo Galvão (born March 7, 1982) is a Brazilian football striker. In 2011 he played in the Goiás. That July he moved to Paysandu.
