= Diogo Pires (Brazilian footballer) =

Brazilian footballer (born 1981)

Personal information
- Full name: Diogo José Pires
- Date of birth: 18 December 1981 (age 44)
- Place of birth: Brazil
- Height: 1.78 m (5 ft 10 in)
- Positions: Left back; left winger

Senior career*
| Years | Team | Apps | (Gls) |
| ????–2005 | União Barbarense | | |
| 2005–2006 | Mladá Boleslav | 6 | (0) |
| 2006–2007 | Karpaty Lviv | 10 | (0) |
| 2007 | Santo André | | |
| 2007–2008 | FC Itaucu | | |
| 2008–2010 | Slovan Bratislava | 21 | (3) |
| 2010 | →MFK Petržalka (loan) | 9 | (0) |
| 2011 | Rio Claro | 12 | (0) |
| 2011 | São Bento | | |
| 2011–2017 | Guarani | | |
- * Club domestic league appearances and goals as of 9 February 2012

José Diego Pires (born 18 December 1981) is a Brazilian former football player, who played as a defender or midfielder.

He has a gifted left foot, as is one of the team's main free kick takers. His father Waldir Peres played as goalkeeper for the Seleção.
