= Diogo Malaquías =

Brazilian footballer (born 1988)

Diogo Malaquias da Silva (born October 15, 1988 in Rio de Janeiro) is a Brazilian footballer.

== Teams ==
- (Uruguay) Tacuarembo 2009-2010
- (Uruguay) Montevideo Wanderers 2011-2013
