= Diogo Gaspar =

Portuguese footballer

Personal information
- Full name: Diogo António Taborda Gaspar
- Date of birth: 21 January 1992 (age 34)
- Place of birth: Covilhã, Portugal
- Height: 1.75 m (5 ft 9 in)
- Position: Right-back

Team information
- Current team: Guarda

Youth career
- 2002–2011: Sporting Covilhã

Senior career*
Years	Team	Apps	(Gls)
2010–2014	Sporting Covilhã	2	(0)
2014–2015	Manteigas		
2015–2016	Sporting Covilhã B	19	(3)
2016–2017	Sporting Covilhã	0	(0)
2017	Águias Moradal	5	(0)
2017–2018	Alcains	4	(0)
2018–2020	ADRC Pedrógão	27	(8)
2020–	Guarda		
- * Club domestic league appearances and goals as of 1 August 2020

Diogo António Taborda Gaspar (born 21 January 1992) is a Portuguese footballer who plays for ADRC Pedrógão as a right-back.

== Career ==
On 31 July 2013, he made his professional debut with Sporting Covilhã in a 2013–14 Taça da Liga match against Desportivo Chaves, when he played the full game and scored his first goal (41st minute) . While only playing two league games as a substitute, he played 6 cup games for Covilhã.
