= Diogo Pinheiro =

Brazilian footballer (born 1990)

Diogo
Personal information
- Full name: Diogo Pinheiro Sousa
- Date of birth: 20 March 1990 (age 36)
- Place of birth: Brazil
- Position: Midfielder

Team information
- Current team: Marino de Luanco

Senior career*
Years	Team	Apps	(Gls)
2010–2011	Fortuna Sittard	12	(2)
2013–2014	Floriana	29	(12)
2014–2015	Mosta	3	(1)
2015–	Marino de Luanco	9	(0)
- * Club domestic league appearances and goals as of 20:00, 2 September 2015 (UTC)

Diogo Pinheiro Sousa, known as Diogo, (born 20 March 1990) is a Brazilian professional footballer who plays for Spanish club Marino de Luanco, as a midfielder.

== Career ==
Diogo has played in the Netherlands, Malta and Spain for Fortuna Sittard, Floriana, Mosta and Marino de Luanco.
