= Diogo Leite (footballer, born 1989) =

Portuguese footballer

Personal information
- Full name: Diogo Carvalho Pereira Leite
- Date of birth: 29 April 1989 (age 37)
- Place of birth: Porto, Portugal
- Height: 1.84 m (6 ft 0 in)
- Position: Central defender

Youth career
- 2006–2008: Boavista

Senior career*
Years	Team	Apps	(Gls)
2008–2011	Boavista	16	(0)
- * Club domestic league appearances and goals

Diogo Carvalho Pereira Leite (born 29 April 1989) is a Portuguese former professional footballer who played as a central defender. He studied sports management.
