= Diogo Oliveira (footballer, born 1986) =

Brazilian footballer

Personal information
- Full name: Diogo Antunes de Oliveira
- Date of birth: 29 October 1986 (age 40)
- Place of birth: Arapongas, Brazil
- Height: 1.81 m (5 ft 11 in)
- Position: Midfielder

Youth career
- 2003–2004: Atlético-PR

Senior career*
Years	Team	Apps	(Gls)
2005	Londrina		
2006–2008	Figueirense	68	(4)
2009	→ Grêmio (loan)	0	(0)
2009–2011	Fluminense	69	(0)
2012	Sport	1	(0)
2012	→ Figueirense (loan)	6	(0)
2013	→ Vegalta Sendai (loan)	0	(0)
2014	Sport	3	(0)
2015	Inter de Lages	17	(0)
2015	Operário Ferroviário	3	(0)
2016	Juventus	12	(0)
2016	Linense	5	(0)
2016	→ São Carlos (loan)	11	(0)
2017	URT	6	(0)
2017	Moto Club	18	(0)
2018	Novo Hamburgo	7	(0)
2019	Imperatriz	8	(1)
2020	Villa Nova	6	(0)
2020–	União Cacoalense	0	(0)
- * Club domestic league appearances and goals

Diogo Antunes de Oliveira (born 29 October 1986) is a Brazilian former professional footballer who played as a midfielder.

== Honours ==
- Campeonato Catarinense: 2006
- Campeonato Brasileiro Série A: 2010
