= Diogo (footballer, born 1988) =

Brazilian footballer

Personal information
- Full name: Diogo da Costa Oliveira
- Date of birth: 4 January 1988 (age 38)
- Place of birth: São Paulo, Brazil
- Height: 1.74 m (5 ft 9 in)
- Positions: Right back; winger

Team information
- Current team: Inter Turku
- Number: 19

Youth career
- 2002–2006: Internacional

Senior career*
Years	Team	Apps	(Gls)
2006–2009	Internacional		
2010	Stabæk	19	(1)
2012–2013	Canoas	14	(0)
2013	Vasalund	0	(0)
2014–	Inter Turku	11	(1)
2015	Åbo	1	(0)
- * Club domestic league appearances and goals as of 14 October 2015

Diogo da Costa Oliveira, commonly just Diogo, (born 4 January 1988) is a retired Brazilian football player who played both as a fullback and winger, mainly on the right side.

== Career ==
=== Sport Club Internacional ===
Diogo started his career at Sport Club Internacional from Porto Alegre. Before becoming professional he won many championships and leagues with the youth team, specially the Brazil National Championship Sub-20, playing in the same team of Alexandre Pato.

He became professional and trained along with the team that ended year 2006 as champion of FIFA Club World Cup against FC Barcelona.

== Norway ==
Diogo signed a one-year contract with Stabæk Fotball before the 2010 season. He scored his first and only goal for Stabæk against Vålerenga on September 12, 2010. The contract was not renewed.

== Sweden and Finland ==
In August 2013 Diogo joined Swedish club Vasalunds IF, but did not play any games.

In 2014 and 2015, Diogo played 18 matches for Inter Turku in the Veikkausliiga.
