= Rachele Mussolini (politician) =

Italian politician (born 1974)

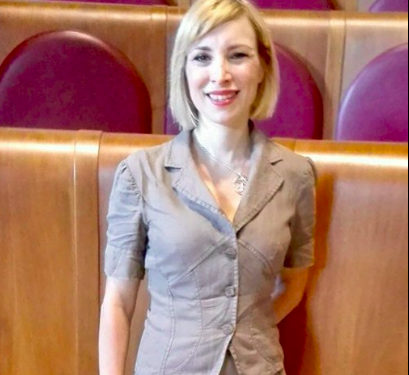
- Mussolini in 2017

Member of the City Council of Rome
- Incumbent
- Assumed office 22 June 2016

Personal details
- Born: May 25, 1974 (age 52) Rome, Italy
- Party: Forza Italia
- Other political affiliations: Brothers of Italy (until 2024)
- Parent(s): Romano Mussolini (father); Carla Puccini (mother)
- Relatives: Alessandra Mussolini (half-sister); Mussolini family
- Occupation: Politician, councillor
- Website: fratelli-italia.it

Rachele Mussolini (born 25 May 1974) is an Italian politician and a city councillor of Rome since 2016. She was formerly a member of the right-wing party Brothers of Italy, but defected to the centre-right Forza Italia in 2024. She has been serving two consecutive terms as a councillor in Rome. She is the granddaughter of fascist dictator Benito Mussolini and Rachele Mussolini and half-sister of Alessandra Mussolini.

== Political career ==
Rachele Mussolini joined politics in 2016, being elected as a councillor for the far-right party Brothers of Italy.

In October 2021, Rachele was re-elected to the municipal council of Rome with the most votes. With counting done in more than 97 percent of polling stations, Mussolini garnered more than 8,200 preference votes after standing for the right-wing Brothers of Italy party.

On September 12, 2024, she announced that she intended to leave Brothers of Italy and join the party Forza Italia, criticising her former party's use of symbolism derived from the Italian Social Movement.

== Media appearances ==
Interviews & TV appearances
Year	Title	Role	Media Outlet
2021	Cartello di Rachele Mussolini sul 25 aprile	Appearance	La7 Attualita
2021	Benito Mussolini's Granddaughter, Rachele Mussolini, proves that one can be more than their surname	Appearance	Wion
2020	Intervista a Rachele Mussolini	Interview	YouTube with Laura Fazio
2020	Sit-down with Rachele & Alessandra Mussolini	TV appearance	La7 Attualita

Rachele Mussolini has appeared across various media platforms including in Italy, India, the United States and Europe.

== Personal life ==
She is the daughter of jazz musician Romano Mussolini, the fourth child of Italian fascist dictator Benito Mussolini, and his second wife Carla Maria Puccini, a retired actress. She was named after her grandmother Rachele Mussolini.

She has a half-sister, Alessandra Mussolini, former leader of a small Italian far-right party often described as neofascist, Alternativa Sociale, former member of the European Parliament within Silvio Berlusconi’s centre-right alliance People of Freedom, and current member of the Chamber of Deputies representing Forza Italia.
