= Social action (disambiguation) =

Social action is a sociological concept.

It may also refer to:

- Social Action, an Italian political party
- Social Action Party, a Thai political party
