= Almeria Walk of Fame =

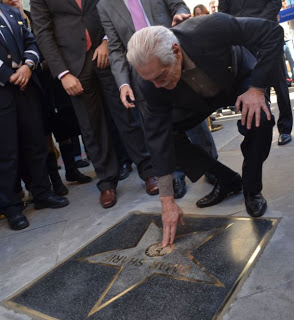
- Omar Sharif showing the star
- Established: 2012
- Location: Almería
- Type: Entertainment hall of fame

Almeria Walk of Fame (Paseo de la fama de Almería in Spanish) is the filmmaking Walk of Fame located in Almeria, Spain, similar to Hollywood Walk of Fame.

== Celebrities ==
The celebrities who have their own star are:

| Artist | Date | Film | Ref. | Image |
|---|---|---|---|---|
| Eduardo Fajardo | 11 April 2012 | 7th Cavalry and Django | | |
| Omar Sharif | 4 December 2012 | Lawrence of Arabia | | |
| Ridley Scott | 2013 | Exodus: Gods and Kings | | |
| Producer Denis O'Dell | 3 December 2013 | How I Won the War | | |
| Max von Sydow | 5 December 5, 2013 | March or Die | | |
| Arnold Schwarzenegger | 29 October 2014 | Conan the Barbarian | (Note: as well as receiving Almería Tierra de Cine prix.) | |
| Terry Gilliam | 3 December 2014 | | (Note: during the XIII Festival Internacional de Cortometrajes Almería en Corto.) | |
| Patrick Wayne | 1 December 1, 2015 | The Deserter, Sinbad and the Eye of the Tiger and Rustlers' Rhapsody | | |
| Ángela Molina | 6 December 2015 | Las cosas del querer, L'homme qui a perdu son ombre and One of the Hollywood Ten | | |
| Catherine Deneuve | 13 November 2016 | March or Die | | |
| José Coronado | 19 November 2016 | | (Note: as well as the Almería Tierra de Cine prix.) | |
| Brian De Palma | | Domino | | |
| Sophia Loren | 16 November 2017 | White Sister | (Note: She also received the Almería Tierra de Cine award.) | |
| Álex de la Iglesia | 17 November 2017 | | | |
| Blake Lively | July 2018 | The Rhythm Section (2019) | | |
| Luis Tosar | 17 November 2018 | El Niño (2014) and Toro (2016) | | |
| Alison Doody | 21 November 2018 | | | |
| Bo Derek | 24 November 2018 | She also received the Almería Tierra de Cine award | | |
| Jorge Sanz | 16 November 2019 | long career | | |
| Enrique Cerezo | 13 November 2026 | La vuelta de El Coyote and Dollar for the Dead | | |

== Postponed stars ==
- Aaron Paul has shown affection for the city, and he has confirmed he would receive a star for his role in Exodus: Gods and Kings in 2014 when he came back to promote the film.
- Ayuntamiento de Almería is working in order to Clint Eastwood received this honour when he came back to the city.
- Danish actor Nikolaj Coster-Waldau will receive the star for his role in Brian De Palma's film.

== See also ==
- List of halls and walks of fame
