= Live from the TCM Classic Film Festival =

American television documentary series

Live from the TCM Classic Film Festival is a television documentary series broadcast on Turner Classic Movies in the United States. Each episode features an in-depth interview with a famous actor concerning their life and career, taped in front of a live audience during the TCM Classic Film Festival and broadcast the following year.

== Episodes ==
- Luise Rainer (2010). The interview conducted by Robert Osborne was broadcast on January 12, 2011.
- Peter O'Toole (2011). The interview conducted by Robert Osborne was broadcast on April 12, 2012.
- Kim Novak (2012). The interview conducted by Robert Osborne was broadcast on March 3, 2013.
- Eva Marie Saint (2013). The interview conducted by Robert Osborne was broadcast on March 31, 2014.
- Alan Arkin (2014). The interview conducted by Robert Osborne was broadcast on March 24, 2015.
- Sophia Loren (2015). The interview conducted by Edoardo Ponti was broadcast on April 24, 2016.
- Faye Dunaway (2016). The interview conducted by Ben Mankiewicz was broadcast on April 3, 2017.
- Michael Douglas (2017). The interview conducted by Ben Mankiewicz and will be broadcast on TCM in 2018.
