= Romano Mussolini =

Italian jazz pianist, painter, and film producer (1927–2006)

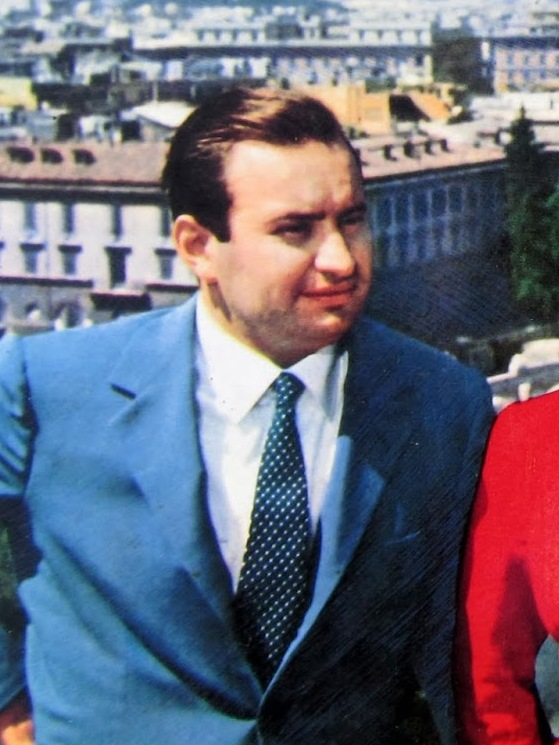
- Mussolini in 1958
- Born: Romano Bruno Mussolini; 26 September 1927; Forlì, Italy
- Died: 3 February 2006 (aged 78); Rome, Italy
- Occupations: Jazz pianist; painter; film producer
- Spouses: Maria Scicolone (m. 1962; div. 1971): Carla M. Puccini
- Children: 3, including Alessandra and Rachele
- Parent(s): Benito Mussolini; Rachele Mussolini
- Relatives: Sophia Loren (former sister-in-law); Romano Floriani Mussolini (grandson)

Romano Bruno Mussolini (26 September 1927 – 3 February 2006) was an Italian jazz pianist, painter, and film producer. He was the fourth child and youngest son of Benito Mussolini.

== Early life and education ==
Romano Mussolini grew up in Villa Carpena, his family's residence in Forlì in Romagna. He studied music as a child, playing classical pieces on the piano and accompanying his father, Benito Mussolini, who played the violin. Following World War II, he started playing jazz under the assumed name "Romano Full".

== Musical career ==
His playing style has been described as "like a slightly melancholic Oscar Peterson. Occasionally inspired, he was always efficient; he made the refrains run on time."

== Personal life ==
In 1962, Mussolini married Maria Scicolone, the younger sister of actress Sophia Loren. They had two daughters, Alessandra and her younger sister Elisabetta. Alessandra led a small Italian far-right party often described as neofascist, Alternativa Sociale. Romano Mussolini composed the party's official anthem, "The Pride of Being Italian".

With his second wife, the actress Carla Maria Puccini, he had a daughter, Rachele Mussolini, named after his mother Rachele Mussolini. The younger Rachele has served as a member of the city council of Rome.

Mussolini was very reserved about his family history until the entry of the post-fascist National Alliance party into government following the 2001 general election. In 2004 he published a broadly sympathetic account of his personal recollections of his father, Il Duce, mio padre (translated as My father, il Duce: a memoir by Mussolini's son, alluding to the Fascist dictator's official title), including anecdotes of private confidences and discussions.

== Death ==
Romano Mussolini died from heart problems in a hospital in Rome in 2006, aged 78.

== Selected discography ==
- Mirage (1974)
- Soft & Swing (1996)
- The Wonderful World of Louis (2001)
- Timeless Blues (2002)
- Music Blues (2002)
- Romano Piano & Forte (2002)
- Jazz Album (2003)
- Napule 'nu quarto 'e luna (2003)
- Alibi perfetto (2004) – soundtrack

== Books ==
- Mussolini, Romano (2006) [2004]. My father il Duce: a memoir by Mussolini's son. Translated by Stojanovic, Ana. Introductory essay by Alexander Stille. San Diego, CA: Kales Press. ISBN 0-9670076-8-2.
