= Aurora (1984 film) =

- Written by: John McGreevey; Franco Ferrini; Gianni Menon; Maurizio Ponzi
- Directed by: Maurizio Ponzi
- Starring: Sophia Loren; Edoardo Ponti; Philippe Noiret; Daniel J. Travanti
- Music by: Georges Delerue
- Country of origin: Italy
- Original language: Italian

Production
- Executive producers: Tony Converse; Roger Gimbel
- Producers: Carlo Ponti; Alex Ponti
- Cinematography: Roberto Gerardi
- Editor: Michael Brown
- Running time: 95 minutes
- Production companies: New Team; Roger Gimbel Productions

Original release
- Network: NBC
- Release: October 21, 1984

Aurora (Italian: Qualcosa di biondo) is a 1984 Italian made-for-television drama film directed by Maurizio Ponzi and starring Sophia Loren, Edoardo Ponti and Daniel J. Travanti. In order to raise money for an operation for her son, a woman tells various former wealthy lovers that they are his father. The film originally premiered in the United States on NBC on October 21, 1984 and released theatrically in Italy on January 17, 1985.

== Plot ==
A desperate woman (Loren), in crisis and poverty, is in search of the cruel husband (Noiret) who abandoned after giving her a son. The boy has now become almost an adult has a serious eye problem and is likely to become completely blind. The mother then choose to leave to go in search of his father, who in the meantime is starting a new life. When the mother finds out where he is, also learns that the cruel man has remade a family by marrying a young girl, who became the mother of a twenty-year-old son who has had the cruel man from another relationship. [This plot can be incomplete, or maybe wrong. Please check it.]

== Cast ==
- Sophia Loren as Aurora
- Edoardo Ponti as Aurora's Son
- Daniel J. Travanti as David Ackermann
- Angela Goodwin as Nurse
- Ricky Tognazzi as Michele Orcini
- Marisa Merlini as Teresa
- Anna Strasberg as Angela Feretti
- Franco Fabrizi as Guelfo
- Philippe Noiret as Dr. André Feretti
- Antonio Allocca as Taxi Driver
- David Cameron as Floyd
- Vittorio Duse as Mechanic
- Jorge Krimer as Priest
- Gianfranco Amoroso as Gasoline Attendant
- Alessandra Mussolini as Bride
