= The Life Ahead =

2020 Italian drama film directed by Edoardo Ponti

- Official poster
- Directed by: Edoardo Ponti
- Screenplay by: Edoardo Ponti; Ugo Chiti
- Based on: The Life Before Us by: Romain Gary; Madame Rosa; by Moshé Mizrahi
- Produced by: Carlo Degli Esposti; Nicola Serra; Regina K. Scully; Lynda Weinman; Jamie Wolf
- Starring: Sophia Loren; Ibrahim Gueye
- Cinematography: Angus Hudson
- Edited by: Jacopo Quadri
- Music by: Gabriel Yared
- Production companies: Palomar; Impact Partners; Artemis Rising; Another Chance Productions; Foothills Productions
- Distributed by: Netflix
- Release dates: 6 November 2020 (United States); 13 November 2020 (Italy)
- Running time: 95 minutes
- Country: Italy
- Language: Italian

The Life Ahead (Italian: La vita davanti a sé) is a 2020 Italian drama film directed by Edoardo Ponti, from a screenplay by Ponti and Ugo Chiti. It is the third screen adaptation of the 1975 novel The Life Before Us by Romain Gary. It stars Sophia Loren, Ibrahim Gueye and Abril Zamora, and is set in Bari, Italy. The film was preceded by Madame Rosa, a 1977 film based on the Gary novel, directed by Moshé Mizrahi and featuring Simone Signoret. Like the book, the first film version is set in Paris.The Life Ahead was given a limited release on November 6, 2020, followed by digital streaming on Netflix on November 13. The Life Ahead received major awards attention, especially for its music and lead performance, including Academy Awards and Golden Globes. The song "Io sì (Seen)" (Diane Warren and Laura Pausini) won Best Original Song at the Golden Globe Awards and was nominated for the Academy Award for Best Original Song. Sophia Loren won several Best Actress honors, including the David di Donatello and was nominated at the Satellite Awards for Best Actress in a Leading Role at 85 years old.

== Plot ==
Madam Rosa is a former prostitute and Jewish Holocaust survivor who provides a home in her apartment for the children of other "working women" in the Italian port city of Bari, Apulia. After Momo, a 12-year-old, orphaned, Senegalese immigrant, robs her, Dr. Coen, the boy's foster guardian, who also happens to be Rosa's doctor, brings her stolen items back and makes the boy apologize. Coen offers Rosa money to take in the boy and look after him for a couple of months, and she reluctantly agrees.

Momo, who has been kicked out of school for stabbing a bully with a pencil, secretly sells drugs for a dealer in Bari, but Rosa also finds him work with Hamil, a kind Muslim shopkeeper. All of these adults try to guide the boy. Rosa's neighbor and friend Lola, a transgender prostitute, whose daughter Rosa looks after, helps Rosa as she begins to decline mentally. At times she is lucid while at others she is catatonic.

Rosa and Momo develop a deep bond, and after he becomes her only ward, he quits selling drugs. Although her health is declining, Rosa asks Momo to promise to keep her out of hospitals, of which she is terrified since being medically experimented on as a child in the Auschwitz concentration camp. Momo agrees and promises, but Rosa is finally taken to the hospital after a particularly bad episode. Momo sneaks her out of the hospital at night and hides her in a basement storage room in her apartment building, where she feels safe. Momo stays there with Rosa, caring for her until she dies. Afterwards, Lola finally discovers their secret. The film ends with Rosa's funeral.

== Cast ==
- Sophia Loren as Madame Rosa
- Ibrahim Gueye as Momo
- Abril Zamora as Lola
- Renato Carpentieri as Dr. Coen
- Babak Karimi as Hamil
- Massimiliano Rossi as drug dealer

== Production ==
In July 2019, it was announced that Sophia Loren, Ibrahaim Gueye, Abril Zamora, Renato Carpentieri and Babak Karimi had joined the cast of the film, with Edoardo Ponti directing from a screenplay he wrote alongside Ugo Chiti, based upon the novel The Life Before Us by Romain Gary.

Principal photography began in July 2019 in Bari, Italy.

== Release ==
In February 2020, Netflix acquired worldwide distribution rights to the film. It was released in a limited release on November 6, 2020, followed by digital streaming on Netflix on November 13, 2020.

According to Deadline, The Life Ahead became a streaming hit, peaking within Netflix's top ten in 37 countries.

== Reception ==
=== Critical response ===
The Life Ahead holds a 92% approval rating on review aggregator website Rotten Tomatoes, based on 89 reviews, with an average of 7.1/10. The site's critical consensus reads: "A classic example of how a talented actor can elevate somewhat standard material, The Life Ahead proves Sophia Loren's star power remains absolutely undimmed." On Metacritic, the film holds a rating of 66 out of 100, based on 24 critics, indicating "generally favorable" reviews.

In a three-starred review for The Observer, Mark Kermode said of Sophia Loren: "The 86-year-old star’s expressive performance as a former sex worker caring for an orphaned child is the main draw in this sometimes formulaic tale directed by her son." P.J. Grisar of The Forward was critical in his review, calling the film "treacly," "derivative," and "clichéd" when compared with the 1977 film Madame Rosa, its "nuanced and celebrated predecessor." He calls Loren's performance "sturdy" and Ponti’s direction "capable," but describes The Life Ahead as a "wan exercise, free of humor or verve."

=== Accolades ===
Award	Date of ceremony	Category	Recipient(s)	Result	Ref.
Academy Awards	April 25, 2021	Best Original Song	"Io sì (Seen)" (Diane Warren & Laura Pausini)	Nominated	
AARP Movies for Grownups Awards	April 25, 2021				
AARP Movies for Grownups Awards	April 25, 2021	Best Actress	Sophia Loren	Won	
AARP Movies for Grownups Awards	April 25, 2021	Best Foreign Language Film	The Life Ahead	Nominated	
AARP Movies for Grownups Awards	April 25, 2021	Best Intergenerational Film	The Life Ahead	Nominated	
Alliance of Women Film Journalists Awards	January 4, 2021	Grand Dame Award For Defying Ageism	Sophia Loren	Won	
Black Reel Awards	April 11, 2021	Outstanding Foreign Film	Edoardo Ponti	Nominated	
Capri Hollywood International Film Festival	January 4, 2021				
Capri Hollywood International Film Festival	January 4, 2021	Best Actress	Sophia Loren	Won	
Capri Hollywood International Film Festival	January 4, 2021	Best Original Song	"Io sì (Seen)" (Diane Warren, Laura Pausini & Niccolò Agliardi)	Won	
Capri Hollywood International Film Festival	January 4, 2021	Best Adapted Screenplay	Edoardo Ponti	Won	
Critics' Choice Movie Awards	March 07, 2021				
Critics' Choice Movie Awards	March 07, 2021	Best Foreign Language Film	The Life Ahead	Nominated	
Critics' Choice Movie Awards	March 07, 2021	Best Song	"Io sì (Seen)" (Diane Warren, Laura Pausini & Niccolò Agliardi)	Nominated	
Critics' Choice Movie Awards	March 07, 2021	Best Young Performer	Ibrahima Gueye	Nominated	
David di Donatello	May 11, 2021	Best Actress in a Leading Role	Sophia Loren	Won	
David di Donatello	May 11, 2021	Best Original Song	"Io sì (Seen)" (Diane Warren, Laura Pausini & Niccolò Agliardi)	Nominated	
Georgia Film Critics Association Awards	March 11, 2021	Best Original Song	"Io sì (Seen)" (Diane Warren, Laura Pausini & Niccolò Agliardi)	Nominated	
GLAAD Media Awards	April 8, 2021	Outstanding Film – Limited Release	The Life Ahead	Nominated	
Golden Globe Awards	February 28, 2021				
Golden Globe Awards	February 28, 2021	Best Foreign Language Film	The Life Ahead	Nominated	
Golden Globe Awards	February 28, 2021	Best Original Song	"Io sì (Seen)" (Diane Warren, Laura Pausini & Niccolò Agliardi)	Won	
Hollywood Music in Media Awards	January 27, 2021	Best Original Song in a Feature Film	"Io sì (Seen)" (Diane Warren, Laura Pausini & Niccolò Agliardi)	Won	
Hollywood Music in Media Awards	January 27, 2021	Best Music Supervision – Film	Bonnie Greenberg	Won	
Houston Film Critics Society Awards	January 18, 2021	Best Original Song	"Io sì (Seen)" (Diane Warren, Laura Pausini & Niccolò Agliardi)	Nominated	
Motion Picture Sound Editors Awards	April 16, 2021	Outstanding Achievement in Sound Editing – Foreign Language Feature	Maurizio Argentieri, Riccardo Righini and Mauro Eusepi	Nominated	
NAACP Image Awards	March 27, 2021	Outstanding International Motion Picture	The Life Ahead	Nominated	
San Diego Film Critics Society Awards	January 11, 2021	Best International Film	The Life Ahead	Won	
Satellite Awards	February 15, 2021				
Satellite Awards	February 15, 2021	Best Actress in a Motion Picture – Drama	Sophia Loren	Nominated	
Satellite Awards	February 15, 2021	Best Original Song	"Io sì (Seen)" (Diane Warren, Laura Pausini & Niccolò Agliardi)	Won	
Satellite Awards	February 15, 2021	Best Adapted Screenplay	Edoardo Ponti	Nominated	
