= Amore (Alessandra Mussolini album) =

Studio album by Alessandra Mussolini
- Released: 21 August 1982
- Studio: Alfa Studio "A", Shibaura, Minato, Tokyo
- Genre: Pop; city pop; italo disco
- Length: 31:06
- Language: Japanese, Italian, English
- Label: Alfa Records
- Producer: Mickey Curtis

Singles from Amore
- 1. "Love Is Love" Released: 21 May 1982; 2. "Tokyo Fantasy" Released: 5 July 1982

Amore (Italian for 'Love') is the only studio album by Alessandra Mussolini, released on 21 August 1982 by Alfa Records.

The album was released in Japan only.

== Composition ==
The album is composed of eight tracks written in Japanese, Italian, and English.

In 1982 with the song titled "Love Is Love" from album she competed at the 11th Tokyo Music Festival (held at the Budokan), winning a "silver" award.

The title track "Tokyo Fantasy", was used in a 1982 Casio advertisement in which Mussolini herself took part. In 1984, the Japanese singer Sheena recorded a cover version of the song.

Before music spread on the web, making the songs much more available, the album was highly sought after by collectors both for the "particular" nature of the artist and for its rarity: in 2000, the LP record was sold in London for £4,500 GBP (₤10,000,000 ITL).

During interviews in 2020s, Alessandra Mussolini has often returned to mention the song "Tokyo Fantasy" and the experience singing in Japanese, when her mother gave a positive answer when asked if the daughter could sing, even though Mussolini had never sung before.

In 2026, thanks to Mussolini's participation in the eighth season of Italy's Celebrity Big Brother (that she won), "Tokyo Fantasy" regained popularity on social media.

== Track listing ==
No.	Title	Lyrics	Music	Length
1.	"Tokyo Fantasy"	Yukinojo Mori	Kisaburō Suzuki	3:42
2.	"Carta vincente"	Gerardo Carmine Gargiulo	Gianni Belfiore	3:53
3.	"Amai kioku (甘い記憶)"	Yukinojo Mori	Yūsuke Hoguchi	4:50
4.	"Insieme insieme"	Cristiano Malgioglio	Seiji Toda	4:00
5.	"Love Is Love (ラヴ・イズ・ラヴ)"	Yaïr Klinger	Yaïr Klinger	4:01
6.	"E stasera mi manchi"	Cristiano Malgioglio	Seiji Toda	3:34
7.	"Tears"	Yaïr Klinger	Yaïr Klinger	3:54
8.	"L'ultima notte d'amore"	Cristiano Malgioglio	Kaoru Ueda	3:19
Total length:				31:06
