= The Life Before Us =

Novel by Romain Gary (Émile Ajar)

First edition (publ. Mercure de France)

The Life Before Us (1975; French: La Vie devant soi) is a novel by French author Romain Gary, who published it under the pseudonym of "Emile Ajar". It was originally published in English as Momo, translated by Ralph Manheim. In 1986 it was re-published as The Life Before Us. It won the Prix Goncourt in 1975.

== Synopsis ==
Momo, a Muslim orphan boy who is about 10 years old, lives under the care of an old Jewish woman named Madame Rosa, who was a prisoner at Auschwitz and later became a prostitute in Paris. Momo's mother abandoned him with Madame Rosa, who is essentially a babysitter for the children of prostitutes. They live on the sixth floor of an apartment building in Belleville, a district of Paris. In their apartment building, Madame Rosa made a small hideout in a cellar, where she keeps artifacts of her Jewish heritage. The young boy tells the story of his life in the orphanage and of his relationship with Madame Rosa as she becomes increasingly sick, culminating with her death, after she had expressed her desire to not die in hospital on life support, saying that she does not want to be a vegetable being forced to live.

== Characters ==
- Momo, a young Muslim orphan
- Madame Rosa, a babysitter for the children of prostitutes
- Madame Lola, a transgender prostitute and former boxing champion in Senegal
- Monsieur Hamil, an old carpet salesman
- Monsieur N'da Amédée, a procurer
- Doctor Katz, the local doctor

== Themes ==
The book deals with several themes, including euthanasia, prostitution, the effects of the Holocaust, immigration and aging.

== Adaptations ==
The novel was adapted for cinema by Israeli director Moshé Mizrahi as Madame Rosa in 1977. The film won the Academy Award for Best Foreign Language Film, and Simone Signoret won the César Award for Best Actress for her performance as Madame Rosa. The novel was adapted for television in 2010 by Myriam Boyer, who also plays Madame Rosa. In 1987, American director Harold Prince staged a short-lived musical version on Broadway under the title Roza with a libretto and lyrics by Julian More and music by Gilbert Becaud.

On November 13, 2020, Netflix released The Life Ahead directed by Edoardo Ponti and starring Sophia Loren.

== Ban in Iran ==
The novel was first published in Iran in 1975 before the 1979 Islamic Revolution. It was banned for around 10 years after the revolution. Then the ban was removed and it was published several times afterwards. However, "The Life Before Us" was banned again during the tenure of Iranian President Mahmoud Ahmadinejad. The book finally hit the shelves in Iran again after a 13-year ban in September 2018. “With the publication of this book, I feel like a loved one has been released from prison and now I have come to visit him,” said Lili Golestan, the translator of the book into Persian, after the ban was lifted.

== Trivia ==
The book has a major part in the South Korean crime television series Nobody Knows from 2020. As the TV series progresses, parts of the book are cited, and additionally, one of the victims of the crime series left a clue in the book to the protagonist.
