= Maria Scicolone =

Italian television personality, columnist and singer (born 1938)

- Born: Marianna Pia Villani; 11 May 1938 (age 88); Rome, Kingdom of Italy
- Occupations: Television personality; columnist; singer
- Spouse: Romano Mussolini (m. 1962; div. 1971)
- Children: Alessandra Mussolini; Elisabetta Mussolini
- Relatives: Sophia Loren (sister)

Marianna Pia "Maria" Villani Scicolone (born Villani, 11 May 1938) is an Italian television personality, columnist and singer.

Scicolone was born in Rome to Romilda Villani and Riccardo Scicolone Murillo, and grew up between Pozzuoli and Naples with her mother and her elder sister, actress Sophia Loren. Her father only recognized her years later upon payment by Loren.

Scicolone is the first wife of Romano Mussolini (son of Italian fascist dictator Benito Mussolini), whom she married in 1962 and with whom she had two daughters: Alessandra and Elisabetta.

== Biography ==
She was born in Rome in 1938 to piano teacher Romilda Villani and Riccardo Scicolone, the couple's second child. The parents were not married, and after living together in Rome, where the couple's first daughter, Sofia Costanza Brigida Villani Scicolone (later known as Sophia Loren), was born, the man left his partner and returned to Pozzuoli to the family home. While Riccardo recognized his first daughter, who grew up in his home in Rome, he did not initially recognize Maria, who grew up in her grandparents' home.

She attended elementary school in Pozzuoli under the name Maria Villani (her mother's surname), but was forced by her mother Romilda to interrupt her studies and follow her to Rome, where she had already moved with Sofia for a successful audition at Cinecittà. When they reached the capital, young Maria was forced to remain locked in her room . Although she was eager to finish her studies, she was prevented from doing so because it was considered inappropriate for the sister of the then promising actress Sofia Scicolone to attend middle school under the name Maria Villani, as she was not recognized by her father.

However, when her father Riccardo, who had fallen into debt due to unsuccessful real estate deals, asked Romilda for a loan of two million lire through his now famous daughter Sofia, the sum was granted only in exchange for the recognition of Maria. After becoming Maria Scicolone, she obtained her middle school diploma at the age of twenty and managed to complete her studies, graduating with a degree in literature in 1976 at the age of thirty-eight.

She often accompanied her sister Sofia and her producer and partner Carlo Ponti around film sets around the world, including Spain and Hollywood, Los Angeles. Thanks to her singing and culinary talents, she also became known internationally, performing duets, albeit for fun, as she herself stated, with Frank Sinatra, who offered her an audition to participate in one of his future albums, predicting a brilliant career for her. In 1972, he recorded the song Non finisce mai, the closing theme song for the miniseries La donna di picche.

== See also ==
- Mussolini family

== Bibliography ==
- A tavola con il Duce: ricette e racconti inediti di casa Mussolini (in Italian). Rome: Gremese. 2004. ISBN 9788884403247.
- La mia casa è piena di specchi (in Italian). Rome: Gremese. 2004. ISBN 9788884402974.
- La cucina delle mie certezze (in Italian). Segrate: Mondadori. 2008. ISBN 9788804582656.
