= Romano Floriani Mussolini =

Italian footballer (born 2003)

Personal information
- Full name: Romano Benito Floriani Mussolini
- Date of birth: 27 January 2003 (age 23)
- Place of birth: Rome, Lazio, Italy
- Height: 1.88 m (6 ft 2 in)
- Positions: Right-back; right midfielder

Team information
- Current team: Lazio
- Number: 15

Youth career
- –2016: Roma
- 2016–2022: Lazio
- 2018: → Vigor Perconti (loan)

Senior career*
Years	Team	Apps	(Gls)
2022–	Lazio	9	(1)
2023–2024	→ Pescara (loan)	26	(0)
2024–2025	→ Juve Stabia (loan)	33	(1)
2025–2026	→ Cremonese (loan)	28	(0)
- * Club domestic league appearances and goals as of 19:33, 27 October 2026 (UTC)

Romano Benito Floriani Mussolini (born 27 January 2003), also referred to as Mussolini Jr. by Italian media, is an Italian professional footballer who plays as a right-back for Serie A club Lazio. He is the son of politician Alessandra Mussolini, the grandson of pianist Romano Mussolini, and the great-grandson of the Italian fascist dictator Benito Mussolini.

== Early life and family ==
Floriani Mussolini was born in Rome, Lazio Region, in 2003 as the third child of Mauro Floriani and politician Alessandra Mussolini. His grandfather, Romano Mussolini, was a pianist, and his great-grandfather was Italian fascist dictator Benito Mussolini. His great-aunt is actress Sophia Loren. He has a double surname as a result. This was done as an exception to Italian name customs with Italian civil authorities and Catholic Church agreeing to it at his baptism as double surnames were not usually allowed under Italian law at the time of his birth.

== Career ==
Floriani Mussolini started his football career in the youth system of Roma before moving to Lazio at age 13. Whilst at Lazio, he was loaned out in 2018 to amateur club Vigor Perconti. This came after he did not get any game time at Lazio for two years before he made his debut for the under-17s.

When asked if his surname would affect his playing time, Lazio's youth coach Mauro Bianchessi stated: "The burdensome surname? I've never spoken to his parents, and the only thing that matters is whether a player deserves to play. Nothing else." Despite this, he wears either his given name or "Floriani M." on the back of his shirts. In March 2021, he signed his first professional contract with Lazio until 2024. He was first called up to Lazio's first team on 24 October 2021, in a Serie A game against Hellas Verona as an unused substitute.

On 3 August 2023, Lazio announced to have loaned Floriani Mussolini to Serie C club Pescara, a team coached by former Biancazzurri boss Zdeněk Zeman. On 5 July 2024, he joined Serie B side Juve Stabia on loan. Later that year on 22 December, he scored his first goal in a 1–0 victory over Cesena. During the goal celebration, the stadium announcer called out his first name, "Romano", seven times, with fans responding by chanting "Mussolini" and giving fascist salutes. On 14 July 2025, he moved on a new loan to Serie A club Cremonese, with an option to buy. A month later, on 29 August, he made his Serie A debut in a 3–2 victory over Sassuolo. Following his return to Lazio, he made his Serie A debut for the club in a 1–0 away win over Bologna on 24 August 2026.

== Personal life ==
Floriani Mussolini gained attention after appearing on television with his mother on Ballando con le Stelle. Despite his surname and lineage, he expressed no interest in politics. He was educated at St. George's British International School in Rome, and signed for Lazio whilst still studying.

== Career statistics ==
As of match played 27 October 2026

Appearances and goals by club, season and competition
Club	Season	League			Coppa Italia		Other		Total	
Club	Season	Division	Apps	Goals	Apps	Goals	Apps	Goals	Apps	Goals
Lazio	2022–23	Serie A	0	0	0	0	–		0	0
Lazio	2026–27	Serie A	9	1	0	0	–		9	1
Lazio	Total		9	1	0	0	–		9	1
Pescara (loan)	2023–24	Serie C	26	0	–		4 (Note: Two appearances in Coppa Italia Serie C, two appearances in Serie C promotion play-offs)	0	30	0
Juve Stabia (loan)	2024–25	Serie B	36	1	1	0	–		37	1
Cremonese (loan)	2025–26	Serie A	28	0	1	0	–		29	0
Career total			99	2	2	0	4	0	105	2
