= Between Strangers =

- Theatrical release poster
- Directed by: Edoardo Ponti
- Written by: Edoardo Ponti
- Produced by: Gabriella Martinelli; Elda Ferri
- Starring: Klaus Maria Brandauer; Gérard Depardieu; Sophia Loren; Malcolm McDowell; Pete Postlethwaite; Mira Sorvino; Deborah Kara Unger
- Cinematography: Gregory Middleton
- Edited by: Roberto Silvi
- Music by: Zbigniew Preisner
- Distributed by: Overseas FilmGroup
- Release dates: August 30, 2002 (Venice Film Festival); October 4, 2002 (United States)
- Running time: 95 minutes
- Countries: Canada; Italy
- Language: English

Between Strangers is a 2002 film written and directed by Edoardo Ponti. It stars an ensemble cast including Sophia Loren, Mira Sorvino, Deborah Kara Unger, Pete Postlethwaite, Klaus Maria Brandauer, and Malcolm McDowell. It premiered at the Venice Film Festival and received a limited release on October 4, 2002.

== Plot ==
Three women in Toronto confront emotional crises regarding the men in their lives. Olivia looks after her husband John, a wheelchair user. Olivia has aspired to a career as an artist, but John believes she is wasting her time. Olivia finds encouragement from an unlikely source, Max, an eccentric French gardener. Olivia also harbors a secret about a daughter she gave up for adoption back in Italy; her anxieties about this secret are manifest in her drawings.

Natalia is a news photographer who, on assignment in Angola, took a portrait of a crying child orphaned by war. Her father Alexander, also a well-known photojournalist, is proud of Natalia when her photo appears on the cover of a news magazine, but she is haunted by the fact that while she made the child famous, she couldn't save her life.

Catherine is a world-famous cello player from New York who has come to Toronto to record an album. She has never been able to resolve her relationship with her father, Alan, who beat her mother to death when she was a child. When Alan is released from prison, she's willing to abandon her husband, children and career as a musician to track him down and kill him, unable to accept that he's a changed man.

== Cast ==
- Sophia Loren as Olivia
- Mira Sorvino as Natalia Bauer
- Deborah Kara Unger as Catherine
- Pete Postlethwaite as John
- Julian Richings as Nigel
- Klaus Maria Brandauer as Alexander Bauer
- Malcolm McDowell as Alan Baxter
- Gérard Depardieu as Max
- Wendy Crewson as Amanda Trent
- Len Doncheff as Grocery Store Owner
- Corey Sevier as Jeb
- Kathryn Winslow as Maria

== Production ==
Between Strangers was filmed in the summer of 2001 at Edwards Gardens and the R.C. Harris Water Treatment Plant in Toronto.

== Critical reception ==
Liam Lacey of The Globe and Mail wrote, "Between Strangers has a few things going for it: Loren's wonderful face, for example, which suggests a wild natural landscape rather than mere flesh and bone, and makes an intriguing contrast with Unger's symmetrical features and turned-to-stone stare. Moment by moment, too, the acting is solid, but the supporting characters are barely sketched in, and script is too schematic and earnest to hold interest. By the time each woman confronts the middle-aged man who has exerted tyranny over her life, you are weary of this suffocating Euro-angst."
