= Madame Rosa =

1977 film directed by Moshé Mizrahi

- Film poster
- Directed by: Moshé Mizrahi
- Written by: Moshé Mizrahi
- Produced by: Jean Bolvary
- Starring: Simone Signoret; Michal Bat-Adam; Samy Ben-Youb; Gabriel Jabbour; Geneviève Fontanel
- Cinematography: Néstor Almendros
- Edited by: Sophie Coussein
- Music by: Dabket Loubna; Philippe Sarde
- Distributed by: Warner Bros. (through Warner-Columbia Film)
- Release date: 2 November 1977
- Running time: 105 minutes
- Country: France
- Language: French
- Box office: $2.6 million

Madame Rosa (French: La vie devant soi) is a 1977 French drama film directed by Moshé Mizrahi, adapted from the 1975 novel The Life Before Us by Romain Gary. It stars Simone Signoret and Samy Ben-Youb, and tells the story of an elderly Jewish woman and former prostitute in Paris who cares for a number of children, including an adolescent Algerian boy. The film required a transformation in Signoret's appearance as Madame Rosa.

The film was viewed in context of Arab–Israeli conflicts, and received positive reviews. It won the Academy Award for Best Foreign Language Film, while Signoret won the César Award for Best Actress for her performance.

== Plot ==
In Belleville, Paris, Madame Rosa, an elderly French Jew and Holocaust survivor who worked as a prostitute, now runs a boarding home for the children of prostitutes. One of them is Momo, an Algerian boy who is believed to be 11. Although Madame Rosa is Jewish and sometimes makes racist comments about Momo, she raises Momo as a Muslim in respect of his heritage, taking him to her friend Mr. Hamil for instruction in religion, French literature, and Arabic at the Grand Mosque. She is in fact concealing the fact that Momo is 14, expressing strong skepticism about official documents and what they can or cannot prove, and, as a result, is unable to send him to a regular primary school.

Momo steals a dog from a pet shop. He later impulsively sells the dog for 500 francs and stuffs the money into the sewer. Rosa, who regards Momo as a troublemaker, takes him to her physician Dr. Katz under the belief that he is syphilitic or mentally ill. Momo later follows her after she has a nightmare about the Auschwitz concentration camp to discover her hidden Jewish space under the staircase, and the two begin to develop a closer bond. Later, after Momo dresses himself up as a prostitute and a real prostitute takes him to a cafe run by a friend of Madame Rosa's believing that he needs help, Madame Rosa makes Momo swear never to prostitute himself or become a procurer. In a park, Momo meets a female film editor, and she tells him he can visit her lab any time he likes.

Madame Rosa is in exceedingly poor health and begins experiencing dementia, at times having flashbacks to the Vel d’Hiv roundup and falling back into the belief that she will be arrested by the French Police and sent back to Auschwitz. Mr. Hamil also begins to have dementia, taking solace in the writings of Victor Hugo. After she has a bad fall on the stairs, Dr. Katz informs Momo that she has many health issues including hypertension. She refuses to be hospitalized. Momo believes she should be euthanized. When told by Dr. Katz that euthanasia contradicts French values, Momo replies he is not French and that Algerians believe in self-determination. Momo's father, who spent time in an asylum after murdering Momo's mother, returns to try to collect Momo, but Madame Rosa tricks him into believing that she raised him as a Jew and he suffers a fatal stroke. Momo is with Madame Rosa when she retreats to her Jewish space under the staircase to die, and is discovered with her body three weeks later. Afterwards, he goes to live with the film editor.

== Cast ==
- Simone Signoret as Madame Rosa
- Samy Ben Youb as Momo
- Elio Bencoil as Moïse
- Claude Dauphin as Dr. Katz
- Stella Annicette as Madame Lola
- Gabriel Jabbour as Monsieur Hamil
- Michal Bat-Adam as Nadine
- Costa-Gavras as Ramon
- Geneviève Fontanel as Maryse
- Bernard La Jarrige as Louis Charmette
- El Kebir as Monsieur Mimoun
- Ibrahim Seck as N'da Amédée
- Mohamed Zinet as Kadir Youssef

== Production ==
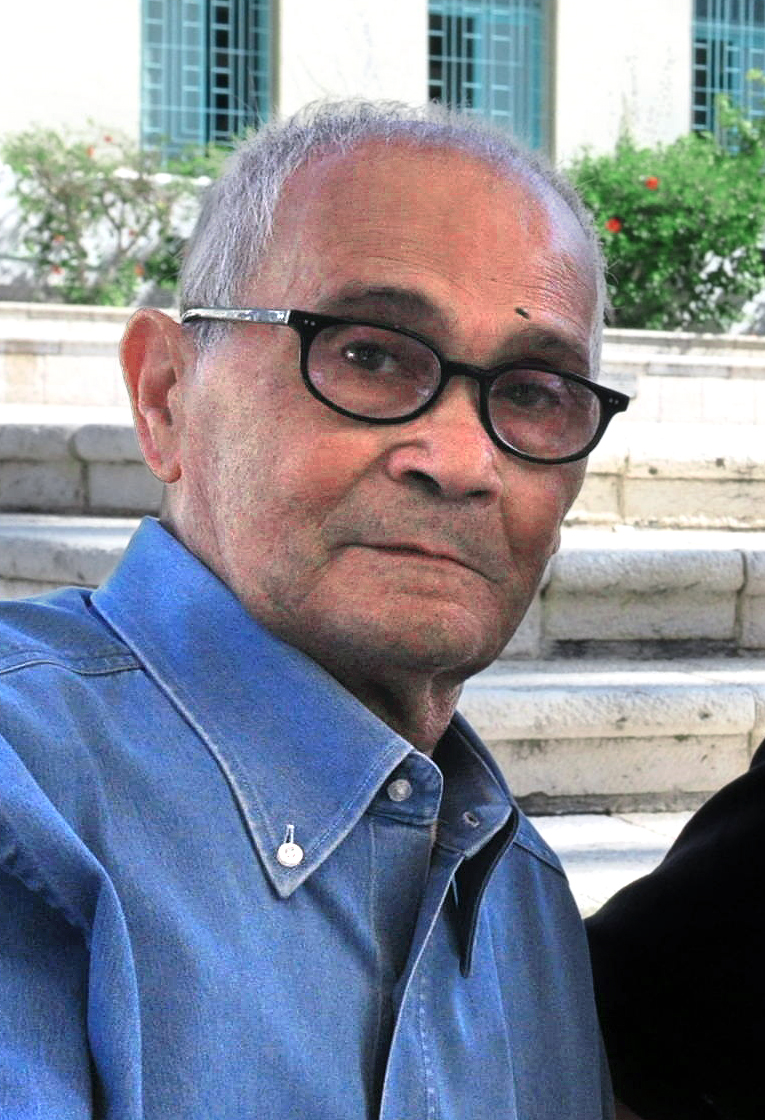
Israeli director Moshé Mizrahi made the film after moving to France.

Israeli director Moshé Mizrahi made the film after moving to France. While the film was based on a novel, Mizrahi was also inspired to make the film from having been raised in Egypt, Israel and Palestine. As actress Simone Signoret said: "He's immersed in the two cultures, Arab and Jews. They're his two loves".

=== Casting ===
Signoret, who starred as Madame Rosa, was initially advised by her husband Yves Montand not to take the role, and refused it for a year. Signoret explained why she was eventually persuaded to play the part, saying, "A role like that comes every 20 years. It is a cake. She is everything— liar, sincere, gourmand, poor, stupid, intelligent, warm, nasty. And she dies on top of that. If I had said 'no,' and another woman had played it, I would have been sick".

She had to gain significant weight for the part, with Mizrahi choosing undersized dresses with floral decorations to accentuate the weight gain. Signoret was in her 50s at the time, and was made to appear 10 years older, with her wrinkles accentuated and her cheeks widened with cotton. Her legs were also padded.

== Reception ==
=== Box office ===
With two million viewers, La vie devant soi was a great success in France. Its success may have been aided by the popularity of the TV series Madame le juge, which Signoret starred in.

The film opened on 19 March 1978 at the Plaza Theater in New York City. It made $5.2 million in the United States.

=== Critical reception ===
Madame Rosa met "acclaim" in North America. Vincent Canby, writing for The New York Times, judged that Moshé Mizrahi's direction of the film was beautiful, and Madame Rosa was "a tremendous character", Signoret's "best role in years". Molly Haskell, writing for New York, interpreted the story as "a wishful fable of Israeli-Arab reconciliation", and said it "managed to get to" her. The Wisconsin Jewish Chronicle praised it as "an unforgettable film", asking, "How can a film about pimps, whores, transvestites and average people who populate Belleville in France be a film about love and human kindness? ...It's a story of warmth and understanding between Arab and Jew". Anna Simons of The Harvard Crimson stated the film "is carried to near perfection by Simone Signoret's brilliant rendition of Madame Rosa and Samy Ben Youb's impressive performance as Momo".

James Monaco's 1992 The Movie Guide, reviewing the VHS, gave Madame Rosa three and a half stars, stating it "handles its underlying conflicts—between Arabs and Jews, between Nazis and Jews—well, and explores its mixed racial and cultural milieu with grace, sensitivity and subtlety". In 2013, Xavier Leherpeur of L'Express described Signoret as unforgettable in the film. In his 2015 Movie Guide, Leonard Maltin gave it two and a half stars, describing it as "aimless".

Madame Rosa has an approval rating of 89% on review aggregator website Rotten Tomatoes, based on 9 reviews, and an average rating of 7.4/10.

=== Accolades ===
Madame Rosa's release, at a time when U.S. President Jimmy Carter was negotiating a peace between Egyptian President Anwar Sadat and Israeli Prime Minister Menachem Begin, boosted its campaign at the Academy Awards, where it ultimately won for Best Foreign Language Film. While the film represented France, Mizrahi became the first Israeli director whose film won the award. Critic Molly Haskell believed the award, "in the principle of compensation", was balanced by Vanessa Redgrave winning the Academy Award for Best Supporting Actress, allowing Redgrave to make a controversial statement in favour of the Palestine Liberation Organization. In response to Redgrave's speech, Mizrahi commented, "Basically, she's right". In France, Signoret won the César Award for Best Actress, which she had not received before.

| Award | Date of ceremony | Category | Recipient(s) | Result | Ref(s) |
|---|---|---|---|---|---|
| Academy Awards | 3 April 1978 | Best Foreign Language Film | France | Won | |
| César Awards | 4 February 1978 | Best Actress | Simone Signoret | Won | |
| César Awards | 4 February 1978 | Best Production Design | Bernard Evein | Nominated | |
| César Awards | 4 February 1978 | Best Sound | Jean-Pierre Ruh | Nominated | |
| Golden Globes | 28 January 1978 | Best Foreign Language Film | Madame Rosa | Nominated | |
| Los Angeles Film Critics Association | 16 December 1978 | Best Foreign Language Film | Moshé Mizrahi | Won | |

== See also ==
- List of submissions to the 50th Academy Awards for Best Foreign Language Film
- List of French submissions for the Academy Award for Best Foreign Language Film
- The Life Ahead
