= Edoardo Ponti =

Italian-American film director (born 1973)

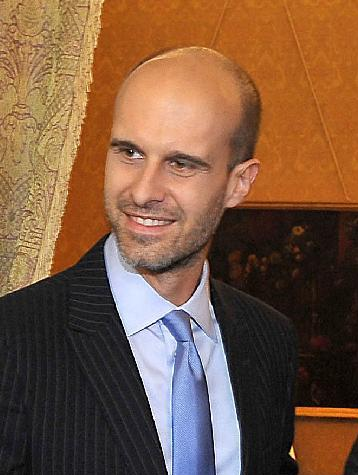
- Ponti in 2011
- Born: Edoardo Ponti; 6 January 1973 (age 53); Geneva, Switzerland
- Education: University of Southern California (B.A., 1998; MFA)
- Occupations: Director; writer; producer; actor
- Years active: 1998–present
- Spouse: Sasha Alexander (m. 2007)
- Children: 2
- Parents: Carlo Ponti Sr. (father); Sophia Loren (mother)
- Relatives: Carlo Ponti Jr. (brother); Alessandra Mussolini (cousin)

Edoardo Ponti (born 6 January 1973) is an Italian-American film director and producer. He is the younger son of actress Sophia Loren and producer Carlo Ponti Sr. and the brother of conductor Carlo Ponti Jr.

== Early life and education ==
Ponti was born on 6 January 1973 in Geneva, Switzerland to actress Sophia Loren and film producer Carlo Ponti Sr., and was also raised there.

Ponti studied at Aiglon College in Switzerland and graduated in 1990. In 1994, Ponti graduated magna cum laude from the University of Southern California with a Bachelor of Arts degree in English Literature and Creative Writing. In 1998, Ponti earned his Master of Fine Arts degree in Film Directing & Production from the University of Southern California School of Cinema and Television.

== Career ==
Between Strangers was the first feature film which Ponti wrote and directed. It was produced by Gabriella Martinelli and starred an ensemble cast which included Sophia Loren (his mother), Mira Sorvino, Deborah Kara Unger, Gérard Depardieu, Pete Postlethwaite, and Malcolm McDowell. The film premiered at the Venice and Toronto International Film Festivals. It won five Genie nominations, the Canadian equivalent to the Academy Award. Ponti earned the best first-time filmmaker award from the Newport Beach Film Festival, as well as an award of merit from the Los Angeles Italian Film Festival.

In 2011, Ponti wrote and directed the romantic comedy Coming & Going starring Rhys Darby, Fionnula Flanagan, and Sasha Alexander, as well as Away we Stay, a branded short for W Hotel Chain starring Helena Christensen and David Gandy, which premiered in London.

In 2012, Ponti directed Il Turno di Notte lo fanno le stelle, his first Italian-language film, written by Erri De Luca, and starring Nastassja Kinski, Enrico Lo Verso, and Julian Sands. The same year, he starred as an actor in Michel Comte's directorial debut, a film adaptation of Madam Butterfly, in which he played the lead character, Pinkerton.

In 2014, he directed Voce umana (Human Voice), a short film adaptation of Jean Cocteau’s one-act play The Human Voice, starring Sophia Loren. He was also attached to direct the British motion picture Payment Deferred starring Malcolm McDowell based on CS Forester’s bestselling novel and the period piece Behind her Smile produced by Fred Roos.

Ponti’s past film credits include a starring role in the film Aurora directed by Maurizio Ponzi, for which he earned a "Nastro d’Argento" nomination, Italy's prestigious film critics' prize. The first short Ponti wrote and directed, Liv, was executive produced by Robert Altman and Michelangelo Antonioni, and was premiered at the Venice International Film Festival.

Ponti also produced and directed Eugène Ionesco's play The Lesson. He then went on to adapt for the stage, produce, and direct Nick Bantock’s best-selling epistolary trilogy Griffin & Sabine at the Spoleto Theatre Festival in Italy. He wrote and directed an opera with renowned Polish composer Zbigniew Preisner titled Requiem for my Friend, for which Warner Bros. awarded Ponti a platinum record.

Ponti next directed The Life Ahead starring Loren, Ibrahima Gueye, Abril Zamora, Renato Carpentieri and Babak Karimi, based upon the novel The Life Before Us by Romain Gary, for Netflix.

=== Other ventures ===
In 2008, Ponti co-founded TakeHollywood.com, an online service which provides knowledge to those wanting to enter the world of show business from A-list actors, directors, producers, casting directors, managers, and agents.

== Personal life ==
Ponti is fluent in English, French, and Italian. In his late teens, he dated Chiara Mastroianni, daughter of Marcello Mastroianni and Catherine Deneuve.

On 12 August 2007, Ponti married actress Sasha Alexander in Geneva. They have two children, Lucia Sofia Ponti (born 12 May 2006) and Leonardo Fortunato Ponti (born 20 December 2010).

== Filmography ==
- Aurora (1984)
- Liv (1998)
- Between Strangers (2002)
- Coming & Going (2011)
- Away we stay (2011)
- The Nightshift Belongs to the Stars (2012)
- The Girl from Nagasaki (2013) - Lt. Pinkerton
- Human Voice (Voce umana) (2014) - Director, writer
- The Life Ahead (2020) - Director, writer
