= Alessandra Mussolini =

Italian politician (born 1962)

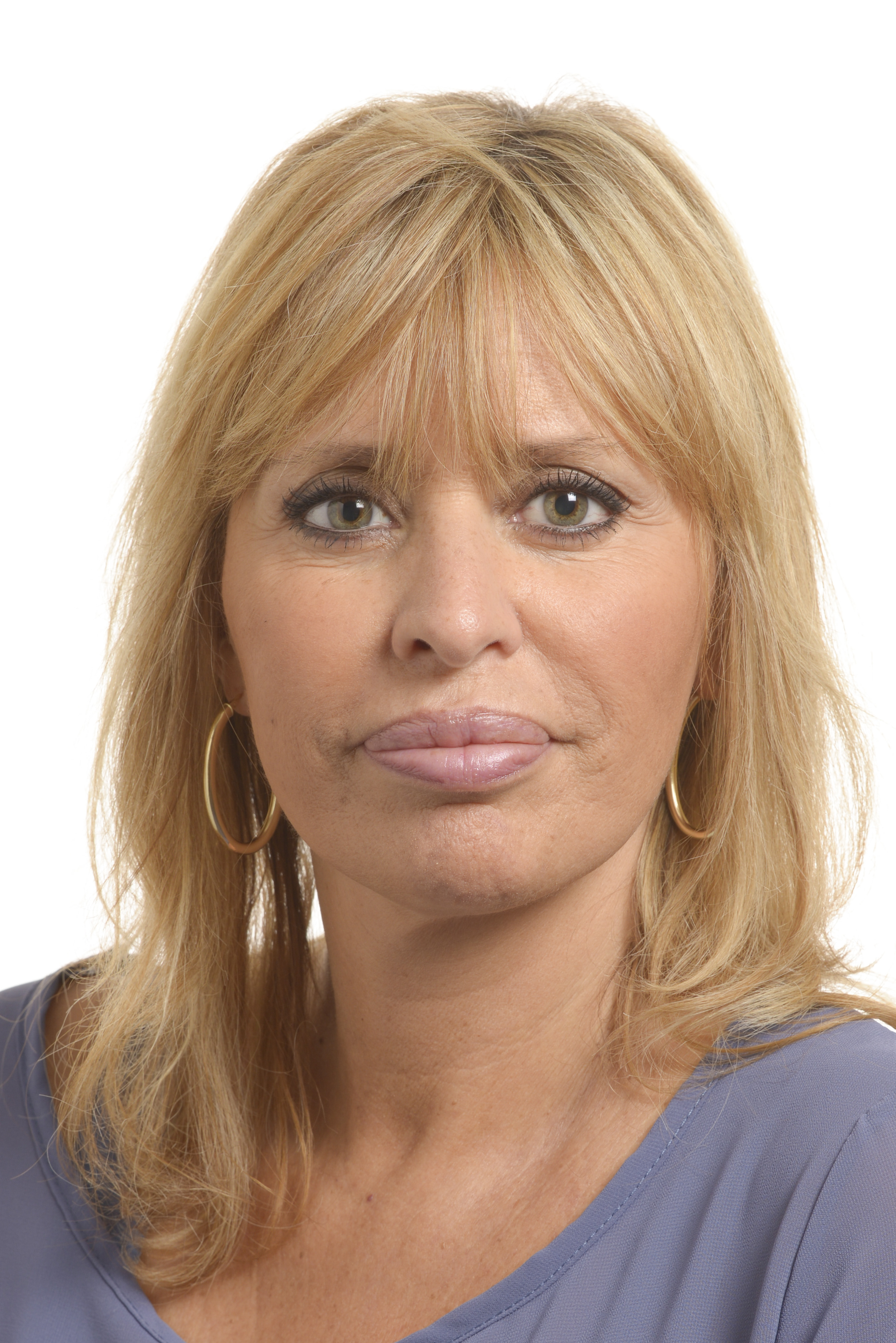
- Official portrait, 2014

Member of the European Parliament for Central Italy
- In office 2 November 2022 – 15 July 2024
- In office 1 July 2014 – 1 July 2019
- In office 20 July 2004 – 28 April 2008

Member of the Senate of the Republic
- In office 15 March 2013 – 30 June 2014
- Constituency: Campania

Member of the Chamber of Deputies
- In office 29 April 2008 – 14 March 2013
- Constituency: Campania 1
- In office 23 April 1992 – 19 July 2004
- Constituency: Naples

Personal details
- Born: 30 December 1962 (age 63) Rome, Italy
- Party: Independent (2025–present)
- Other political affiliations: MSI (1992–1995); AN (1995–2003); AS (2003–2009); AS (2004–2006); PdL (2009–2013); FI (2013–2018; 2019–2025)
- Spouse: Mauro Floriani (m. 1989)
- Children: 3, including Romano
- Parent(s): Romano Mussolini (father); Maria Scicolone (mother)
- Relatives: Mussolini family Sophia Loren (aunt); Rachele Mussolini (half-sister)
- Education: Sapienza University of Rome
- Occupation: Politician; Actress (1970–2006)

Alessandra Mussolini (born 30 December 1962) is an Italian politician, television personality, model and former actress and singer. Mussolini has been a member of both houses of the Italian Parliament as well as the European Parliament. She is also known for being a member of the Mussolini family as a granddaughter of Benito Mussolini. Until 2024, she was a Member of the European Parliament for Forza Italia.

Mussolini first gained fame through acting and modelling. In 1982, as a singer, she released a city pop album entitled Amore. Mussolini starred in her final film in 1990 and left the industry after a producer asked her to change her name.

In 2004, she became the first woman to lead a political party in Italy when she founded the national conservative political party Social Action. She was a member of the Chamber of Deputies from 2008 to 2013 and the Italian Senate from 2013 to 2014 where she was elected under The People of Freedom which later became part of Forza Italia. She was elected to the European Parliament in 2014.

Mussolini left politics temporarily in December 2020 for a reality television career. She returned as an MEP in November 2022, succeeding Antonio Tajani, after he was appointed in the Meloni government.

== Early and personal life ==
Alessandra Mussolini was born in Rome, the daughter of Romano Mussolini, the fourth child of Benito Mussolini, fascist dictator of Italy from 1922 to 1943, and Marianna Pia Villani Scicolone (born 11 May 1938, Rome). Actress Sophia Loren is her maternal aunt. She has a half-sister, Rachele Mussolini, who is also a politician as a member of Brothers of Italy.

From 1976 to 1980 she went to high school at the American Overseas School of Rome. She graduated in 1994 from Sapienza University of Rome, where she got her Master of Science in medicine and surgery.

She married customs policeman Mauro Floriani on 28 October 1989. Contrary to tradition, she proposed to him. Together they have three children, Caterina, Clarissa, and Romano — the last named after his grandfather. Later, the children adopted their mother's surname, but she went through a complex legal process to allow them to do so. She has since campaigned for Italian law to be changed to allow all children to take their mother's last name if they wish.

Her husband was one of the accused scheduled to appear in court for a child prostitution trial in 2015. In 2013, Floriani was one of around 50 men—among them celebrities, professionals, priests, journalists and politicians—who were accused of paying two teenage girls, aged 14 and 15, for sexual services in Rome. Wiretaps revealed he was one of the clients who contacted the girls most often. In 2015, Floriani pled guilty to soliciting the services of an underage prostitute, and received a one-year suspended sentence.

She is first cousin once-removed to Caio Giulio Cesare Mussolini, Benito Mussolini's great-grandson, who ran for the Fratelli d’Italia party in the 2019 European Parliament election. She considers herself Roman Catholic, although she does not attend Mass regularly.

In 2001, Mussolini was involved in an altercation while filming for a Porta a Porta talk show episode on sexual harassment. She was verbally accosted by Katia Bellillo, then Minister for Equal Opportunities, who got up and approached Mussolini. In response Mussolini verbally and physically attacked Bellillo, calling her an "ugly communist" who should "go and live in Cuba."

She has been a painter since 2014 and her first solo exhibition was held during 2015 in Rome.

== Entertainment career ==
Mussolini was taken under the wing of her aunt Sophia Loren for a while and started a career as an actress in the Italian film industry during the 1970s. A Special Day (1977), in which she had a minor role as "Maria Luisa," won an American Golden Globe Award for Best Foreign Language Film and was nominated for an Academy Award for Best Foreign Language Film.

During 1982, Mussolini released a Japanese pop/City pop album of songs under the title Amore on Alfa Records; the album was released only in Japan and has since become something of a collector's item. She also competed at the 11th Tokyo Music Festival (held at the Budokan), winning a "silver" award.

Mussolini also appeared as a glamour model, including on the cover of two European editions of Playboy, in Italy (August 1983) and Germany (November 1983). "When you are an actress, you are dealing with the body. Every actress does topless and stuff like this; you have to," she has said.

Mussolini continued as an actress into the 1980s. Some of the films she featured in were made for Italian television. However, she still acted in standard cinematic films, such as The Assisi Underground in which she played a nun; the movie focused on the Roman Catholic Church rescuing Italian Jews from the Nazis in 1943. She starred in her final film in 1990 and then left the film industry to continue studying after a producer asked her to change her name.

== Political career ==
=== Italian Parliament ===
In 1992, Alessandra Mussolini was elected to parliament in a Naples constituency as a member of the Movimento Sociale Italiano (MSI). After the Italian general elections of April 2008, Mussolini served as a member of the Italian parliament within Silvio Berlusconi's alliance of right wing parties, The People of Freedom.

In the Italian general election of February 2013, she was elected to the Senate of the Republic as a member of The People of Freedom. The party was transformed into a new Forza Italia in November 2013. In the 2014 European Parliament election, Mussolini was elected to the EP for Forza Italia.

=== Mayoral candidate ===
In 1993 Mussolini was a candidate for the post of mayor of Naples, but was defeated by Antonio Bassolino. She claimed that her relations with Gianfranco Fini, leader of the Alleanza Nazionale, never were very good; she then later withdrew, resigning over differences with him at least once. She unsuccessfully challenged him for the leadership of the party when he withdrew support for Mussolini in a television interview in January 2002.

=== Formation of Social Action ===
Mussolini suddenly left the National Alliance on 28 November 2003, following the visit of party leader and the Deputy Prime Minister Gianfranco Fini to Israel, where he described fascism as part "the absolute evil" with regard to the Holocaust as he apologised for Italy's role as an Axis Power during the Second World War. Mussolini, however, defended the right of Israel to exist and declared that the world "should beg forgiveness of Israel."

Following her resignation, Mussolini formed her Social Action party, originally named "Freedom of Action," and organised a coalition named Social Alternative. This made her the first female leader of an Italian political party. The move was read in the Italian media as surprising because of Mussolini's "progressive" stances on many issues, including abortion, artificial insemination, gay rights and civil unions. She has been an outspoken feminist and has been described by conservative commentators as a "socialist" and a "left-winger."

=== European Parliament ===
In the 2004 European Parliament election, Social Alternative, gained 1.2% of the electoral list vote. Mussolini herself received 133,000 preference votes.

In response to a comment made by UKIP MEP Godfrey Bloom in which he said that "No self-respecting small businessman with a brain in the right place would ever employ a lady of child-bearing age. That isn't politically correct, is it, but it's a fact of life. The more women's rights you have, it's actually a bar to their employment." and: "I just don't think [women] clean behind the fridge enough," Mussolini responded by saying

I know the English have a sense of humour about themselves, but I am from Naples and I can say that us women do know how to cook and clean the refrigerator and even be politicians, while perhaps Godfrey Bloom does not know either how to clean the refrigerator or how to be a politician.

In March 2005, Mussolini was banned by a local court from regional elections held the following month for presenting fraudulent signatures. "This is an affront to democracy, if they're going to exclude the Social Alternative they will have to exclude all the parties, because all the signature lists are false," Mussolini told Reuters. Mussolini went on a hunger strike to protest the decision. However, at the end of the month Italy's top administrative court, the Council of State, annulled the decision and she stood for election.

In November 2007, remarks by Mussolini triggered the collapse of the far-right Identity, Tradition, Sovereignty grouping within the European Parliament. Mussolini declared that all Romanians were criminals in remarks regarding immigration policy. This prompted delegates from the Greater Romania Party to quit the group, bringing the group below the minimum number of members to qualify as a caucus and receive Parliamentary funding. In the 2019 European Parliament election, she lost her bid for re-election to the European Parliament.

=== Views on social issues ===
In 2006, she responded to claims by the transgender Italian parliamentary candidate Vladimir Luxuria that she was a "fascist" by saying that it would be better to be a fascist than it would be to be gay ("frocio").

Her stance on homosexuality changed consistently from the late 2000s. In 2010, Mussolini condemned the Vatican's comparison of homosexuality with paedophilia, stating "You can't link sexual orientation to pedophilia … this link risks becoming dangerously misleading for the protection of children". In 2022, she supported the anti-homophobia "Zan bill" and she refused to provide her gender information on her MEP identity card after returning to the European Parliament.

=== End of political career ===
She left Forza Italia in 2018, following the party's decision to be in opposition to the Conte government. She has used Twitter to defend the memory of her grandfather from critics such as actor Jim Carrey, and fans of Scottish football club Celtic F.C.

In December 2020, she left politics for a new television career. She took part, as contestant, in Milly Carlucci's Ballando con le stelle and in Carlo Conti's Tale e quale show obtaining success.

=== Brief return to politics ===
In November 2022, Mussolini returned to politics to replace Antonio Tajani as a Forza Italia MEP after his election to the Chamber of Deputies. Mussolini ran again in 2024, but was not re-elected.

=== Return to television ===
From March to May 2026, Mussolini was a contestant on Celebrity Big Brother. She won the reality show with the 56% of the votes.

== Filmography ==
=== Films ===
Year	Title	Role	Notes
1972	White Sister	Sister Germana (child)	
1977	A Special Day	Maria Luisa	
1983	Il tassinaro	Donatella	
1985	The Assisi Underground	Beata	
1987	Noi uomini duri	Adua	
1987	Non scommettere mai con il cielo	Sister Angelica	
1990	HaDerekh LeEin Harod	Liora	

=== Television ===
Year	Title	Role	Notes
1981–1982	Domenica in	Herself / Co-host	Talk show (season 6)
1984	Aurora	Bride	Television movie
1986	Ferragosto OK	Jenny	Television movie
1987	Investigatori d'Italia	Cristina Carli	Episode: "L'inafferrabile mostro del Po"
1987	Investigatori d'Italia	Giuliana Drago	Episode: "L'omicidio del banchiere Galante"
1988	Vivere per vincere	Fiamma	Television movie
1990	Sabato, domenica e lunedì	Giulianella	Television movie
2006	La pupa e il secchione	Herself / Judge	Reality show (season 1)
2006	The Simpsons	Tammy (voice)	Episode: "The Last of the Red Hat Mamas" (Italian dub only)
2008–2021	Mattino Cinque	Herself / Opinionist	Talk show
2008–2021	Pomeriggio Cinque	Herself / Opinionist	Talk show
2012–2021	Domenica Live	Herself / Opinionist	Sunday-special talk show
2017–2025	L'aria che tira	Herself / Opinionist	Political talk show
2020–2021	Ballando con le Stelle	Herself / Contestant – Opinionist	Talent show (season 15–16)
2021–2026	Vita in diretta	Herself / Opinionist	Talk show
2021	Il cantante mascherato	Herself / Contestant	Talent show (season 2)
2022	Nudi per la vita	Herself / Contestant	TV special
2022	Tale e quale show	Herself / Contestant	Talent show (season 12)
2026	Grande Fratello VIP	Herself / Contestant – Winner	Reality show (season 8)

== Discography ==
=== Studio albums ===
Title	Notes
Amore	Released: 21 August 1982; Label: Alfa Records; Format: CD, LP, digital download

=== Singles ===
Title	Year	Album
"Love Is Love"	21 May 1982	Amore
"Tokyo Fantasy"	5 July 1982	Amore

== Electoral history ==
Election	House	Constituency	Party	Votes	Result
1992	Chamber of Deputies	Naples–Caserta	MSI	56,716	Elected
1994	Chamber of Deputies	Naples – Ischia	AN	39,736	Elected
1996	Chamber of Deputies	Naples – Ischia	AN	42,249	Elected
2001	Chamber of Deputies	Naples – Ischia	AN	36,902	Elected
2004	European Parliament	Central Italy	AS	39,823	Elected
2006	Chamber of Deputies	Campania 1	AS	– (Note: Elected in a closed list proportional representation system.)	Not elected
2008	Chamber of Deputies	Campania 1	PdL	–	Elected
2013	Senate of the Republic	Campania	PdL	–	Elected
2014	European Parliament	Central Italy	FI	81,955	Elected
2019	European Parliament	Central Italy	FI	17,789	Not elected
2024	European Parliament	Central Italy	FI	8,007	Not elected
