= White Sister (film) =

- Directed by: Alberto Lattuada
- Written by: Tonino Guerra; Ruggero Maccari; Iaia Fiastri; Alberto Lattuada
- Starring: Sophia Loren; Adriano Celentano
- Cinematography: Alfio Contini
- Edited by: Sergio Montanari
- Music by: Fred Bongusto
- Distributed by: Columbia Pictures
- Release dates: 23 March 1972 (Lodi-premiere); 31 March 1972 (Italy); 11 September 1972 (Barcelona); 23 August 1974 (France); 31 March 1973 (NYC); August 1973 (USA)
- Running time: 96 minutes
- Countries: Italy; France; Spain
- Language: Italian

White Sister (Italian: Bianco, rosso e..., lit. 'White, red and...', also known as The Sin) is a 1972 Italian comedy film directed by Alberto Lattuada. The film was a commercial success.

== Cast ==
- Sophia Loren as Sister Germana
- Adriano Celentano as Annibale Pezzi
- Fernando Rey as Il primario
- Juan Luis Galiardo as Guido
- Giuseppe Maffioli as Dr. Arrighi
- Luis Marín as Brigadiere libico
- Sergio Fasanelli as Dr. Filippini
- Teresa Rabal as Lisa
- Pilar Gómez Ferrer as Hermana Teresa
- Tina Aumont as Ricci
- Enzo Cannavale as Quinto
- Bruno Scipioni as Chiacchiera
- Dori Dorika as Dorotea
- Alessandra Mussolini as Sister Germana as a child
