= Social Action =

Social Action Azione Sociale
- Leader: Alessandra Mussolini
- Founded: 2003
- Dissolved: 2009
- Split from: National Alliance
- Merged into: The People of Freedom
- Headquarters: Viale Regina Margherita, 239 – 00198 Rome
- Newspaper: None
- Ideology: Neo-fascism
- Political position: Far-right
- National affiliation: Social Alternative (2004–2006)

Social Action (Italian: Azione Sociale, AS), previously known as Freedom of Action (Libertà di Azione, LdA), was a neo-fascist political party in Italy, founded and led by politician Alessandra Mussolini, who is the granddaughter of Benito Mussolini. The party became a faction within Silvio Berlusconi's People of Freedom party.

== History ==
Mussolini, who had been a member of the National Alliance (AN) since its foundation, suddenly left that party on 28 November 2003, following the visit of party leader and the Deputy Prime Minister Gianfranco Fini to Israel, where he described fascism as "the absolute evil" as he apologised for Italy's role as an Axis Power during the Second World War. Mussolini however defended the right of Israel to exist and declared that the world "should beg forgiveness of Israel".

Mussolini then formed her party and organized a far-right coalition named Social Alternative. That was a surprising move, as Mussolini, during her political career, had always taken social progressive stances on many issues, including abortion, artificial insemination, gay rights and civil unions. She has been an outspoken "feminist", and has been described by conservative commentators as a "socialist" and a "left-winger".

The Social Alternative coalition was disbanded after the 2006 general election and by 2007 the party was almost disbanded as most of its original members returned to the National Alliance. Mussolini herself re-approached with Fini and was preparing her re-entry in AN when Silvio Berlusconi launched The People of Freedom (PdL). Mussolini decided to merge what remained of Social Action into the new party and was elected in the 2008 general election as part of the PdL. In October 2012, the balance of accounts of the People of Freedom showed that Social Action had received €100,000 of financial support from the PdL.

Within the PdL Mussolini soon became the leader of the "pro-immigrant" wing of the party, often opposing some of the policies of the Berlusconi government or taking an independent line from it.
