= Sophia Loren =

Italian actress (born 1934)

Sophia Loren OMRI L.d'H.
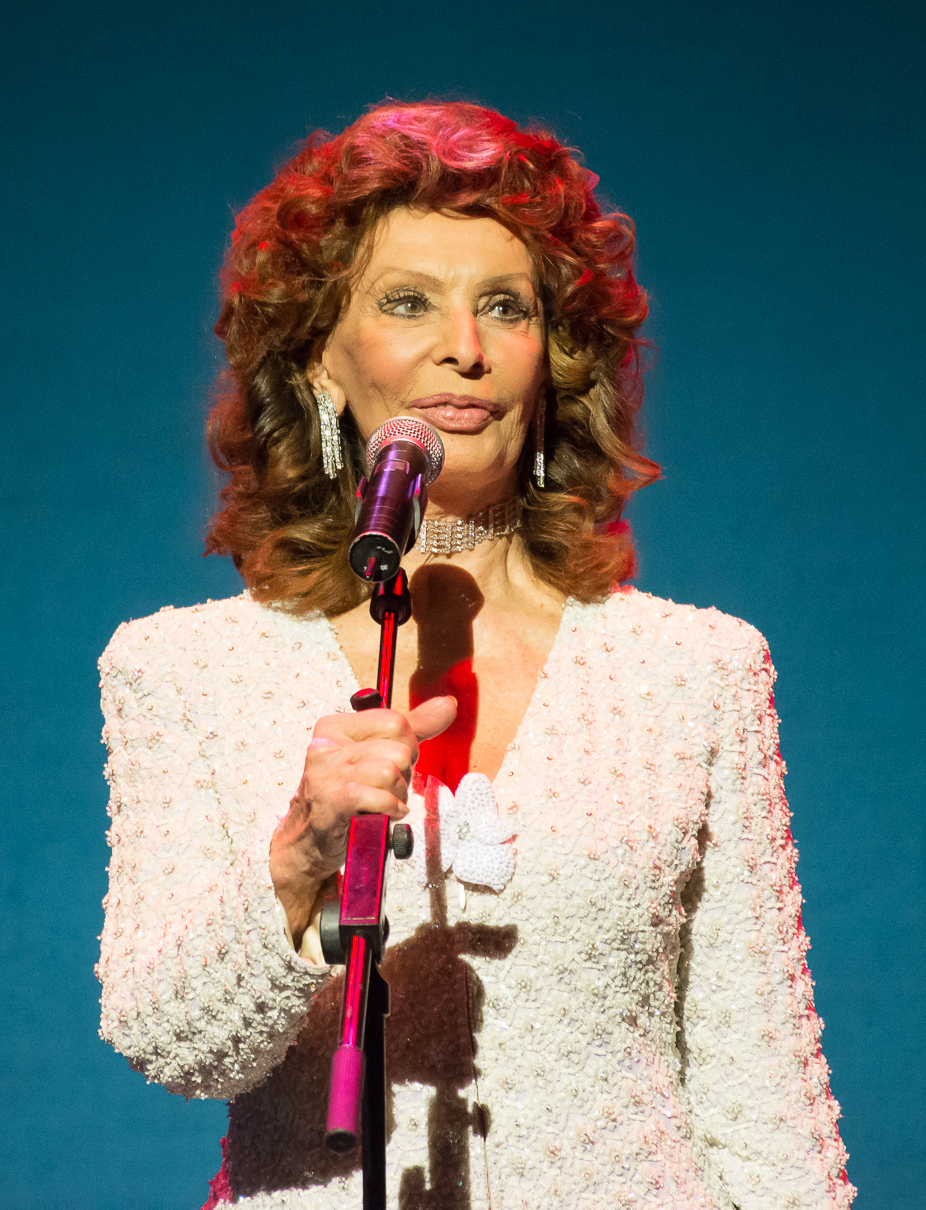
- Loren at the Transilvania International Film Festival 2016
- Born: Sofia Costanza Brigida Villani Scicolone; 20 September 1934 (age 92); Rome, Kingdom of Italy
- Other name: Sofia Lazzaro
- Citizenship: Italy; France
- Occupation: Actress
- Years active: 1950–2020
- Spouses: Carlo Ponti (m. 1957; ann. 1962) (m. 1966; died 2007)
- Children: Carlo Ponti Jr. Edoardo Ponti
- Relatives: Maria Scicolone (sister); Romano Mussolini (brother-in-law); Alessandra Mussolini (niece); Romano Floriani Mussolini (grandnephew); Sasha Alexander (daughter-in-law)

Signature
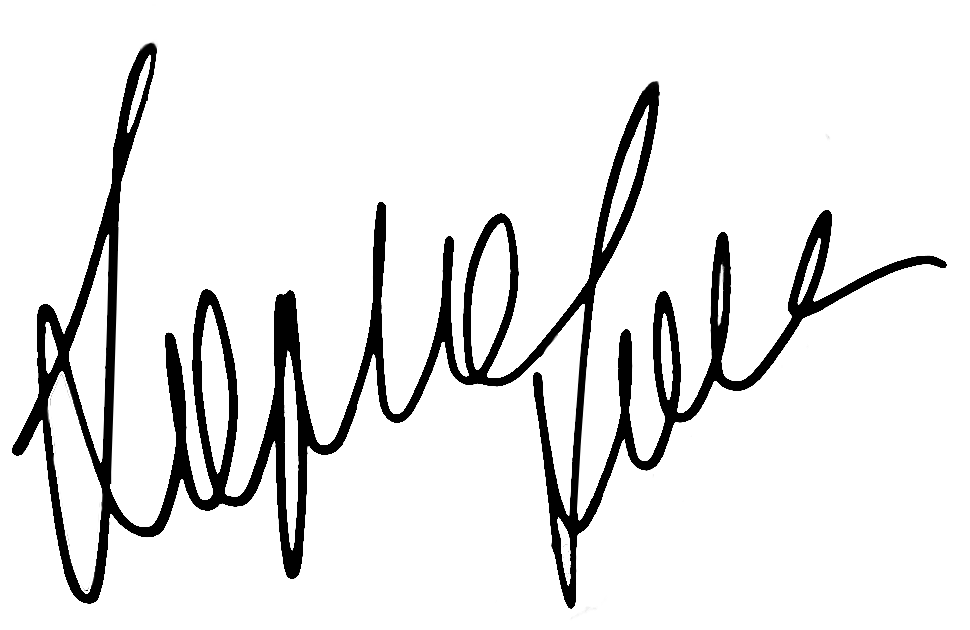

Sofia Costanza Brigida Villani Scicolone (Note: Italian pronunciation: [soˈfiːa koˈstantsa ˈbriːdʒida vilˈlaːni ʃʃikoˈloːne].) (born 20 September 1934), known professionally as Sophia Loren, (Note: English: /ləˈrɛn/ lə-REN, Italian: [ˈlɔːren].) is an Italian actress. Over a career spanning more than seven decades, she has received an Academy Award, seven David di Donatello Awards, five special Golden Globe Awards, a Cecil B. DeMille Award, a BAFTA Award, a Laurel Award, a Grammy Award, a Volpi Cup, a Cannes Film Festival Award, and an Academy Honorary Award. Loren was also named one of the greatest legends of American cinema by the American Film Institute and appointed a Knight of the Legion of Honour in 1991 and a Knight Grand Cross of the Order of Merit of the Italian Republic in 1996. At the age of 92 as of 2026, she is one of the last surviving major stars from the Golden Age of Hollywood, and remains active in both Italy and the United States.

Encouraged to enroll in acting lessons after entering a beauty pageant, Loren began her film career at age 16 in 1950. She appeared in several bit parts and minor roles in the early part of the decade, until her five-picture contract with Paramount in 1956 launched her international career. Her film appearances around this time include The Pride and the Passion, Houseboat, and It Started in Naples. During the 1950s, she starred in films as a sexually emancipated persona and was one of the best known sex symbols of the time.

Loren's performance as Cesira in the film Two Women (1960), directed by Vittorio De Sica, won her the Academy Award for Best Actress, making her the first performer to ever win an Oscar for a non-English-language performance. She holds the record for having earned seven David di Donatello Awards for Best Actress: Two Women; Yesterday, Today and Tomorrow (1963); Marriage Italian Style (1964, for which she was nominated for a second Oscar); Sunflower (1970); The Voyage (1974); A Special Day (1977) and The Life Ahead (2020).

At the start of the 1980s, Loren chose to make rarer film appearances. Since then, she has appeared in films such as Prêt-à-porter (1994), Grumpier Old Men (1995), Nine (2009), and The Life Ahead (2020).

== Early life ==
=== Family and childhood ===
Sofia Costanza Brigida Villani Scicolone was born on September 20, 1934, in the Clinica Regina Margherita in Rome, the daughter of Romilda Villani (1910–1991) and Riccardo Scicolone Murillo (1907–1976). Her mother was a piano teacher and aspiring actress, and her father a failed engineer who worked temporarily for the national railway Ferrovie dello Stato Italiane. Loren claimed in her autobiography that he was of noble descent, by virtue of which she is entitled to call herself "Viscountess of Pozzuoli, Lady of Caserta, a title given by the House of Hohenstaufen, Marchioness of Licata Scicolone Murillo".

Loren's father refused to marry her mother, leaving her without financial support. Loren met her father three times, at age five, age seventeen and in 1976 at his deathbed, stating that she forgave him but had never forgotten his abandonment of her mother. Loren's parents had another child together, her sister Maria, in 1938. Scicolone did not want to formally recognise Maria as his daughter. When Loren became successful, she paid her father in order to have her sister Maria take the Scicolone last name. Loren has two younger paternal half-brothers, Giuliano and Giuseppe. Romilda, Sofia, and Maria lived with Loren's grandmother in Pozzuoli, near Naples.

During the Second World War, the harbour and munitions plant in Pozzuoli was a frequent bombing target of the Allies. During one raid, as Loren ran to the shelter, she was struck by shrapnel and wounded in the chin. After that, the family moved to Naples, where they were taken in by distant relatives. After the war, Loren and her family returned to Pozzuoli. Loren's grandmother Luisa opened a pub in their living room, selling homemade cherry liquor. Romilda played the piano, Maria sang, and Loren waited on tables and washed dishes. The place was popular with the American GIs stationed nearby.

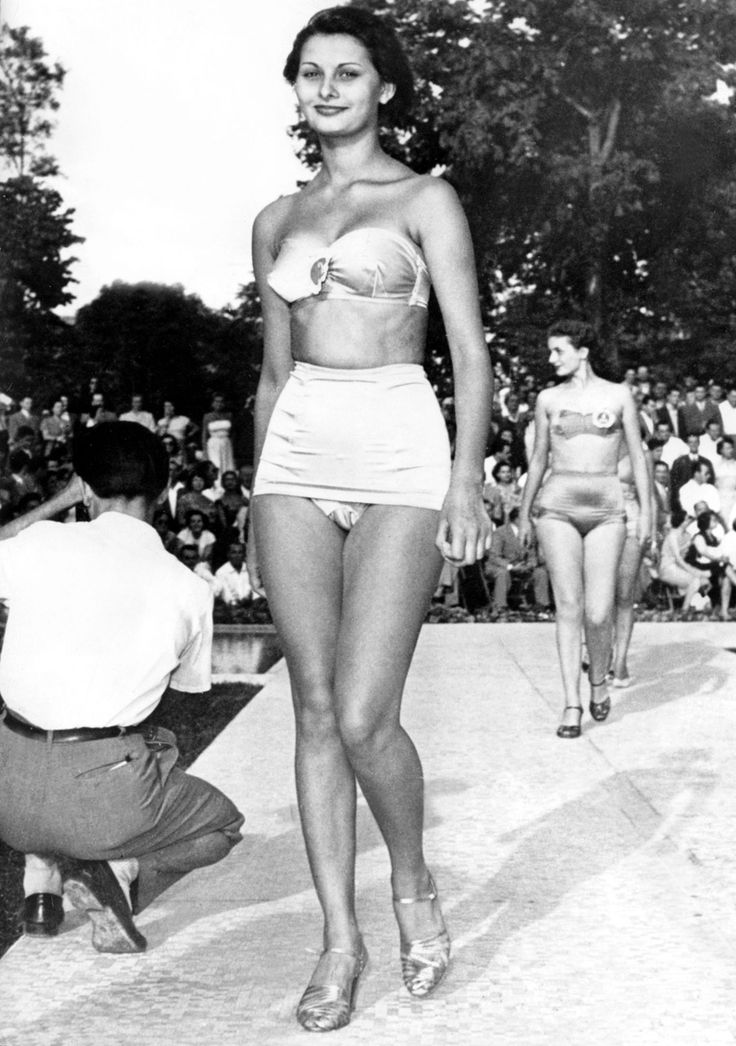
Loren, age 15, as Sofia Lazzaro during a beauty pageant

=== Pageantry ===
Sofia participated in her first beauty pageant at the age of 15. "The Queen of the Sea" contest, organized by the newspaper Corriere di Napoli was held in Naples, on 2 October 1949. She had travelled with her mother via train from Pozzuoli while wearing her pageant dress made by her grandmother out of taffeta curtains. She was one of 12 girls to win a consolation prize as "princesses". The princesses along with the queen were paraded through the city streets in a carriage. The winnings included 23,000 lire and a train ticket to Rome. Later, the train ticket would facilitate her and her mother's move to Rome in search of work at Cinecittà.

Also at age 15, Loren (as Sofia Lazzaro) entered the Miss Italia 1950 beauty pageant and was assigned as Candidate No. 2, being one of the four contestants representing the Lazio region. She was selected as one of the last three finalists and won the title of Miss Elegance 1950, while Liliana Cardinale won the title of Miss Cinema and Anna Maria Bugliari won the grand title of Miss Italia. She returned in 2001 as president of the jury for the 61st edition of the pageant. In 2010, Loren crowned the 71st Miss Italia pageant winner.

== Career ==
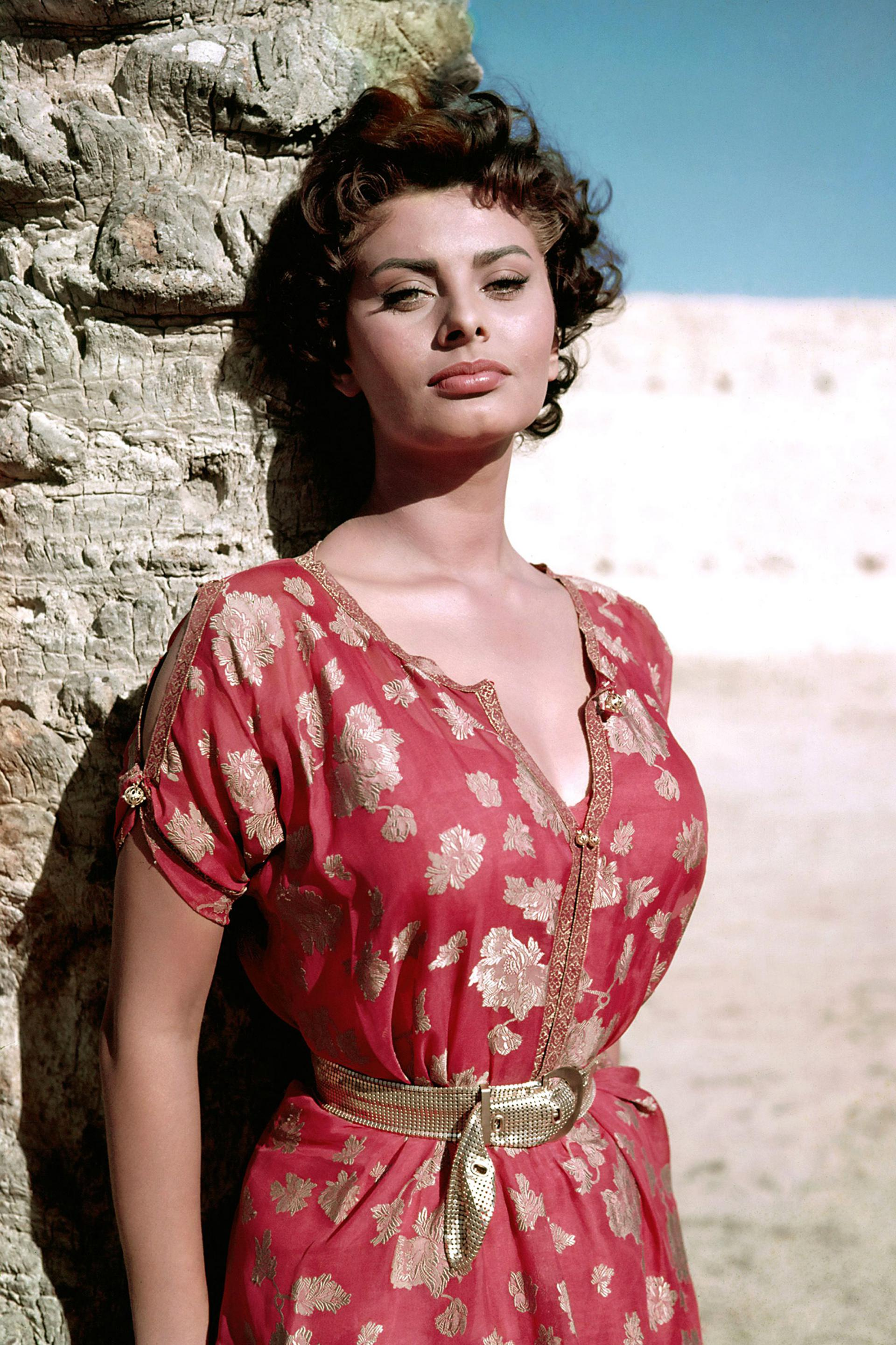
Loren in a publicity photo for Legend of the Lost (1957)

=== Early roles ===
Sofia was placed in a Neapolitan acting school by her mother who earned the money by teaching piano lessons. It was through the school's instructor, Pino Serpe, that Sophia obtained her first film roles. These were small, uncredited parts in films such as Hearts at Sea (1950) and The Vow (1950). Sophia and her mother relocated to Rome after learning that MGM was filming the epic film Quo Vadis there and were looking for extras.

Sofia Lazzaro enrolled in the Centro Sperimentale di Cinematografia, the national film school of Italy and appeared as an uncredited extra in Mervyn LeRoy's 1951 film Quo Vadis, when she was 16 years old. She was noticed by Michał Waszyński, who promoted her and helped her get her first significant role. That same year, Loren appeared in the Italian film Era lui... sì! sì!, in which she played an odalisque, and was credited as Sofia Lazzaro. In the early part of the decade, she played bit parts and had minor roles in several films, including La Favorita (1952).

Carlo Ponti changed her name and public image to appeal to a wider audience as Sophia Loren, being a twist on the name of the Swedish actress Märta Torén and suggested by Goffredo Lombardo. Her first starring role was in Aida (1953), for which she received critical acclaim.

After playing the lead role in Two Nights with Cleopatra (1953), her breakthrough role was in The Gold of Naples (1954), directed by Vittorio De Sica. Too Bad She's Bad, also released in 1954, and La Bella Mugnaia (1955) became the first of many films in which Loren co-starred with Marcello Mastroianni. Over the next three years, she acted in many films, including Scandal in Sorrento, Lucky to Be a Woman, Boy on a Dolphin, Legend of the Lost and The Pride and the Passion (1957), the latter film a Napoleonic era war-epic set in Spain starring Cary Grant and Frank Sinatra.

=== International stardom ===
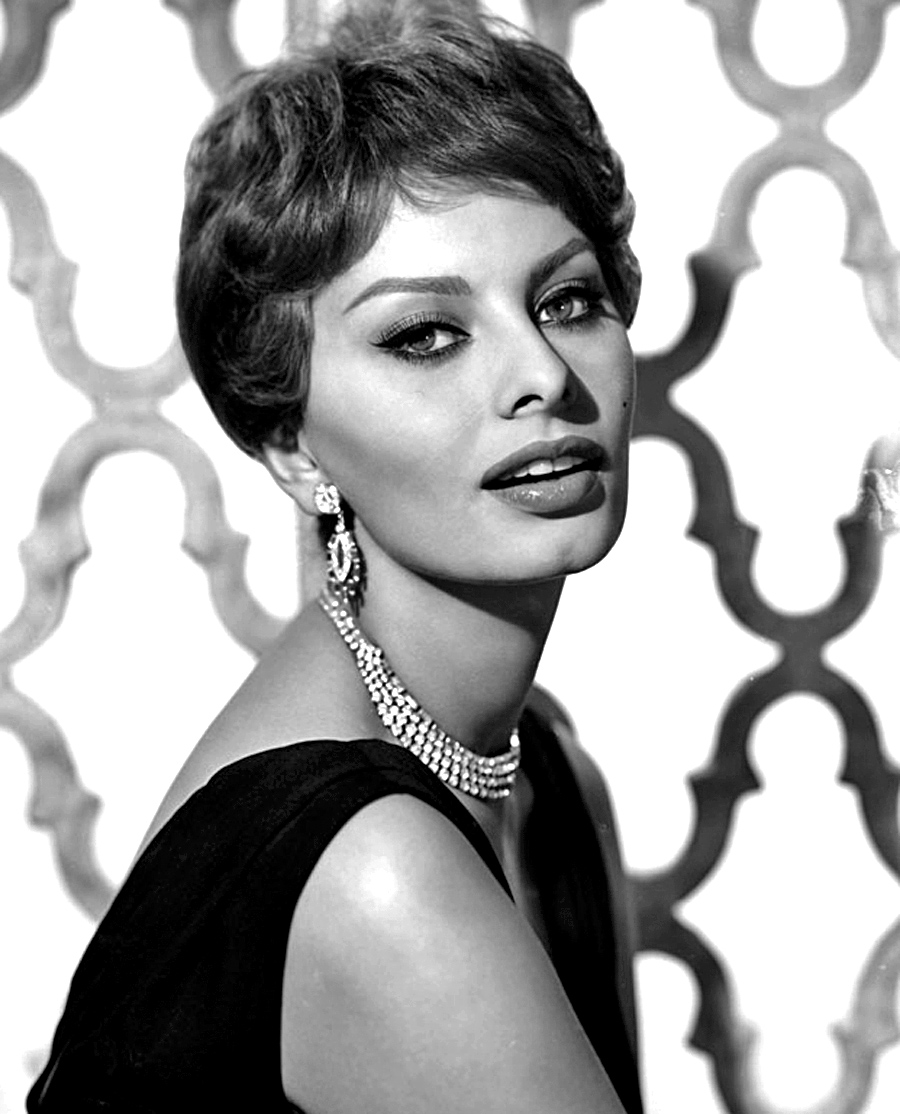
Loren in 1959

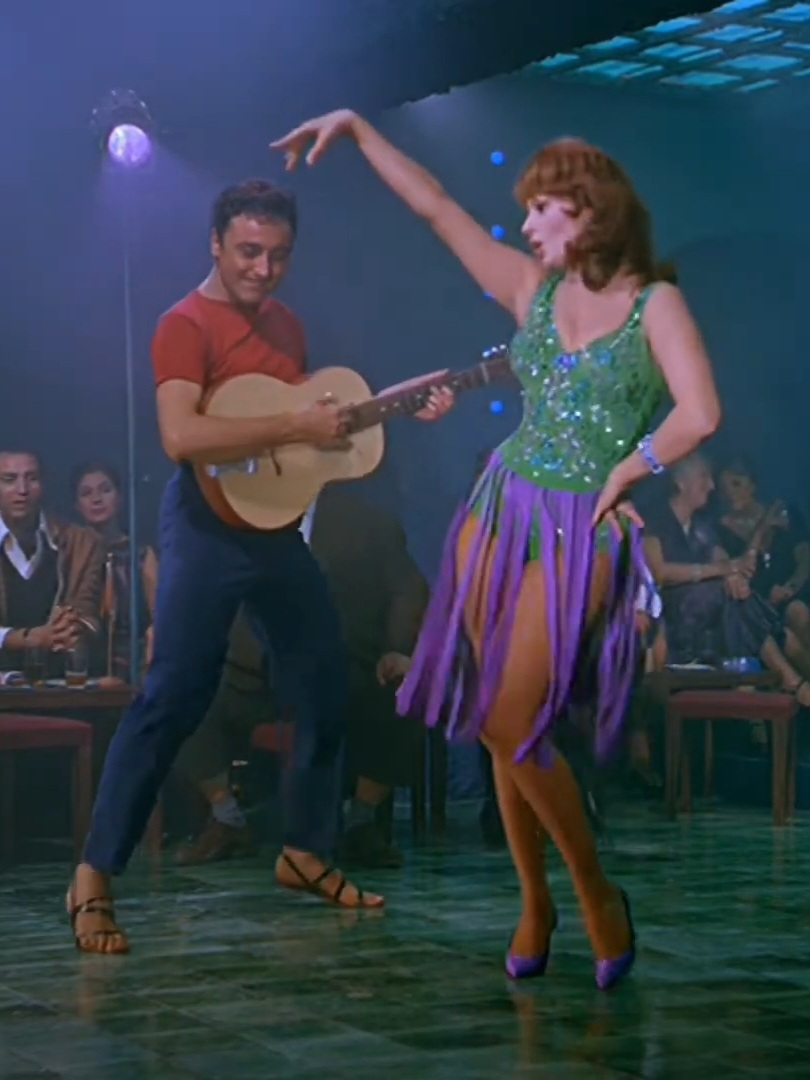
Loren in It Started in Naples (1960), in which she famously sang "Tu vuò fà l'americano"

Loren became an international film star following her five-picture contract with Paramount Pictures in 1958. Among her films at this time were Desire Under the Elms with Anthony Perkins, based upon the Eugene O'Neill play; Houseboat, a romantic comedy co-starring Cary Grant; and George Cukor's Heller in Pink Tights, in which she appeared as a blonde for the first time.

In 1960, Loren starred in Vittorio De Sica's Two Women, a stark, gritty story of a mother who is trying to protect her 12-year-old daughter in war-torn Italy. The two end up gang-raped inside a church as they travel back to their home city following cessation of bombings there. Originally cast as the daughter, Loren fought against type and was eventually cast as the mother (actress Eleonora Brown would portray the daughter).

Loren's performance earned her many awards, including the Cannes Film Festival's best performance prize, and an Academy Award for Best Actress, the first major Academy Award for a non-English-language performance or to an Italian actress. She won 22 international awards for Two Women. The film was extremely well received by critics and a huge commercial success. Though proud of this accomplishment, Loren did not show up to this award, citing fear of fainting at the award ceremony. Nevertheless, Cary Grant telephoned her in Rome the next day to inform her of the Oscar award.

During the 1960s, Loren was one of the most popular actresses in the world, and continued to make films in the United States and Europe, starring with prominent leading men. In 1961 and 1964, her career reached its pinnacle when she received $1 million to appear in El Cid and The Fall of the Roman Empire. In 1965, she received a second Academy Award nomination for her performance in Marriage Italian-Style opposite Marcello Mastroianni.

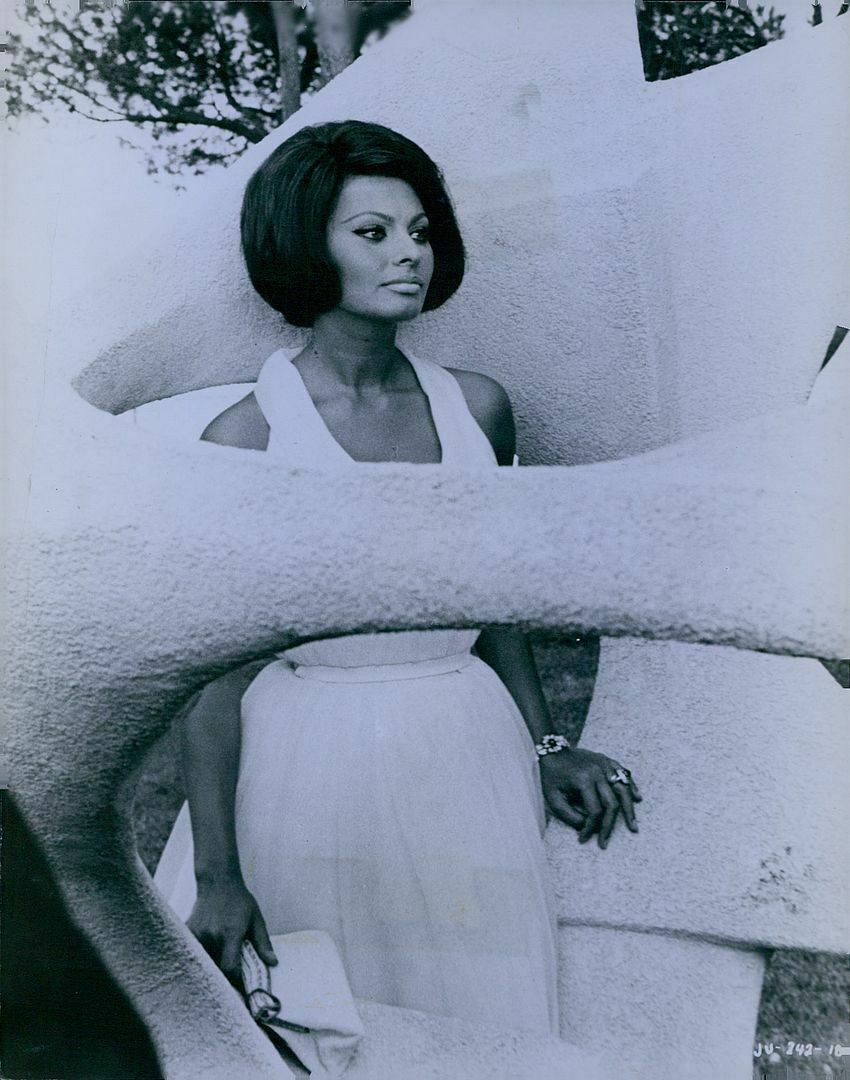
Loren in Judith (1966)

Among Loren's best-known films of this period are Samuel Bronston's epic production of El Cid with Charlton Heston, The Millionairess (1960) with Peter Sellers, It Started in Naples (1960) with Clark Gable, Vittorio De Sica's triptych Yesterday, Today and Tomorrow (1963) with Marcello Mastroianni, Peter Ustinov's Lady L (1965) with Paul Newman, Arabesque (1966) with Gregory Peck, and Charlie Chaplin's final film, A Countess from Hong Kong (1967) with Marlon Brando.

Loren received four Golden Globe Awards between 1964 and 1977 as "World Film Favorite – Female".

=== Continued success ===
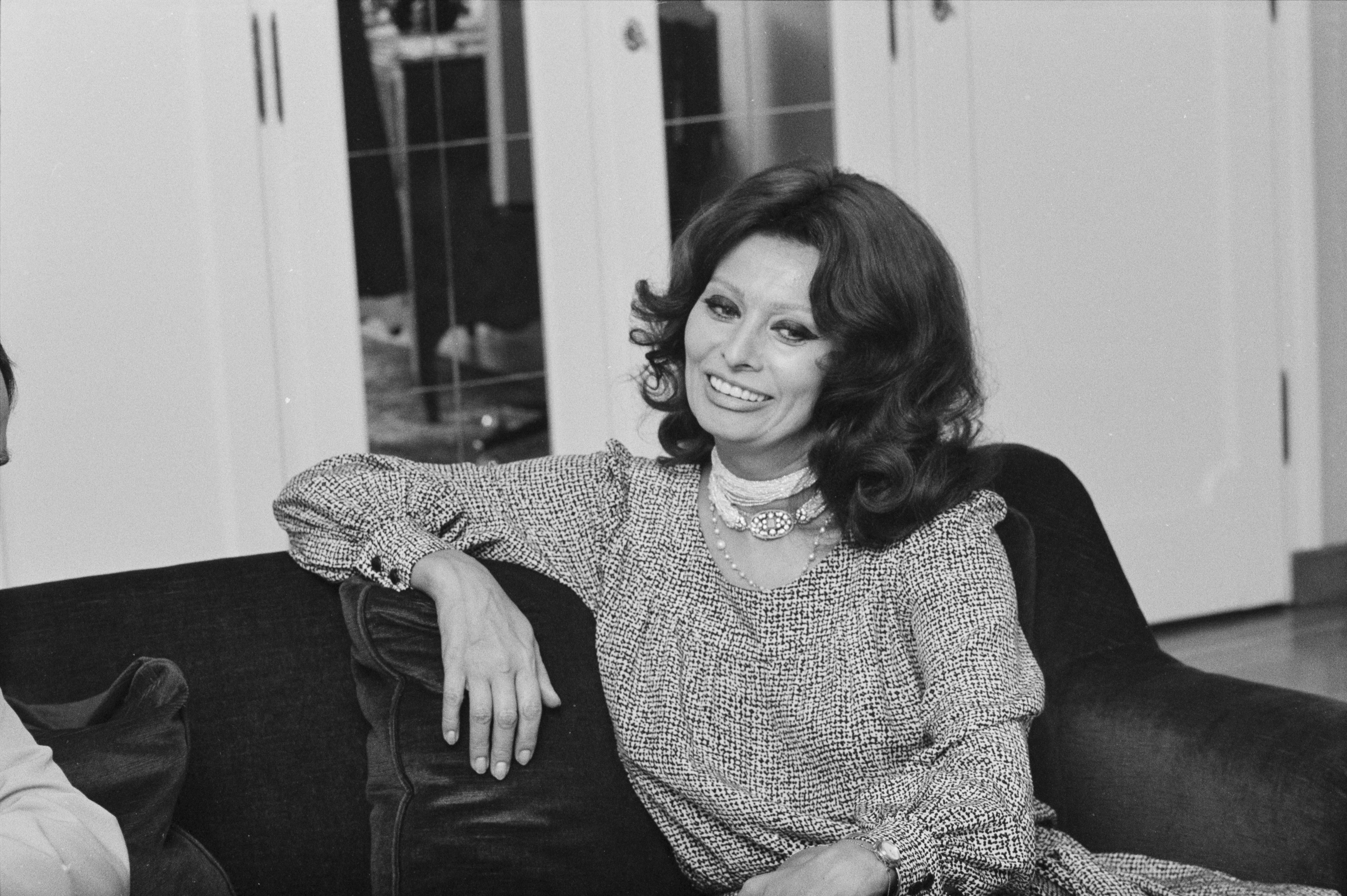
Loren in 1979

Loren appeared in fewer movies after becoming a mother in 1968. During the next decade, most of her roles were in Italian features. During the 1970s, she was paired with Richard Burton in the last De Sica-directed film, The Voyage (1974), and a remake of the film Brief Encounter (1974). The film had its premiere on US television on 12 November 1974 as part of the Hallmark Hall of Fame series on NBC. In 1976, she starred in The Cassandra Crossing. It fared extremely well internationally, and was a respectable box office success in the US market. She co-starred with Marcello Mastroianni again in Ettore Scola's A Special Day (1977). This movie was nominated for 11 international awards such as two Oscars (best actor in leading role, best foreign picture). It won a Golden Globe Award and a César Award for best foreign movie. Loren's performance was awarded with a David di Donatello Award, the seventh in her career. The movie was extremely well received by American reviewers. Following this success, Loren starred in an American thriller Brass Target. This movie received mixed reviews, although it was moderately successful in the United States and internationally. In 1978, she won her fourth Golden Globe for "world film favorite". Other movies of this decade were Academy Award nominee Sunflower (1970), which was a critical success, and Arthur Hiller's Man of La Mancha (1972), which was a critical and commercial failure despite being nominated for several awards, including two Golden Globes. Peter O'Toole and James Coco were nominated for two NBR awards, in addition the NBR listed Man of La Mancha in its best ten pictures of 1972 list. Loren headlined the action thriller Firepower (1979) co-starring James Coburn and O. J. Simpson, whom she had previously worked with on The Cassandra Crossing.

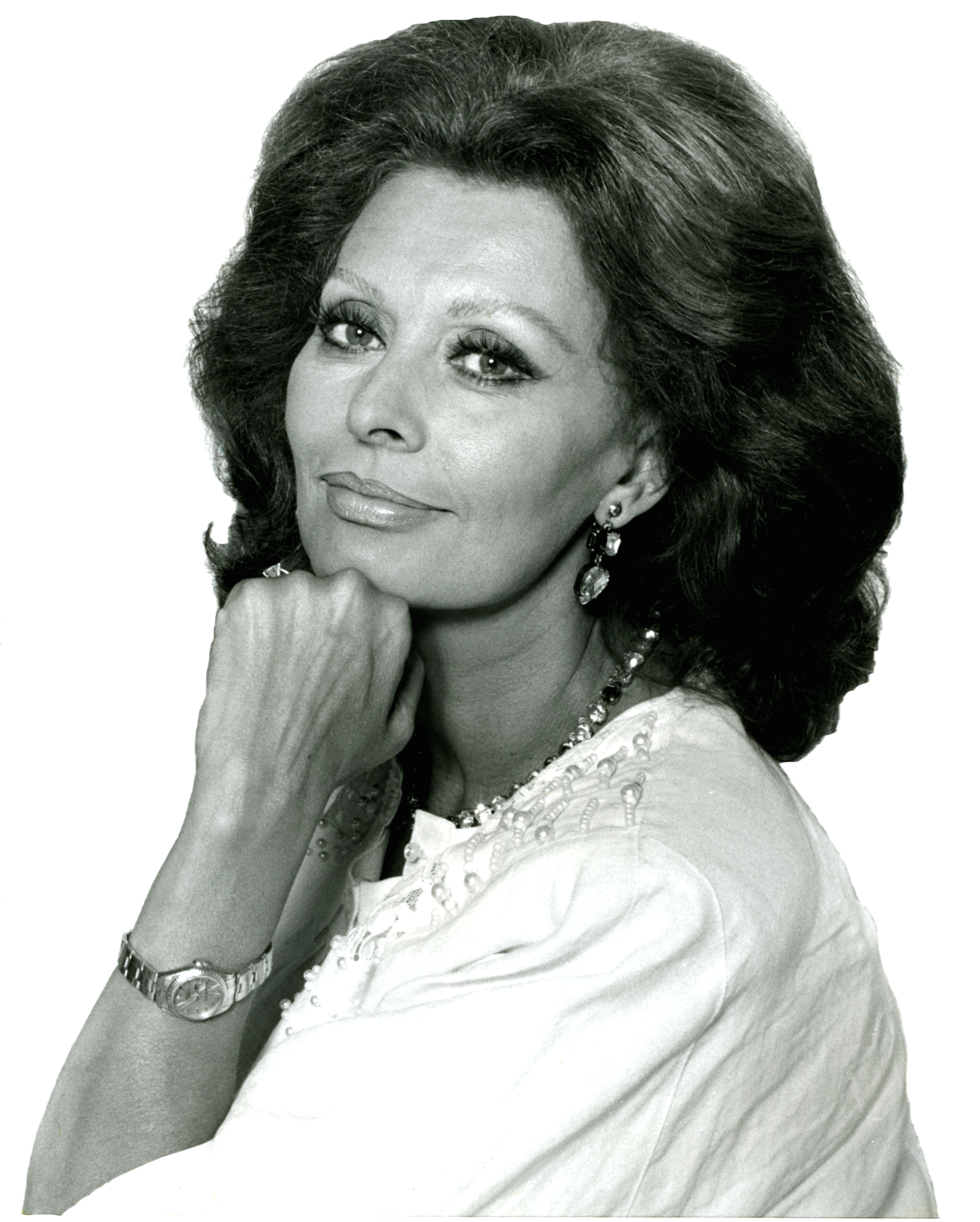
Loren in 1986, photo by Allan Warren

In 1980, after the international success of the biography Sophia Loren: Living and Loving, Her Own Story by A. E. Hotchner, Loren portrayed herself and her mother in a made-for-television biographical film adaptation of her autobiography, Sophia Loren: Her Own Story. Ritza Brown and Chiara Ferrari each portrayed the younger Loren. In 1981, she became the first female celebrity to launch her own perfume, 'Sophia', and a brand of eyewear soon followed.

Loren acted infrequently during the 1980s, preferring to devote more time to raising her sons. In 1981 she turned down the role of Alexis Carrington in the television series Dynasty. Although she was set to star in 13 episodes of CBS's Falcon Crest in 1984 as Angela Channing's half-sister Francesca Gioberti, negotiations fell through at the last moment and the role went to Gina Lollobrigida instead. She played the title role in the 1984 TV movie Aurora, in which she acted alongside her 11-year-old real-life son Edoardo Ponti.

Loren has recorded more than two dozen songs throughout her career, including a best-selling album of comedic songs with Peter Sellers; reportedly, she had to fend off his romantic advances. Partly owing to Sellers's infatuation with Loren, he split with his first wife, Anne Howe. Loren has made it clear to numerous biographers that Sellers's affections were reciprocated only platonically. This collaboration was covered in The Life and Death of Peter Sellers where actress Sonia Aquino portrayed Loren. The song "Where Do You Go To (My Lovely)?" by Peter Sarstedt was said to have been inspired by Loren.

=== Later career ===
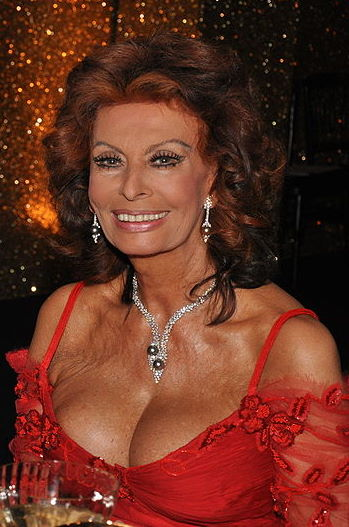
Loren in 2009

In 1991, Loren received an Academy Honorary Award, which described her as "One of the genuine treasures of world cinema who, in a career rich with memorable performances, has added permanent luster to our art form." In 1995, she received the Golden Globe Cecil B. DeMille Award, a similar honorary award, bestowed by the Hollywood Foreign Press Association, for outstanding contributions to the world of entertainment.

Loren presented Federico Fellini with his honorary Oscar in April 1993. In 2009, Loren stated on Larry King Live that Fellini had planned to direct her in a film shortly before his death in 1993. Throughout the 1990s and 2000s, Loren was selective about choosing her films and ventured into various areas of business, including cookbooks, eyewear, jewelry, and perfume. She received a Golden Globe nomination for her performance in Robert Altman's film Ready to Wear (1994), co-starring Julia Roberts.

In 1994, a Golden Palm Star on the Palm Springs, California, Walk of Stars was dedicated to her.

In Grumpier Old Men (1995), Loren played a femme fatale opposite Walter Matthau, Jack Lemmon, and Ann-Margret. The film was a box-office success and became Loren's biggest US hit in years. At the 20th Moscow International Film Festival in 1997, she was awarded an Honorable Prize for contribution to cinema. In 1999, the American Film Institute named Loren among the greatest female stars of American film history. In 2001, Loren received a Special Grand Prix of the Americas Award at the Montreal World Film Festival for her body of work. She filmed two projects in Canada during this time: the independent film Between Strangers (2002), directed by her son Edoardo and co-starring Mira Sorvino, and the television miniseries Lives of the Saints (2004).

In 2009, after five years off the set and 14 years since she starred in a prominent US theatrical film, Loren starred in Rob Marshall's film version of Nine, based on the Broadway musical that tells the story of a director whose midlife crisis causes him to struggle to complete his latest film; he is forced to balance the influences of numerous formative women in his life, including his deceased mother. Loren was Marshall's first and only choice for the role. The film also stars Daniel Day-Lewis, Penélope Cruz, Kate Hudson, Marion Cotillard, and Nicole Kidman. As a part of the cast, she received her first nomination for a Screen Actors Guild Award.

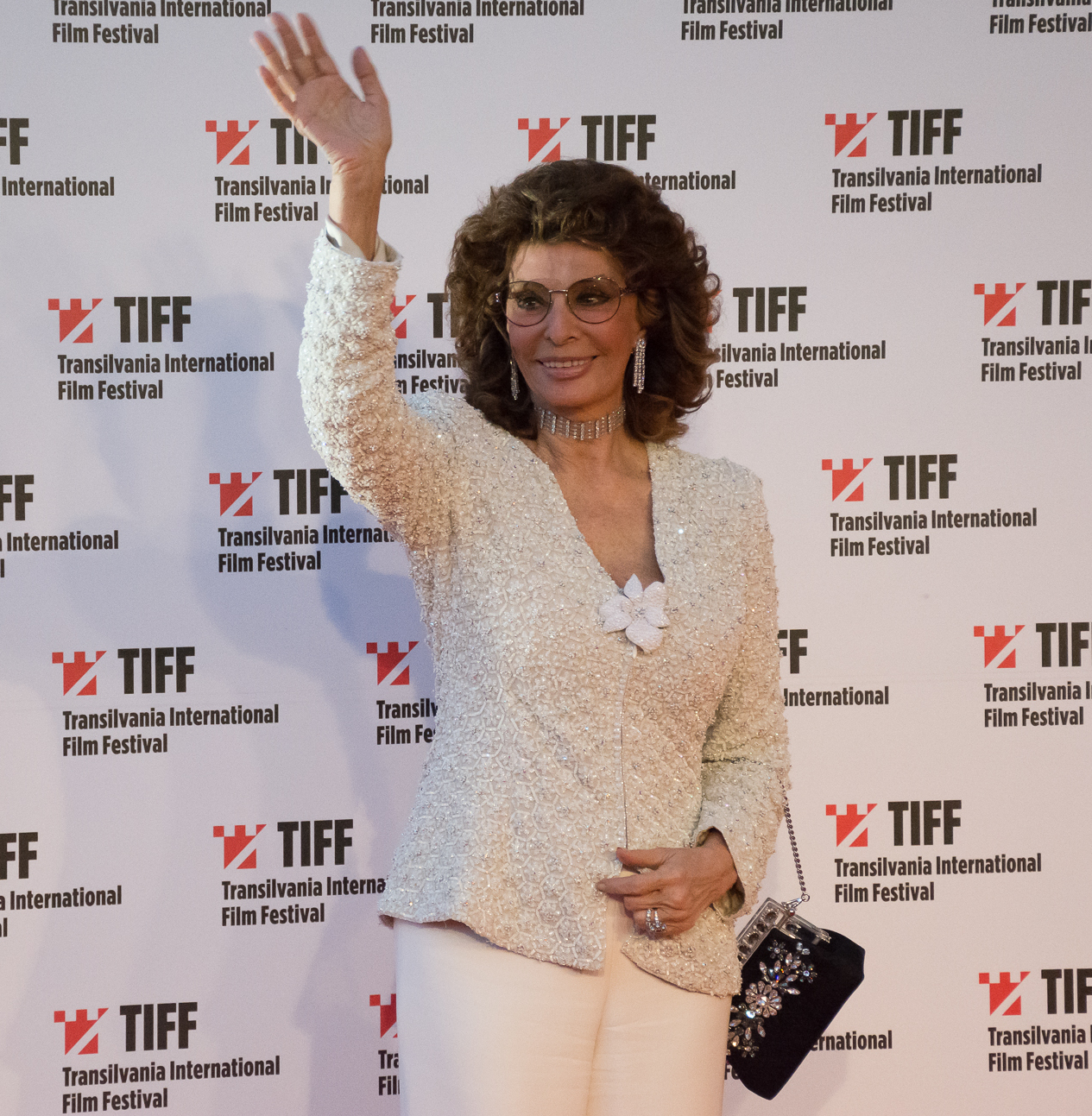
Loren in 2016

In 2010, Loren played her own mother in a two-part Italian television miniseries about her early life, directed by Vittorio Sindoni with Margareth Madè as Loren, entitled La mia casa è piena di specchi (My House Is Full of Mirrors), based on the memoir by her sister Maria. In July 2013 Loren made her film comeback in an Italian short-film adaptation of Jean Cocteau's 1930 play The Human Voice (La voce umana), which charts the breakdown of a woman who is left by her lover – with her younger son, Edoardo Ponti, as director. Filming took under a month during July in various locations in Italy, including Rome and Naples. It was Loren's first theatrical film since Nine. She returned to feature-length film, as Holocaust survivor Madame Rosa, in Ponti's 2020 feature film The Life Ahead. In 2021 she received AARP Best Actress and AWFJ Grand Dame awards for her role. After turning 90 in September 2024, despite having been inactive since the release of The Life Ahead, Loren dismissed rumors about her retirement and expressed her hopes to star in new productions.

On 16 November 2017, Loren received a star at Almeria Walk of Fame in Spain for her work on White Sister. She received the Almería Tierra de Cine award.

== Personal life ==
Loren is a Roman Catholic. Since 2006, her primary residence has been in Geneva, Switzerland. Loren's real estate portfolio has included a ranch in Hidden Valley, California, an apartment in the Hampshire House building in Manhattan, a condo on Williams Island in South Florida, and a villa in Rome.

Loren is an ardent fan of the football club S.S.C. Napoli. In May 2007, when the team was third in Serie B, she (then aged 72) told the Gazzetta dello Sport that she would do a striptease if the team won. She had recently posed for the 2007 Pirelli Calendar.

In February 2021, Loren was the guest on BBC Radio 4's Desert Island Discs and chose a pizza oven as her luxury item. Her musical choices included Cole Porter's "I've Got You Under My Skin" as sung by Ella Fitzgerald, and Debussy's "Clair de lune" as played by Tamás Vásáry. She revealed that fellow actor Richard Burton was furious with her for cheating at Scrabble.

On 24 September 2023, Loren received emergency surgery following fractures to her hip and femur sustained from a fall at her home in Switzerland.

=== Marriage and family ===
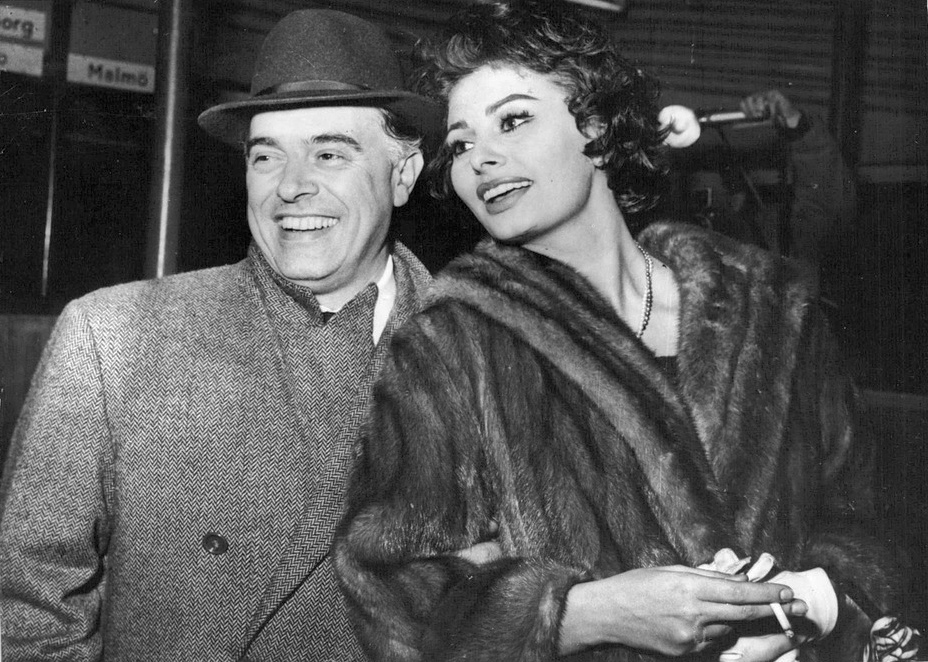
Carlo Ponti and Loren in 1958

Loren first met Carlo Ponti in 1950, when she was 15 and he was 37, and they soon began an affair. Since divorce was not permitted in Italian law at the time, Ponti was not legally divorced from his wife, Giuliana Fiastri, when Loren married him by proxy (two male lawyers stood in for them) in Mexico on 17 September 1957. The couple had their marriage annulled in 1962 to escape bigamy charges, but continued to live together. In 1965, they became French citizens after their application was approved by then French Prime Minister Georges Pompidou. Ponti then obtained a divorce from Giuliana in France, allowing him to marry Loren on 9 April 1966. The marriage lasted until Ponti's death on 10 January 2007 from pulmonary complications, aged 94.

The couple had two sons, Carlo Ponti Jr., born on 29 December 1968, and Edoardo Ponti, born on 6 January 1973. Loren's daughters-in-law are Sasha Alexander and Andrea Meszaros. Loren has four grandchildren and is one of Drew Barrymore's godparents, along with Anna Strasberg and Steven Spielberg.

In 1962, Loren's sister Maria married the youngest son of Benito Mussolini, Romano, with whom she had two daughters, Alessandra, a former MP and MEP, and Elisabetta.

=== Affair with Cary Grant ===
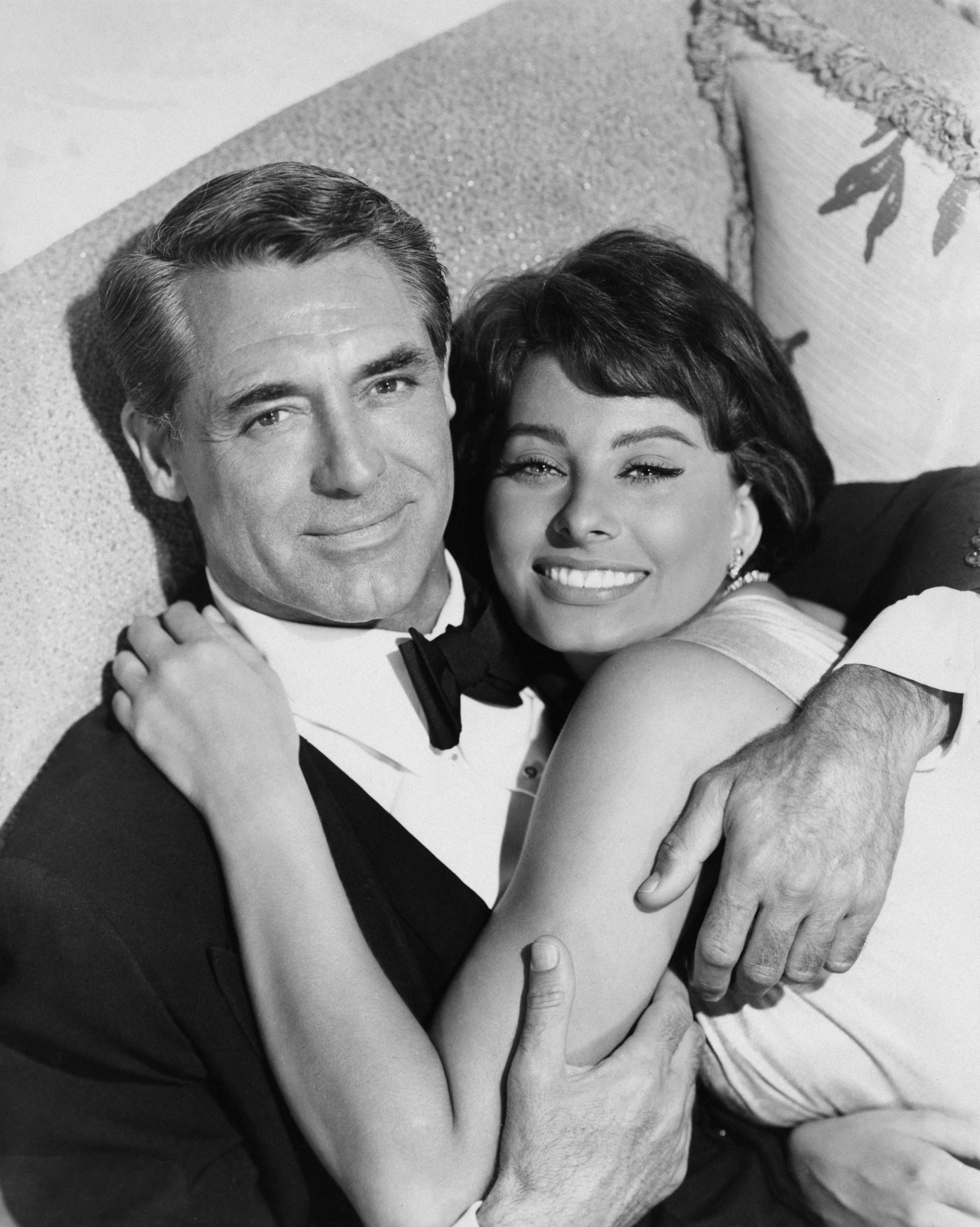
Cary Grant and Loren in Houseboat (1958)

Loren and Cary Grant co-starred in Houseboat (1958). Grant's wife Betsy Drake wrote the original script, and Grant originally intended that Drake would star with him. After he began an affair with Loren while filming The Pride and the Passion (1957), Grant arranged for Loren to take Drake's place with a rewritten script for which Drake asked not to receive credit. The affair ended in bitterness before The Pride and the Passion's filming ended, causing problems on the Houseboat set. Grant hoped to resume the relationship, but Loren decided to marry Carlo Ponti instead.

=== Legal issues and lawsuits ===
In 1982, while in Italy, Loren made headlines after serving 17 days in prison on tax evasion charges. Loren said her accountant had made a mistake on her tax return. The matter did not hamper her popularity or career. In 2013, the Supreme Court of Italy cleared her of the charges in a separate decades-long dispute over the tax she should have paid on her 1974 earnings.

In September 1999, Loren filed a lawsuit against 79 adult websites for posting altered nude photos of her on the internet.

== Filmography ==
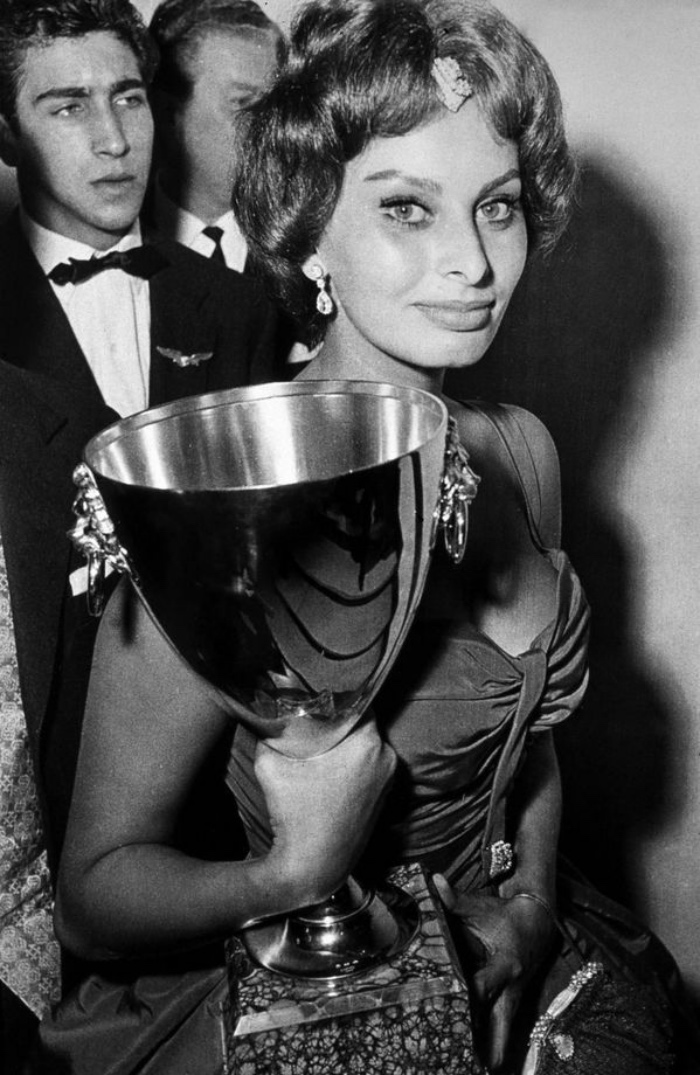
Loren with her Volpi Cup in 1958

Year	Title	Role	Notes
1950	Bluebeard's Six Wives	Girl kidnapped	
1950	Tototarzan	A tarzanide	
1950	The Vow	A commoner at the Piedigrotta festival	
1950	Hearts at Sea	Extra	Uncredited
1951	I'm the Capataz	Secretary of the Dictator	
1951	Brief Rapture	A girl in the boardinghouse	
1951	The Steamship Owner	Ballerinetta	
1951	Milan Billionaire	Extra	Uncredited
1951	The Reluctant Magician	The bride	
1951	Quo Vadis	Lygia's slave	Uncredited
1951	Era lui... sì! sì! (It Was He!... Yes! Yes!)	Odalisque	As Sofia Lazzaro
1951	Anna	Night club assistant	Uncredited
1952	And Arrived the Accordatore	Giulietta's friend	
1952	I Dream of Zorro	Conchita	As Sofia Scicolone
1952	La Favorita	Leonora	
1953	The Country of the Campanelli	Bonbon	
1953	We Find Ourselves in the Gallery	Marisa	
1953	Two Nights with Cleopatra	Cleopatra / Nisca	
1953	Girls Marked Danger	Elvira	
1953	Good Folk's Sunday	Ines	
1953	Aida	Aida	
1953	Woman of the Red Sea	Barbara Lama	
1954	A Slice of Life	gazzara	Segment: "La macchina fotografica"
1954	A Day in Court	Anna	
1954	The Anatomy of Love	The girl	
1954	Poverty and Nobility	Gemma	
1954	Neapolitan Carousel	Sisina	
1954	Pilgrim of Love	Giulietta / Beppina Delli Colli	
1954	The Gold of Naples	Sofia	Segment: "Pizze a Credito"
1954	Attila	Honoria	
1954	Too Bad She's Bad	Lina Stroppiani	
1954	The River Girl	Nives Mongolini	
1955	The Sign of Venus	Agnese Tirabassi	
1955	The Miller's Beautiful Wife	Carmela	
1955	Scandal in Sorrento	Donna Sofia	
1956	Lucky to Be a Woman	Antonietta Fallari	
1957	Boy on a Dolphin	Phaedra	
1957	The Pride and the Passion	Juana	
1957	Legend of the Lost	Dita	
1958	Desire Under the Elms	Anna Cabot	
1958	The Key	Stella	
1958	The Black Orchid	Rose Bianco	
1958	Houseboat	Cinzia Zaccardi	
1959	That Kind of Woman	Kay	
1960	Heller in Pink Tights	Angela Rossini	
1960	It Started in Naples	Lucia Curio	
1960	The Millionairess	Epifania Parerga	
1960	A Breath of Scandal	Princess Olympia	
1960	Two Women	Cesira	
1961	El Cid	Ximena	
1961	Madame Sans-Gêne	Catherine Hubscher	
1962	Boccaccio '70	Zoe	Segment: "La Riffa"
1962	The Prisoners of Altona	Johanna	
1962	Five Miles to Midnight	Lisa Macklin	
1963	Yesterday, Today and Tomorrow	Adelina Sbaratti / Anna Molteni / Mara	
1964	The Fall of the Roman Empire	Lucilla	
1964	Marriage Italian Style	Filumena Marturano	
1965	Operation Crossbow	Nora	
1965	Lady L	Lady Louise Lendale / Lady L	
1966	Judith	Judith	
1966	Arabesque	Yasmin Azir	
1967	A Countess from Hong Kong	Natasha	
1967	More Than a Miracle	Isabella Candeloro	
1968	Ghosts – Italian Style	Maria Lojacono	
1970	Sunflower	Giovanna	
1970	The Priest's Wife	Valeria Billi	
1971	Lady Liberty	Maddalena Ciarrapico	
1972	Man of La Mancha	Aldonza / Dulcinea	
1973	White Sister	Hermana Germana	
1974	The Voyage	Adriana de Mauro	
1974	Verdict	Teresa Leoni	
1974	Brief Encounter	Anna Jesson	Television film
1975	Sex Pot	Pupa	
1976	The Cassandra Crossing	Jennifer Rispoli Chamberlain	
1977	A Special Day	Antoinette	
1978	Blood Feud	Titina Paterno	
1978	Brass Target	Mara / cameo role	
1978	Angela	Angela Kincaid	
1979	Firepower	Adele Tasca	
1980	Sophia Loren: Her Own Story	Herself / Romilda Villani (her mother)	
1984	Aurora	Aurora	Television film
1986	Courage	Marianna Miraldo	Television film
1988	The Fortunate Pilgrim	Lucia	Television miniseries
1989	Running Away	Cesira	Television miniseries
1990	Saturday, Sunday and Monday	Rosa Priore	
1994	Prêt-à-Porter	Isabella de la Fontaine	
1995	Grumpier Old Men	Maria Sophia Coletta Ragetti	
1997	Soleil	Maman Levy	
2001	Francesca e Nunziata	Francesca Montorsi	Television miniseries
2002	Between Strangers	Olivia	
2004	Too Much Romance... It's Time for Stuffed Peppers	Maria	
2004	Lives of the Saints	Teresa Innocente	Television miniseries
2009	Nine	Mamma	
2010	My House Is Full of Mirrors	Romilda Villani	Television miniseries
2011	Cars 2	Mama Topolino	Voice (Italian version)
2013	Mademoiselle C	Herself	Documentary
2014	La voce umana	One-woman film role	Short film
2015	Behind the White Glasses	Herself	Documentary
2016	Sophia Loren: Live from the TCM Classic Film Festival	Herself	Documentary
2020	The Life Ahead	Madame Rosa	
2020	Beautiful Like a Poem	Herself	Documentary
2021	What Would Sophia Loren Do?	Herself	Documentary

== Recognitions ==
=== Awards ===
Year	Organizations	Category	Work	Result
1958	Venice Film Festival	Volpi Cup for Best Actress	The Black Orchid	Won
1960	Golden Globe Awards	Best Actress in a Motion Picture – Musical or Comedy	It Started in Naples	Nominated
1960	Academy Awards	Best Actress	Two Women	Won
1960	BAFTA Awards	Best Film Foreign Actress	Two Women	Won
1960	Bambi Awards	Best International Actress	Two Women	Won
1960	Cannes Film Festival	Best Female Interpretation	Two Women	Won
1960	David di Donatello Awards	Best Actress in a Leading Role	Two Women	Won
1960	Silver Ribbon Awards	Best Leading Actress	Two Women	Won
1960	New York Film Critics Circle Awards	Best Actress	Two Women	Won
1960	Sant Jordi Awards	Best Performance in a Foreign Film	Two Women	Won
1962	TCL Theatre Prints Ceremony	Footprints and Handprints Ceremony	—N/a	Honored
1963	David di Donatello Awards	Best Actress in a Leading Role	Yesterday, Today and Tomorrow	Won
1963	Silver Ribbon Awards	Best Leading Actress	Yesterday, Today and Tomorrow	Nominated
1964	Academy Awards	Best Actress	Marriage Italian Style	Nominated
1964	Golden Globe Awards	Best Actress in a Motion Picture – Musical or Comedy	Marriage Italian Style	Nominated
1964	David di Donatello Awards	Best Actress in a Leading Role	Marriage Italian Style	Won
1964	Moscow Film Festival	Best Actress Award	Marriage Italian Style	Won
1964	Golden Laurel Awards	Best Actress	Marriage Italian Style	Won
1964	Silver Ribbon Awards	Best Leading Actress	Marriage Italian Style	Nominated
1967	Silver Ribbon Awards	Best Leading Actress	More Than a Miracle	Nominated
1970	David di Donatello Awards	Best Actress in a Leading Role	Sunflower	Won
1970	Fotogramas de Plata Awards	Best Foreign Performer	Sunflower	Nominated
1974	David di Donatello Awards	Best Actress in a Leading Role	The Voyage	Won
1974	San Sebastián Film Festival	Award for Best Actress	The Voyage	Won
1977	David di Donatello Awards	Best Actress in a Leading Role	A Special Day	Won
1977	Italian Golden Globe Awards	Best Lead Actress	A Special Day	Won
1977	Silver Ribbon Awards	Best Leading Actress	A Special Day	Won
1991	Academy Awards	Honorary Academy Award	—N/a	Honored
1991	César Awards	Honorary César Lifetime Achievement Award	—N/a	Honored
1994	Hollywood Walk of Fame	Hollywood Walk of Fame Star (Motion Picture Category)	—N/a	Honored
1994	National Board of Review of Motion Pictures Awards	Best Cast	Prêt-à-Porter	Won
1994	Golden Globe Awards	Best Supporting Actress – Motion Picture	Prêt-à-Porter	Nominated
1995	Golden Globe Awards	Cecil B. DeMille Award	—N/a	Honored
1995	Goldene Kamera Awards	Special Achievement Award	—N/a	Honored
1998	Venice Film Festival	Honorary Golden Lion Award for Lifetime Achievement	—N/a	Honored
1999	David di Donatello Awards	Special David Award for Career Achievement	—N/a	Honored
2000	Cairo International Film Festival	Career Achievement Award	—N/a	Honored
2004	Grammy Awards	Best Spoken Word Album for Children	Wolf Tracks and Peter and the Wolf	Won
2009	Critics' Choice Awards	Best Movie Cast	Nine	Nominated
2009	Satellite Awards	Best Cast in a Film	Nine	Won
2009	Screen Actors Guild Awards	Outstanding Performance by an Ensemble Cast in a Motion Picture	Nine	Nominated
2009	Washington D.C. Area Film Critics Association Awards	Best Ensemble	Nine	Nominated
2010	The Imperial Family of Japan; The Japan Art Association	Praemium Imperiale	—N/a	Honored
2014	David di Donatello Awards	Special David Award	La voce umana	Honored
2021	AARP Movies for Grownups Awards	Best Actress	The Life Ahead	Won
2021	Alliance of Women Film Journalists Awards	Actress Defying Age and Ageism Award	The Life Ahead	Won
2021	Alliance of Women Film Journalists Awards	Greatest Achievement by a Woman in the Film Industry Award	The Life Ahead	Nominated
2021	KCET Cinema Series	Lumière Award	The Life Ahead	Won
2021	Capri Hollywood Film Festival	Best Actress	The Life Ahead	Won
2021	CinEuphoria Awards	Best Actress	The Life Ahead	Won
2021	David di Donatello Awards	Best Actress in a Leading Role	The Life Ahead	Won

=== Box office rating ===
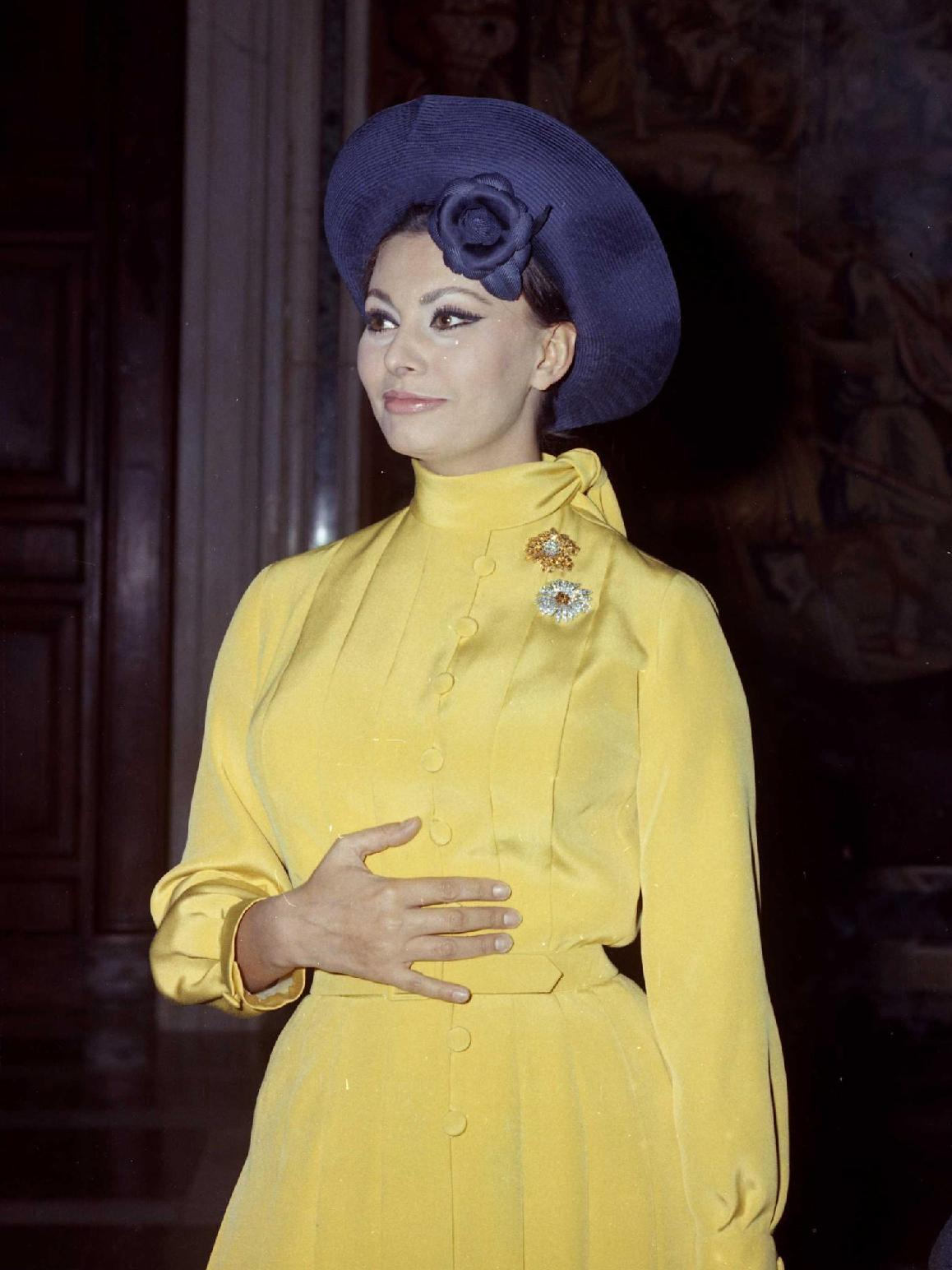
Loren at the Quirinal Palace in 1965

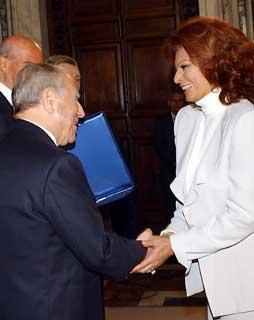
Loren accepting an award from Italian president Carlo Azeglio Ciampi in 2002

In The Motion Picture Herald, both British and American exhibitors voted for Loren within the Top Ten Money Making Stars Poll:

- 1960 – most popular actress (3rd most popular star in UK)
- 1961 – 2nd most popular actress (2nd most popular star in UK)
- 1962 – 3rd most popular actress (7th most popular star in UK)
- 1964 – most popular actress in UK, 24th most popular star in America
- 1965 – 4th most popular star in UK
- 1966 – 14th most popular star in America

=== Honours ===
- Knight of the Legion of Honour – France (1991)
- Knight Grand Cross of the Order of Merit of the Italian Republic – Italy (1996)

== Selected discography ==
=== Singles ===
- 1955 – "Mambo Bacan" (from La Fille du Fleuve) / "Nyves" (RCA 18.350 10" 78 rpm)
- 1956 – "Che m'e 'mparato a fà" / "I wanna a guy" (RCA, A25V-0473, 10" 78 rpm)
- 1957 – "S'agapò" / "Adoro te" (with Paola Orlandi) (RCA, A25V 0585, 10" 78 rpm)
- 1958 – "Bing! Bang! Bong!" (from Houseboat) / "Almost in Your Arms" (Philips PB 857 10" 78 rpm)
- 1960 – "Goodness Gracious Me" / "Grandpa's Grave" (with Peter Sellers) (Parlophone, 45-R.4702 7" 45 rpm)
- 1961 – "Zoo Be Zoo Be Zoo" / "Bangers and Mash" (with Peter Sellers) (Parlophone 45-R.4724 7" 45 rpm)

=== Albums ===
- 1958 – Houseboat (Philips – BBL 7292) – With George Duning and Cary Grant
- 1960 – Escandalos Imperiales (Heliodor – 610 800) – With Maurice Chevalier
- 1960 – Peter and Sophia (Parlophone – PCSM 3012, LP) – with Peter Sellers
- 1963 – Poesie di Salvatore Di Giacomo (CAM, LP)
- 1972 – Man of La Mancha (United Artists Records, LP) with Peter O'Toole, James Coco, Mitch Leigh, Joe Darion

=== Compilations ===
- 1992 – Le canzoni di Sophia Loren (CGD, 2xCD)
- 2006 – Secrets of Rome (Traditional Line, CD)
- 2009 – Τι Είναι Αυτό Που Το Λένε Αγάπη – Το Παιδί Και Το Δελφίνι (it:Δίφωνο, CD)

=== Russian National Orchestra ===
- Prokofiev – Peter and the Wolf, Jean-Pascal Beintus – Wolf Tracks. Mikhail Gorbachev, Bill Clinton, Sophia Loren. Russian National Orchestra – Kent Nagano. Pentatone PTC 5186011 (2003)
- Prokofiev – Pedro y el lobo, Jean-Pascal Beintus – Las Huellas del Lobo. Antonio Banderas, Sophia Loren, Russian National Orchestra – Kent Nagano. Pentatone PTC 5186014 (2004).

== Bibliography ==
- Loren, Sophia (2015). Yesterday, Today, Tomorrow; My Life. Atria Books. ISBN 9781476797434.
- Loren, Sophia (1998). Sophia Loren's Recipes and Memories, Gt Pub Corp. ISBN 978-1577193678.
- Loren, Sophia (1984). Women & Beauty, Aurum Press. ISBN 0-688-01394-5.
- Loren, Sophia (1972). In the Kitchen with Love, Doubleday, Library of Congress Catalog Card 79–183230.
- Loren, Sophia (1971), In Cucina con Amore, Rizzoli Editore.
