= Social Alternative =

Social Alternative Alternativa Sociale
- Leader: Alessandra Mussolini
- Founded: 2004
- Dissolved: 2006
- Ideology: Italian nationalism; Neo-fascism
- Political position: Far-right
- Colours: Blue

Social Alternative (Italian: Alternativa Sociale) was a coalition of far-right political parties in Italy.

== History ==
The coalition grew from Social Action, which was founded by Benito Mussolini's granddaughter Alessandra Mussolini after she left the National Alliance due to their attempts to move away from the party's fascist past. The group was committed to a strong Italian nationalism that celebrated and glorified its past, and has been particularly critical of Gianfranco Fini's modernisation of the right. The alliance was disbanded in late 2006 and replaced by a new pact between Social Action, New Force, the Social Idea Movement, and the National Volunteers.

== Elections ==
Mussolini united her group with the Social Action for the 2004 European Parliament election, getting 1.23% of the vote and gaining one seat in the European Parliament.

The Tricolour Flame joined the alliance for the 2005 regional elections, only to leave it some months later.

In the 2006 Italian general elections the coalition was a member of the defeated House of Freedoms and won no seats.
