= 2025–26 SS Lazio season =

Lazio
2025–26 season
- Owner: Claudio Lotito
- President: Claudio Lotito
- Head coach: Maurizio Sarri
- Stadium: Stadio Olimpico
- Serie A: 9th
- Coppa Italia: Runners-up
- Top goalscorer: League: Gustav Isaksen; Pedro (5 each); All: Gustav Isaksen; Tijjani Noslin; Pedro (5 each)
- Highest home attendance: 63,000 vs Roma; 21 September 2025 (Serie A)
- Lowest home attendance: 2,000 vs Sassuolo; 9 March 2026 (Serie A)
- Average home league attendance: 40,632
- Biggest win: 4–0 vs Hellas Verona (H); 31 August 2025 (Serie A)
- Biggest defeat: 0–3 vs Como (H); 19 January 2026 (Serie A); 0–3 vs Internazionale (H); 9 May 2026 (Serie A)
Home colours	Away colours	Third colours

The 2025–26 season was the 126th season in the history of SS Lazio, and the club's 38th consecutive season in Serie A. In addition to the domestic league, the club participated in the Coppa Italia, reaching the final.

== First-team squad ==
As of 2 February 2026

No.	Player	Nationality	Position	Date of birth (age)	Signed from	Signed in	Contract ends
Goalkeepers
40	Edoardo Motta	(Italy)	GK	13 January 2005 (aged 21)	Reggiana	2026	2030
55	Alessio Furlanetto	(Italy)	GK	7 February 2002 (aged 24)	Academy	2022	2028
94	Ivan Provedel	(Italy)	GK	17 March 1994 (aged 32)	Spezia	2022	2027
Defenders
2	Samuel Gigot	(France)	CB	12 October 1993 (aged 32)	(France) Marseille	2024	2027
3	Luca Pellegrini	(Italy)	LB / LWB	7 March 1999 (aged 27)	Juventus	2023	2027
4	Patric	(Spain)	CB / RB	17 April 1993 (aged 33)	(Spain) Barcelona Atlètic	2015	2027
13	Alessio Romagnoli	(Italy)	CB	12 January 1995 (aged 31)	Milan	2022	2027
17	Nuno Tavares	(Portugal)	LB / LWB	26 January 2000 (aged 26)	(England) Arsenal	2024	2029
23	Elseid Hysaj	(Albania)	RB / LB	2 February 1994 (aged 32)	Napoli	2021	2026
25	Oliver Provstgaard	(Denmark)	CB	4 June 2003 (aged 23)	(Denmark) Vejle	2025	2029
29	Manuel Lazzari	(Italy)	RWB / RB / RM	29 November 1993 (aged 32)	SPAL	2019	2027
34	Mario Gila	(Spain)	CB	29 August 2000 (aged 25)	(Spain) Real Madrid	2022	2027
77	Adam Marušić	(Montenegro)	RB / RWB / LB	17 October 1992 (aged 33)	(Belgium) Oostende	2017	2028
Midfielders
6	Nicolò Rovella	(Italy)	DM / CM	4 December 2001 (aged 24)	Juventus	2023	2028
7	Fisayo Dele-Bashiru	(Nigeria)	CM / AM	6 February 2001 (aged 25)	(Turkey) Hatayspor	2024	2028
21	Reda Belahyane	(Morocco)	DM	1 June 2004 (aged 22)	Hellas Verona	2025	2029
24	Kenneth Taylor	(Netherlands)	CM / AM / DM	16 May 2002 (aged 24)	(Netherlands) Ajax	2026	2030
26	Toma Bašić	(Croatia)	CM / DM	25 November 1996 (aged 29)	(France) Bordeaux	2021	2026
28	Adrian Przyborek	(Poland)	AM / CM	1 January 2007 (aged 19)	(Poland) Pogoń Szczecin	2026	2030
32	Danilo Cataldi	(Italy)	CM	6 August 1994 (aged 31)	Academy	2013	2027
Forwards
9	Pedro	(Spain)	RW / LW / AM	28 July 1987 (aged 38)	Roma	2021	2026
10	Mattia Zaccagni (C)	(Italy)	LW / CM / AM	16 June 1995 (aged 31)	Hellas Verona	2021	2029
14	Tijjani Noslin	(Netherlands)	RW / ST	7 July 1999 (aged 26)	Hellas Verona	2024	2029
18	Gustav Isaksen	(Denmark)	RW / LW / ST	19 April 2001 (aged 25)	(Denmark) Midtjylland	2023	2028
19	Boulaye Dia	(Senegal)	ST / AM	16 November 1996 (aged 29)	Salernitana (loan)	2024	2026
20	Petar Ratkov	(Serbia)	ST	18 August 2003 (aged 22)	(Austria) Red Bull Salzburg	2026	2030
22	Matteo Cancellieri	(Italy)	ST / RW / LW	12 February 2002 (aged 24)	Hellas Verona	2022	2027
27	Daniel Maldini	(Italy)	ST / AM	11 October 2001 (aged 24)	Atalanta (loan)	2026	2026
31	Saná Fernandes	(Guinea-Bissau)	RW / LW	10 March 2006 (aged 20)	Academy	2023	2028
Out on loan
35	Christos Mandas	(Greece)	GK	17 September 2001 (aged 24)	(Greece) OFI	2023	2029
—	Davide Renzetti	(Italy)	GK	9 June 2006 (aged 20)	Academy	2024	2027
—	Romano Floriani Mussolini	(Italy)	RB	27 January 2003 (aged 23)	Academy	2023	2027
—	Filipe Bordon	(Brazil)	CB	24 June 2005 (aged 21)	Academy	2024	2028
—	Mohamed Farès	(Algeria)	LB	15 February 1996 (aged 30)	SPAL	2020	2027
—	Gabriele Artistico	(Italy)	ST	14 July 2002 (aged 23)	Virtus Francavilla	2024	2028

== Transfers ==
=== Summer window ===
==== In ====
Date	Pos.	Player	From	Fee	Notes	Ref.
1 July 2025	DF	(Serbia) Dimitrije Kamenović	(Switzerland) Yverdon-Sport	Loan return		
1 July 2025	MF	(Italy) Danilo Cataldi	(Italy) Fiorentina	Loan return		
1 July 2025	FW	(Italy) Matteo Cancellieri	(Italy) Parma	Loan return		
1 July 2025	DF	(France) Samuel Gigot	(France) Marseille	€500,000	From loan to permanent transfer	
1 July 2025	DF	(Italy) Luca Pellegrini	(Italy) Juventus	€4,000,000	From loan to permanent transfer	
1 July 2025	DF	(Portugal) Nuno Tavares	(England) Arsenal	€5,000,000	From loan to permanent transfer	
1 July 2025	MF	(Italy) Nicolò Rovella	(Italy) Juventus	€17,000,000	From loan to permanent transfer	
1 July 2025	MF	(Nigeria) Fisayo Dele-Bashiru	(Turkey) Hatayspor	€3,430,000	From loan to permanent transfer	

==== Loans in ====
Date	Pos.	Player	From	Fee	Notes	Ref.

==== Out ====
Date	Pos.	Player	To	Fee	Notes	Ref.
30 June 2025	MF	(Germany) Arijon Ibrahimović	(Germany) Bayern Munich	End of loan		
30 June 2025	MF	(Italy) André Anderson	Unattached	Free	End of contract	
30 June 2025	MF	(Ivory Coast) Jean-Daniel Akpa Akpro	(Italy) Hellas Verona	Free	End of contract	
30 June 2025	DF	(Italy) Nicolò Casale	(Italy) Bologna	€6,500,000	From loan to permanent transfer	
2 July 2025	FW	(France) Loum Tchaouna	(England) Burnley	€15,150,000	+ €3,000,000 bonus	
9 July 2025	FW	(Italy) Valerio Crespi	(Italy) Avellino	Undisclosed		
6 August 2025	MF	(Italy) Marco Bertini	(Italy) Pianese	Free		
13 August 2025	DF	(Italy) Fabio Andrea Ruggeri	(Italy) Carrarese	Free		
21 August 2025	MF	(Italy) Gaetano Castrovilli	(Italy) Bari	Free		

==== Loans out ====
Date	Pos.	Player	To	Fee	Notes	Ref.
10 July 2025	DF	(Brazil) Filipe Bordon	(Italy) Südtirol	Free	Option to buy for an undisclosed fee, buy-back option for an undisclosed fee	
12 July 2025	FW	(Italy) Gabriele Artistico	(Italy) Spezia	Free	Option to buy for an undisclosed fee, buy-back option for an undisclosed fee	
14 July 2025	DF	(Italy) Romano Floriani Mussolini	(Italy) Cremonese	Free	Option to buy for €5,000,000	
8 August 2025	GK	(Italy) Davide Renzetti	(Italy) Bra	Free		
2 October 2025	DF	(Algeria) Mohamed Farès	(United Arab Emirates) Forte Virtus	Free	Option to buy for €5,000,000	

=== Winter window ===
==== In ====
Date	Pos.	Player	From	Fee	Notes	Ref.
8 January 2026	FW	(Serbia) Petar Ratkov	(Austria) Red Bull Salzburg	€13,000,000		
9 January 2026	MF	(Netherlands) Kenneth Taylor	(Netherlands) Ajax	€16,850,000		
27 January 2026	GK	(Italy) Edoardo Motta	(Italy) Reggiana	€1,200,000		
31 January 2026	MF	(Poland) Adrian Przyborek	(Poland) Pogoń Szczecin	€4,500,000		

==== Loans in ====
Date	Pos.	Player	From	Fee	Notes	Ref.
27 January 2026	FW	(Italy) Daniel Maldini	(Italy) Atalanta	€1,000,000	Option to buy for €14,000,000, obligation under certain conditions	

==== Out ====
Date	Pos.	Player	To	Fee	Notes	Ref.
4 January 2026	FW	(Paraguay) Diego González	(Mexico) Atlas	€1,200,000		
5 January 2026	FW	(Argentina) Valentín Castellanos	(England) West Ham United	€29,000,000		
8 January 2026	MF	(France) Mattéo Guendouzi	(Turkey) Fenerbahçe	€28,000,000	+ €2,000,000 add-ons	
17 January 2026	DF	(Serbia) Dimitrije Kamenović	(Croatia) Lokomotiva Zagreb	Free		
2 February 2026	MF	(Uruguay) Matías Vecino	(Spain) Celta Vigo	Free		

==== Loans out ====
Date	Pos.	Player	To	Fee	Notes	Ref.
27 January 2026	GK	(Greece) Christos Mandas	(England) Bournemouth	€1,500,000	Option to buy	

== Friendlies ==
=== Pre-season ===
Win Draw Loss Fixtures

26 July 2025 Friendly	Avellino	0–1	Lazio	Frosinone
22:30 CEST (UTC+2)			Guendouzi 90+1'	Stadium: Stadio Benito Stirpe

30 July 2025 Friendly	Fenerbahçe (Turkey)	1–0	Lazio	Istanbul, Turkey
20:30 CEST (UTC+2)	? 59'			Stadium: Ülker Stadium

2 August 2025 Friendly	Galatasaray (Turkey)	2–2	Lazio	Istanbul, Turkey
21:00 CEST (UTC+2)	? 10', 74'		Sánchez 33' (o.g.); Zaccagni 45+1'	Stadium: Rams Park

9 August 2025 Friendly	Burnley (England)	0–1	Lazio	Burnley, England
18:30 CEST (UTC+2)			Cancellieri 75'	Stadium: Turf Moor

16 August 2025 Friendly	Lazio	2–0	(Greece) Atromitos	Rieti
18:30 CEST (UTC+2)	Noslin 76'; Pedro 90'			Stadium: Stadio Centro d'Italia – Manlio Scopigno

== Competitions ==
=== Overall record ===
Competition	First match	Last match	Starting round	Final position	Record							
Competition	First match	Last match	Starting round	Final position	Pld	W	D	L	GF	GA	GD	Win %
Serie A	24 August 2025	23 May 2026	Matchday 1	9th	38	14	12	12	41	40	+1	36.84
Coppa Italia	4 December 2025	13 May 2026	Round of 16	Runners-up	5	1	3	1	5	6	−1	20.00
Total					43	15	15	13	46	46	+0	34.88

Source: Soccerway

=== Serie A ===
==== League table ====
Pos	Team	Pld	W	D	L	GF	GA	GD	Pts	Qualification or relegation
7	Atalanta	38	15	14	9	51	36	+15	59	Qualification for the UEFA Conference League play-off round (Note: Since the 2025–26 Coppa Italia winners, Inter Milan, qualified for the Champions League via league position, the Europa League spot awarded to the cup winners was passed to the sixth-placed team, and the Conference League spot was moved down one league position.)
8	Bologna	38	16	8	14	49	46	+3	56	
9	Lazio	38	14	12	12	41	40	+1	54	
10	Udinese	38	14	8	16	45	48	−3	50	
11	Sassuolo	38	14	7	17	46	50	−4	49	

Source: Serie A
Rules for classification: 1) Points; 2) Tiebreaker for Champions team and third relegated team; 3) Head-to-head points; 4) Head-to-head goal difference; 5) Goal difference; 6) Goals scored; 7) Draw.
(Note: Head-to-head record is used only after all the matches between the teams in question have been played)

==== Results summary ====
Overall								Home						Away					
Pld	W	D	L	GF	GA	GD	Pts	W	D	L	GF	GA	GD	W	D	L	GF	GA	GD
38	14	12	12	41	40	+1	54	8	6	5	27	25	+2	6	6	7	14	15	−1

Source: Serie A

==== Results by round ====
Round	1	2	3	4	5	6	7	8	9	10	11	12	13	14	15	16	17	18	19	20	21	22	23	24	25	26	27	28	29	30	31	32	33	34	35	36	37	38
Ground	A	H	A	H	A	H	A	H	A	H	A	H	A	H	A	H	A	H	H	A	H	A	H	A	H	A	A	H	H	A	H	A	A	H	A	H	A	H
Result	L	W	L	L	W	D	D	W	D	W	L	W	L	D	W	D	D	L	D	W	L	D	W	D	L	D	L	W	W	W	D	L	W	D	W	L	L	W
Position	17	7	12	13	12	13	12	10	11	8	9	8	8	10	8	8	8	9	9	8	9	9	8	8	9	10	11	10	9	8	9	9	9	8	8	9	9	9

Source: Serie A
A = Away; H = Home; W = Win; D = Draw; L = Loss

==== Matches ====
The league fixtures were announced on 6 June 2025.

24 August 2025 1	Como	2–0	Lazio	Como
18:30 CEST (UTC+2)	Paz (yellow card) 17', (goal) 73'; Van Der Brempt (yellow card) 38'; Douvikas 47'	Report	Zaccagni (yellow card) 30'; Guendouzi (yellow card) 75'; Castellanos (yellow card) 75'	Stadium: Stadio Giuseppe Sinigaglia; Attendance: 12,055; Referee: Gianluca Manganiello

31 August 2025 2	Lazio	4–0	Hellas Verona	Rome
20:45 CEST (UTC+2)	Guendouzi 3'; Zaccagni 10'; Castellanos 41'; Dia 82'	Report		Stadium: Stadio Olimpico; Attendance: 43,500; Referee: Valerio Crezzini

14 September 2025 3	Sassuolo	1–0	Lazio	Reggio Emilia
18:00 CEST (UTC+2)	Vranckx (yellow card) 24'; Muharemović (yellow card) 45+4'; Doig (yellow card) 58'; Fadera 70'; Pinamonti (yellow card) 77'; Matić (yellow card) 90'; Volpato (yellow card) 90+5'	Report	Rovella (yellow card) 28'; Marušić (yellow card) 42'; Belahyane (yellow card) 85'	Stadium: Mapei Stadium – Città del Tricolore; Attendance: 15,016; Referee: Paride Tremolada

21 September 2025 4	Lazio	0–1	Roma	Rome
12:30 CEST (UTC+2)	Belahyane (red card) 85'; Gila (yellow card) 88'; Guendouzi (red card) 90+7'	Report	Pellegrini 38'; Ndicka (yellow card) 83'	Stadium: Stadio Olimpico; Attendance: 63,000; Referee: Simone Sozza

29 September 2025 5	Genoa	0–3	Lazio	Genoa
20:45 CEST (UTC+2)	Vásquez (yellow card) 1'; Norton-Cuffy (yellow card) 17'; Masini (yellow card) 51'; Malinovskyi (yellow card) 62'; Østigård (yellow card) 90+3'	Report	Cancellieri 4'; Castellanos 30'; Cataldi (yellow card) 36'; Zaccagni 63'	Stadium: Stadio Luigi Ferraris; Attendance: 30,824; Referee: Giovanni Ayroldi

4 October 2025 6	Lazio	3–3	Torino	Rome
15:00 CEST (UTC+2)	Cancellieri 24', 40'; Romagnoli (yellow card) 47'; Cataldi (yellow card) 87', (goal) 90+13' (pen.); Castellanos (yellow card) 90+6'	Report	Simeone 16'; Asllani (yellow card) 32'; Casadei (yellow card) 60'; Adams 73'; Coco 90+3'; Maripán (yellow card) 90+12'	Stadium: Stadio Olimpico; Attendance: 39,000; Referee: Marco Piccinini

19 October 2025 7	Atalanta	0–0	Lazio	Bergamo
18:00 CEST (UTC+2)	De Ketelaere (yellow card) 29'; Sulemana (yellow card) 40'; Pašalić (yellow card) 53'; Hien (yellow card) 62'	Report		Stadium: Gewiss Stadium; Attendance: 22,342; Referee: Giuseppe Collu

26 October 2025 8	Lazio	1–0	Juventus	Rome
20:45 CET (UTC+1)	Bašić 9'; Lazzari (yellow card) 33'; Guendouzi (yellow card) 90+1'	Report	Koopmeiners (yellow card) 30'; Locatelli (yellow card) 52'; McKennie (yellow card) 54'; Kelly (yellow card) 64'	Stadium: Stadio Olimpico; Attendance: 56,000; Referee: Andrea Colombo

30 October 2025 9	Pisa	0–0	Lazio	Pisa
20:45 CET (UTC+1)	Denoon (yellow card) 41'; Cuadrado (yellow card) 61'	Report	Guendouzi (yellow card) 74'; Pedro (yellow card) 82'	Stadium: Arena Garibaldi; Attendance: 10,101; Referee: Davide Massa

3 November 2025 10	Lazio	2–0	Cagliari	Rome
20:45 CET (UTC+1)	Isaksen 65'; Zaccagni 90+1'	Report	Gaetano (yellow card) 46'; Felici (yellow card) 59'	Stadium: Stadio Olimpico; Attendance: 35,000; Referee: Juan Luca Sacchi

9 November 2025 11	Internazionale	2–0	Lazio	Milan
20:45 CET (UTC+1)	L. Martínez 3'; Akanji (yellow card) 33'; Sučić (yellow card) 37'; Dumfries (yellow card) 52'; Bonny 62'	Report	Zaccagni (yellow card) 72'	Stadium: San Siro; Attendance: 73,797; Referee: Gianluca Manganiello

23 November 2025 12	Lazio	2–0	Lecce	Rome
18:00 CET (UTC+1)	Guendouzi 29', (yellow card) 79'; Noslin 90+5'	Report	N'Dri (yellow card) 82'	Stadium: Stadio Olimpico; Attendance: 25,000; Referee: Alberto Arena

29 November 2025 13	Milan	1–0	Lazio	Milan
20:45 CET (UTC+1)	Tomori (yellow card) 26'; Leão 51'; Gabbia (yellow card) 64'; Ricci (yellow card) 90'	Report	Pellegrini (yellow card) 57'; Romagnoli (yellow card) 72'; Zaccagni (yellow card) 90+13'	Stadium: San Siro; Attendance: 73,156; Referee: Giuseppe Collu

7 December 2025 14	Lazio	1–1	Bologna	Rome
18:00 CET (UTC+1)	Tavares (yellow card) 20'; Isaksen 38'; Lazzari (yellow card) 67'; Gila (yellow card) 78', (red card) 79'	Report	Moro (yellow card) 30'; Odgaard 40'; Cambiaghi (yellow card) 49'; Miranda (yellow card) 84'	Stadium: Stadio Olimpico; Attendance: 43,325; Referee: Michael Fabbri

13 December 2025 15	Parma	0–1	Lazio	Parma
18:00 CET (UTC+1)	Valeri (yellow card) 51'; Estévez (yellow card) 78'	Report	Zaccagni (red card) 42'; Cancellieri (yellow card) 63'; Bašić (red card) 78'; Noslin 82'	Stadium: Stadio Ennio Tardini; Attendance: 19,893; Referee: Matteo Marchetti

20 December 2025 16	Lazio	0–0	Cremonese	Rome
18:00 CET (UTC+1)	Pedro (yellow card) 38'; Romagnoli (yellow card) 77'; Guendouzi (yellow card) 80'; Gila (yellow card) 90+2'	Report	Grassi (yellow card) 43'; Barbieri (yellow card) 68'; Pezzella (yellow card) 81'; Ceccherini (red card) 90+4'	Stadium: Stadio Olimpico; Attendance: 37,000; Referee: Luca Pairetto

27 December 2025 17	Udinese	1–1	Lazio	Udine
18:00 CET (UTC+1)	Zaniolo (yellow card) 13'; Kabasele (yellow card) 51'; Karlström (yellow card) 77'; Davis 90+5'	Report	Cataldi (yellow card) 14'; Cancellieri (yellow card) 40'; Solet 80' (o.g.); Pellegrini (yellow card) 84'; Vecino (yellow card) 89'	Stadium: Stadio Friuli; Attendance: 24,460; Referee: Andrea Colombo

4 January 2026 18	Lazio	0–2	Napoli	Rome
12:30 CET (UTC+1)	Zaccagni (yellow card) 43'; Cataldi (yellow card) 64'; Noslin (yellow card) 69' (red card) 81'; Romagnoli (yellow card) 82'; Marušić (red card) 88'	Report	Spinazzola 13'; Rrahmani 32', (yellow card) 69'; Mazzocchi (red card) 87'	Stadium: Stadio Olimpico; Attendance: 45,000; Referee: Davide Massa

7 January 2026 19	Lazio	2–2	Fiorentina	Rome
20:45 CET (UTC+1)	Cancellieri (yellow card) 26'; Cataldi 52'; Zaccagni (yellow card) 83'; Pellegrini (yellow card) 90+1'; Pedro 90+5' (pen.)	Report	Pongračić (yellow card) 20'; Gosens (yellow card) 21', (goal) 56'; Parisi (yellow card) 55'; Fagioli (yellow card) 71'; Guðmundsson 89' (pen.); Nicolussi Caviglia (yellow card) 90+8'	Stadium: Stadio Olimpico; Attendance: 35,000; Referee: Simone Sozza

11 January 2026 20	Hellas Verona	0–1	Lazio	Verona
18:00 CET (UTC+1)	Bella-Kotchap (yellow card) 6'; Valentini (yellow card) 25'	Report	Cancellieri (yellow card) 18'; Nelsson 79' (o.g.)	Stadium: Stadio Marcantonio Bentegodi; Attendance: 22,029; Referee: Marco Guida

19 January 2026 21	Lazio	0–3	Como	Rome
20:45 CET (UTC+1)	Zaccagni (yellow card) 21'; Romagnoli (yellow card) 42'; Cataldi (yellow card) 44'; Pellegrini (yellow card) 58'	Report	Baturina 2'; Smolčić (yellow card) 22'; Paz 24', 49', (penalty missed) 35'; Posch (yellow card) 75'; Valle (yellow card) 89'	Stadium: Stadio Olimpico; Attendance: 35,000; Referee: Michael Fabbri

24 January 2026 22	Lecce	0–0	Lazio	Lecce
20:45 CET (UTC+1)	Veiga (yellow card) 52'; Tiago Gabriel (yellow card) 90+1'	Report	Provstgaard (yellow card) 73'	Stadium: Stadio Via del mare Attendance: 24,435; Referee: Daniele Chiffi

30 January 2026 23	Lazio	3–2	Genoa	Rome
20:45 CET (UTC+1)	Pedro 56' (pen.); Taylor 62'; Provedel (yellow card) 67'; Pellegrini (yellow card) 74'; Cataldi 90+10' (pen.)	Report	Malinovskyi (yellow card) 64', (goal) 67' (pen.); Østigård (yellow card) 72'; Vitinha 75'; Norton-Cuffy (yellow card) 90+3'	Stadium: Stadio Olimpico; Attendance: 5,402; Referee: Luca Zufferli

8 February 2026 24	Juventus	2–2	Lazio	Turin
20:45 CET (UTC+1)	McKennie 59'; Kalulu 90+6'	Report	Taylor (yellow card) 33'; Pedro 45+2'; Isaksen 47'; Romagnoli (yellow card) 81'	Stadium: Juventus Stadium; Attendance: 41,405; Referee: Marco Guida

14 February 2026 25	Lazio	0–2	Atalanta	Rome
18:00 CET (UTC+1)	Taylor (yellow card) 78'	Report	Scalvini (yellow card) 10'; Ahanor (yellow card) 11'; Éderson 41' (pen.); Zalewski 60'; Bernasconi (yellow card) 74'; Djimsiti (yellow card) 90'	Stadium: Stadio Olimpico; Attendance: 3,400; Referee: Juan Luca Sacchi

21 February 2026 26	Cagliari	0–0	Lazio	Cagliari
20:45 CET (UTC+1)	Mina (yellow card) 25' (yellow-red card) 85'; Zé Pedro (yellow card) 56'	Report	Pellegrini (yellow card) 45+1'; Provstgaard (yellow card) 64'	Stadium: Unipol Domus; Attendance: 15,262; Referee: Antonio Rapuano

1 March 2026 27	Torino	2–0	Lazio	Turin
18:00 CET (UTC+1)	Simeone 21'; Gineitis (yellow card) 45+1'; Zapata 53'; Vlašić (yellow card) 79'; Tameze (yellow card) 90+1'; Kulenović (yellow card) 90+2'	Report	Tavares (yellow card) 90+3'	Stadium: Stadio Olimpico Grande Torino; Attendance: 15,000; Referee: Rosario Abisso

9 March 2026 28	Lazio	2–1	Sassuolo	Rome
20:45 CET (UTC+1)	Maldini 2'; Marušić 90+2'	Report	Laurienté 35', (yellow card) 86'; Lipani (yellow card) 37'; Garcia (yellow card) 58'; Walukiewicz (yellow card) 88'	Stadium: Stadio Olimpico; Attendance: 2,000; Referee: Alberto Arena

15 March 2026 29	Lazio	1–0	Milan	Rome
20:45 CET (UTC+1)	Isaksen 26'; Motta (yellow card) 70'; Tavares (yellow card) 81'; Pedro (yellow card) 90+4'; Patric (yellow card) 90+5'	Report	Estupiñán (yellow card) 55'	Stadium: Stadio Olimpico; Attendance: 50,000; Referee: Marco Guida

22 March 2026 30	Bologna	0–2	Lazio	Bologna
15:00 CET (UTC+1)	Orsolini (penalty missed) 51'; Castro (yellow card) 65'	Report	Taylor 72', 82', (yellow card) 77'	Stadium: Stadio Renato Dall'Ara; Attendance: 27,539; Referee: Ermanno Feliciani

4 April 2026 31	Lazio	1–1	Parma	Rome
20:45 CEST (UTC+2)	Noslin 77', (yellow card) 87'	Report	Del Prato 15'; Strefezza (yellow card) 27'; Pellegrino (yellow card) 32'	Stadium: Stadio Olimpico; Attendance: 6,000; Referee: Matteo Marcenaro

13 April 2026 32	Fiorentina	1–0	Lazio	Florence
20:45 CEST (UTC+2)	Gosens 28'; Rugani (yellow card) 31'; Dodô (yellow card) 80'; Piccoli (yellow card) 90+1'	Report	Noslin (yellow card) 64'; Pedro (yellow card) 90+4'	Stadium: Stadio Artemio Franchi; Attendance: 18,259; Referee: Michael Fabbri

18 April 2026 33	Napoli	0–2	Lazio	Naples
18:00 CEST (UTC+2)	Lobotka (yellow card) 29'	Report	Cancellieri 6'; Zaccagni (penalty missed) 31'; Cataldi (yellow card) 33'; Bašić 57'; Taylor (yellow card) 60'; Dia (yellow card) 90+1'	Stadium: Stadio Diego Armando Maradona; Attendance: 50,000; Referee: Luca Zufferli

27 April 2026 34	Lazio	3–3	Udinese	Rome
20:45 CEST (UTC+2)	Cancellieri (yellow card) 41'; Pellegrini 50', (yellow card) 57'; Pedro 80'; Maldini 90+5'; Patric (yellow card) 90+7'	Report	Ehizibue 18'; Atta 86', 90+3'; Zarraga (yellow card) 90'	Stadium: Stadio Olimpico; Attendance: 4,000; Referee: Kevin Bonacina

4 May 2026 35	Cremonese	1–2	Lazio	Cremona
18:30 CEST (UTC+2)	Bonazzoli 29'; Barbieri (yellow card) 75'	Report	Provstgaard (yellow card) 40'; Isaksen 53'; Tavares (yellow card) 88'; Noslin 90+2'	Stadium: Stadio Giovanni Zini; Attendance: 10,618; Referee: Daniele Chiffi

9 May 2026 36	Lazio	0–3	Internazionale	Rome
18:00 CEST (UTC+2)	Pellegrini (yellow card) 48'; Romagnoli (red card) 59'; Noslin (yellow card) 74'	Report	L. Martínez 6'; Sučić 39'; Mkhitaryan 76', (yellow card) 85'	Stadium: Stadio Olimpico; Attendance: 23,979; Referee: Rosario Abisso

17 May 2026 37	Roma	2–0	Lazio	Roma
12:00 CEST (UTC+2)	Mancini 40', 66'; Hermoso (yellow card) 43'; Wesley (red card) 71'; El Shaarawy (yellow card) 85'	Report	Taylor (yellow card) 22'; Cancellieri (yellow card) 42'; Tavares (yellow card) 64'; Rovella (red card) 71'	Stadium: Stadio Olimpico; Attendance: 50,152; Referee: Fabio Maresca

23 May 2026 38	Lazio	2–1	Pisa	Rome
20:45 CEST (UTC+2)	Gila (yellow card) 10'; Noslin (yellow card) 30'; Dele-Bashiru 33'; Pedro 35'	Report	Moreo 23'; Piccinini (yellow card) 73'	Stadium: Stadio Olimpico; Attendance: 6,886; Referee: Maria Sole Ferrieri Caputi

=== Coppa Italia ===
4 December 2025 Round of 16	Lazio	1–0	Milan	Rome
21:00 CET (UTC+1)	Zaccagni 80'	Report	Pavlović (yellow card) 2'; De Winter (yellow card) 84'	Stadium: Stadio Olimpico; Attendance: 41,718; Referee: Marco Guida

11 February 2026 Quarter-finals	Bologna	1–1 (1–4 p)	Lazio	Bologna
21:00 CET (UTC+1)	Castro 30', (yellow card) 47'; Miranda (yellow card) 74'; Vitík (yellow card) 90+1'	Report	Gila (yellow card) 9'; Noslin 48'; Tavares (yellow card) 86'	Stadium: Stadio Renato Dall'Ara; Attendance: 17,249; Referee: Daniele Chiffi
	Penalties
	Ferguson (penalty missed); Dallinga (penalty scored); Orsolini (penalty missed)		(penalty scored) Tavares; (penalty scored) Dia; (penalty scored) Marušić; (penalty scored) Taylor

4 March 2026 Semi-finals; First leg	Lazio	2–2	Atalanta	Rome
21:00 CET (UTC+1)	Dele-Bashiru 47'; Dia 87'	Report	De Roon (yellow card) 23'; Pašalić 51', (yellow card) 69'; Musah 89'; Hien (yellow card) 90+5'	Stadium: Stadio Olimpico; Attendance: 5,000; Referee: Gianluca Manganiello

22 April 2026 Semi-finals; Second leg	Atalanta	1–1 (a.e.t.) (3–3 agg.) (1–2 p)	Lazio	Bergamo
21:00 CEST (UTC+2)	Kolašinac (yellow card) 31'; Pašalić 86'; Scamacca (yellow card) 117'	Report	Cancellieri (yellow card) 37'; Romagnoli 84'; Lazzari (yellow card) 120'	Stadium: Stadio Atleti Azzurri d'Italia; Attendance: 21,915; Referee: Andrea Colombo
	Penalties
	Raspadori (penalty scored); Scamacca (penalty missed); Zappacosta (penalty missed); Pašalić (penalty missed); De Ketelaere (penalty missed)		(penalty missed) Tavares; (penalty missed) Cataldi; (penalty scored) Isaksen; (penalty scored) Taylor

13 May 2026 Final	Lazio	0–2	Internazionale	Rome
21:00 CEST (UTC+2)	Gila (yellow card) 38'; Zaccagni (yellow card) 85'; Pedro (yellow card) 85'	Report	Bisseck (yellow card) 7'; Marušić 14' (o.g.); Bastoni (yellow card) 16'; L. Martínez 35'; Dimarco (yellow card) 85'; Barella (yellow card) 85'	Stadium: Stadio Olimpico; Attendance: 68,729; Referee: Marco Guida

== Statistics ==
=== Appearances and goals ===
No.	Pos	Nat	Player	Total		Serie A		Coppa Italia	
No.	Pos	Nat	Player	Apps	Goals	Apps	Goals	Apps	Goals
Goalkeepers
40	GK	(Italy) ITA	Edoardo Motta	11	0	9	0	2	0
55	GK	(Italy) ITA	Alessio Furlanetto	2	0	2	0	0	0
94	GK	(Italy) ITA	Ivan Provedel	29	0	27	0	2	0
Defenders
2	DF	(France) FRA	Samuel Gigot	0	0	0	0	0	0
3	DF	(Italy) ITA	Luca Pellegrini	26	1	17+7	1	2	0
4	DF	(Spain) ESP	Patric	16	0	6+8	0	2	0
13	DF	(Italy) ITA	Alessio Romagnoli	37	1	31+1	0	5	1
17	DF	(Portugal) POR	Nuno Tavares	28	0	17+6	0	3+2	0
23	DF	(Albania) ALB	Elseid Hysaj	5	0	1+4	0	0	0
25	DF	(Denmark) DEN	Oliver Provstgaard	27	0	13+13	0	0+1	0
34	DF	(Spain) ESP	Mario Gila	36	0	31	0	5	0
77	DF	(Montenegro) MNE	Adam Marušić	38	1	32+1	1	5	0
Midfielders
6	MF	(Italy) ITA	Nicolò Rovella	13	0	6+5	0	1+1	0
7	MF	(Nigeria) NGR	Fisayo Dele-Bashiru	28	2	11+13	1	2+2	1
10	MF	(Italy) ITA	Mattia Zaccagni	30	4	26	3	4	1
21	MF	(Morocco) MAR	Reda Belahyane	14	0	5+8	0	0+1	0
24	MF	(Netherlands) NED	Kenneth Taylor	21	3	17	3	4	0
26	MF	(Croatia) CRO	Toma Bašić	26	2	23	2	3	0
28	MF	(Poland) POL	Adrian Przyborek	1	0	0+1	0	0	0
29	MF	(Italy) ITA	Manuel Lazzari	25	0	9+14	0	0+2	0
32	MF	(Italy) ITA	Danilo Cataldi	30	3	24+3	3	1+2	0
Forwards
9	FW	(Spain) ESP	Pedro	33	5	9+20	5	1+3	0
14	FW	(Netherlands) NED	Tijjani Noslin	34	5	9+20	4	2+3	1
18	FW	(Denmark) DEN	Gustav Isaksen	35	5	18+12	5	4+1	0
19	FW	(Senegal) SEN	Boulaye Dia	30	2	14+13	1	0+3	1
20	FW	(Serbia) SRB	Petar Ratkov	8	0	2+6	0	0	0
22	FW	(Italy) ITA	Matteo Cancellieri	35	4	21+9	4	1+4	0
27	FW	(Italy) ITA	Daniel Maldini	14	2	9+3	2	2	0
31	FW	(Guinea-Bissau) GBS	Saná Fernandes	0	0	0	0	0	0
Players loaned/transferred out during the season
5	MF	(Uruguay) URU	Matías Vecino	14	0	5+8	0	1	0
8	MF	(France) FRA	Mattéo Guendouzi	17	2	16	2	1	0
11	FW	(Argentina) ARG	Valentín Castellanos	12	2	8+3	2	1	0
35	GK	(Greece) GRE	Christos Mandas	1	0	0	0	1	0

Source: Competitions
