= 2022–23 SS Lazio season =

SS Lazio
2022–23 season
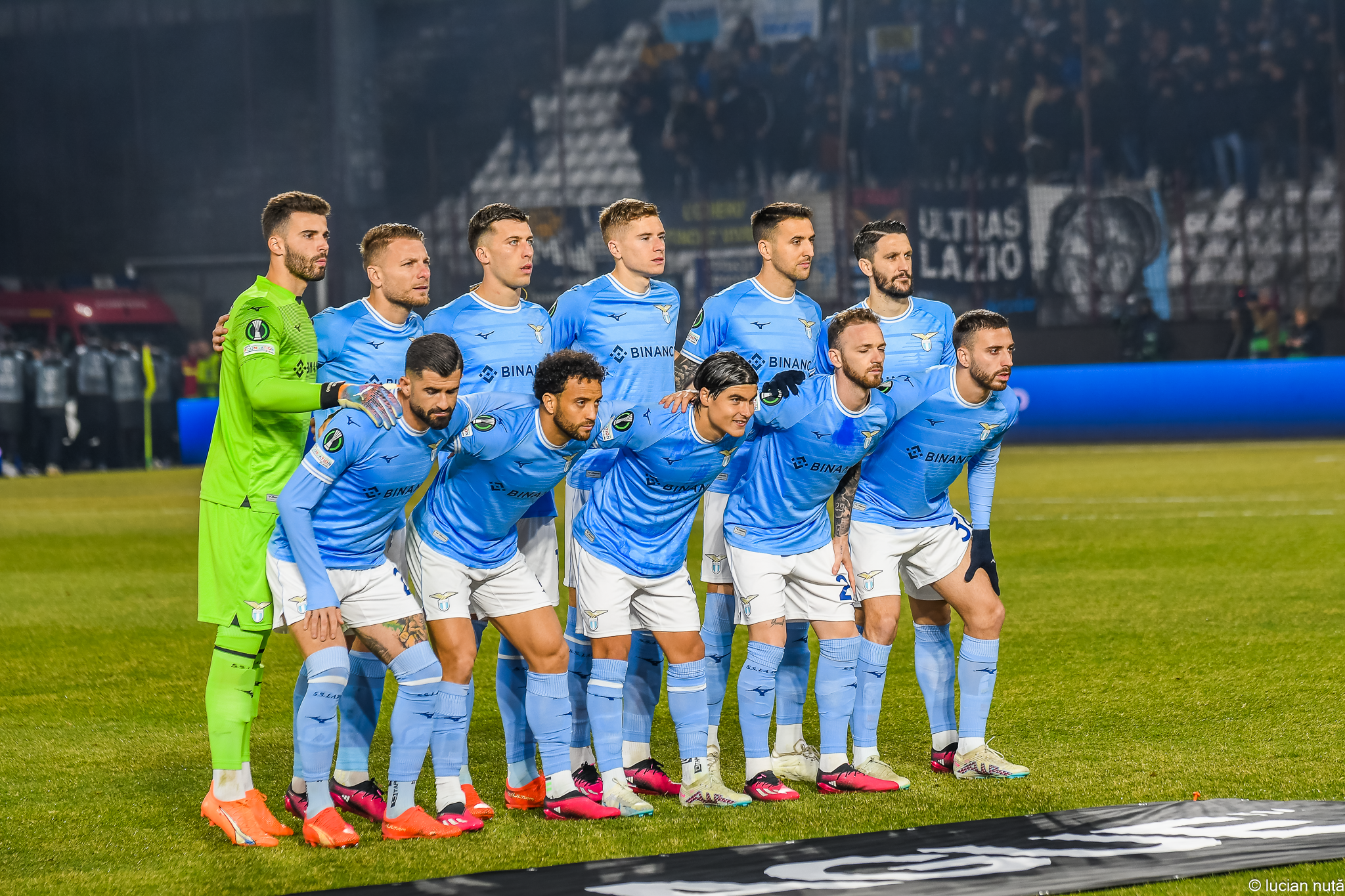
- Lazio players lining up before a UEFA Europa Conference League match against CFR Cluj in February 2023
- Chairman: Claudio Lotito
- Head coach: Maurizio Sarri
- Stadium: Stadio Olimpico
- Serie A: 2nd
- Coppa Italia: Quarter-finals
- UEFA Europa League: Group stage
- UEFA Europa Conference League: Round of 16
- Top goalscorer: League: Ciro Immobile (12); All: Ciro Immobile (14)
Home colours	Away colours	Third colours

The 2022–23 season was the 123rd in the history of SS Lazio and their 35th consecutive season in the top flight. The club participated in Serie A, the Coppa Italia, the UEFA Europa League, and the UEFA Europa Conference League.

== First-team squad ==
As of 28 May 2023

Note: Flags indicate national team as defined under FIFA eligibility rules; some limited exceptions apply. Players may hold more than one non-FIFA nationality.

No.	Pos.	Nation	Player
1	GK	POR	Luís Maximiano
3	DF	ITA	Luca Pellegrini (on loan from Juventus)
4	MF	ESP	Patric
5	MF	URU	Matías Vecino
6	MF	BRA	Marcos Antônio
7	MF	BRA	Felipe Anderson
9	FW	ESP	Pedro
10	FW	ESP	Luis Alberto
11	FW	ITA	Matteo Cancellieri (on loan from Hellas Verona)
13	DF	ITA	Alessio Romagnoli
15	DF	ITA	Nicolò Casale
17	FW	ITA	Ciro Immobile (captain)
18	FW	ARG	Luka Romero
20	MF	ITA	Mattia Zaccagni
21	MF	SRB	Sergej Milinković-Savić

No.	Pos.	Nation	Player
22	FW	PAR	Diego González (on loan from Celaya)
23	DF	ALB	Elseid Hysaj
26	DF	ROU	Ștefan Radu
29	MF	ITA	Manuel Lazzari
31	GK	LTU	Marius Adamonis
32	MF	ITA	Danilo Cataldi
34	DF	ESP	Mario Gila
44	DF	ITA	Romano Floriani Mussolini
50	MF	ITA	Marco Bertini
61	GK	ITA	Federico Magro
77	DF	MNE	Adam Marušić
88	MF	CRO	Toma Bašić
94	GK	ITA	Ivan Provedel
96	MF	ALG	Mohamed Farès

== Transfers ==
=== In ===
Date	Pos.	Player	Age	Moving from	Fee	Notes	Source
1 July 2022	MF	(Brazil) Marcos Antônio	22	(Ukraine) Shakhtar Donetsk	€7,500,000	Plus €2M in add-ons	
1 July 2022	MF	(Italy) Mattia Zaccagni	27	(Italy) Hellas Verona	€7,100,000		
1 July 2022	FW	(Italy) Matteo Cancellieri	20	(Italy) Hellas Verona	Loan	Loan until the end of the season with option to buy for €7M, plus €1.5M in add-ons	
8 July 2022	DF	(Italy) Nicolò Casale	24	(Italy) Hellas Verona	€7,000,000		
12 July 2022	DF	(Italy) Alessio Romagnoli	27	(Italy) Milan	Free		
12 July 2022	DF	(Spain) Mario Gila	21	(Spain) Real Madrid	€6,000,000		
13 July 2022	GK	(Portugal) Luís Maximiano	23	(Spain) Granada	€10,100,000		
1 August 2022	MF	(Uruguay) Matías Vecino	30	(Italy) Internazionale	Free		
8 August 2022	GK	(Italy) Ivan Provedel	28	(Italy) Spezia	€2,000,000		
31 January 2023	DF	(Italy) Luca Pellegrini	23	(Italy) Juventus	Loan	Loan until the end of the season with option to buy	

=== Out ===
Date	Pos.	Player	Age	Moving to	Fee	Notes	Source
30 June 2022	FW	(Argentina) Joaquín Correa	27	(Italy) Internazionale	€23,600,000		
30 June 2022	MF	(Brazil) Lucas Leiva	35	(Brazil) Grêmio	Free		
30 June 2022	GK	(Albania) Thomas Strakosha	27	(England) Brentford	Free	End of contract	
30 June 2022	DF	(Italy) Luiz Felipe	25	(Spain) Real Betis	Free	End of contract	
30 June 2022	DF	(Portugal) Jorge Silva	23	Free agent	Free	End of contract	
30 June 2022	DF	(Belgium) Jordan Lukaku	27	(Spain) Ponferradina	Free	End of contract	
30 June 2022	FW	(Netherlands) Bobby Adekanye	23	(Netherlands) Go Ahead Eagles	Free		
30 June 2022	FW	(Cape Verde) Jovane Cabral	24	(Portugal) Sporting CP	End of loan		
6 July 2022	DF	(Slovakia) Denis Vavro	26	(Denmark) Copenhagen	€4,500,000		
8 July 2022	GK	(Spain) Pepe Reina	39	(Spain) Villarreal	Free		
11 July 2022	DF	(Argentina) Tiago Casasola	26	(Italy) Perugia	Free		
13 July 2022	DF	(Albania) Angelo Ndrecka	20	(Italy) Pro Patria	Free		
19 July 2022	MF	(Italy) Fabio Maistro	24	(Italy) SPAL	Free		
22 July 2022	FW	(Kosovo) Vedat Muriqi	28	(Spain) Mallorca	€8,000,000	Plus €2.5M in add-ons	
25 July 2022	DF	(Italy) Luca Falbo	22	(Italy) Monopoli	Free		
27 July 2022	FW	(Italy) Emanuele Cicerelli	27	(Italy) Reggina	Loan	Loan until the end of the season	
27 July 2022	DF	(Italy) Nicolò Armini	21	(Italy) Potenza	Loan	Loan until the end of the season	
27 July 2022	GK	(Albania) Marco Alia	22	(Italy) Monterosi	Free		
3 August 2022	FW	(Italy) Cristiano Lombardi	27	(Italy) Triestina	Loan	Loan until the end of the season	
4 August 2022	DF	(Italy) Mattia Novella	21	(Italy) Picerno	Loan	Loan until 30 June 2024	
9 August 2022	MF	(Argentina) Gonzalo Escalante	29	(Italy) Cremonese	Loan	Loan until 24 January 2023	
25 January 2023	MF	(Argentina) Gonzalo Escalante	29	(Spain) Cádiz CF	Loan	Loan until the end of the season	
14 August 2022	FW	(Italy) Alessandro Rossi	25	(Italy) Monterosi	Loan	Loan until the end of the season	
23 August 2022	MF	(Spain) Raúl Moro	19	(Italy) Ternana	Loan	Loan until 24 January 2023	
25 January 2023	MF	(Spain) Raúl Moro	20	(Spain) Real Oviedo	Loan	Loan until the end of the season	
31 August 2022	MF	(Poland) Patryk Dziczek	24	(Poland) Piast Gliwice	Free		
1 September 2022	DF	(Italy) Francesco Acerbi	34	(Italy) Internazionale	Loan	Loan until the end of the season	
1 September 2022	MF	(Ivory Coast) Jean-Daniel Akpa Akpro	29	(Italy) Empoli	Loan	Loan until the end of the season	
1 September 2022	DF	(Netherlands) Djavan Anderson	27	(England) Oxford	Free		
1 September 2022	DF	(Denmark) Riza Durmisi	28	(Spain) Leganés	Loan	Loan until the end of the season	
1 September 2022	MF	(Italy) Biagio Morrone	22	(Italy) Recanatese	Free		
1 January 2023	LB	(Serbia) Dimitrije Kamenović	22	(Czech Republic) Sparta Prague	Loan	Loan until the end of the season	

== Pre-season and friendlies ==
Win Draw Loss Fixtures

10 July 2022 Friendly	Lazio (Italy)	21–0	(Italy) Auronzo	Auronzo di Cadore, Italy
18:00 CEST (UTC+2)	Bašić 4', 31'; Luis Alberto 5', 8'; Cancellieri 6', 11'; De Mario 16' (o.g.); Pedro 27', 41'; Felipe Anderson 49', 58', 63', 64'; Romero 54', 78'; Moro 68', 84'; Akpa Akpro 73', 90'; Kiyine 76', 86'	Report		Stadium: Stadio Rodolfo Zandegiacomo

14 July 2022 Friendly	Lazio (Italy)	5–0	(Slovenia) Dekani	Auronzo di Cadore, Italy
18:00 CEST (UTC+2)	Immobile 33'; Pedro 38' (pen.), 45'; Bašić 53'; Zaccagni 80' (pen.)	Report		Stadium: Stadio Rodolfo Zandegiacomo; Referee: Michele Maccorin (Italy)

17 July 2022 Friendly	Lazio (Italy)	3–1	(Italy) Triestina	Auronzo di Cadore, Italy
18:00 CEST (UTC+2)	Immobile 25' (pen.); Bašić 62'; Bertini 83'	Report	Gómez 65'	Stadium: Stadio Rodolfo Zandegiacomo; Referee: Bogdan Nicolae Sfira

22 July 2022 Friendly	Lazio (Italy)	Cancelled	(Italy) Venezia	Auronzo di Cadore, Italy
12:00 CEST (UTC+2)				Stadium: Stadio Rodolfo Zandegiacomo

22 July 2022 Friendly	Lazio (Italy)	4–0	(Slovenia) Primorje	Auronzo di Cadore, Italy
18:00 CEST (UTC+2)	Milinković-Savić 17'; Pedro 21'; Cataldi 50'; Cancellieri 86'	Report		Stadium: Stadio Rodolfo Zandegiacomo; Referee: Marco Zini (Italy)

27 July 2022 Friendly	Lazio (Italy)	1–4	(Italy) Genoa	Kössen, Austria
17:00 CEST (UTC+2)	Immobile 14'	Report	Coda 5', 18', 51'; Guðmundsson 54' (pen.)	Stadium: Kaiserwinkl Arena; Referee: Felix Brych (Germany)

30 July 2022 Friendly	Lazio (Italy)	0–0	Qatar	Salzburg, Austria
18:00 CEST (UTC+2)	Immobile (penalty missed) 9'; Marušić (yellow card) 57'	Report		Stadium: HCS-Arena Nonntal; Referee: Andreas Gruber (Austria)

6 August 2022 Trofeo Ciudad de Valladolid	Valladolid (Spain)	0–0 (4–1 p)	(Italy) Lazio	Valladolid, Spain
20:00 CEST (UTC+2)	Escudero (yellow card) 31'; Monchu (yellow card) 84'; García (yellow card) 89'	Report	Patric (yellow card) 33'; Cataldi (yellow card) 33'; Pedro (yellow card) 33'; Lazzari (yellow card) 53'; Vecino (yellow card) 82'	Stadium: Estadio José Zorrilla; Attendance: 9,010; Referee: Alejandro Muñiz Ruiz (Spain)
	Penalties
	J. Sánchez (penalty scored); Olaza (penalty scored); I. Sánchez (penalty scored); El Yamiq (penalty scored)		(penalty scored) Zaccagni; (penalty missed) Milinković-Savić; (penalty missed) Vecino

13 December 2022 Friendly	Galatasaray (Turkey)	1–2	(Italy) Lazio	Manavgat, Turkey
10:05 TRT (UTC+3)	B. Yılmaz 4'	Report	Felipe Anderson 11'; Luis Alberto 46'; Zaccagni (yellow card) 60'	Stadium: Emirhan Sport Complex; Referee: Batuhan Kolak (Turkey)

16 December 2022 Friendly	Hatayspor (Turkey)	2–5	(Italy) Lazio	Manavgat, Turkey
10:00 TRT (UTC+3)	El Kaabi 37'; Zé Luís 48'	Report	Vecino 34'; Immobile 39' (pen.); Pedro 40'; Zaccagni 63' (pen.); Romero 74'	Stadium: Emirhan Sport Complex

22 December 2022 Friendly	Almería (Spain)	2–0	(Italy) Lazio	Almería, Spain
18:30 CET (UTC+1)	Ramazani (yellow card) 24'; De la Hoz (yellow card) 25'; Touré 35'; Ramazani 46'	Report		Stadium: Power Horse Stadium; Referee: José María Sánchez Martínez (Spain)

== Competitions ==
=== Overall record ===
Competition	First match	Last match	Starting round	Final position	Record							
Competition	First match	Last match	Starting round	Final position	Pld	W	D	L	GF	GA	GD	Win %
Serie A	14 August 2022	3 June 2023	Matchday 1	2nd	38	22	8	8	60	30	+30	57.89
Coppa Italia	19 January 2023	2 February 2023	Round of 16	Quarter-finals	2	1	0	1	1	1	+0	50.00
UEFA Europa League	8 September 2022	3 November 2022	Group stage	Group stage	6	2	2	2	9	11	−2	33.33
UEFA Europa Conference League	16 February 2023	16 March 2023	Knockout round play-offs	Round of 16	4	1	1	2	3	4	−1	25.00
Total					50	26	11	13	73	46	+27	52.00

Source: Soccerway

=== Serie A ===
==== League table ====
Pos	Team	Pld	W	D	L	GF	GA	GD	Pts	Qualification or relegation
1	Napoli (C)	38	28	6	4	77	28	+49	90	Qualification for the Champions League group stage (Note: Should the first and second, or 17th and 18th-placed teams at the end of the season be tied on points, a play-off tiebreaker match was held at a neutral site to determine the title and final team relegated respectively.)
2	Lazio	38	22	8	8	60	30	+30	74	Qualification for the Champions League group stage
3	Inter Milan	38	23	3	12	71	42	+29	72	Qualification for the Champions League group stage
4	Milan	38	20	10	8	64	43	+21	70	Qualification for the Champions League group stage
5	Atalanta	38	19	7	12	66	48	+18	64	Qualification for the Europa League group stage (Note: Since the winners of the 2022–23 Coppa Italia, Inter Milan, qualified for the Champions League, the Europa League berth awarded to the Coppa Italia winners was passed to the sixth-placed team, and the Europa Conference League berth awarded to the sixth-placed team was passed to the seventh-placed team.)

Source: Serie A
Rules for classification: 1) Points; 2) Tiebreaker for Champions team and third relegated team; 3) Head-to-head points; 4) Head-to-head goal difference; 5) Goal difference; 6) Goals scored; 7) Draw. (Note: Head-to-head record is used only after all the matches between the teams in question have been played)
(C) Champions

==== Results summary ====
Overall								Home						Away					
Pld	W	D	L	GF	GA	GD	Pts	W	D	L	GF	GA	GD	W	D	L	GF	GA	GD
38	22	8	8	60	30	+30	74	11	4	4	32	18	+14	11	4	4	28	12	+16

Source: Serie A

==== Results by round ====
Round	1	2	3	4	5	6	7	8	9	10	11	12	13	14	15	16	17	18	19	20	21	22	23	24	25	26	27	28	29	30	31	32	33	34	35	36	37	38
Ground	H	A	H	A	H	H	A	H	A	H	A	H	A	H	A	A	H	A	H	H	A	H	A	H	A	A	H	A	H	A	H	A	H	A	H	A	H	A
Result	W	D	W	D	L	W	W	W	W	D	W	L	W	W	L	L	D	W	W	D	D	L	W	W	W	D	W	W	W	W	L	L	W	L	D	W	W	W
Position	6	8	3	7	9	7	4	4	3	5	3	5	3	2	4	5	5	5	3	3	4	6	5	4	3	3	2	2	2	2	2	2	2	3	4	2	2	2
Points	3	4	7	8	8	11	14	17	20	21	24	24	27	30	30	30	31	34	37	38	39	39	42	45	48	49	52	55	58	61	61	61	64	64	65	68	71	74

Source: Serie A
A = Away; H = Home; W = Win; D = Draw; L = Loss

==== Matches ====
The league fixtures were announced on 24 June 2022.

14 August 2022 1	Lazio	2–1	Bologna	Rome
18:30 CEST (UTC+2)	Maximiano (red card) 6'; De Silvestri 68' (o.g.); Lazzari (yellow card) 71'; Immobile 79', (yellow card) 90'	Report	Sansone (yellow card) 23'; Arnautović 38' (pen.), (yellow card) 39'; Soumaoro (yellow card) 40' (yellow-red card) 45+3'; Cambiaso (yellow card) 53'; Aebischer (yellow card) 86'	Stadium: Stadio Olimpico; Attendance: 45,000; Referee: Luca Massimi

20 August 2022 2	Torino	0–0	Lazio	Turin
18:30 CEST (UTC+2)		Report	Cataldi (yellow card) 49'; Antônio (yellow card) 73'; Lazzari (yellow card) 90+3'; Milinković-Savić (yellow card) 90+4'; Immobile (yellow card) 90+4'	Stadium: Stadio Olimpico Grande Torino; Attendance: 16,530; Referee: Marco Piccinini

26 August 2022 3	Lazio	3–1	Internazionale	Rome
20:45 CEST (UTC+2)	Felipe Anderson 40'; Zaccagni (yellow card) 57'; Marušić (yellow card) 64'; Luis Alberto 75'; Pedro 86'	Report	Martínez 51'; Brozović (yellow card) 84'	Stadium: Stadio Olimpico; Attendance: 56,000; Referee: Michael Fabbri

31 August 2022 4	Sampdoria	1–1	Lazio	Genoa
18:30 CEST (UTC+2)	Gabbiadini 90+2'	Report	Immobile 21'; Zaccagni (yellow card) 71'; Bašić (yellow card) 90+5'	Stadium: Stadio Luigi Ferraris; Attendance: 18,499; Referee: Gianluca Aureliano

3 September 2022 5	Lazio	1–2	Napoli	Rome
20:45 CEST (UTC+2)	Zaccagni 4'; Milinković-Savić (yellow card) 67'; Cataldi (yellow card) 70'; Felipe Anderson (yellow card) 70'; Marušić (yellow card) 90+4'	Report	Kim 38'; Kvaratskhelia 61'	Stadium: Stadio Olimpico; Attendance: 39,000; Referee: Simone Sozza

11 September 2022 6	Lazio	2–0	Hellas Verona	Rome
18:00 CEST (UTC+2)	Immobile 68'; Luis Alberto (yellow card) 79', (goal) 90+5'; Hysaj (yellow card) 83'	Report	Veloso (yellow card) 35'; Ceccherini (yellow card) 44'; Coppola (yellow card) 63'; Cabal (yellow card) 66'; Hien (yellow card) 80'	Stadium: Stadio Olimpico; Attendance: 38,000; Referee: Massimiliano Irrati

18 September 2022 7	Cremonese	0–4	Lazio	Genoa
15:00 CEST (UTC+2)	Vásquez (yellow card) 74'	Report	Immobile 7', 21' (pen.); Casale (yellow card) 38'; Milinković-Savić 45+2'; Pedro 79'	Stadium: Stadio Luigi Ferraris; Attendance: 12,991; Referee: Daniele Orsato

2 October 2022 8	Lazio	4–0	Spezia	Rome
12:30 CEST (UTC+2)	Immobile (penalty missed) 3'; Zaccagni 12'; Romagnoli 24'; Milinković-Savić 62', 90+1'	Report	Ampadu (yellow card) 1'; Gyasi (yellow card) 45+1'	Stadium: Stadio Olimpico; Attendance: 42,500; Referee: Juan Luca Sacchi

10 October 2022 9	Fiorentina	0–4	Lazio	Florence
20:45 CEST (UTC+2)	Amrabat (yellow card) 24'; Igor (yellow card) 27'; Mandragora (yellow card) 68'; Dodô (yellow card) 70'	Report	Vecino 11'; Zaccagni 25'; Lazzari (yellow card) 78'; Luis Alberto 85'; Immobile 90+1'	Stadium: Stadio Artemio Franchi; Attendance: 30,574; Referee: Fabio Maresca

16 October 2022 10	Lazio	0–0	Udinese	Rome
15:00 CEST (UTC+2)	Milinković-Savić (yellow card) 74'	Report	Becão (yellow card) 7'; Pérez (yellow card) 53'; Lovrić (yellow card) 79'; Ehizibue (yellow card) 90+3'	Stadium: Stadio Olimpico; Attendance: 47,000; Referee: Andrea Colombo

23 October 2022 11	Atalanta	0–2	Lazio	Bergamo
20:45 CEST (UTC+2)	Okoli (yellow card) 12'; Soppy (yellow card) 45+1'; Muriel (yellow card) 59' (yellow-red card) 90'	Report	Zaccagni 10'; Felipe Anderson 52'; Cataldi (yellow card) 70'; Milinković-Savić (yellow card) 88'	Stadium: Gewiss Stadium; Attendance: 18,988; Referee: Rosario Abisso

30 October 2022 12	Lazio	1–3	Salernitana	Rome
18:00 CET (UTC+1)	Zaccagni 41'; Milinković-Savić (yellow card) 72'; Marušić (yellow card) 75'; Cancellieri (yellow card) 90+6'	Report	Candreva 51'; Coulibaly (yellow card) 56'; Fazio 68'; Dia 76', (yellow card) 90+6'; Sepe (yellow card) 90+5'	Stadium: Stadio Olimpico; Attendance: 41,500; Referee: Gianluca Manganiello

6 November 2022 13	Roma	0–1	Lazio	Rome
18:00 CET (UTC+1)	Mancini (yellow card) 8'; Patrício (yellow card) 87'; Radu (yellow card) 89'	Report	Lazzari (yellow card) 25'; Felipe Anderson 29'; Vecino (yellow card) 50'	Stadium: Stadio Olimpico; Attendance: 62,847; Referee: Daniele Orsato

10 November 2022 14	Lazio	1–0	Monza	Rome
20:45 CET (UTC+1)	Casale (yellow card) 63'; Romero 69'; Marušić (yellow card) 75'	Report	Donati (yellow card) 45+1'	Stadium: Stadio Olimpico; Attendance: 35,000; Referee: Alberto Santoro

13 November 2022 15	Juventus	3–0	Lazio	Turin
20:45 CET (UTC+1)	Gatti (yellow card) 25'; Bremer (yellow card) 27'; Kean 43', 54'; Milik 90'	Report	Milinković-Savić (yellow card) 28'	Stadium: Juventus Stadium; Attendance: 38,729; Referee: Davide Massa

4 January 2023 16	Lecce	2–1	Lazio	Lecce
16:30 CET (UTC+1)	Banda (yellow card) 6'; Gallo (yellow card) 48'; Strefezza 57'; Colombo 71'; Hjulmand (yellow card) 78'	Report	Immobile 14'; Casale (yellow card) 37'; Cancellieri (yellow card) 90+2'	Stadium: Stadio Via del mare Attendance: 26,084; Referee: Livio Marinelli

8 January 2023 17	Lazio	2–2	Empoli	Rome
15:00 CET (UTC+1)	Felipe Anderson 2'; Lazzari (yellow card) 43'; Zaccagni 54'; Romagnoli (yellow card) 68'; Pedro (yellow card) 70'; Vecino (yellow card) 90+2'	Report	Bandinelli (yellow card) 72'; Caputo 83'; Marin 90+3'	Stadium: Stadio Olimpico; Attendance: 35,000; Referee: Ivano Pezzuto

15 January 2023 18	Sassuolo	0–2	Lazio	Reggio Emilia
12:30 CET (UTC+1)	Toljan (yellow card) 45+1'; Ruan (yellow card) 45+2'; Rogério (yellow card) 64'; Erlić (yellow card) 83'; Lopez (yellow card) 88'	Report	Casale (yellow card) 18'; Cataldi (yellow card) 45+2'; Zaccagni 45+3'; Hysaj (yellow card) 65'; Felipe Anderson 90+4'	Stadium: Mapei Stadium – Città del Tricolore; Attendance: 10,059; Referee: Luca Pairetto

24 January 2023 19	Lazio	4–0	Milan	Rome
20:45 CET (UTC+1)	Milinković-Savić 4', (yellow card) 33'; Zaccagni 38'; Luis Alberto 67' (pen.); Felipe Anderson 75'	Report	Bennacer (yellow card) 26'; Kjær (yellow card) 54'	Stadium: Stadio Olimpico; Attendance: 45,000; Referee: Marco Di Bello

29 January 2023 20	Lazio	1–1	Fiorentina	Rome
18:00 CET (UTC+1)	Casale 8'; Zaccagni (yellow card) 45+2'; Immobile (yellow card) 90+3'	Report	Kouamé (yellow card) 40'; González 49'; Saponara (yellow card) 67'; Amrabat (yellow card) 68'	Stadium: Stadio Olimpico; Attendance: 40,000; Referee: Andrea Colombo

6 February 2023 21	Hellas Verona	1–1	Lazio	Verona
18:30 CET (UTC+1)	Duda (yellow card) 24'; Magnani (yellow card) 34'; Ngonge 51'; Hien (yellow card) 81'; Depaoli (yellow card) 87'	Report	Zaccagni (yellow card) 28'; Pedro 45'	Stadium: Stadio Marcantonio Bentegodi; Attendance: 20,329; Referee: Giovanni Ayroldi

11 February 2023 22	Lazio	0–2	Atalanta	Rome
20:45 CET (UTC+1)	Zaccagni (yellow card) 40'	Report	Zappacosta 23'; Scalvini (yellow card) 57'; De Roon (yellow card) 60'; Højlund 65'	Stadium: Stadio Olimpico; Attendance: 40,000; Referee: Daniele Orsato

19 February 2023 23	Salernitana	0–2	Lazio	Salerno
15:00 CET (UTC+1)	Pirola (yellow card) 55'; Valencia (yellow card) 83'; Bronn (yellow card) 88' (yellow-red card) 89'; Daniliuc (yellow card) 90+1'	Report	Vecino (yellow card) 44'; Immobile 60', 69' (pen.); Luis Alberto (penalty missed) 90'	Stadium: Stadio Arechi; Attendance: 14,860; Referee: Rosario Abisso

27 February 2023 24	Lazio	1–0	Sampdoria	Rome
20:45 CET (UTC+1)	Vecino (yellow card) 71'; Casale (yellow card) 78'; Luis Alberto 80'	Report	Léris (yellow card) 49'; Gabbiadini (yellow card) 67'	Stadium: Stadio Olimpico; Attendance: 35,000; Referee: Andrea Colombo

3 March 2023 25	Napoli	0–1	Lazio	Naples
20:45 CET (UTC+1)	Osimhen (yellow card) 63'; Elmas (yellow card) 89'	Report	Patric (yellow card) 21'; Vecino 67'; Marušić (yellow card) 90+4'	Stadium: Stadio Diego Armando Maradona; Attendance: 54,000; Referee: Luca Pairetto

11 March 2023 26	Bologna	0–0	Lazio	Bologna
20:45 CET (UTC+1)	Moro (yellow card) 24'; Ferguson (yellow card) 34'	Report	Hysaj (yellow card) 21'; Vecino (yellow card) 45+1'; Zaccagni (yellow card) 75'	Stadium: Stadio Renato Dall'Ara; Attendance: 27,369; Referee: Fabio Maresca

19 March 2023 27	Lazio	1–0	Roma	Rome
18:00 CET (UTC+1)	Luis Alberto (yellow card) 25'; Romagnoli (yellow card) 59'; Zaccagni 65'; Cancellieri (yellow card) 89'; Bašić (yellow card) 90+2'; Marušić (red card) 90+7'	Report	Ibañez (yellow card) 8' (yellow-red card) 32'; Cristante (yellow card) 72', (red card) 90+7'; Mancini (yellow card) 80'	Stadium: Stadio Olimpico; Attendance: 60,000; Referee: Davide Massa
Note: Marušić and Cristante received red cards following the final whistle.

2 April 2023 28	Monza	0–2	Lazio	Monza
15:00 CET (UTC+1)	Ciurria (yellow card) 47'; Caprari (yellow card) 48'; Marlon (yellow card) 52'; Donati (yellow card) 55'	Report	Pedro 13'; Milinković-Savić 56'; Zaccagni (yellow card) 59'; Felipe Anderson (yellow card) 80'	Stadium: Stadio Brianteo; Attendance: 14,539; Referee: Matteo Marcenaro

8 April 2023 29	Lazio	2–1	Juventus	Rome
20:45 CEST (UTC+2)	Milinković-Savić 38', (yellow card) 86'; Zaccagni 53'; Provedel (yellow card) 78'	Report	Rabiot 42'; Alex Sandro (yellow card) 45'; Locatelli (yellow card) 45+3'; Cuadrado (yellow card) 51'; Miretti (yellow card) 90+5'	Stadium: Stadio Olimpico; Attendance: 59,000; Referee: Marco Di Bello

14 April 2023 30	Spezia	0–3	Lazio	La Spezia
20:45 CEST (UTC+2)	Gyasi (yellow card) 30'; Ampadu (yellow card) 33' (yellow-red card) 84'	Report	Immobile 36' (pen.); Felipe Anderson 52'; Cataldi (yellow card) 72'; Antônio (yellow card) 81', (goal) 89'; Romagnoli (yellow card) 83'; Cancellieri (yellow card) 89'	Stadium: Stadio Alberto Picco; Attendance: 9,500; Referee: Massimiliano Irrati

22 April 2023 31	Lazio	0–1	Torino	Rome
18:00 CEST (UTC+2)	Romagnoli (yellow card) 48'; Lazzari (yellow card) 79'	Report	Linetty (yellow card) 25'; Ilić 43'; Rodriguez (yellow card) 62'; Singo (yellow card) 63'; Gravillon (yellow card) 78'	Stadium: Stadio Olimpico; Attendance: 51,000; Referee: Davide Ghersini

30 April 2023 32	Internazionale	3–1	Lazio	Milan
12:30 CEST (UTC+2)	D'Ambrosio (yellow card) 35'; Bastoni (yellow card) 62'; Martínez 78', 90'; Gosens 83'	Report	Zaccagni (yellow card) 20'; Felipe Anderson 30'; Marušić (yellow card) 81'; Luis Alberto (yellow card) 83'; Romagnoli (yellow card) 90+8'	Stadium: San Siro; Attendance: 75,500; Referee: Marco Guida

3 May 2023 33	Lazio	2–0	Sassuolo	Rome
21:00 CEST (UTC+2)	Felipe Anderson 14'; Luis Alberto (yellow card) 40'; Marušić (yellow card) 62'; Lazzari (yellow card) 84'; Bašić 90+2'	Report	Laurienté (yellow card) 27'; Berardi (yellow card) 41'; Ruan (yellow card) 51'; Zortea (yellow card) 60'; Toljan (yellow card) 82'	Stadium: Stadio Olimpico; Attendance: 38,000; Referee: Massimiliano Irrati

6 May 2023 34	Milan	2–0	Lazio	Milan
15:00 CEST (UTC+2)	Bennacer 17'; Hernandez 29'; Calabria (yellow card) 42'; Thiaw (yellow card) 89'	Report	Romagnoli (yellow card) 20'; Marušić (yellow card) 24'; Casale (yellow card) 61'; Pellegrini (yellow card) 88'	Stadium: San Siro; Attendance: 72,365; Referee: Antonio Rapuano

12 May 2023 35	Lazio	2–2	Lecce	Rome
20:45 CEST (UTC+2)	Lazzari (yellow card) 8'; Immobile 34'; Pellegrini (yellow card) 78'; Milinković-Savić (yellow card) 81', (goal) 90+4'	Report	Banda (yellow card) 13'; Strefezza (penalty missed) 23'; Oudin 45+2', 51', (yellow card) 65'; Falcone (yellow card) 79'; Blin (yellow card) 82'; Gonzàlez (yellow card) 90+3'	Stadium: Stadio Olimpico; Attendance: 44,500; Referee: Fabio Maresca

21 May 2023 36	Udinese	0–1	Lazio	Udine
20:45 CEST (UTC+2)	Udogie (yellow card) 39'; Pereyra (yellow card) 71'; Bijol (yellow card) 90+1'	Report	Felipe Anderson (yellow card) 22'; Immobile 61' (pen.)	Stadium: Stadio Friuli; Attendance: 21,834; Referee: Luca Pairetto

28 May 2023 37	Lazio	3–2	Cremonese	Rome
18:00 CEST (UTC+2)	Hysaj 4'; Milinković-Savić 37', 89'; Zaccagni (yellow card) 72'; Pellegrini (yellow card) 81'	Report	Sernicola (yellow card) 24'; Galdames 54', (yellow card) 66'; Lazzari 58' (o.g.)	Stadium: Stadio Olimpico; Attendance: 64,171; Referee: Antonio Giua

3 June 2023 38	Empoli	0–2	Lazio	Empoli
21:00 CEST (UTC+2)	Akpa Akpro (yellow card) 14'; Cambiaghi (yellow card) 37' (yellow-red card) 89'	Report	Milinković-Savić (yellow card) 40'; Romagnoli 48'; Vecino (yellow card) 62'; Luis Alberto 90+2'	Stadium: Stadio Carlo Castellani; Attendance: 11,545; Referee: Luca Massimi

=== Coppa Italia ===
19 January 2023 Round of 16	Lazio	1–0	Bologna	Rome
18:00 CET (UTC+1)	Felipe Anderson 33'; Zaccagni (yellow card) 61'; Luis Alberto (yellow card) 79'	Report	Sosa (yellow card) 57'; Zirkzee (yellow card) 88'	Stadium: Stadio Olimpico; Attendance: 30,000; Referee: Niccolo Baroni

2 February 2023 Quarter-finals	Juventus	1–0	Lazio	Turin
21:00 CET (UTC+1)	Bremer 44'; Cuadrado (yellow card) 65'; Perin (yellow card) 79'; Danilo (yellow card) 84'	Report	Zaccagni (yellow card) 68'	Stadium: Juventus Stadium; Attendance: 21,581; Referee: Fabio Maresca

=== UEFA Europa League ===
==== Group stage ====
The draw for the group stage was held on 26 August 2022.

Pos	Team	Pld	W	D	L	GF	GA	GD	Pts	Qualification	FEY	MID	LAZ	STU
1	(Netherlands) Feyenoord	6	2	2	2	13	9	+4	8 (Note: Tied on head-to-head results. Overall goal difference is used as the tiebreaker. Between Feyenoord and Midtjylland, overall goals scored is used as the tiebreaker.)	Advance to round of 16	—	2–2	1–0	6–0
2	(Denmark) Midtjylland	6	2	2	2	12	8	+4	8	Advance to knockout round play-offs	2–2	—	5–1	2–0
3	(Italy) Lazio	6	2	2	2	9	11	−2	8	Transfer to Europa Conference League	4–2	2–1	—	2–2
4	(Austria) Sturm Graz	6	2	2	2	4	10	−6	8		1–0	1–0	0–0	—

Source: UEFA
Rules for classification: Group stage tiebreakers
Notes:

8 September 2022 1	Lazio (Italy)	4–2	(Netherlands) Feyenoord	Rome
21:00 CEST (UTC+2)	Luis Alberto 4'; Felipe Anderson (yellow card) 8', (goal) 15'; Vecino 28', 63'	Report	Giménez 69' (pen.), 88'; Idrissi (yellow card) 78'	Stadium: Stadio Olimpico; Attendance: 22,763; Referee: Ricardo de Burgos Bengoetxea (Spain)

15 September 2022 2	Midtjylland (Denmark)	5–1	(Italy) Lazio	Herning, Denmark
18:45 CEST (UTC+2)	Paulinho 26', (yellow card) 55'; Kaba 30'; Evander 52' (pen.), (penalty missed) 67'; Lössl (yellow card) 61'; Isaksen 67'; Sviatchenko 72'	Report	Milinković-Savić 57'; Romagnoli (yellow card) 70'	Stadium: MCH Arena; Attendance: 9,052; Referee: Nikola Dabanović (Montenegro)

6 October 2022 3	Sturm Graz (Austria)	0–0	(Italy) Lazio	Graz, Austria
18:45 CEST (UTC+2)	Hierländer (yellow card) 34'; Gazibegović (yellow card) 35' (yellow-red card) 82'; Siebenhandl (yellow card) 90'; Kiteishvili (yellow card) 90+3'	Report	Cataldi (yellow card) 25'; Patric (yellow card) 88'	Stadium: Liebenauer Stadium; Attendance: 14,171; Referee: Benoît Bastien (France)

13 October 2022 4	Lazio (Italy)	2–2	(Austria) Sturm Graz	Rome
21:00 CEST (UTC+2)	Lazzari (yellow card) 27' (yellow-red card) 45+2'; Immobile 45' (pen.), (yellow card) 45+3'; Pedro 71'; Milinković-Savić (yellow card) 88'	Report	Ingolitsch (yellow card) 22'; Kiteishvili (yellow card) 27'; Affengruber (yellow card) 44'; Stanković (yellow card) 45+2'; Bøving 56', 83'; Prass (yellow card) 74'; Ljubic (yellow card) 85'	Stadium: Stadio Olimpico; Attendance: 21,059; Referee: Sascha Stegemann (Germany)

27 October 2022 5	Lazio (Italy)	2–1	(Denmark) Midtjylland	Rome
18:45 CEST (UTC+2)	Romagnoli (yellow card) 15'; Milinković-Savić 36'; Pedro 58'; Gila (yellow card) 69'; Vecino (yellow card) 89'	Report	Isaksen 8'; Andersson (yellow card) 42'; Juninho (yellow card) 90'; Sviatchenko (yellow card) 90+5'	Stadium: Stadio Olimpico; Attendance: 17,756; Referee: Daniel Stefański (Poland)

3 November 2022 6	Feyenoord (Netherlands)	1–0	(Italy) Lazio	Rotterdam, Netherlands
18:45 CET (UTC+1)	Giménez 64', (yellow card) 87'; Timber (yellow card) 87'	Report	Lazzari (yellow card) 32'; Zaccagni (yellow card) 52'; Pedro (yellow card) 77'; Cancellieri (yellow card) 79'; Patric (yellow card) 87'; Provedel (yellow card) 87'; Romero (yellow card) 90+5' (yellow-red card) 90+6'	Stadium: De Kuip; Attendance: 43,268; Referee: Irfan Peljto (Bosnia and Herzegovina)

=== UEFA Europa Conference League ===
==== Knockout phase ====
===== Knockout round play-offs =====
The knockout round play-offs draw was held on 7 November 2022.

16 February 2023 First leg	Lazio (Italy)	1–0	(Romania) CFR Cluj	Rome
21:00 CET (UTC+1)	Patric (red card) 15'; Zaccagni (yellow card) 39'; Milinković-Savić (yellow card) 44'; Immobile 45+4'; Hysaj (yellow card) 49'	Report	Boateng (yellow card) 41'; Matias (yellow card) 45+3'; Hoban (yellow card) 79'	Stadium: Stadio Olimpico; Attendance: 11,690; Referee: Craig Pawson (England)

23 February 2023 Second leg	CFR Cluj (Romania)	0–0 (0–1 agg.)	(Italy) Lazio	Cluj-Napoca, Romania
19:45 EET (UTC+2)	Muhar (yellow card) 36' (yellow-red card) 77'; Deac (yellow card) 54'; Cvek (yellow card) 59'	Report	Casale (yellow card) 14'; Immobile (yellow card) 37'	Stadium: Stadionul Dr. Constantin Rădulescu; Attendance: 15,955; Referee: Felix Zwayer (Germany)

===== Round of 16 =====
The round of 16 draw was held on 24 February 2023.

7 March 2023 First leg	Lazio (Italy)	1–2	(Netherlands) AZ	Rome
18:45 CET (UTC+1)	Pedro 18'	Report	Pavlidis 45'; Kerkez 62', (yellow card) 74'; Clasie (yellow card) 72'	Stadium: Stadio Olimpico; Attendance: 19,584; Referee: Glenn Nyberg (Sweden)

16 March 2023 Second leg	AZ (Netherlands)	2–1 (4–2 agg.)	(Italy) Lazio	Alkmaar, Netherlands
21:00 CET (UTC+1)	Kerkez (yellow card) 2'; Karlsson 28'; Pavlidis 62'	Report	Felipe Anderson 21'; Vecino (yellow card) 42'; Pellegrini (yellow card) 47'	Stadium: AFAS Stadion; Attendance: 18,500; Referee: Matej Jug (Slovenia)

== Statistics ==
=== Appearances and goals ===
No.	Pos	Nat	Player	Total		Serie A		Coppa Italia		Europa League		Europa Conference League	
No.	Pos	Nat	Player	Apps	Goals	Apps	Goals	Apps	Goals	Apps	Goals	Apps	Goals
Goalkeepers
1	GK	(Portugal) POR	Luís Maximiano	6	0	1	0	2	0	0	0	3	0
31	GK	(Lithuania) LTU	Marius Adamonis	0	0	0	0	0	0	0	0	0	0
61	GK	(Italy) ITA	Federico Magro	0	0	0	0	0	0	0	0	0	0
94	GK	(Italy) ITA	Ivan Provedel	45	0	37+1	0	0	0	6	0	1	0
Defenders
3	DF	(Italy) ITA	Luca Pellegrini	8	0	1+6	0	0	0	0	0	1	0
4	DF	(Spain) ESP	Patric	26	0	16+2	0	2	0	2+2	0	2	0
13	DF	(Italy) ITA	Alessio Romagnoli	42	2	33+1	2	2	0	4	0	1+1	0
15	DF	(Italy) ITA	Nicolò Casale	37	1	27+2	1	0+2	0	1+1	0	3+1	0
23	DF	(Albania) ALB	Elseid Hysaj	43	1	22+12	1	1	0	6	0	2	0
26	DF	(Romania) ROU	Ștefan Radu	3	0	0+1	0	0	0	1+1	0	0	0
29	DF	(Italy) ITA	Manuel Lazzari	37	0	22+6	0	2	0	2+1	0	3+1	0
34	DF	(Spain) ESP	Mario Gila	12	0	0+4	0	0	0	5	0	2+1	0
44	DF	(Italy) ITA	Romano Floriani	0	0	0	0	0	0	0	0	0	0
77	DF	(Montenegro) MNE	Adam Marušić	44	0	31+2	0	1+1	0	3+3	0	2+1	0
Midfielders
5	MF	(Uruguay) URU	Matías Vecino	44	4	17+15	2	1+1	0	2+4	2	2+2	0
6	MF	(Brazil) BRA	Marcos Antônio	21	1	6+10	1	0+1	0	2+1	0	1	0
10	MF	(Spain) ESP	Luis Alberto	44	7	27+8	6	2	0	4	1	2+1	0
21	MF	(Serbia) SRB	Sergej Milinković-Savić	47	11	34+2	9	1+1	0	3+3	2	3	0
32	MF	(Italy) ITA	Danilo Cataldi	39	0	26+3	0	2	0	4+2	0	1+1	0
50	MF	(Italy) ITA	Marco Bertini	1	0	0+1	0	0	0	0	0	0	0
88	MF	(Croatia) CRO	Toma Bašić	32	1	4+21	1	0+1	0	3+1	0	2	0
96	MF	(Algeria) ALG	Mohamed Farès	0	0	0	0	0	0	0	0	0	0
Forwards
7	FW	(Brazil) BRA	Felipe Anderson	50	12	35+3	9	2	1	5+1	1	4	1
9	FW	(Spain) ESP	Pedro	46	7	18+18	4	1+1	0	3+2	2	1+2	1
11	FW	(Italy) ITA	Matteo Cancellieri	29	0	1+19	0	0	0	2+4	0	1+2	0
17	FW	(Italy) ITA	Ciro Immobile	38	14	27+4	12	1	0	4	1	2	1
18	FW	(Argentina) ARG	Luka Romero	12	1	1+5	1	0+1	0	0+3	0	1+1	0
20	FW	(Italy) ITA	Mattia Zaccagni	45	10	33+2	10	2	0	4+1	0	3	0
Players transferred out during the season
16	DF	(Serbia) SRB	Dimitrije Kamenović	0	0	0	0	0	0	0	0	0	0

Source: Competitions
