= Adrian Przyborek =

Polish footballer (born 2007)

Personal information
- Date of birth: 1 January 2007 (age 19)
- Place of birth: Koszalin, Poland
- Height: 1.84 m (6 ft 0 in)
- Positions: Midfielder; forward

Team information
- Current team: Lazio
- Number: 28

Youth career
- 2012–2016: SAS Sianów
- 2016–2021: Bałtyk Koszalin
- 2021–2022: Pogoń Szczecin

Senior career*
Years	Team	Apps	(Gls)
2022–2024	Pogoń Szczecin II	10	(3)
2023–2026	Pogoń Szczecin	69	(4)
2026–	Lazio	1	(0)

International career^{‡}
2021–2022	Poland U15	7	(2)
2022–2023	Poland U16	6	(1)
2024	Poland U17	3	(0)
2023–2024	Poland U18	9	(2)
2025–2026	Poland U19	9	(0)
- * Club domestic league appearances and goals as of 21:32, 23 May 2026 (UTC) ‡ National team caps and goals as of 19:30, 31 March 2026 (UTC)

Adrian Przyborek (born 1 January 2007) is a Polish professional footballer who plays as a midfielder for Serie A club Lazio.

== Club career ==
=== Early career ===
Born in Koszalin, Przyborek's first introduction to football came as a child, when his grandfather took him to a local football tournament. After telling her that he would "be a great footballer one day", Przyborek's mother Iwona took him to join the Sianów Sports Academy at the age of five. His first coach at Sianów, Piotr Starzecki, advised the academy that he should train with older players, and despite the physical difference, he began to play with teammates three years older than him.

At an indoor football tournament in Rewal, Przyborek played in a match against Bałtyk Koszalin, and following the tournament, a coach from the club invited him to join the club. While at Bałtyk, he was invited to represent both Lech Poznań and Pogoń Szczecin in youth tournaments, and was eventually offered a place in the academy of the latter. Starzecki later revealed that Przyborek's first choice had been Lech Poznań, and that Legia Warsaw had also shown interest.

=== Pogoń Szczecin ===
Having joined Pogoń in 2021, he signed his first professional contract for the club in January of the following year. After featuring for the first team in two friendlies in Autumn 2022, he extended his contract in January 2023.

The following month, he became the second-youngest Pogoń Szczecin player, behind Kacper Kozłowski, when he made his debut aged sixteen against Warta Poznań. Having come on as a second-half substitute for former Poland international Kamil Grosicki, Przyborek was distinguishable on the pitch as his shirt did not have any advertisement, as Pogoń were sponsored by a bookmaker and it is illegal for underage people in Poland to be promoting gambling.

The following season, having established himself in the club's first team, he signed another extension to his contract in March 2024, tying him to the club until July 2027. He scored his first goal for the club the following month in a 5–0 win against Ruch Chorzów, flicking on a corner from Kamil Grosicki into the corner of the goal.

In September 2024, he was recognised by the CIES Football Observatory as one of the most promising young football talents, due to his experience in senior football. A month later, he was named by English newspaper The Guardian as one of the best players born in 2007 worldwide.

=== Lazio ===
On 30 January 2026, Przyborek moved to Italian side Lazio for a reported initial fee of €4.5 million, which could rise to €7 million with add-ons, and Pogoń keeping a 20% sell-on fee.

On 23 May 2026, Przyborek made his Serie A debut for Lazio at Stadio Olimpico against Pisa after being subbed on in the 82nd minute, replacing Fisayo Dele-Bashiru; Lazio eventually won 2–1.

== International career ==
In March 2021, while still with Bałtyk Koszalin, he received his first call up to a Poland national youth training camp.

== Career statistics ==
As of match played 23 May 2026

Appearances and goals by club, season and competition
Club	Season	League			National cup (Note: Includes Polish Cup)		Continental		Other		Total	
Club	Season	Division	Apps	Goals	Apps	Goals	Apps	Goals	Apps	Goals	Apps	Goals
Pogoń Szczecin II	2022–23	III liga, gr. II	5	1	—		—		—		5	1
Pogoń Szczecin II	2023–24	III liga, gr. II	3	2	—		—		—		3	2
Pogoń Szczecin II	2024–25	III liga, gr. II	2	0	—		—		—		2	0
Pogoń Szczecin II	Total		10	3	—		—		—		10	3
Pogoń Szczecin	2022–23	Ekstraklasa	3	0	0	0	—		—		3	0
Pogoń Szczecin	2023–24	Ekstraklasa	22	1	4	0	2 (Note: Appearances in UEFA Europa Conference League)	0	—		28	1
Pogoń Szczecin	2024–25	Ekstraklasa	27	1	6	0	—		—		33	1
Pogoń Szczecin	2025–26	Ekstraklasa	17	2	2	1	—		—		19	3
Pogoń Szczecin	Total		69	4	12	1	2	0	—		83	5
Lazio	2025–26	Serie A	1	0	0	0	—		—		1	0
Career total			80	7	12	1	2	0	0	0	94	8
