= Mattia Zaccagni =

Italian footballer (born 1995)

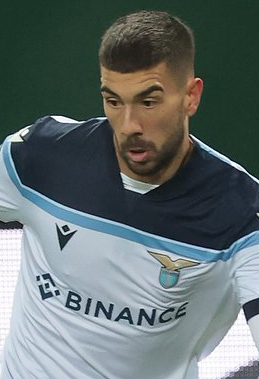
- Zaccagni playing for Lazio in 2021

Personal information
- Date of birth: 16 June 1995 (age 31)
- Place of birth: Cesena, Italy
- Height: 1.76 m (5 ft 9 in)
- Positions: Left winger; attacking midfielder

Team information
- Current team: Lazio
- Number: 10

Youth career
- –2013: Bellaria Igea

Senior career*
| Years | Team | Apps | (Gls) |
| 2012–2014 | Bellaria Igea | 6 | (0) |
| 2013–2014 | → Hellas Verona (loan) | 0 | (0) |
| 2014–2022 | Hellas Verona | 137 | (14) |
| 2014–2015 | → Venezia (loan) | 33 | (1) |
| 2016 | → Cittadella (loan) | 12 | (0) |
| 2021–2022 | → Lazio (loan) | 29 | (4) |
| 2022– | Lazio | 132 | (29) |

International career^{‡}
| 2022–2025 | Italy | 13 | (1) |
- * Club domestic league appearances and goals as of 19:31, 27 October 2026 (UTC) ‡ National team caps and goals as of 16 November 2025

Mattia Zaccagni (Italian pronunciation: [matˈtiːa ddzakˈkaɲɲi]; born 16 June 1995) is an Italian professional footballer who plays as a left winger or attacking midfielder for Serie A club Lazio, whom he captains.

== Club career ==
Zaccagni made his professional debut in the Lega Pro for Venezia on 10 September 2014 in a game against Südtirol.

He made his Serie A debut for Verona on 23 September 2015 as a 75th-minute substitute for Jacopo Sala in a 1–0 loss against Internazionale.

On 31 August 2021, Zaccagni completed a move from Hellas Verona to Lazio on loan with a conditional obligation to buy.

On 17 April 2024, Zaccagni signed a new contract with the Biancocelesti until 30 June 2029 worth €2.8 million per season in addition to bonuses that will take his total salary to figure closer to €3.4 million per year.

Following Ciro Immobile’s move to Besiktas ahead of the 2024-25 season, Zaccagni announced that he had been named as the new Lazio captain: "Being captain is a privilege, but it also means great responsibility. I’ll commit and give my all to the fans, team and club to honour this armband to the fullest."

In February 2025, Zaccagni revealed his idol growing up was former Juventus forward Alessandro Del Piero.

== International career ==
Zaccagni was first called up to the senior Italy squad in November 2020. He debuted in a friendly match against Turkey on 30 March 2022.

In June 2024, Zaccagni was called up to represent Italy at UEFA Euro 2024. In their final group stage match against Croatia, he scored his first international goal with an equaliser in the last minute of stoppage time to secure a 1–1 draw and send his country through to the knockout stage by finishing second in the group. Italy were eliminated from the tournament in the round of 16 following a 2–0 loss to Switzerland.

Zaccagni was once again called up to the Azzurri by Luciano Spalletti in September 2024 for their UEFA Nations League matches against France and Israel; however, he played just four minutes in total. In the following International Break in October 2024, Zaccagni did not receive a call up which sparked some controversy, but it was later revealed that this was due to the fact that he was struggling with a back injury.

== Career statistics ==
=== Club ===
As of match played 27 October 2026

Appearances and goals by club, season and competition
| Club | Season | League | | | National cup (Note: Includes Coppa Italia Serie C, Coppa Italia) | | Europe | | Other | | Total | |
| Club | Season | Division | Apps | Goals | Apps | Goals | Apps | Goals | Apps | Goals | Apps | Goals |
|---|---|---|---|---|---|---|---|---|---|---|---|---|
| Bellaria Igea | 2012–13 | Lega Pro Seconda Divisione | 6 | 0 | 2 | 0 | — | | — | | 8 | 0 |
| Hellas Verona (loan) | 2013–14 | Serie A | 0 | 0 | 0 | 0 | — | | — | | 0 | 0 |
| Venezia (loan) | 2014–15 | Lega Pro | 33 | 1 | 3 | 0 | — | | — | | 36 | 1 |
| Hellas Verona | 2015–16 | Serie A | 3 | 0 | 1 | 0 | — | | — | | 4 | 0 |
| Hellas Verona | 2016–17 | Serie B | 26 | 2 | 1 | 0 | — | | — | | 27 | 2 |
| Hellas Verona | 2017–18 | Serie A | 6 | 0 | 1 | 0 | — | | — | | 7 | 0 |
| Hellas Verona | 2018–19 | Serie B | 30 | 3 | 2 | 0 | — | | 2 (Note: Appearances in Serie B promotion play-offs) | 1 | 34 | 4 |
| Hellas Verona | 2019–20 | Serie A | 34 | 2 | 1 | 0 | — | | — | | 35 | 2 |
| Hellas Verona | 2020–21 | Serie A | 36 | 5 | 1 | 0 | — | | — | | 37 | 5 |
| Hellas Verona | 2021–22 | Serie A | 2 | 2 | 1 | 0 | — | | — | | 3 | 2 |
| Hellas Verona | Total | | 137 | 14 | 8 | 0 | — | | 2 | 1 | 147 | 15 |
| Cittadella (loan) | 2015–16 | Lega Pro | 12 | 0 | 0 | 0 | — | | 2 (Note: Appearances in Supercoppa di Lega Pro) | 1 | 14 | 1 |
| Lazio (loan) | 2021–22 | Serie A | 29 | 4 | 2 | 0 | 5 (Note: Appearances in UEFA Europa League) | 1 | — | | 36 | 5 |
| Lazio | 2022–23 | Serie A | 35 | 10 | 2 | 0 | 8 (Note: Five appearances in UEFA Europa League, three appearances in UEFA Europa Conference League) | 0 | — | | 45 | 10 |
| Lazio | 2023–24 | Serie A | 28 | 6 | 2 | 1 | 6 (Note: Appearances in UEFA Champions League) | 0 | 0 | 0 | 36 | 7 |
| Lazio | 2024–25 | Serie A | 34 | 8 | 2 | 0 | 10 | 2 | — | | 46 | 10 |
| Lazio | 2025–26 | Serie A | 26 | 3 | 4 | 1 | — | | — | | 30 | 4 |
| Lazio | 2026–27 | Serie A | 9 | 2 | 1 | 0 | — | | 0 | 0 | 10 | 2 |
| Lazio | Lazio total | | 161 | 33 | 13 | 2 | 29 | 3 | 0 | 0 | 203 | 38 |
| Career total | | | 349 | 48 | 26 | 2 | 29 | 3 | 4 | 2 | 408 | 55 |

=== International ===
As of match played 16 November 2025

Appearances and goals by national team and year
| National team | Year | Apps | Goals |
|---|---|---|---|
| Italy | 2022 | 1 | 0 |
| Italy | 2023 | 2 | 0 |
| Italy | 2024 | 6 | 1 |
| Italy | 2025 | 4 | 0 |
| Total | | 13 | 1 |

Scores and results list Italy's goal tally first.

List of international goals scored by Mattia Zaccagni
| No. | Date | Venue | Cap | Opponent | Score | Result | Competition |
|---|---|---|---|---|---|---|---|
| 1 | 24 June 2024 | Red Bull Arena, Leipzig, Germany | 7 | Croatia | 1–1 | 1–1 | UEFA Euro 2024 |

== Honours ==
Citadella

- Lega Pro: 2015–16
- Coppa Italia Serie C runner-up: 2015–16

Lazio

- Coppa Italia runner-up: 2025–26

Individual

- Serie A Goal of the Year: 2021
- Serie A Team of the Season: 2024–25
