= Manuel Lazzari =

Italian footballer (born 1993)

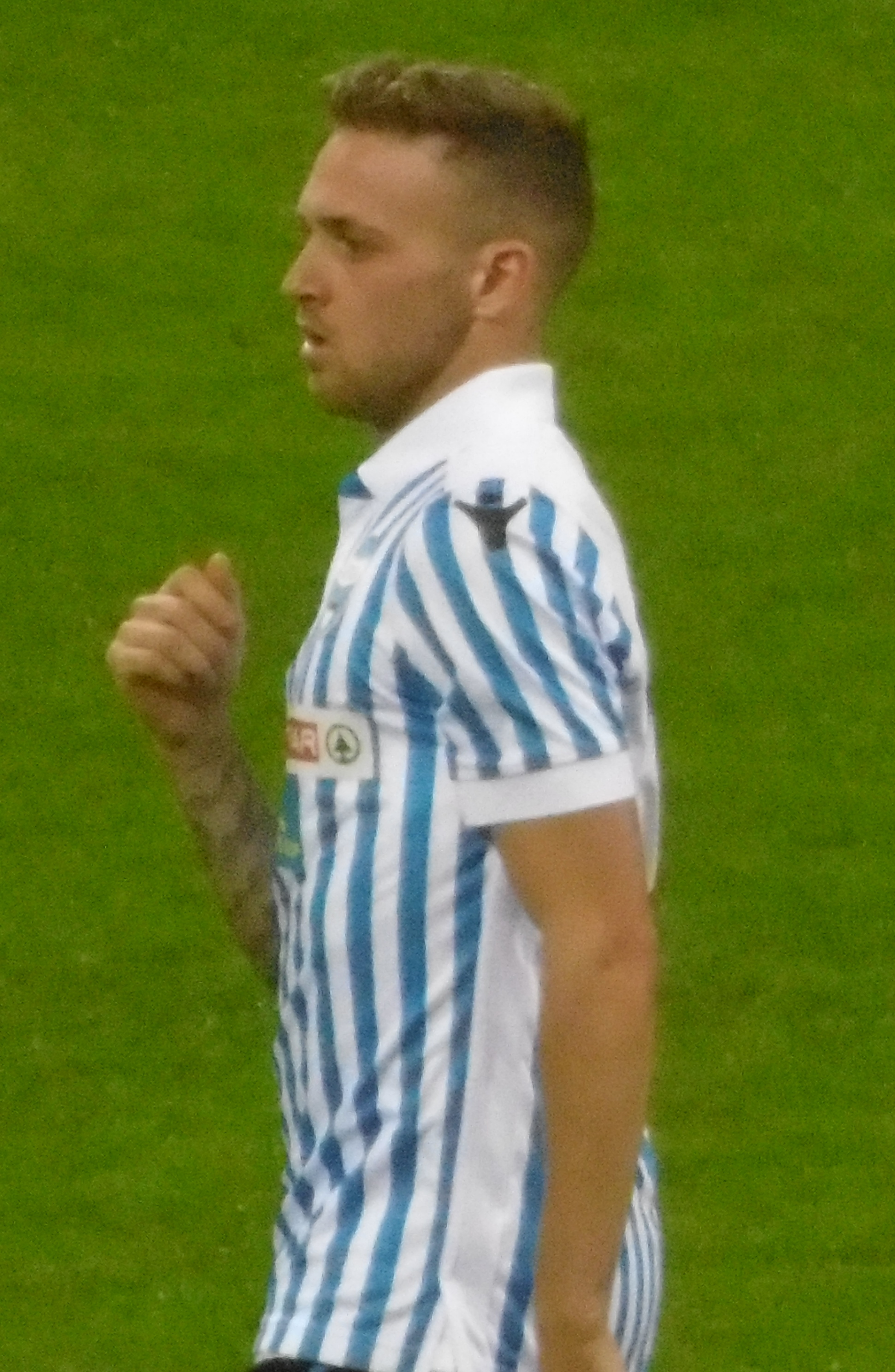
- Lazzari playing for SPAL in 2017

Personal information
- Full name: Manuel Lazzari
- Date of birth: 29 November 1993 (age 32)
- Place of birth: Valdagno, Italy
- Height: 1.74 m (5 ft 9 in)
- Positions: Right midfielder; right-back

Team information
- Current team: Lazio
- Number: 29

Youth career
- –2006: Trissino
- 2006–2010: Vicenza

Senior career*
Years	Team	Apps	(Gls)
2010–2011	Montecchio Maggiore	29	(1)
2011–2012	Delta Porto Tolle	33	(3)
2012–2013	Giacomense	24	(0)
2013–2019	SPAL	198	(3)
2019–	Lazio	195	(5)

International career
2018–2022	Italy	3	(0)
Medal record
Men's Football
CONMEBOL–UEFA Cup of Champions
Runner-up	2022 England
- * Club domestic league appearances and goals as of 23 May 2026

Manuel Lazzari (Italian pronunciation: [ˈmaːnwel ˈladdzari]; born 29 November 1993) is an Italian professional footballer who plays as a right midfielder or right-back for Serie A club Lazio.

== Club career ==
=== SPAL ===
Following the merger with Giacomense, Lazzari joined SPAL. Lazzari made his professional debut in the Lega Pro for SPAL on 31 August 2014, in a game against Pontedera. He helped them to two successive promotions from Lega Pro to Serie A.

On 20 August 2017, he made his debut in the Serie A in a draw against Lazio. A week later, in the 3–2 win against Udinese, he scored his first Serie A goal. On 29 April 2018, during a match against Hellas Verona, Lazzari was injured in the medial collateral. He returned to the field on the last day of the championship, in which SPAL avoided relegation by beating Sampdoria 3–1.

During the following season, he became a permanent feature in Leonardo Semplici's starting eleven. He helped SPAL avoid relegation once again, also contributing to a record-eight assists.

=== Lazio ===
On 12 July 2019, Lazzari moved to Lazio, in a deal worth €10m and Alessandro Murgia moving the other way.

Lazzari won his first trophy with Lazio on 22 December 2019, playing the full game in their 3–1 victory over Juventus in the 2019 Supercoppa Italiana, held at the King Saud University Stadium in Riyadh, Saudi Arabia.

== International career ==
Lazzari was given his first senior international call-up for Italy in September 2018, by manager Roberto Mancini, for Italy's opening UEFA Nations League matches against Poland and Portugal later that month. On 10 September, Lazzari made his debut for Italy in the 1–0 away loss to Portugal.

== Career statistics ==
=== Club ===
As of match played 23 May 2026

Appearances and goals by club, season and competition
Club	Season	League			Cup (Note: Includes Coppa Lega Pro and Coppa Italia)		Europe		Other		Total	
Club	Season	Division	Apps	Goals	Apps	Goals	Apps	Goals	Apps	Goals	Apps	Goals
Montecchio Maggiore	2010–11	Serie D	29	1	—		—		—		29	1
Delta Rovigo	2011–12	Serie D	33	3	—		—		2 (Note: Appearances in Serie D promotion play-offs)	0	35	3
Giacomense	2012–13	Lega Pro 2D	24	0	0	0	—		—		24	0
SPAL	2013–14	Lega Pro 2D	30	0	3	0	—		—		33	0
SPAL	2014–15	Lega Pro	29	0	5	0	—		—		34	0
SPAL	2015–16	Lega Pro	31	1	2	0	—		2 (Note: Appearances in Supercoppa di Lega Pro)	1	35	2
SPAL	2016–17	Serie B	39	0	2	0	—		—		41	0
SPAL	2017–18	Serie A	36	2	2	0	—		—		38	2
SPAL	2018–19	Serie A	33	0	1	0	—		—		34	0
SPAL	Total		198	3	15	0	0	0	2	1	215	4
Lazio	2019–20	Serie A	32	0	1	0	6 (Note: Appearances in UEFA Europa League)	1	1 (Note: Appearance in Supercoppa Italiana)	0	40	1
Lazio	2020–21	Serie A	32	2	2	0	5 (Note: Appearances in UEFA Champions League)	0	—		39	2
Lazio	2021–22	Serie A	31	3	2	0	6	0	—		39	3
Lazio	2022–23	Serie A	28	0	2	0	7 (Note: Three appearances in UEFA Europa League, four appearances in UEFA Europa Conference League)	0	—		37	0
Lazio	2023–24	Serie A	24	0	1	0	7	0	1	0	33	0
Lazio	2024–25	Serie A	25	0	2	0	7	0	—		34	0
Lazio	2025–26	Serie A	23	0	2	0	—		—		25	0
Lazio	Total		195	5	12	0	38	1	2	0	247	6
Career total			481	12	27	0	38	1	4	1	550	14

=== International ===
As of match played 1 June 2022

National team	Year	Apps	Goals
Italy
Italy	2018	1	0
Italy	2019	0	0
Italy	2020	1	0
Italy	2021	0	0
Italy	2022	1	0
Italy	2023	0	0
Total		3	0

== Honours ==
SPAL

- Serie B: 2016–17
- Lega Pro: 2015–16
- Supercoppa di Lega Pro: 2016

Lazio

- Supercoppa Italiana: 2019
- Coppa Italia runner-up: 2025–26
