= Matteo Cancellieri =

Italian footballer (born 2002)

Personal information
- Date of birth: 12 February 2002 (age 24)
- Place of birth: Rome, Italy
- Height: 1.84 m (6 ft 0 in)
- Position: Winger

Team information
- Current team: Lazio
- Number: 22

Youth career
- 2018–2020: Roma
- 2020–2021: → Hellas Verona (loan)

Senior career*
Years	Team	Apps	(Gls)
2021–2023	Hellas Verona	12	(1)
2022–2023	→ Lazio (loan)	20	(0)
2023–	Lazio	34	(5)
2023–2024	→ Empoli (loan)	36	(4)
2024–2025	→ Parma (loan)	27	(3)

International career^{‡}
2018	Italy U17	1	(0)
2021–	Italy U21	12	(4)
2022	Italy	1	(0)
- * Club domestic league appearances and goals as of 06:09, 13 September 2026 (UTC) ‡ National team caps and goals as of 28 June 2023

Matteo Cancellieri (born 12 February 2002) is an Italian professional footballer who plays as a winger or second striker for Serie A club Lazio.

== Club career ==
=== Early career in Rome ===
Cancellieri arrived in the AS Roma academy at the age of nine from Polisportiva De Rossi in the Appio-Latino, soon becoming a prolific goalscorer with the Giallorossi's youth setup.

On 13 March 2018, Cancellieri first rose to fame during the Champions League game against Shakhtar Donetsk, where he was a ball boy at the Stadio Olimpico. He was pushed by the Shakhtar player Facundo Ferreyra, who made him fall beyond an advertising board. Roma eventually won the game, qualifying for the quarter-finals, where they would beat FC Barcelona in a famous remontada, under the management of coach Di Francesco.

=== Verona ===
In 2020, Cancellieri joined Hellas Verona on a two years loan, with an obligation of purchase, along with his teammates Mert Çetin and Aboudramane Diaby, as Marash Kumbulla made the move in the opposite direction to join Rome.

Cancellieri played his first season with the club in the Campionato Primavera 2, still impressing with his goal tally, as he scored 15 goals and delivered 7 assists in only 18 games.

He made his professional debut for Verona under manager Eusebio Di Francesco on 14 August 2021, starting the Coppa Italia game against Catanzaro, proving to be instrumental in his team 3–0 home win. Cancellieri made his Serie A debut only one week later against Sassuolo, coming on as a substitute, before starting his first Serie A game six days later, against Inter Milan, the reigning champions.

==== Loan moves ====
On 30 June 2022, Cancellieri moved on loan to Lazio with an obligation to buy his rights if certain conditions are met.

On 16 August 2023, Cancellieri joined Empoli on a one-year loan. Later that year, on 2 December, he scored his first goal in a 1–1 away draw against Genoa, one minute after entering the pitch. On the final matchday of the 2023–24 season, he scored a goal and provided an assist in a 2–1 victory over Roma, securing Empoli's survival in the top tier.

On 14 August 2024, Cancellieri was loaned to Parma on a one-year deal with an option to buy.

== International career ==
Whilst being an international with Italy's under-17 in 2018, Cancellieri received his first call-up to the under-21 team in August 2021. He made his debut on 3 September during the European Championship qualifying, starting the home match against Luxembourg.

Cancellieri was selected for Italy squad for the 2022 Finalissima against Argentina on 1 June 2022, as well as 2022–23 UEFA Nations League group stage matches against Germany, Hungary, England and Germany between 4 and 14 June. During the latter competition on 4 June, he debuted in a 1–1 draw against Germany as a substitute to Gianluca Scamacca in the 85th minute.

== Personal life ==
Cancellieri was born in Italy to an Italian father and Cuban mother.

== Career statistics ==
=== Club ===
As of match played 12 September 2026

Appearances and goals by club, season and competition
Club	Season	League			Coppa Italia		Europe		Total	
Club	Season	Division	Apps	Goals	Apps	Goals	Apps	Goals	Apps	Goals
Hellas Verona	2021–22	Serie A	12	1	2	1	—		14	2
Lazio (loan)	2022–23	Serie A	20	0	—		10 (Note: Six appearances in UEFA Europa League, four appearances in UEFA Europa Conference League)	0	30	0
Lazio	2025–26	Serie A	30	4	5	0	—		35	4
Lazio	2026–27	Serie A	4	1	1	0	—		5	1
Lazio	Lazio total		54	5	6	0	10	0	70	5
Empoli (loan)	2023–24	Serie A	36	4	—		—		36	4
Parma (loan)	2024–25	Serie A	27	3	—		—		27	3
Career total			129	13	8	1	10	0	147	14
