= Ivan Provedel =

Italian footballer (born 1994)

Personal information
- Date of birth: 17 March 1994 (age 32)
- Place of birth: Pordenone, Italy
- Height: 1.94 m (6 ft 4 in)
- Position: Goalkeeper

Team information
- Current team: Inter Milan
- Number: 49

Youth career
- 2006–2008: Treviso
- 2008–2009: Pordenone
- 2009–2010: Liapiave
- 2010–2012: Udinese
- 2012–2013: Chievo

Senior career*
Years	Team	Apps	(Gls)
2013–2017	Chievo	0	(0)
2013–2014	→ Pisa (loan)	26	(0)
2014–2015	→ Perugia (loan)	24	(0)
2015–2016	→ Modena (loan)	21	(0)
2016–2017	→ Pro Vercelli (loan)	40	(0)
2017–2020	Empoli	39	(0)
2020	→ Juve Stabia (loan)	18	(1)
2020–2022	Spezia	60	(0)
2022–2026	Lazio	124	(0)
2026–	Inter Milan	2	(0)

International career^{‡}
2013–2015	Italy U20	5	(0)
- * Club domestic league appearances and goals as of 19:48, 28 October 2026 (UTC) ‡ National team caps and goals as of 25 February 2015

Ivan Provedel (born 17 March 1994) is an Italian professional footballer who plays as a goalkeeper for Serie A club Inter Milan.

== Club career ==
Born in Pordenone, Provedel began his youth career with Udinese in 2011 before moving to Chievo in 2012, with whom he made his professional debut in 2013.

During the 2013–14 season, he played on loan for Pisa in Lega Pro Prima Divisione. The following season, he played on loan for Perugia in Serie B. He made his Serie B debut on 29 August 2014 against Bologna in a 2–1 home win. In the summer of 2017, Provedel completed a transfer to Empoli for €1.2 million.

On 22 January 2020, Provedel joined Juve Stabia on loan. On 7 February 2020, he scored the first goal of his career: a late equalizer in a 2–2 draw to Ascoli. On 5 October 2020, Provedel signed a two-year contract with Spezia.

On 8 August 2022, Provedel moved to Lazio.

On 19 September 2023, Provedel scored a header for Lazio in their first group stage match of the 2023–24 UEFA Champions League, a 90+5 minute equalizer to draw 1–1 at home against Atlético Madrid. This was the second goal of his career and the second open-play goal scored by a goalkeeper in the UEFA Champions League, after Sinan Bolat's goal for Standard Liège in 2009 against AZ Alkmaar.

On 8 July 2026, Provedel joined fellow Serie A club Inter Milan, signing a three-year contract.

== International career ==
On 17 September 2022, Provedel received his first Italy national team call-up, as manager Roberto Mancini named him to be part of the squad for the UEFA Nations League games against England and Hungary.

== Personal life ==
Provedel was born in Pordenone to an Italian father and a Russian mother. He is the youngest of six siblings.

== Career statistics ==
As of match played 28 October 2026

Appearances and goals by club, season and competition
Club	Season	League			Coppa Italia		Europe		Other		Total	
Club	Season	Division	Apps	Goals	Apps	Goals	Apps	Goals	Apps	Goals	Apps	Goals
Pisa (loan)	2013–14	Lega Pro Prima Divisione	26	0	1	0	—		3 (Note: Appearances in Lega Pro Prima Divisione promotion play-offs)	0	30	0
Perugia (loan)	2014–15	Serie B	24	0	1	0	—		—		25	0
Modena (loan)	2015–16	Serie B	21	0	0	0	—		—		21	0
Pro Vercelli (loan)	2016–17	Serie B	40	0	1	0	—		—		41	0
Empoli	2017–18	Serie B	23	0	1	0	—		—		24	0
Empoli	2018–19	Serie A	16	0	0	0	—		—		16	0
Empoli	2019–20	Serie B	0	0	1	0	—		—		1	0
Empoli	2020–21	Serie B	0	0	1	0	—		—		1	0
Empoli	Total		39	0	3	0	—		—		42	0
Juve Stabia (loan)	2019–20	Serie B	18	1	—		—		—		18	1
Spezia	2020–21	Serie A	29	0	0	0	—		—		29	0
Spezia	2021–22	Serie A	31	0	0	0	—		—		31	0
Spezia	Total		60	0	0	0	—		—		60	0
Lazio	2022–23	Serie A	38	0	0	0	7 (Note: Six appearances in UEFA Europa League, one appearance in UEFA Europa Conference League)	0	—		45	0
Lazio	2023–24	Serie A	30	0	1	0	8 (Note: Appearances in UEFA Champions League)	1	1 (Note: Appearance in Supercoppa Italiana)	0	40	1
Lazio	2024–25	Serie A	29	0	0	0	3 (Note: Appearances in UEFA Europa League)	0	—		32	0
Lazio	2025–26	Serie A	27	0	2	0	—		—		29	0
Lazio	Total		124	0	3	0	18	1	1	0	146	1
Inter Milan	2026–27	Serie A	2	0	0	0	0	0	0	0	2	0
Career total			354	1	9	0	18	1	4	0	385	2

== Honours ==
Empoli

- Serie B: 2017–18

Individual

- Serie A Best Goalkeeper: 2022–23

== See also ==
- List of goalscoring goalkeepers
