= Danilo Cataldi =

Italian footballer (born 1994)

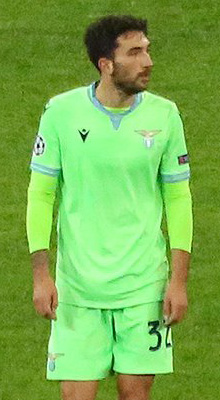
- Cataldi with Lazio in 2020

Personal information
- Date of birth: 6 August 1994 (age 32)
- Place of birth: Rome, Italy
- Height: 1.80 m (5 ft 11 in)
- Positions: Central midfielder; defensive midfielder

Team information
- Current team: Lazio
- Number: 32

Youth career
- 1999–2006: Ottavia
- 2006–2013: Lazio

Senior career*
Years	Team	Apps	(Gls)
2013–	Lazio	215	(10)
2013–2014	→ Crotone (loan)	35	(4)
2017	→ Genoa (loan)	13	(0)
2017–2018	→ Benevento (loan)	29	(1)
2024–2025	→ Fiorentina (loan)	25	(3)

International career
2012	Italy U18	3	(0)
2012–2013	Italy U19	6	(1)
2013	Italy U20	2	(1)
2014–2017	Italy U21	20	(2)
- * Club domestic league appearances and goals as of 23:11, 18 April 2026 (UTC)

Danilo Cataldi (born 6 August 1994) is an Italian professional footballer who plays as a central or defensive midfielder for Serie A club Lazio.

== Club career ==
Cataldi was born in Rome to parents from Missanello, Southern Italy. A product of Lazio's youth system, he was sent on loan to Serie B club Crotone in the 2013–2014 season, where he played as a starter, obtaining 35 appearances and scoring 4 goals.

He made his return in Lazio's first team for the 2014–15 season, making his Serie A debut on 18 January 2015, in the match lost 1–0 against Napoli at Stadio Olimpico. He scored his first goal for the club on 21 August 2016 in a 4–3 away win over Atalanta.

Cataldi was loaned out to Genoa on 13 January 2017 until 30 June 2017.

On 19 July 2017, Cataldi was loaned out to newly promoted Serie A club Benevento.

On 30 August 2024, Cataldi was loaned by Fiorentina, with an option to buy.

On 1 December 2024, Cataldi was praised for his efforts in helping teammate Edoardo Bove after Bove collapsed on the pitch, during a Serie A fixture between Fiorentina and Inter Milan.

== International career ==
On 5 March 2014, Cataldi made his debut with the Italy U-21 side in a qualification match against Northern Ireland.

With the Italy U-21 he took part at the 2015 UEFA European Under-21 Championship.

On 5 November 2016, Cataldi was called up to the senior Italian international squad for the first time for 2018 FIFA World Cup Qualification match against Liechtenstein and friendly against Germany.

In June 2017, he was included in the Italy under-21 squad for the 2017 UEFA European Under-21 Championship by manager Luigi Di Biagio. He made his only appearance of the tournament In Italy's second group match on 21 June, a 3–1 defeat to Czech Republic. Italy were eliminated in the semi-finals following a 3–1 defeat to Spain on 27 June.

== Career statistics ==
=== Club ===
As of match played 22 April 2026

Appearances and goals by club, season and competition
Club	Season	League			Coppa Italia		Europe		Other		Total	
Club	Season	Division	Apps	Goals	Apps	Goals	Apps	Goals	Apps	Goals	Apps	Goals
Lazio	2014–15	Serie A	16	0	5	0	—		—		21	0
Lazio	2015–16	Serie A	20	1	1	1	5 (Note: Appearances in UEFA Europa League)	0	1 (Note: Appearance in Supercoppa Italiana)	0	27	2
Lazio	2016–17	Serie A	11	1	—		—		—		11	1
Lazio	2018–19	Serie A	12	2	0	0	6	0	—		18	2
Lazio	2019–20	Serie A	21	1	1	0	5	0	1	1	28	2
Lazio	2020–21	Serie A	19	0	0	0	4 (Note: Appearances in UEFA Champions League)	0	—		23	0
Lazio	2021–22	Serie A	32	1	2	0	8	1	—		42	2
Lazio	2022–23	Serie A	29	0	2	0	8 (Note: Six appearances in UEFA Europa League, two appearances in UEFA Europa Conference League)	0	—		39	0
Lazio	2023–24	Serie A	28	1	3	0	5	0	1	0	37	1
Lazio	2025–26	Serie A	27	3	3	0	—		—		30	3
Lazio	Total		215	10	17	1	41	1	3	1	276	13
Crotone (loan)	2013–14	Serie B	35	4	2	0	—		1 (Note: Appearance in Serie B promotion play-offs)	0	38	4
Genoa (loan)	2016–17	Serie A	13	0	0	0	—		—		13	0
Benevento (loan)	2017–18	Serie A	29	1	1	0	—		—		30	1
Fiorentina (loan)	2024–25	Serie A	25	3	1	0	7 (Note: Appearances in UEFA Conference League)	0	—		33	3
Career total			317	19	21	1	48	1	4	1	388	22

== Honours ==
Lazio

- Coppa Italia: 2018–19
- Supercoppa Italiana: 2019
