= Toma Bašić =

Croatian footballer (born 1996)

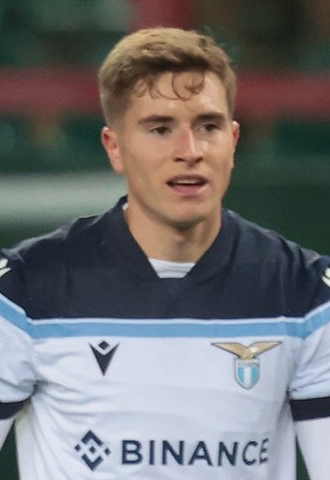
- Bašić with Lazio in 2021

Personal information
- Date of birth: 25 November 1996 (age 29)
- Place of birth: Zagreb, Croatia
- Height: 1.90 m (6 ft 3 in)
- Position: Midfielder

Team information
- Current team: Venezia
- Number: 26

Youth career
- 2005–2007: Dubrava
- 2007–2014: Zagreb

Senior career*
Years	Team	Apps	(Gls)
2014–2018	Hajduk Split	60	(9)
2014–2015	→ Rudeš (loan)	25	(2)
2018–2021	Bordeaux	75	(7)
2021–2026	Lazio	77	(3)
2024	→ Salernitana (loan)	15	(0)
2026–	Venezia	8	(1)

International career^{‡}
2014–2015	Croatia U19	8	(0)
2017–2019	Croatia U21	8	(2)
2020	Croatia	2	(0)
- * Club domestic league appearances and goals as of 08:27, 7 November 2026 (UTC) ‡ National team caps and goals as of 17 November 2020

Toma Bašić (Croatian pronunciation: [tôma bâʃitɕ]; born 25 November 1996) is a Croatian professional footballer who plays as a midfielder for Serie A club Venezia.

== Club career ==
=== Early career ===
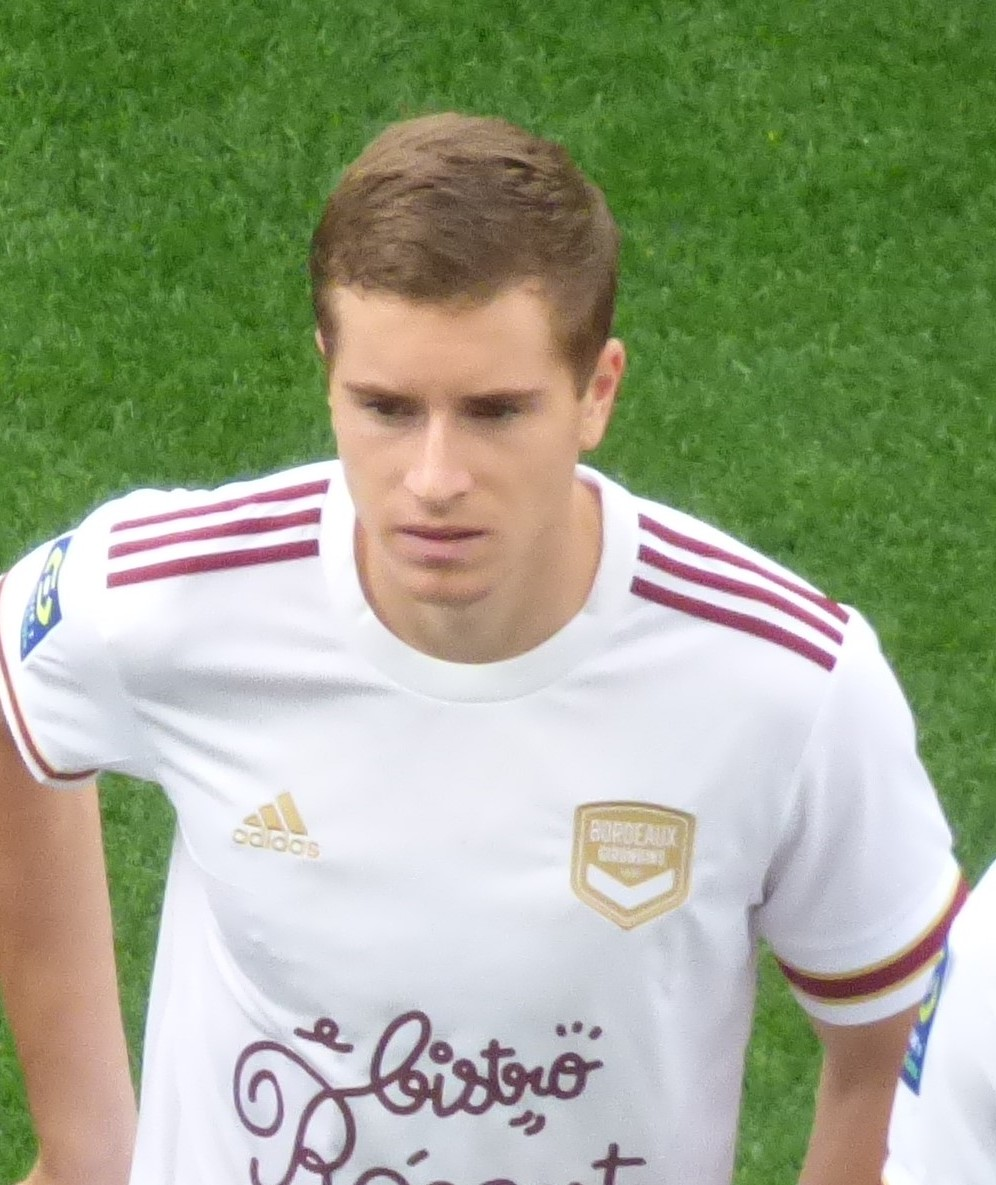
Bašić with Bordeaux in 2020

Bašić went through the ranks of NK Zagreb before signing for Hajduk Split in 2014, the same generation as Fran Tudor. However, he remained in Zagreb, having been immediately sent on loan to the Druga HNL club Rudeš for the remainder of the season. The beginning of the 2015–16 season saw him playing for Hajduk Split, balancing between the main and reserve squads. Bašić made his first team league debut on 10 August 2015 in a 1–2 away victory against Lokomotiva, coming in for Andrija Balić in the 84th minute.

In August 2018, Bašić joined Ligue 1 club Bordeaux for €3.5 million on a four-year contract. He debuted on 12 August in a 2–0 home defeat against Strasbourg, coming on in 72nd minute for Aurélien Tchouaméni. On 19 December, he scored his first goal for the club in a Coupe de la Ligue match against Dijon that ended in a 1–0 victory.

=== Italy ===
On 25 August 2021, Bašić signed for Serie A club Lazio. He made his debut on 12 September in a 2–0 defeat against Milan, coming on in 74th minute for Sergej Milinković-Savić. He scored his debut goal on 30 September in a Europa League 2–0 victory against Lokomotiv Moscow.

On 17 January 2024, Bašić moved on loan to Salernitana until the end of the season.

Basić joined Serie A newcomers Venezia as a free agent on 27 May 2026.

== International career ==
Bašić was selected to Nenad Gračan's 23-man squad for UEFA Under-21 Euro 2019, remaining an unused substitute throughout the tournament as Croatia finished last in their group.

On 4 November 2020, Bašić received his first call-up to the Croatian senior team by head coach Zlatko Dalić for matches that same month against Turkey, Sweden, and Portugal. Bašić debuted on 11 November, playing the last 30 minutes in a friendly 3–3 draw against the former opponent, in which he broke the ball.

On 17 May 2021, Bašić was included in Dalić's preliminary 34-man squad for the UEFA Euro 2020; however, he did not make the final 26.

== Personal life ==
Bašić was born and raised in the Dubrava neighborhood of Zagreb, and was a fan of Hajduk Split through his father, who is originally from Pirovac in Dalmatia. He has a twin brother Jakov, who is also a footballer.

== Career statistics ==
=== Club ===
As of match played 6 November 2026

Appearances and goals by club, season and competition
Club	Season	League			National cup (Note: Includes Croatian Cup, Coupe de France and Coppa Italia)		League cup (Note: Includes Coupe de la Ligue)		Continental		Total	
Club	Season	Division	Apps	Goals	Apps	Goals	Apps	Goals	Apps	Goals	Apps	Goals
Rudeš (loan)	2014–15	Druga HNL	25	2	—		—		—		25	2
Hajduk Split	2015–16	Prva HNL	4	1	1	0	—		0	0	5	1
Hajduk Split	2016–17	Prva HNL	28	5	3	1	—		5 (Note: Appearances in UEFA Europa League)	0	36	6
Hajduk Split	2017–18	Prva HNL	27	3	3	1	—		1	0	31	4
Hajduk Split	2018–19	Prva HNL	1	0	—		—		2	0	3	0
Hajduk Split	Total		60	9	7	2	—		8	0	75	11
Bordeaux	2018–19	Ligue 1	23	2	1	0	3	1	0	0	27	3
Bordeaux	2019–20	Ligue 1	15	1	2	1	1	0	—		18	2
Bordeaux	2020–21	Ligue 1	34	4	0	0	—		—		34	4
Bordeaux	2021–22	Ligue 1	3	0	0	0	—		—		3	0
Bordeaux	Total		75	7	3	1	4	1	0	0	82	9
Lazio	2021–22	Serie A	29	0	1	0	—		7	1	37	1
Lazio	2022–23	Serie A	25	1	1	0	—		6 (Note: Four appearances in UEFA Europa League, two appearances in UEFA Europa Conference League)	0	33	1
Lazio	2023–24	Serie A	0	0	1	0	—		0	0	1	0
Lazio	2024–25	Serie A	0	0	0	0	—		0	0	0	0
Lazio	2025–26	Serie A	23	2	3	0	—		—		26	2
Lazio	Total		77	3	6	0	—		13	1	96	4
Salernitana (loan)	2023–24	Serie A	15	0	—		—		—		15	0
Venezia	2026–27	Serie A	8	1	0	0	—		—		8	1
Career total			260	22	16	3	4	1	21	1	301	27

=== International ===
As of match played 17 November 2020

Appearances and goals by national team and year
National team	Year	Apps	Goals
Croatia	2020	2	0
Total		2	0
