= Adam Marušić =

Montenegrin footballer (born 1992)

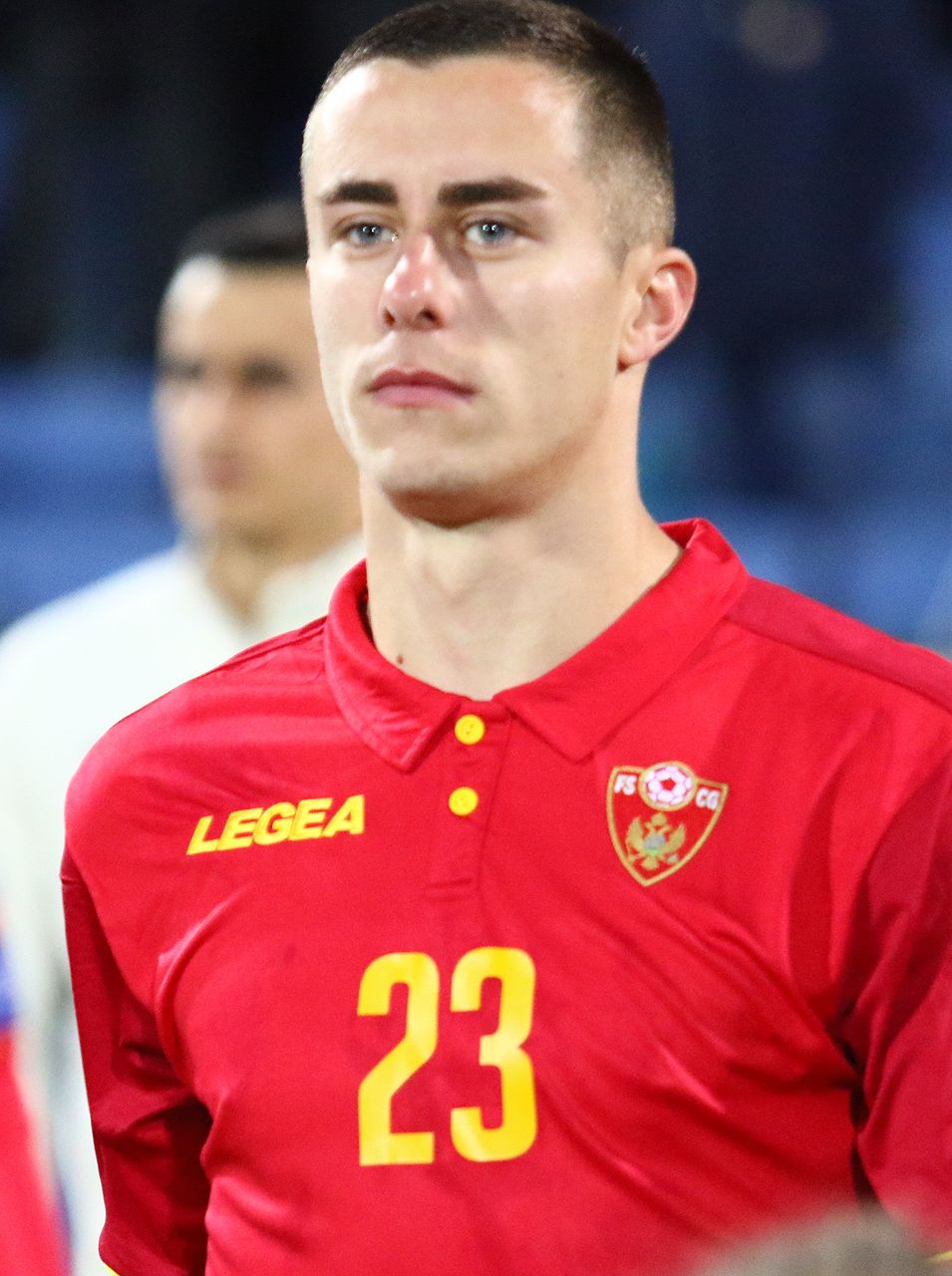
- Marušić playing for Montenegro in 2019

Personal information
- Full name: Adam Marušić
- Date of birth: 17 October 1992 (age 34)
- Place of birth: Belgrade, FR Yugoslavia
- Height: 1.85 m (6 ft 1 in)
- Position: Right-back

Team information
- Current team: Lazio
- Number: 77

Youth career
- Teleoptik
- Voždovac

Senior career*
Years	Team	Apps	(Gls)
2010–2014	Voždovac	89	(15)
2014–2016	Kortrijk	71	(10)
2016–2017	Oostende	35	(5)
2017–	Lazio	281	(15)

International career^{‡}
2015–	Montenegro	70	(5)
- * Club domestic league appearances and goals as of 23:50, 24 August 2026 (UTC) ‡ National team caps and goals as of 23:18, 5 June 2026 (UTC)

Adam Marušić (Serbian Cyrillic: Адам Марушић, pronounced [ǎdam mǎruʃitɕ]; born 17 October 1992) is a Montenegrin professional footballer who plays as a right-back for Serie A club Lazio and the Montenegro national team.

== Club career ==
=== Voždovac ===
Marušić made his senior debut with Voždovac in the third tier of the Serbian football pyramid. After two seasons in Voždovac, he made his debut in the SuperLiga. In the 2013–14 season, Marušić scored six goals and recorded three assists.

=== Kortrijk ===
On 18 June 2014, Marušić joined K.V. Kortrijk on a three-year contract, with his transfer costing €450,000. By the fall of 2014, he had already become a regular in Kortrijk's starting eleven. On 1 November 2014, Marušić scored two goals in Kortrijk's 4–0 win against Cercle Brugge.

=== Oostende ===
On 27 June 2016, Marušić signed a four-year contract with K.V. Oostende, with his transfer costing €900,000.

=== Lazio ===
On 1 July 2017, Marušić was signed on a five-year contract by Lazio. He scored his first goal for the club on 24 September, in a 3–0 away win over Hellas Verona.

In Lazio's financial report ending 31 December 2021, it was confirmed that Marušić had extended his contract with the club until 2024. In October 2022, it was revealed that Marušić signed an additional one-year contract extension, tying him to the club until 2025.

On 10 March 2025, Marušić made his 300th appearance for the club in their 1-1 draw against Udinese.

== International career ==
Although Marušić was born in Belgrade, he accepted an invitation to play for the Montenegro national team. He made his debut for Montenegro on 27 March 2015, in a match against Russia which was suspended after Russian goalkeeper Igor Akinfeev was struck in the head by a flare.

On 1 September 2021, Marušić scored his first international goal in a 2022 FIFA World Cup qualifying draw against Turkey.

== Career statistics ==
=== Club ===
As of match played 24 August 2026

Appearances and goals by club, season and competition
Club	Season	League			National cup (Note: Includes Serbian Cup, Belgian Cup, Coppa Italia)		Europe		Other		Total	
Club	Season	Division	Apps	Goals	Apps	Goals	Apps	Goals	Apps	Goals	Apps	Goals
Voždovac	2010–11	Serbian League Belgrade	11	2	—		—		—		11	2
Voždovac	2011–12	Serbian League Belgrade	26	6	—		—		—		26	6
Voždovac	2012–13	Serbian First League	25	1	—		—		—		25	1
Voždovac	2013–14	Serbian SuperLiga	27	6	1	0	—		—		28	6
Voždovac	Total		89	15	1	0	—		—		90	15
Kortrijk	2014–15	Belgian Pro League	34	6	1	0	—		—		35	6
Kortrijk	2015–16	Belgian Pro League	37	4	2	1	—		—		39	5
Kortrijk	Total		71	10	3	1	—		—		74	11
Oostende	2016–17	Belgian Pro League	35	5	4	0	—		1 (Note: Appearance in Belgian Pro League Europa League play-offs)	0	40	5
Lazio	2017–18	Serie A	32	3	1	0	5 (Note: Appearances in UEFA Europa League)	0	1 (Note: Appearance in Supercoppa Italiana)	0	39	3
Lazio	2018–19	Serie A	26	1	4	0	4	1	—		34	2
Lazio	2019–20	Serie A	15	2	0	0	0	0	0	0	15	2
Lazio	2020–21	Serie A	36	2	2	0	8 (Note: Appearances in UEFA Champions League)	0	—		46	2
Lazio	2021–22	Serie A	33	1	2	0	6	0	—		41	1
Lazio	2022–23	Serie A	33	0	2	0	9 (Note: Six appearances in UEFA Europa League, three appearances in UEFA Europa Conference League)	0	—		44	0
Lazio	2023–24	Serie A	37	1	4	0	7	0	1	0	49	1
Lazio	2024–25	Serie A	35	4	1	0	12	0	—		48	4
Lazio	2025–26	Serie A	33	1	5	0	—		—		38	1
Lazio	2026–27	Serie A	1	0	1	0	—		0	0	2	0
Lazio	Total		281	15	22	0	51	1	2	0	356	16
Career total			476	45	30	1	51	1	3	0	560	47

=== International ===
As of match played 5 June 2026

Appearances and goals by national team and year
National team	Year	Apps	Goals
Montenegro	2015	7	0
Montenegro	2016	6	0
Montenegro	2017	5	0
Montenegro	2018	7	0
Montenegro	2019	8	0
Montenegro	2020	4	0
Montenegro	2021	7	2
Montenegro	2022	8	1
Montenegro	2023	5	0
Montenegro	2024	7	1
Montenegro	2025	4	1
Montenegro	2026	2	0
Total		70	5

Scores and results list Montenegro's goal tally first.

List of international goals scored by Adam Marušić
No.	Date	Venue	Opponent	Score	Result	Competition
1	1 September 2021	Vodafone Park, Istanbul, Turkey	Turkey	1–2	2–2	2022 FIFA World Cup qualification
2	8 October 2021	Victoria Stadium, Gibraltar	Gibraltar	1–0	3–0	2022 FIFA World Cup qualification
3	11 June 2022	City Stadium, Podgorica, Montenegro	Bosnia and Herzegovina	1–1	1–1	2022–23 UEFA Nations League B
4	21 March 2024	Mardan Sports Complex, Antalya, Turkey	Belarus	1–0	2–0	Friendly
5	22 March 2025	Gradski stadion, Nikšić, Montenegro	Gibraltar	3–1	3–1	2026 FIFA World Cup qualification

== Honours ==
Voždovac

- Serbian League Belgrade: 2011–12

Oostende

- Belgian Cup runner-up: 2016–17

Lazio

- Coppa Italia: 2018–19; runner-up: 2025–26
- Supercoppa Italiana: 2017, 2019
