= Dimitrije Kamenović =

Serbian footballer (born 2000)

Dimitrije Kamenović Димитрије Каменовић
Personal information
- Date of birth: 16 July 2000 (age 26)
- Place of birth: Pirot, FR Yugoslavia
- Height: 1.88 m (6 ft 2 in)
- Positions: Left-back; center-back

Team information
- Current team: Lokomotiva Zagreb
- Number: 33

Youth career
- –2019: Čukarički

Senior career*
Years	Team	Apps	(Gls)
2019–2021	Čukarički	50	(2)
2021–2026	Lazio	1	(0)
2023	→ Sparta Prague (loan)	2	(0)
2023	→ Sparta Prague B (loan)	7	(1)
2024–2025	→ Yverdon (loan)	21	(1)
2026–	Lokomotiva Zagreb	11	(0)

International career^{‡}
2016–2017	Serbia U17	8	(0)
2017–2019	Serbia U19	6	(1)
2019–2022	Serbia U21	12	(1)
- * Club domestic league appearances and goals as of 15 June 2026 ‡ National team caps and goals as of 7 June 2022

Dimitrije Kamenović (Serbian Cyrillic: Димитрије Каменовић; born 16 July 2000) is a Serbian professional footballer who plays as a left-back and centre-back for Croatian club Lokomotiva Zagreb.

== Club career ==
On 14 July 2021, Kamenović joined Serie A side Lazio from FK Čukarički on a five-year deal. The Biancocelesti paid €3 million for the Serbian defender.

On 31 January 2022, Lazio officially deposited Kamenović's contract with Lega Serie A.

On 2 February 2022, Lazio included Kamenović in their UEFA Europa League squad list.

On 30 December 2022, Kamenović joined Czech First League side Sparta Prague on loan from Lazio.

On 15 February 2024, Kamenović was loaned to Yverdon in Switzerland.

On 17 January 2026, Kamenović signed with Lokomotiva Zagreb in Croatia.

== Career statistics ==
=== Club ===
As of match played 21 May 2022

Appearances and goals by club, season and competition
Club	Season	League			National cup (Note: Includes Serbian Cup)		Europe		Total	
Club	Season	Division	Apps	Goals	Apps	Goals	Apps	Goals	Apps	Goals
FK Čukarički	2018–19	Serbian SuperLiga	3	0	0	0	—		3	0
FK Čukarički	2019–20	Serbian SuperLiga	17	0	4	0	1 (Note: Appearance in UEFA Europa League)	0	22	0
FK Čukarički	2020–21	Serbian SuperLiga	30	2	2	0	—		32	2
FK Čukarički	Total		50	2	6	0	1	0	57	2
Lazio	2021–22	Serie A	1	0	0	0	0	0	1	0
Lazio	2022–23	Serie A	0	0	0	0	0	0	0	0
Lazio	2023–24	Serie A	0	0	0	0	0	0	0	0
Lazio	Total		1	0	0	0	0	0	1	0
Sparta Prague (loan)	2022–23	Czech First League	2	0	0	0	0	0	2	0
Career total			53	2	6	0	1	0	60	2

== Honours ==
=== Club ===
Sparta Prague

- Czech First League: 2022–23
