= Marco Bertini =

Italian footballer (born 2002)

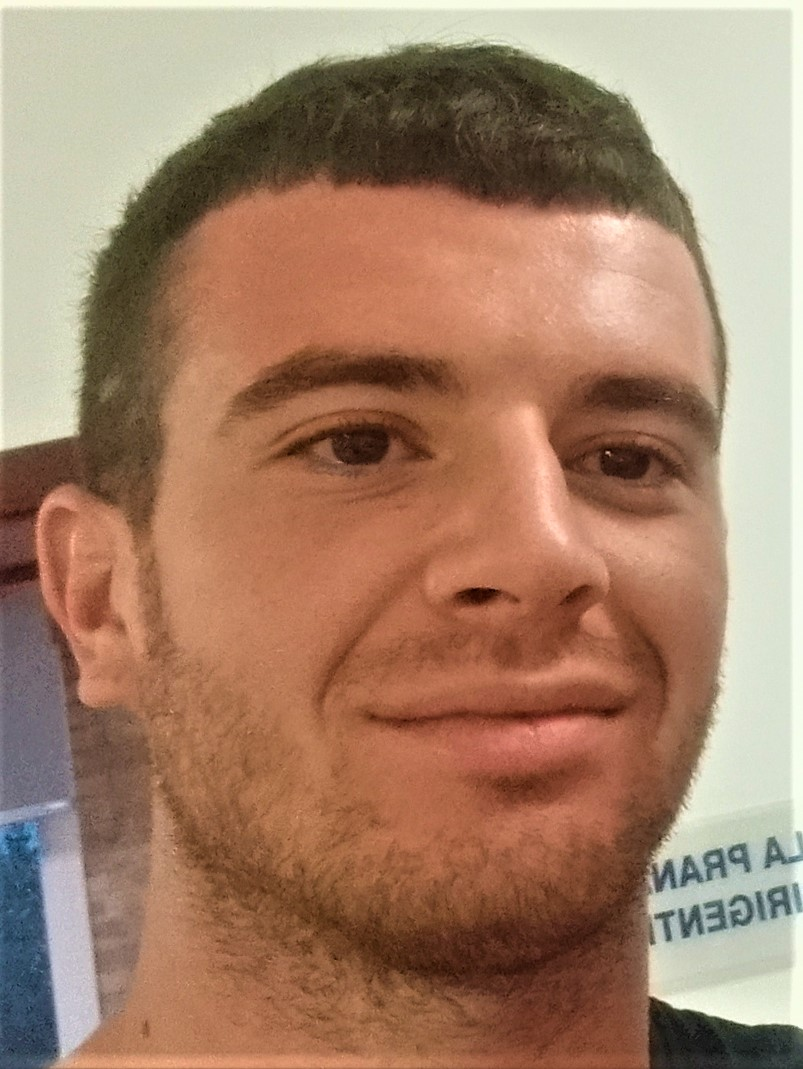

Personal information
- Date of birth: 7 August 2002 (age 24)
- Place of birth: Rome, Italy
- Height: 1.85 m (6 ft 1 in)
- Position: Defensive midfielder

Team information
- Current team: Pianese
- Number: 27

Youth career
- Lazio

Senior career*
Years	Team	Apps	(Gls)
2021–2025	Lazio	2	(0)
2023–2024	→ SPAL (loan)	14	(2)
2024–2025	→ Ascoli (loan)	20	(0)
2025–	Pianese	33	(4)
- * Club domestic league appearances and goals as of 30 April 2026

Marco Bertini (born 7 August 2002) is an Italian professional footballer who plays as a defensive midfielder for Serie C Group B club Pianese.

== Professional career ==
Bertini is a youth product of Lazio, and often captained their youth sides. He made his professional debut with Lazio in a 2–0 Serie A loss to Sassuolo on 23 May 2021.

On 12 July 2024, Bertini joined Ascoli in Serie C on loan with an option to buy.
