= 2017–18 Parma Calcio 1913 season =

Parma
2017–18 season
- President: Jiang Lizhang
- Manager: Roberto D'Aversa
- Stadium: Stadio Ennio Tardini
- Serie B: 2nd (Promoted to Serie A)
- Coppa Italia: Second round
- Top goalscorer: League: Emanuele Calaiò (13); All: Emanuele Calaiò (14)
Home colours	Away colours	Third colours

The 2017–18 season was Parma's first season in Serie B since 2009. Parma were promoted by winning the 2016–17 Lega Pro promotion play-offs, which was the second consecutive promotion for Parma since the club's bankruptcy in 2015.

Parma achieved their third consecutive promotion on 18 May 2018 by finishing second in the 2017–18 Serie B season, making a return to Serie A for the season 2018–19 season. On 23 July 2018, Parma were handed a 5-point deduction for the 2018–19 Serie A season, following text messages from Parma player Emanuele Calaio "eliciting a reduced effort" from two players of Spezia, a match Parma won 2–0 to secure promotion this season.

== Squad ==
As of 28 August 2017

No.	Name	Nationality	Position	Date of birth (age)	Previous club
Goalkeepers
1	Pierluigi Frattali	(Italy)	GK	1 December 1985 (aged 32)	(Italy) Avellino
22	Michele Nardi	(Italy)	GK	9 July 1986 (aged 31)	(Italy) Santarcangelo
35	Andrea Dini	(Italy)	GK	20 February 1996 (aged 22)	San Marino Calcio
Defenders
2	Simone Iacoponi	(Italy)	RB	30 April 1987 (aged 31)	(Italy) Virtus Entella
5	Valerio Di Cesare	(Italy)	CB	23 May 1983 (aged 34)	(Italy) Bari
6	Alessandro Lucarelli (captain)	(Italy)	CB	22 July 1977 (aged 40)	(Italy) Genoa
16	Armando Anastasio	(Italy)	LB	24 July 1996 (aged 21)	Loan from (Italy) Napoli
23	Marcello Gazzola	(Italy)	CB	3 April 1985 (aged 33)	(Italy) Sassuolo
28	Riccardo Gagliolo	(Italy)	LB	28 April 1990 (aged 28)	(Italy) Carpi
31	Francisco Sierralta	(Chile)	RB	6 May 1997 (aged 21)	Loan from (Italy) Udinese
Midfielders
4	Antonio Junior Vacca	(Italy)	MF	13 May 1990 (aged 28)	(Italy) Foggia
10	Yves Baraye	(Senegal)	AM	21 June 1992 (aged 25)	(Italy) Torres
11	Gianni Munari	(Italy)	MF	24 June 1983 (aged 34)	(Italy) Cagliari
17	Antonino Barillà	(Italy)	MF	1 April 1988 (aged 30)	(Italy) Trapani
21	Matteo Scozzarella	(Italy)	MF	5 June 1988 (aged 29)	(Italy) Trapani
26	Luca Siligardi	(Italy)	AM	26 January 1988 (aged 30)	(Italy) Hellas Verona
29	Manuel Scavone	(Italy)	MF	3 June 1987 (aged 30)	(Italy) Pro Vercelli
33	Jacopo Dezi	(Italy)	MF	10 February 1992 (aged 26)	Loan from (Italy) Napoli
Forwards
7	Pasquale Mazzocchi	(Italy)	FW	27 July 1995 (aged 22)	(Italy) Rimini
8	Amato Ciciretti	(Italy)	FW	31 December 1993 (aged 24)	Loan from (Italy) Benevento
9	Emanuele Calaiò	(Italy)	CF	8 January 1982 (aged 36)	(Italy) Spezia
14	Marco Frediani	(Italy)	LW	14 March 1994 (aged 24)	(Italy) Ancona
15	Alessio Da Cruz	(Netherlands)	FW	18 January 1997 (aged 21)	(Italy) Novara
19	Roberto Insigne	(Italy)	FW	11 May 1994 (aged 24)	Loan from (Italy) Napoli
20	Antonio Di Gaudio	(Italy)	LW	16 August 1989 (aged 28)	(Italy) Carpi
30	Fabio Ceravolo	(Italy)	FW	5 March 1987 (aged 31)	Loan from (Italy) Benevento

=== Out on loan ===
Note: Flags indicate national team as defined under FIFA eligibility rules; some limited exceptions apply. Players may hold more than one non-FIFA nationality.

No.	Pos.	Nation	Player
1	GK	LAT	Kristaps Zommers (loan to Pordenone until 30 June 2018)
23	DF	ITA	Giacomo Ricci (loan to Pro Piacenza until 30 June 2018)
24	MF	ITA	Francesco Giorno (loan to Modena until 30 June 2018)
28	MF	ITA	Lorenzo Simonetti (loan to Renate until 30 June 2018)
—	FW	ARG	Facundo Lescano (loan to Siena until 30 June 2018)
—	MF	ITA	Francesco Galuppini (loan to Modena until 30 June 2018)
—	DF	ITA	Giovanni Pinto (loan to Ascoli until 30 June 2018)

== Transfers ==
=== Summer ===
In: Note: Flags indicate national team as defined under FIFA eligibility rules; some limited exceptions apply. Players may hold more than one non-FIFA nationality.

No.	Pos.	Nation	Player
13	DF	URU	Juan Ramos (from (Italy) Casertana)
14	FW	ITA	Marco Frediani (from (Italy) Roma)
17	MF	ITA	Antonino Barillà (from (Italy) Trapani)
19	FW	ITA	Roberto Insigne (loan from (Italy) Napoli)
20	FW	ITA	Antonio Di Gaudio (from (Italy) Carpi)
22	GK	ITA	Michele Nardi (from (Italy) Santarcangelo)
24	MF	ITA	Francesco Giorno (from (Italy) Casertana)
25	DF	ITA	Luca Germoni (loan from (Italy) Lazio)
26	FW	ITA	Luca Siligardi (from (Italy) Hellas Verona)
28	DF	ITA	Riccardo Gagliolo (loan from (Italy) Carpi)
30	FW	ITA	Fabio Ceravolo (from (Italy) Benevento)
31	DF	CHI	Francisco Sierralta (loan from (Italy) Udinese)
33	MF	ITA	Jacopo Dezi (loan from (Italy) Napoli)
35	GK	ITA	Andrea Dini (from San Marino)
—	DF	ITA	Giovanni Pinto (from (Italy) Monopoli 1966)
—	MF	ITA	Francesco Galuppini (from (Italy) Ciliverghe Mazzano)
—		ITA	Federico Bachis (from (Italy) Torres)
—		ITA	Sebastiano Longo (from (Italy) Messina)
—		ITA	Riccardo Santovito (from (Italy) Latina)

Out: Note: Flags indicate national team as defined under FIFA eligibility rules; some limited exceptions apply. Players may hold more than one non-FIFA nationality.

No.	Pos.	Nation	Player
1	GK	LAT	Kristaps Zommers (loan to (Italy) Pordenone)
21	DF	ITA	Leonardo Nunzella (to (Italy) Pordenone)
23	DF	ITA	Giacomo Ricci (loan to (Italy) Pro Piacenza)
24	MF	ITA	Francesco Giorno (loan to (Italy) Modena)
28	MF	ITA	Lorenzo Simonetti (loan to (Italy) Renate)
—	DF	ITA	Giovanni Pinto (loan to (Italy) Ascoli)
—	MF	ITA	Francesco Galuppini (loan to (Italy) Modena)
—	FW	ARG	Facundo Lescano (loan to (Italy) Robur Siena)
—	FW	ITA	Felice Evacuo (to (Italy) Trapani)

== Competitions ==
=== Serie B ===
==== League table ====
Pos	Team	Pld	W	D	L	GF	GA	GD	Pts	Promotion, qualification or relegation
1	Empoli (C, P)	42	24	13	5	88	49	+39	85	Promotion to Serie A
2	Parma (P)	42	21	9	12	57	37	+20	72 (Note: Parma is ahead of Frosinone on head-to-head goal difference: Parma 2–0 Frosinone, Frosinone 2–1 Parma.)	Promotion to Serie A
3	Frosinone (O, P)	42	19	15	8	65	47	+18	72	Qualification to promotion play-offs semi-finals
4	Palermo	42	18	17	7	59	39	+20	71	Qualification to promotion play-offs semi-finals
5	Venezia	42	17	16	9	56	42	+14	67	Qualification to promotion play-offs preliminary round
6	Cittadella	42	18	12	12	61	48	+13	66	Qualification to promotion play-offs preliminary round
7	Bari (Note: Bari was deducted two points for administrative irregularities. The team was reestablished in 2018 after the bankruptcy of the previous legal person) (R, D, R)	42	18	13	11	59	48	+11	65	Relegation to Serie D (Note: Bari, Cesena and Avellino were excluded from the league after the season for financial issues.)
8	Perugia	42	16	12	14	67	58	+9	60	Qualification to promotion play-offs preliminary round
9	Foggia	42	16	10	16	66	68	−2	58	
10	Spezia	42	13	14	15	46	45	+1	53	
11	Carpi	42	12	16	14	32	46	−14	52	
12	Salernitana	42	11	18	13	51	58	−7	51	
13	Cesena (Note: A.C. Cesena bankrupted in mid-2018. A.S.D. Romagna Centro Cesena; another team from Cesena was renamed to Cesena F.C. which would participate in 2018–19 Serie D) (E, R)	42	11	17	14	55	61	−6	50	Relegation to Serie D
14	Cremonese	42	9	21	12	48	47	+1	48 (Note: Head-to-head points: Cremonese 10 pts, Avellino 8 pts, Brescia 7 pts, Pescara 6 pts.)	
15	Avellino (R, E, R, R)	42	11	15	16	49	60	−11	48	Relegation to Serie D
16	Brescia	42	11	15	16	41	52	−11	48	
17	Pescara	42	11	15	16	50	64	−14	48	
18	Ascoli (O)	42	11	13	18	40	60	−20	46	Qualification to relegation play-out
19	Virtus Entella (R)	42	10	14	18	41	54	−13	44 (Note: Virtus Entella is ahead of Novara on head-to-head points: Virtus Entella 2–1 Novara, Novara 0–1 Virtus Entella.)	Qualification to relegation play-out
20	Novara (R)	42	10	14	18	42	52	−10	44	Relegation to Serie C
21	Pro Vercelli (R)	42	9	13	20	47	70	−23	40	Relegation to Serie C
22	Ternana (R)	42	7	16	19	62	77	−15	37	Relegation to Serie C

Source: Lega Serie B
Rules for classification: 1) Points; 2) Head-to-head points; 3) Head-to-head goal difference; 4) Goal difference; 5) Goals scored; 6) Draw.
(C) Champions; (D) Disqualified; (E) Eliminated; (O) Play-off winners; (P) Promoted; (R) Relegated

==== Results summary ====
Overall								Home						Away					
Pld	W	D	L	GF	GA	GD	Pts	W	D	L	GF	GA	GD	W	D	L	GF	GA	GD
42	21	9	12	57	37	+20	72	12	6	3	34	13	+21	9	3	9	23	24	−1

Last updated: 18 May 2018.
Source: See Results

==== Results by matchday ====
Matchday	1	2	3	4	5	6	7	8	9	10	11	12	13	14	15	16	17	18	19	20	21	22	23	24	25	26	27	28	29	30	31	32	33	34	35	36	37	38	39	40	41	42
Ground	H	A	H	A	H	A	H	A	H	H	A	H	A	A	H	A	H	A	H	A	H	A	H	A	H	A	H	A	A	A	H	A	H	H	H	A	H	A	H	A	H	A
Result	W	W	L	L	L	W	D	D	L	W	W	W	L	W	W	L	W	D	D	D	D	L	W	L	D	L	D	W	W	L	W	W	W	W	D	W	W	L	W	L	W	W
Position	9	5	6	11	14	9	11	10	15	10	6	4	8	5	2	4	1	2	3	4	4	7	4	5	6	8	9	7	5	5	9	8	5	4	4	3	2	2	2	4	3	2

Updated to match(es) played on 18 May 2018. Source: See results
A = Away; H = Home; W = Win; D = Draw; L = Loss

==== Results ====
25 August 2017 1	Parma	1 – 0	Cremonese	Parma
20:30 CEST (UTC+2)	Calaiò 40' (pen.); Munari (yellow card) 45'; Insigne (yellow card) 90+3'	Report	Salviato (yellow card) 84'; Pesce (yellow card) 90+4'	Stadium: Stadio Ennio Tardini; Attendance: 11,387; Referee: Eugenio Abbattista

3 September 2017 2	Novara	0 – 1	Parma	Novara
20:30 CEST (UTC+2)	Di Mariano (yellow card) 37'; Mantovani (yellow card) 39'; Da Cruz (yellow card) 69'	Report	Barillà (yellow card) 9' (goal) 21'; Calaiò (yellow card) 85'	Stadium: Stadio Silvio Piola; Attendance: 4,581; Referee: Daniele Martinelli

10 September 2017 3	Parma	0 – 1	Brescia	Parma
17:30 CEST (UTC+2)	Barillà (yellow card) 31'; Di Cesare (yellow card) 59'; Scavone (red card) 73'; Gagliolo (yellow card) 90+3'	Report	Ferrante 60' (yellow card) 60'; Somma (yellow card) 78'; Bisoli (yellow card) 84'	Stadium: Stadio Ennio Tardini; Attendance: 11,541; Referee: Daniele Minelli

16 September 2017 4	Perugia	3 – 0	Parma	Perugia
15:00 CEST (UTC+2)	Volta (yellow card) 4'; Han Kwang-song 18'; Buonaiuto 51', 67'; Monaco (yellow card) 90+3'	Report	Munari (yellow card) 50'; Di Cesare (yellow card) 73'	Stadium: Stadio Renato Curi; Referee: Davide Ghersini

19 September 2017 5	Parma	1 – 2	Empoli	Parma
20:30 CEST (UTC+2)	Lucarelli 47'	Report	Caputo 23'; Šimić 49' (yellow card) 51'; Pasqual (yellow card) 87'	Stadium: Stadio Ennio Tardini; Attendance: 10,221; Referee: Gianluca Aureliano

23 September 2017 6	Venezia	0 – 1	Parma	Venice
15:00 CEST (UTC+2)	Zampano (yellow card) 45+1'; Domizzi (yellow card) 72'; Fabiano (yellow card) 83'	Report	Calaiò (yellow card) 50'; Di Cesare 55'; Scavone (yellow card) 90+4'	Stadium: Stadio Pier Luigi Penzo; Referee: Antonio Balice

29 September 2017 7	Parma	2 – 2	Salernitana	Parma
20:30 CEST (UTC+2)	Di Cesare 17' (red card) 72'; Lucarelli 32'; Iacoponi (red card) 78'; Scaglia (yellow card) 90+5'	Report	Odjer (yellow card) 43'; Sprocati 56'; S. Kiyine (yellow card) 59'; Vitale 81' (pen.); Minala (yellow card) 90'	Stadium: Stadio Ennio Tardini; Attendance: 11,493; Referee: Aleandro Di Paolo

8 October 2017 8	Palermo	1 – 1	Parma	Palermo
15:00 CEST (UTC+2)	La Gumina 10'; Bellusci (yellow card) 33'; Embaló (yellow card) 38'; Murawski (yellow card) 45+2'	Report	Gagliolo (yellow card) 21' (goal) 71'; Scozzarella (yellow card) 59'; Barillà (yellow card) 82'	Stadium: Stadio Renzo Barbera; Referee: Juan Luca Sacchi

14 October 2017 9	Parma	0 – 1	Pescara	Parma
15:00 CEST (UTC+2)	Iacoponi (yellow card) 28'; Scavone (yellow card) 30'	Report	Palazzi (yellow card) 57'; Brugman 85' (yellow card) 86'; Fiorillo (yellow card) 90+1'	Stadium: Stadio Ennio Tardini; Attendance: 11,370; Referee: Niccolò Baroni

21 October 2017 10	Parma	3 – 1	Virtus Entella	Parma
15:00 CEST (UTC+2)	Lucarelli 34'; Barillà (yellow card) 44'; Calaiò 82'; Insigne 90+3' (yellow card) 90+4'	Report	Benedetti (yellow card) 33'; Palermo (yellow card) 50'; Luppi 52'; Iacobucci (yellow card) 80'	Stadium: Stadio Ennio Tardini; Attendance: 10,178; Referee: Antonio Di Martino

24 October 2017 11	Foggia	0 – 3	Parma	Foggia
20:30 CEST (UTC+2)	G. Loiacono (yellow card) 16'	Report	Gagliolo 12'; Frattali (yellow card) 68'; Insigne 74'; Calaiò 85' (pen.)	Stadium: Stadio Pino Zaccheria; Referee: Marco Piccinini

29 October 2017 12	Parma	2 – 0	Avellino	Parma
15:00 CET (UTC+1)	Di Gaudio 1'; Scavone (yellow card) 13'; P. Mazzocchi (yellow card) 90+2'; Insigne 90+4'	Report	Laverone (yellow card) 20'; Suagher (yellow card) 25'; D'Angelo (yellow card) 69'; Di Tacchio (yellow card) 75'	Stadium: Stadio Ennio Tardini; Attendance: 11,535; Referee: Livio Marinelli

4 November 2017 13	Frosinone	2 – 1	Parma	Frosinone
15:00 CET (UTC+1)	Maiello 8'; Ciano 26'; Dionisi (yellow card) 44'; Ariaudo (yellow card) 46'	Report	Maiello 37' (o.g.); P. Mazzocchi (yellow card) 44'; Calaiò (yellow card) 61'	Stadium: Stadio Benito Stirpe; Attendance: 11,403; Referee: Luigi Nasca

12 November 2017 14	Cittadella	1 – 2	Parma	Cittadella
15:00 CET (UTC+1)	Iori (yellow card) 6' (goal) 73' (pen.); Litteri (yellow card) 69'; Adorni (red card) 80'	Report	Calaiò 41', 84'; Barillà (yellow card) 77'	Stadium: Stadio Pier Cesare Tombolato; Referee: Marco Serra

18 November 2017 15	Parma	4 – 0	Ascoli	Parma
15:00 CET (UTC+1)	Iacoponi 6'; Lanni 74' (o.g.); Lucarelli (yellow card) 82'; Scozzarella (yellow card) 86'; Baraye 87'; Munari 90+4'	Report	Addae (red card) 77'; Gigliotti (yellow card) 82'	Stadium: Stadio Ennio Tardini; Attendance: 10,629; Referee: Antonio Giua

25 November 2017 16	Carpi	2 – 1	Parma	Carpi
15:00 CET (UTC+1)	Pasciuti 5'; Verna 10'; Pachonik (yellow card) 46'	Report	Insigne 22'; Munari (yellow card) 68'	Stadium: Stadio Sandro Cabassi; Attendance: 3,158; Referee: Francesco Fourneau

2 December 2017 17	Parma	3 – 0	Pro Vercelli	Parma
15:00 CET (UTC+1)	Lucarelli (yellow card) 44'; Insigne 55'; Scavone 57'; Corapi 90'	Report	Castiglia (yellow card) 20'; Konaté (red card) 53'; Vives (yellow card) 59'; Bruno (yellow card) 59'; Mammarella (yellow card) 78'	Stadium: Stadio Ennio Tardini; Attendance: 9,850; Referee: Daniele Martinelli

8 December 2017 18	Ternana	1 – 1	Parma	Terni
15:00 CET (UTC+1)	Paolucci (yellow card) 47'; Valjent (yellow card) 71'; Tremolada 74'; Gasparetto (yellow card) 83'	Report	Di Gaudio 21'; Iacoponi (yellow card) 37'; Insigne (yellow card) 90+1'	Stadium: Stadio Libero Liberati; Referee: Niccolo Baroni

16 December 2017 19	Parma	0 – 0	Cesena	Parma
15:00 CET (UTC+1)	Iacoponi (yellow card) 51'; Scozzarella (yellow card) 89'	Report	Cascione (yellow card) 29'; Scognamiglio (yellow card) 34'; Fazzi (yellow card) 41'; Donkor (yellow card) 60'	Stadium: Stadio Ennio Tardini; Attendance: 10,507; Referee: Antonio Di Martino

21 December 2017 20	Bari	0 – 0	Parma	Bari
20:30 CET (UTC+1)	Petriccione (yellow card) 30'; Tonucci (yellow card) 42'; Cassani (yellow card) 65'; Sabelli (yellow card) 66'	Report	Scavone (yellow card) 33'; Scozzarella (yellow card) 84'	Stadium: Stadio San Nicola; Referee: Marco Piccinini

27 December 2017 21	Parma	0 – 0	Spezia	Parma
20:30 CET (UTC+1)	Lucarelli (red card) 42'; Di Cesare (yellow card) 57'; Sierralta (yellow card) 90+1'	Report	Bolzoni (yellow card) 24'; Terzi (yellow card) 47'; Maggiore (yellow card) 48'; De Col (yellow card) 88'	Stadium: Stadio Ennio Tardini; Attendance: 10,984; Referee: Riccardo Ros

20 January 2018 22	Cremonese	1 – 0	Parma	Cremona
15:00 CET (UTC+1)	Almici (yellow card) 11'; Castrovili (yellow card) 76'; Cavion 89'	Report	Gagliolo (yellow card) 35'	Stadium: Stadio Giovanni Zini; Attendance: 10,958; Referee: Luigi Nasca

27 January 2018 23	Parma	3 – 0	Novara	Parma
15:00 CET (UTC+1)	Di Gaudio (yellow card) 15'; Lucarelli 42'; Frattali (yellow card) 43'; Calaiò 45+1' (pen.); Scavone 78'; Vacca (yellow card) 86'	Report	Di Mariano (yellow card) 29'; Mantovani (red card) 45'; Ronaldo (yellow card) 44'; Maniero (yellow card) 61'	Stadium: Stadio Ennio Tardini; Attendance: 10,168; Referee: Francesco Paolo Saia

3 February 2018 24	Brescia	2 – 1	Parma	Brescia
15:00 CET (UTC+1)	Torregrossa 38', 64'; Tonali (yellow card) 59'; Gastaldello (yellow card) 62'; Somma (yellow card) 75'	Report	Vacca (yellow card) 29'; Ceravolo 58'; Gazzola (yellow card) 73' da Cruz (yellow card) 83'	Stadium: Stadio Mario Rigamonti; Referee: Gianluca Aureliano

11 February 2018 25	Parma	1 – 1	Perugia	Parma
15:00 CET (UTC+1)	Barillà (yellow card) 30'; Scavone (yellow card) 39'; Dezi (yellow card) 58'; Ceravolo 84' (pen.); Gagliolo (yellow card) 89'	Report	Volta (yellow card) 26'; Bianco (yellow card) 34'; Cerri 60'; C. Kouan (yellow card) 89'	Stadium: Stadio Ennio Tardini; Referee: Marco Serra

17 February 2018 26	Empoli	4 – 0	Parma	Empoli
15:00 CET (UTC+1)	Donnarumma 13', 41'; Caputo 50'; Veseli (yellow card) 89'; Maietta 90+5'	Report	Barillà (yellow card) 62'	Stadium: Stadio Carlo Castellani; Attendance: 4,491; Referee: Juan Luca Sacchi

23 February 2018 27	Parma	1 – 1	Venezia	Parma
21:00 CET (UTC+1)	Scavone (yellow card) 43'; Calaiò 75' (pen.)	Report	Garofalo (yellow card) 37'; Štulac (yellow card) 45+1'; Modolo (yellow card) 50'; Firenze 66'; Anđelković (yellow card) 74'	Stadium: Stadio Ennio Tardini; Attendance: 10,216; Referee: Aleandro Di Paolo

27 February 2018 28	Salernitana	0 – 1	Parma	Salerno
20:30 CET (UTC+1)	Schiavi (yellow card) 45'; Ricci (yellow card) 51'	Report	Dezi 33'; Iacoponi (yellow card) 36'; Calaiò (yellow card) 45'	Stadium: Stadio Arechi; Attendance: 5,826; Referee: Riccardo Pinzani

10 March 2018 29	Pescara	1 – 4	Parma	Pescara
15:00 CET (UTC+1)	Valzania (yellow card) 44'; Perrotta (yellow card) 66'; Bunino 79'	Report	Calaiò 10'; Gazzola (yellow card) 52'; Baraye (yellow card) 65'; Scavone (yellow card) 66' (goal) 83'; Ceravolo 69'; Gagliolo 72'	Stadium: Stadio Adriatico; Attendance: 7,072; Referee: Lorenzo Illuzzi

17 March 2018 30	Virtus Entella	2 – 0	Parma	Chiavari
15:00 CET (UTC+1)	Acampora (yellow card) 11'; La Mantia 45+1' 89'; De Santis (yellow card) 86'	Report	Gazzola (yellow card) 41'; Frattali (yellow card) 90'	Stadium: Stadio Comunale; Attendance: 2,910; Referee: Riccardo Ros

25 March 2018 31	Parma	3 – 1	Foggia	Parma
11:30 CET (UTC+1)	Gazzola (yellow card) 38'; Baraye (yellow card) 73'; Calaiò 73'; Siligardi 81' (yellow card) 82'; Ceravolo 89'	Report	Loicono (red card) 14'; Mazzeo 24'; Tonucci (yellow card) 43'	Stadium: Stadio Ennio Tardini; Attendance: 14,820; Referee: Niccolo Baroni

29 March 2018 32	Avellino	1 – 2	Parma	Avellino
19:30 CET (UTC+1)	Krešić (yellow card) 14'; D'Angelo (yellow card) 15'; Asencio 33'; Di Tacchio (yellow card) 50'	Report	Gagliolo 4'; Barillà 8'; Dezi (yellow card) 42'; Insigne (yellow card) 87'	Stadium: Stadio Partenio-Adriano Lombardi; Attendance: 3,463; Referee: Livio Marinelli

2 April 2018 33	Parma	3 – 2	Palermo	Parma
19:30 CET (UTC+1)	Calaiò 31', 39' (pen.), 47'; Lucarelli (yellow card) 67'; Scavone (yellow card) 90+4'	Report	Nestorovski (yellow card) 33', (goal) 52'; Pomini (yellow card) 34'; Rispoli (yellow card) 35'; Coronado (yellow card) 64'; Gnahoré (yellow card) 71'; Rajković 90+3'	Stadium: Stadio Ennio Tardini; Attendance: 11,261; Referee: Livio Marinelli

7 April 2018 34	Parma	2 – 0	Frosinone	Parma
14:00 CET (UTC+1)	Di Gaudio 20', 37'; Vacca (yellow card) 79'	Report	Brighenti (yellow card) 10'; Ciano (yellow card) 52'	Stadium: Stadio Ennio Tardini; Attendance: 11,651; Referee: Ivano Pezzuto

13 April 2018 35	Parma	0 – 0	Cittadella	Parma
20:00 CET (UTC+1)	Lucarelli (yellow card) 43'; Frattali (yellow card) 75'	Report	Settembrini (yellow card) 21'; Pizzi (yellow card) 61'	Stadium: Stadio Ennio Tardini; Attendance: 11,782; Referee: Gianluca Aureliano

16 April 2018 36	Ascoli	0–1	Parma	Ascoli Piceno
19:30 CET (UTC+1)	Mengoni (yellow card) 42'; D'Urso (yellow card) 90+5'	Report	Calaiò 3'; Barillà (yellow card) 70'	Stadium: Stadio Cino e Lillo Del Duca; Attendance: 5,392; Referee: Serra Marco

21 April 2018 37	Parma	2–1	Carpi	Parma
14:00 CET (UTC+1)	Barillà 25', 48'; Sierralta (yellow card) 45'; Mazzocchi (yellow card) 60'	Report	M'Baye (yellow card) 10'; Poli 54'	Stadium: Stadio Ennio Tardini; Attendance: 11,151; Referee: Daniele Minelli

28 April 2018 38	Pro Vercelli	1–0	Parma	Vercelli
14:00 CET (UTC+1)	Castiglia 50', (yellow card) 81'; Raicevic (yellow card) 87'	Report	Ciciretti (yellow card) 90+2'	Stadium: Stadio Silvio Piola; Attendance: 3,078; Referee: Juan Luca Sacchi

1 May 2018 39	Parma	2–0	Ternana	Parma
19:30 CET (UTC+1)	Ceravolo 19'; Di Gaudio 39'; Ciciretti (yellow card) 72'; Di Cesare (yellow card) 83'	Report	Signori (yellow card) 34'; Signorini (yellow card) 89'	Stadium: Stadio Ennio Tardini; Attendance: 13,347; Referee: Francesco Paolo Saia

5 May 2018 40	Cesena	2–1	Parma	Cesena
14:00 CET (UTC+1)	Suagher (yellow card) 43'; Laribi (yellow card) 76'; Moncini 86', 90+5', (yellow card) 90+6'; Kupisz (red card) 89'	Report	Ciciretti (yellow card) 43'; Ceravolo 56'; Insigne (yellow card) 90'; Di Cesare (yellow card) 90+4'; Scavone (yellow card) 90+5'	Stadium: Stadio Dino Manuzzi; Attendance: 14,658; Referee: Francesco Fourneau

12 May 2018 41	Parma	1–0	Bari	Parma
14:00 CET (UTC+1)	Sierralta (yellow card) 20'; Gagliolo 59', (yellow card) 66'	Report	Basha (yellow card) 37'; Marrone (yellow card) 50'; Sabelli (yellow card) 55'; Empereur (red card) 84'; Gyömbér (yellow card) 84'	Stadium: Stadio Ennio Tardini; Referee: Aleandro Di Paolo

18 May 2018 42	Spezia	0 – 2	Parma	La Spezia
20:30 CET (UTC+1)	Gilardino (yellow card) 24'; López (yellow card) 42'	Report	Ceravolo 11' (yellow card) 23'; Sierralta (yellow card) 45'; Ciciretti 61' (yellow card) 62'	Stadium: Stadio Alberto Picco; Referee: Marco Piccinini

=== Coppa Italia ===
6 August 2017 Second Round	Bari	2 – 1	Parma	Bari
CEST (UTC+2)	Galano 36', 90'	Report	Calaiò 3' (pen.)	Stadium: Stadio San Nicola; Attendance: 11,347; Referee: Francesco Paolo Saia

== Squad statistics ==
As of Match played 28 April 2018

=== Appearances and goals ===
No.	Pos	Nat	Player	Total		Serie B		Coppa Italia	
No.	Pos	Nat	Player	Apps	Goals	Apps	Goals	Apps	Goals
1	GK	(Italy) ITA	Pierluigi Frattali	42	0	41	0	1	0
2	DF	(Italy) ITA	Simone Iacoponi	40	1	39	1	1	0
4	MF	(Italy) ITA	Antonio Junior Vacca	11	0	6+5	0	0	0
5	DF	(Italy) ITA	Valerio Di Cesare	20	2	16+3	2	1	0
6	DF	(Italy) ITA	Alessandro Lucarelli	32	4	29+2	4	1	0
7	FW	(Italy) ITA	Pasquale Mazzocchi	18	0	15+3	0	0	0
8	FW	(Italy) ITA	Amato Ciciretti	7	0	4+3	0	0	0
9	FW	(Italy) ITA	Emanuele Calaiò	34	14	25+8	13	1	1
10	MF	(Senegal) SEN	Yves Baraye	29	1	19+9	1	1	0
11	MF	(Italy) ITA	Gianni Munari	28	1	24+3	1	1	0
14	FW	(Italy) ITA	Marco Frediani	4	0	0+4	0	0	0
15	FW	(Netherlands) NED	Alessio Da Cruz	6	0	6	0	0	0
16	DF	(Italy) ITA	Armando Anastasio	7	0	1+6	0	0	0
17	MF	(Italy) ITA	Antonino Barillà	23	4	18+5	4	0	0
19	FW	(Italy) ITA	Roberto Insigne	31	5	22+8	5	0+1	0
20	FW	(Italy) ITA	Antonio Di Gaudio	35	5	26+9	5	0	0
21	MF	(Italy) ITA	Matteo Scozzarella	25	0	21+3	0	1	0
22	GK	(Italy) ITA	Michele Nardi	1	0	0+1	0	0	0
23	DF	(Italy) ITA	Marcello Gazzola	18	0	17+1	0	0	0
26	MF	(Italy) ITA	Luca Siligardi	19	1	11+7	1	1	0
28	DF	(Italy) ITA	Riccardo Gagliolo	37	5	36+1	5	0	0
29	MF	(Italy) ITA	Manuel Scavone	29	3	24+4	3	1	0
30	FW	(Italy) ITA	Fabio Ceravolo	17	6	7+10	6	0	0
31	DF	(Chile) CHI	Francisco Sierralta	9	0	3+6	0	0	0
33	MF	(Italy) ITA	Jacopo Dezi	34	1	29+5	1	0	0
Players who left Parma during the season:
4	MF	(Italy) ITA	Francesco Corapi	7	1	0+6	1	0+1	0
8	MF	(Italy) ITA	Luigi Scaglia	10	0	7+2	0	1	0
18	FW	(Italy) ITA	Manuel Nocciolini	10	0	3+6	0	0+1	0
25	DF	(Italy) ITA	Luca Germoni	5	0	2+3	0	0	0

=== Goal scorers ===
Place	Position	Nation	Number	Name	Serie B	Coppa Italia	Total
1	FW	(Italy)	9	Emanuele Calaiò	13	1	14
2	FW	(Italy)	30	Fabio Ceravolo	6	0	6
3	FW	(Italy)	19	Roberto Insigne	5	0	5
3	FW	(Italy)	20	Antonio Di Gaudio	5	0	5
3	DF	(Italy)	28	Riccardo Gagliolo	5	0	5
7	DF	(Italy)	6	Alessandro Lucarelli	4	0	4
7	MF	(Italy)	17	Antonino Barillà	4	0	4
8	MF	(Italy)	29	Manuel Scavone	3	0	3
9	DF	(Italy)	5	Valerio Di Cesare	2	0	2
9				Own goal	2	0	2
11	DF	(Italy)	2	Simone Iacoponi	1	0	1
11	MF	(Italy)	4	Francesco Corapi	1	0	1
11	MF	(Senegal)	10	Yves Baraye	1	0	1
11	MF	(Italy)	11	Gianni Munari	1	0	1
11	MF	(Italy)	26	Luca Siligardi	1	0	1
11	MF	(Italy)	33	Jacopo Dezi	1	0	1
TOTALS					55	1	56

=== Disciplinary record ===
Number	Nation	Position	Name	Serie B		Coppa Italia		Total	
Number	Nation	Position	Name	Yellow card	Red card	Yellow card	Red card	Yellow card	Red card
1	(Italy)	GK	Pierluigi Frattali	4	0	0	0	4	0
2	(Italy)	DF	Simone Iacoponi	4	1	0	0	4	1
4	(Italy)	MF	Antonio Junior Vacca	3	0	0	0	3	0
5	(Italy)	DF	Valerio Di Cesare	5	1	0	0	5	1
6	(Italy)	DF	Alessandro Lucarelli	5	1	0	0	5	1
7	(Italy)	FW	Pasquale Mazzocchi	3	0	0	0	3	0
8	(Italy)	FW	Amato Ciciretti	3	0	0	0	3	0
8	(Italy)	MF	Luigi Scaglia	1	0	0	0	1	0
9	(Italy)	FW	Emanuele Calaiò	4	0	0	0	4	0
10	(Senegal)	MF	Yves Baraye	2	0	0	0	2	0
11	(Italy)	MF	Gianni Munari	3	0	0	0	3	0
15	(Netherlands)	FW	Alessio Da Cruz	1	0	0	0	1	0
17	(Italy)	MF	Antonino Barillà	7	0	0	0	7	0
19	(Italy)	FW	Roberto Insigne	5	0	0	0	5	0
20	(Italy)	FW	Antonio Di Gaudio	1	0	0	0	1	0
21	(Italy)	FW	Matteo Scozzarella	4	0	1	0	5	0
23	(Italy)	DF	Marcello Gazzola	4	0	0	0	4	0
26	(Italy)	MF	Luca Siligardi	1	0	0	0	1	0
28	(Italy)	DF	Riccardo Gagliolo	5	0	0	0	5	0
29	(Italy)	MF	Manuel Scavone	9	1	0	0	9	1
31	(Chile)	DF	Francisco Sierralta	3	0	0	0	3	0
33	(Italy)	MF	Jacopo Dezi	2	0	0	0	2	0
TOTALS				76	4	1	0	77	4
