= 2018–19 Parma Calcio 1913 season =

Parma
2018–19 season
- President: Jiang Lizhang
- Manager: Roberto D'Aversa
- Stadium: Stadio Ennio Tardini
- Serie A: 14th
- Coppa Italia: Third round
- Top goalscorer: League: Gervinho (11); All: Gervinho (11)
- Highest home attendance: 20,814 vs Juventus (1 September 2018, Serie A)
- Lowest home attendance: 5,497 vs Pisa (12 August 2018, Coppa Italia)
- Average home league attendance: 16,522
| Home colours | Away colours | Third colours |

The 2018–19 season was Parma Calcio 1913's first season in Serie A since bankruptcy in 2015. The club competed in Serie A and in the Coppa Italia.

On 23 July 2018, Parma were handed a 5 point deduction for the 2018–19 Serie A season, following text messages from Parma player Emanuele Calaiò "eliciting a reduced effort" from two players of Spezia, a match Parma won 2–0 to secure promotion last season. However, that ban was overturned on 9 August following a decision by the Italian Football Federation's Board of Appeal.

== Players ==
=== Squad information ===
As of 26 May 2019
Appearances include league matches only

| No. | Name | Nat | Position(s) | Date of birth (age) | Signed from | Signed in | Contract ends | Apps. | Goals | Notes |
Goalkeepers
| 1 | Pierluigi Frattali | (Italy) | GK | 1 December 1985 (aged 33) | (Italy) Avellino | 2017 | 2019 | 56 | 0 | Vice-captain |
| 55 | Luigi Sepe | (Italy) | GK | 8 May 1991 (aged 28) | (Italy) Napoli | 2018 | 2019 | 37 | 0 | Loan |
Defenders
| 2 | Simone Iacoponi | (Italy) | RB / CB | 30 April 1987 (aged 32) | (Italy) Virtus Entella | 2017 | 2019 | 96 | 2 | |
| 3 | Federico Dimarco | (Italy) | LB | 10 November 1997 (aged 21) | (Italy) Internazionale | 2018 | 2019 | 13 | 1 | Loan |
| 13 | Francisco Sierralta | (Chile) | CB | 6 May 1997 (aged 22) | (Italy) Udinese | 2017 | 2019 | 16 | 0 | Loan |
| 18 | Massimo Gobbi | (Italy) | LB | 31 October 1980 (aged 38) | (Italy) Chievo | 2018 | 2019 | 171 | 4 | |
| 22 | Bruno Alves | (Portugal) | CB | 27 November 1981 (aged 37) | (Scotland) Rangers | 2018 | 2020 | 33 | 4 | Captain |
| 23 | Marcello Gazzola | (Italy) | RB | 3 April 1985 (aged 34) | (Italy) Sassuolo | 2018 | 2019 | 39 | 1 | |
| 28 | Riccardo Gagliolo | (Italy) | CB / LB | 28 April 1990 (aged 29) | (Italy) Carpi | 2017 | 2021 | 71 | 6 | |
| 95 | Alessandro Bastoni | (Italy) | CB | 13 April 1999 (aged 20) | (Italy) Internazionale | 2018 | 2019 | 24 | 1 | Loan |
Midfielders
| 5 | Leo Štulac | (Slovenia) | DM / CM | 26 September 1994 (aged 24) | (Italy) Venezia | 2018 | 2023 | 26 | 0 | |
| 8 | Abdou Diakhaté | (Senegal) | CM / DM | 31 December 1998 (aged 20) | (Italy) Fiorentina | 2019 | 2023 | 1 | 0 | |
| 11 | Gianni Munari | (Italy) | CM / RM | 24 June 1983 (aged 36) | (Italy) Cagliari | 2017 | 2019 | 56 | 4 | |
| 14 | Pepín | (Equatorial Guinea) | CM / DM / AM | 14 August 1996 (aged 22) | (Italy) Pescara | 2019 | 2019 | 2 | 0 | Loan |
| 17 | Antonino Barillà | (Italy) | CM | 1 April 1988 (aged 31) | (Italy) Trapani | 2017 | 2020 | 55 | 7 | |
| 21 | Matteo Scozzarella | (Italy) | DM / CM | 5 June 1988 (aged 31) | (Italy) Trapani | 2017 | 2019 | 67 | 0 | |
| 32 | Luca Rigoni | (Italy) | CM / RM / DM / AM | 7 December 1984 (aged 34) | (Italy) Genoa | 2018 | 2019 | 23 | 2 | |
| 33 | Jacopo Dezi | (Italy) | CM | 10 February 1992 (aged 27) | (Italy) Napoli | 2017 | 2022 | 36 | 1 | |
| 70 | Antonio Junior Vacca | (Italy) | DM / CM | 13 May 1990 (aged 29) | (Italy) Foggia | 2018 | 2020 | 11 | 0 | |
| 87 | Juraj Kucka | (Slovakia) | CM | 26 February 1987 (aged 32) | (Turkey) Trabzonspor | 2019 | 2022 | 18 | 4 | |
| 88 | Alberto Grassi | (Italy) | CM | 7 March 1995 (aged 24) | (Italy) Napoli | 2018 | 2019 | 7 | 0 | Loan |
Forwards
| 9 | Fabio Ceravolo | (Italy) | ST | 5 March 1987 (aged 32) | (Italy) Benevento | 2017 | 2020 | 43 | 9 | |
| 10 | Nicolás Schiappacasse | (Uruguay) | LW / CF / RW | 12 January 1999 (aged 20) | (Spain) Atlético Madrid | 2019 | 2020 | 3 | 0 | Loan |
| 26 | Luca Siligardi | (Italy) | RW / LW / ST | 26 January 1988 (aged 31) | (Italy) Hellas Verona | 2017 | 2020 | 47 | 2 | |
| 27 | Gervinho | (Ivory Coast) | LW / RW / ST | 27 May 1987 (aged 32) | Hebei China Fortune | 2018 | 2021 | 30 | 11 | |
| 45 | Roberto Inglese | (Italy) | ST | 12 November 1991 (aged 27) | (Italy) Napoli | 2018 | 2019 | 25 | 9 | Loan |
| 60 | Davide Mastaj | (Italy) | RW | 30 April 1998 (aged 21) | (Italy) Youth Sector | 2018 | – | 0 | 0 | |
| 72 | Emanuele Calaiò | (Italy) | ST | 8 January 1982 (aged 37) | (Italy) Spezia | 2016 | 2019 | 71 | 28 | Banned^{a} |
| 77 | Jonathan Biabiany | (France) | RW | 28 April 1988 (aged 31) | (Italy) Internazionale | 2018 | 2019 | 155 | 20 | |
| 93 | Mattia Sprocati | (Italy) | RW / LW / AM | 28 April 1993 (aged 26) | (Italy) Lazio | 2018 | 2019 | 16 | 1 | Loan |
| 99 | Yves Baraye | (Senegal) | LW / AM / SS | 22 June 1992 (aged 27) | (Italy) Chievo | 2015 | 2019 | 91 | 30 | |
Players transferred during the season
| 7 | Alessio Da Cruz | (Netherlands) | LW / RW / ST | 18 January 1997 (aged 22) | (Italy) Novara | 2018 | 2022 | 9 | 0 | |
| 8 | Alessandro Deiola | (Italy) | CM | 1 August 1995 (aged 23) | (Italy) Cagliari | 2018 | 2019 | 10 | 0 | Loan |
| 10 | Amato Ciciretti | (Italy) | RW / AM | 31 December 1993 (aged 25) | (Italy) Napoli | 2018 | 2019 | 14 | 1 | Loan |
| 19 | Cristian Galano | (Italy) | RW / LW / AM | 1 April 1991 (aged 28) | (Italy) Bari | 2018 | 2021 | 0 | 0 | Out on loan |
| 20 | Antonio Di Gaudio | (Italy) | LW | 16 August 1989 (aged 29) | (Italy) Carpi | 2017 | 2020 | 48 | 5 | |
| 59 | Valerio Di Cesare | (Italy) | CB | 23 May 1983 (aged 36) | (Italy) Bari | 2017 | 2019 | 32 | 2 | |
| 61 | Luigi Scaglia | (Italy) | LB | 23 November 1986 (aged 32) | (Italy) Foggia | 2017 | 2019 | 24 | 0 | |
| 71 | Giuseppe Carriero | (Italy) | CM | 4 September 1997 (aged 21) | (Italy) Casertana | 2018 | – | 0 | 0 | |

a. Banned until 31 December 2018 for attempted match-fixing.

== Transfers ==
=== In ===
| Date | Pos. | Player | Age | Moving from | Fee | Notes | Source |
|---|---|---|---|---|---|---|---|
| 30 June 2018 | MF | (Slovenia) Leo Štulac | 23 | (Italy) Venezia | €1.3M | €1.3M + €350,000 in bonuses | |
| 1 July 2018 | DF | (Italy) Riccardo Gagliolo | 28 | (Italy) Carpi | €1.2M | Option to buy exercised | |
| 1 July 2018 | DF | (Italy) Luigi Scaglia | 36 | (Italy) Foggia | Free | Loan return | |
| 12 July 2018 | DF | (Portugal) Bruno Alves | 36 | (Scotland) Rangers | Free | | |
| 14 July 2018 | DF | (Italy) Massimo Gobbi | 37 | Unattached | Free | | |
| 18 July 2018 | FW | (Italy) Cristian Galano | 27 | Unattached | Free | | |
| 18 July 2018 | MF | (Italy) Luca Rigoni | 33 | (Italy) Genoa | Free | | |
| 7 August 2018 | FW | (France) Jonathan Biabiany | 30 | (Italy) Internazionale | Undisclosed | | |
| 17 August 2018 | FW | (Ivory Coast) Gervinho | 31 | Unattached | Free | | |
| 15 January 2019 | MF | (Slovakia) Juraj Kucka | 31 | (Turkey) Trabzonspor | Undisclosed | | |

==== Loans in ====
| Date | Pos. | Player | Age | Moving from | Fee | Notes | Source |
|---|---|---|---|---|---|---|---|
| 9 July 2018 | GK | (Italy) Luigi Sepe | 27 | (Italy) Napoli | Loan | Loan with an option to buy and counter-option | |
| 26 July 2018 | MF | (Italy) Amato Ciciretti | 24 | (Italy) Napoli | Loan | | |
| 7 August 2018 | DF | (Italy) Alessandro Bastoni | 19 | (Italy) Internazionale | Loan | | |
| 7 August 2018 | DF | (Italy) Federico Dimarco | 20 | (Italy) Internazionale | Loan | Loan with an option to buy and counter-option | |
| 7 August 2018 | DF | (Chile) Francisco Sierralta | 21 | (Italy) Udinese | Loan | | |
| 14 August 2018 | MF | (Italy) Alberto Grassi | 23 | (Italy) Napoli | Loan | | |
| 14 August 2018 | FW | (Italy) Roberto Inglese | 26 | (Italy) Napoli | Loan | Loan with an option to buy | |
| 17 August 2018 | MF | (Italy) Alessandro Deiola | 23 | (Italy) Cagliari | Loan | | |
| 17 August 2018 | MF | (Italy) Mattia Sprocati | 25 | (Italy) Lazio | Loan | Loan with an option to buy | |

=== Out ===
| Date | Pos. | Player | Age | Moving to | Fee | Notes | Source |
|---|---|---|---|---|---|---|---|
| 1 July 2018 | DF | (Italy) Alessandro Lucarelli | 40 | Retired | | | |

==== Loans out ====
| Date | Pos. | Player | Age | Moving to | Fee | Notes | Source |

== Competitions ==
=== Serie A ===
==== League table ====
| Pos | Team | Pld | W | D | L | GF | GA | GD | Pts |
|---|---|---|---|---|---|---|---|---|---|
| 12 | Udinese | 38 | 11 | 10 | 17 | 39 | 53 | −14 | 43 |
| 13 | SPAL | 38 | 11 | 9 | 18 | 44 | 56 | −12 | 42 |
| 14 | Parma | 38 | 10 | 11 | 17 | 41 | 61 | −20 | 41 (Note: Positions determined by head-to-head points: Parma: 9 pts; Cagliari: 7 pts; Fiorentina: 1 pt.) |
| 15 | Cagliari | 38 | 10 | 11 | 17 | 36 | 54 | −18 | 41 |
| 16 | Fiorentina | 38 | 8 | 17 | 13 | 47 | 45 | +2 | 41 |

Source: Serie A, Soccerway
Rules for classification: 1) Points; 2) Head-to-head points; 3) Head-to-head goal difference; 4) Goal difference; 5) Goals scored; 6) Draw. (Note: Head-to-head record is used only after all the matches between the teams in question have been played).

==== Results summary ====
| Overall | | | | | | | | Home | | | | | | Away | | | | | |
| Pld | W | D | L | GF | GA | GD | Pts | W | D | L | GF | GA | GD | W | D | L | GF | GA | GD |
|---|---|---|---|---|---|---|---|---|---|---|---|---|---|---|---|---|---|---|---|
| 38 | 10 | 11 | 17 | 41 | 61 | −20 | 41 | 5 | 7 | 7 | 18 | 25 | −7 | 5 | 4 | 10 | 23 | 36 | −13 |

Last updated: 26 May 2019.
Source: Competitive matches

==== Results by round ====
| Round | 1 | 2 | 3 | 4 | 5 | 6 | 7 | 8 | 9 | 10 | 11 | 12 | 13 | 14 | 15 | 16 | 17 | 18 | 19 | 20 | 21 | 22 | 23 | 24 | 25 | 26 | 27 | 28 | 29 | 30 | 31 | 32 | 33 | 34 | 35 | 36 | 37 | 38 |
|---|---|---|---|---|---|---|---|---|---|---|---|---|---|---|---|---|---|---|---|---|---|---|---|---|---|---|---|---|---|---|---|---|---|---|---|---|---|---|
| Ground | H | A | H | A | H | A | H | A | H | A | H | A | H | A | H | A | H | A | H | A | H | A | H | A | H | A | H | A | H | A | H | A | H | A | H | A | H | A |
| Result | D | L | L | W | W | L | W | W | L | L | D | W | W | L | D | L | D | W | L | W | L | D | L | L | L | D | W | L | L | L | D | D | D | D | D | L | W | L |
| Position | 8 | 12 | 18 | 17 | 10 | 12 | 10 | 9 | 11 | 13 | 12 | 11 | 6 | 9 | 10 | 12 | 12 | 12 | 12 | 9 | 12 | 12 | 12 | 12 | 13 | 13 | 11 | 12 | 12 | 14 | 14 | 14 | 14 | 15 | 14 | 15 | 14 | 14 |

Updated to match(es) played on 26 May 2019. Source: Competitive matches
A = Away; H = Home; W = Win; D = Draw; L = Loss

==== Matches ====
| 19 August 2018 1 | Parma | 2–2 | Udinese | Parma |
| 20:30 CEST (UTC+02:00) | Inglese 43'; Barillà 59'; Gobbi (yellow card) 84'; Iacoponi (yellow card) 86' | Report | Lasagna (yellow card) 57'; De Paul 65' (pen.); Fofana 69', (yellow card) 90+3' | Stadium: Stadio Ennio Tardini; Attendance: 13,141; Referee: Gianpaolo Calvarese |

| 26 August 2018 2 | SPAL | 1–0 | Parma | Bologna |
| 18:00 CEST (UTC+02:00) | Kurtić (yellow card) 6'; Antenucci 49'; Schiattarella (yellow card) 61'; Lazzari (yellow card) 70'; Felipe (yellow card) 71'; Petagna (yellow card) 72' | Report | Štulac (yellow card) 69'; Barillà (yellow card) 73' | Stadium: Stadio Renato Dall'Ara; Attendance: 7,000; Referee: Daniele Orsato |
Note: Match played at the Stadio Renato Dall'Ara due to ongoing construction work on the Stadio Paolo Mazza.

| 1 September 2018 3 | Parma | 1–2 | Juventus | Parma |
| 20:30 CEST (UTC+02:00) | Gervinho 33'; Rigoni (yellow card) 45+2' | Report | Mandžukić 2'; Pjanić (yellow card) 13'; Bernardeschi (yellow card) 40'; Matuidi 58'; Cuadrado (yellow card) 90' | Stadium: Stadio Ennio Tardini; Attendance: 20,814; Referee: Daniele Doveri |

| 15 September 2018 4 | Internazionale | 0–1 | Parma | Milan |
| 15:00 CEST (UTC+02:00) | Brozović (yellow card) 31'; D'Ambrosio (yellow card) 67' | Report | Štulac (yellow card) 24'; Dimarco 79', (yellow card) 80' | Stadium: San Siro; Attendance: 59,648; Referee: Gianluca Manganello |

| 22 September 2018 5 | Parma | 2–0 | Cagliari | Parma |
| 15:00 CEST (UTC+02:00) | Inglese 20'; Gagliolo (yellow card) 32'; Gervinho 47'; Barillà (yellow card) 69' | Report | Sau (yellow card) 34' | Stadium: Stadio Ennio Tardini; Attendance: 14,852; Referee: Gianpaolo Calvarese |

| 26 September 2018 6 | Napoli | 3–0 | Parma | Naples |
| 21:00 CEST (UTC+02:00) | Insigne 4'; Milik 47', 85' | Report | Štulac (yellow card) 33'; Alves (yellow card) 50'; Barillà (yellow card) 89' | Stadium: Stadio San Paolo; Attendance: 29,354; Referee: Daniele Doveri |

| 30 September 2018 7 | Parma | 1–0 | Empoli | Parma |
| 18:00 CEST (UTC+02:00) | Gervinho 33'; Iacoponi (yellow card) 35'; Barillà (yellow card) 82' | Report | Rasmussen (yellow card) 23'; Di Lorenzo (yellow card) 31'; Traorè (yellow card) 87' | Stadium: Stadio Ennio Tardini; Attendance: 14,584; Referee: Luca Pairetto |

| 7 October 2018 8 | Genoa | 1–3 | Parma | Genoa |
| 12:30 CEST (UTC+02:00) | Piątek 6', (yellow card) 50' | Report | Rigoni 16'; Siligardi 26'; Ceravolo 30'; Alves (yellow card) 51' | Stadium: Stadio Luigi Ferraris; Attendance: 20,511; Referee: Daniele Chiffi |

| 21 October 2018 9 | Parma | 0–2 | Lazio | Parma |
| 15:00 CEST (UTC+02:00) | Gobbi (yellow card) 32'; Siligardi (yellow card) 47' | Report | Lucas (yellow card) 30'; Luis Alberto (yellow card) 50'; Immobile 81' (pen.); Milinković-Savić (yellow card) 88'; Correa 90+4' | Stadium: Stadio Ennio Tardini; Attendance: 18,969; Referee: Michael Fabbri |

| 27 October 2018 10 | Atalanta | 3–0 | Parma | Bergamo |
| 15:00 CEST (UTC+02:00) | Gagliolo 55' (o.g.); Palomino 72'; Mancini 80' | Report | Barillà (yellow card) 23'; Gagliolo (yellow card) 61' | Stadium: Stadio Atleti Azzurri d'Italia; Attendance: 18,152; Referee: Rosario Abisso |

| 4 November 2018 11 | Parma | 0–0 | Frosinone | Parma |
| 15:00 CET (UTC+01:00) | Štulac (red card) 61'; Alves (yellow card) 71' | Report | Maiello (yellow card) 32'; Chibsah (yellow card) 38'; Goldaniga (yellow card) 71'; Gori (yellow card) 78' | Stadium: Stadio Ennio Tardini; Attendance: 14,004; Referee: Gianluca Manganiello |

| 10 November 2018 12 | Torino | 1–2 | Parma | Turin |
| 15:00 CET (UTC+01:00) | Baselli 37'; Rincón (yellow card) 82'; De Silvestri (yellow card) 86' | Report | Gervinho 9'; Inglese 25'; Barillà (yellow card) 27'; Sepe (yellow card) 45'; Gagliolo (yellow card) 85'; Deiola (yellow card) 89' | Stadium: Stadio Olimpico Grande Torino; Attendance: 17,431; Referee: Davide Massa |

| 25 November 2018 13 | Parma | 2–1 | Sassuolo | Parma |
| 12:30 CET (UTC+01:00) | Gervinho 6'; Inglese (yellow card) 20'; Alves 25', (yellow card) 36'; Bastoni (yellow card) 39' | Report | Babacar 36' (pen.); Duncan (yellow card) 62'; Marlon (yellow card) 82'; Ferrari (yellow card) 88'; Consigli (yellow card) 90+2' | Stadium: Stadio Ennio Tardini; Attendance: 14,354; Referee: Paolo Valeri |

| 2 December 2018 14 | Milan | 2–1 | Parma | Milan |
| 12:30 CET (UTC+01:00) | Cutrone 55'; Borini (yellow card) 70'; Kessié 71' (pen.); Castillejo (yellow card) 90+6' | Report | Inglese 49'; Biabiany (yellow card) 61'; Iacoponi (yellow card) 72' | Stadium: San Siro; Attendance: 53,275; Referee: Gianpaolo Calvarese |

| 9 December 2018 15 | Parma | 1–1 | Chievo | Parma |
| 15:00 CET (UTC+01:00) | Rigoni (yellow card) 7'; Barillà (yellow card) 27'; Gagliolo (yellow card) 31'; Alves 53'; Biabiany (yellow card) 58' | Report | Depaoli (yellow card) 4' (yellow-red card) 73'; Hetemaj (yellow card) 35'; Stępiński 46'; Tanasijević (yellow card) 90' | Stadium: Stadio Ennio Tardini; Attendance: 13,994; Referee: Federico La Penna |
Note: Strahinja Tanasijević was cautioned for dissent while a substitute.

| 16 December 2018 16 | Sampdoria | 2–0 | Parma | Genoa |
| 15:00 CET (UTC+01:00) | Murru (yellow card) 43'; Caprari 66'; Quagliarella 69'; Linetty (yellow card) 88' | Report | Scozzarella (yellow card) 61' | Stadium: Stadio Luigi Ferraris; Attendance: 19,000; Referee: Luca Pairetto |

| 22 December 2018 17 | Parma | 0–0 | Bologna | Parma |
| 15:00 CET (UTC+01:00) | Alves (yellow card) 21'; Siligardi (yellow card) 30'; Scozzarella (yellow card) 39' | Report | Nagy (yellow card) 31'; Mattiello (yellow card) 49'; Danilo (yellow card) 89' | Stadium: Stadio Ennio Tardini; Attendance: 15,058; Referee: Rosario Abisso |

| 26 December 2018 18 | Fiorentina | 0–1 | Parma | Florence |
| 15:00 CET (UTC+01:00) | Milenković (yellow card) 13'; Pezzella (yellow card) 31'; Laurini (yellow card) 40'; Vitor Hugo (red card) 65'; Gerson (yellow card) 88' | Report | Rigoni (yellow card) 18'; Inglese 45+2', (yellow card) 89'; Biabiany (yellow card) 74'; Deiola (yellow card) 90+1' | Stadium: Stadio Artemio Franchi; Attendance: 31,767; Referee: Michael Fabbri |

| 29 December 2018 19 | Parma | 0–2 | Roma | Parma |
| 15:00 CET (UTC+01:00) | Barillà (yellow card) 67' | Report | Kolarov (yellow card) 45+1'; Cristante 58'; Ünder 75' | Stadium: Stadio Ennio Tardini; Attendance: 17,997; Referee: Gianluca Manganiello |

| 19 January 2019 20 | Udinese | 1–2 | Parma | Udine |
| 18:00 CET (UTC+01:00) | Opoku (yellow card) 34'; Okaka (yellow card) 39', (goal) 50'; D'Alessandro (yellow card) 68' | Report | Inglese 11' (pen.); Deiola (yellow card) 55'; Gervinho 68' | Stadium: Dacia Arena; Attendance: 15,889; Referee: Paolo Mazzoleni |

| 27 January 2019 21 | Parma | 2–3 | SPAL | Parma |
| 15:00 CET (UTC+01:00) | Kucka (yellow card) 7'; Inglese 11' (pen.), 53'; Scozzarella (yellow card) 36' | Report | Fares (yellow card) 34', (goal) 87'; Lazzari (yellow card) 57'; Valoti 70'; Petagna 75', (yellow card) 76'; Felipe (yellow card) 90+1' | Stadium: Stadio Ennio Tardini; Attendance: 15,297; Referee: Rosario Abisso |

| 2 February 2019 22 | Juventus | 3–3 | Parma | Turin |
| 20:30 CET (UTC+01:00) | Ronaldo 36', 66'; Rugani 62'; Can (yellow card) 90+1' | Report | Barillà (yellow card) 26', (goal) 64'; Scozzarella (yellow card) 28'; Gervinho 74', 90+3' | Stadium: Allianz Stadium; Attendance: 39,548; Referee: Piero Giacomelli |

| 9 February 2019 23 | Parma | 0–1 | Internazionale | Parma |
| 20:30 CET (UTC+01:00) | Gagliolo (yellow card) 61'; Biabiany (yellow card) 89' | Report | Vecino (yellow card) 37'; Martínez 79'; Nainggolan (yellow card) 85' | Stadium: Stadio Ennio Tardini; Attendance: 18,155; Referee: Massimiliano Irrati |

| 16 February 2019 24 | Cagliari | 2–1 | Parma | Cagliari |
| 18:00 CET (UTC+01:00) | Cigarini (yellow card) 36'; Deiola (yellow card) 52'; Pavoletti 66', 85', (yellow card) 78'; João Pedro (yellow card) 90' (yellow-red card) 90' | Report | Kucka 40'; Bastoni (yellow card) 46' | Stadium: Sardegna Arena; Attendance: 16,119; Referee: Gianluca Manganiello |

| 24 February 2019 25 | Parma | 0–4 | Napoli | Parma |
| 18:00 CET (UTC+01:00) | Rigoni (yellow card) 28'; Gagliolo (yellow card) 85' | Report | Zieliński 19'; Milik 36', 73', (yellow card) 38'; Ounas 82' | Stadium: Stadio Ennio Tardini; Attendance: 18,478; Referee: Daniele Chiffi |

| 2 March 2019 26 | Empoli | 3–3 | Parma | Empoli |
| 15:00 CET (UTC+01:00) | Drągowski (yellow card) 13'; Dell'Orco 19'; Caputo 59' (pen.); Alves 90+1' (o.g.) | Report | Gervinho 13', (yellow card) 79'; Rigoni 45+1'; Kucka (yellow card) 62'; Alves 82'; Iacoponi (yellow card) 90+7' | Stadium: Stadio Carlo Castellani; Attendance: 8,404; Referee: Marco Di Bello |

| 9 March 2019 27 | Parma | 1–0 | Genoa | Parma |
| 18:00 CET (UTC+01:00) | Scozzarella (yellow card) 68'; Kucka 78'; Alves (yellow card) 85' | Report | Radovanović (yellow card) 43' | Stadium: Stadio Ennio Tardini; Attendance: 14,787; Referee: Juan Luca Sacchi |

| 17 March 2019 28 | Lazio | 4–1 | Parma | Rome |
| 15:00 CET (UTC+01:00) | Marušić 22'; Luis Alberto 26' (pen.), 38'; Lulić 44' | Report | Inglese (yellow card) 52'; Alves (yellow card) 63'; Sprocati 77' | Stadium: Stadio Olimpico; Attendance: 40,000; Referee: Luca Banti |

| 31 March 2019 29 | Parma | 1–3 | Atalanta | Parma |
| 12:30 CEST (UTC+02:00) | Gervinho 8'; Scozzarella (yellow card) 76' | Report | Pašalić 24'; Castagne (yellow card) 58'; Zapata 75', 90+4' | Stadium: Stadio Ennio Tardini; Attendance: 18,168; Referee: Daniele Chiffi |

| 3 April 2019 30 | Frosinone | 3–2 | Parma | Frosinone |
| 21:00 CEST (UTC+02:00) | Pinamonti 13'; Brighenti (yellow card) 25'; Valzania (yellow card) 27', (goal) 45+2'; Capuano (yellow card) 44'; Ciofani 90+13' (pen.) | Report | Sierralta (yellow card) 12'; Barillà 18'; Gazzola (yellow card) 41'; Ceravolo 58' (pen.), (yellow card) 59'; Gobbi (yellow card) 90+4' | Stadium: Stadio Benito Stirpe; Attendance: 12,285; Referee: Gianluca Manganiello |

| 6 April 2019 31 | Parma | 0–0 | Torino | Parma |
| 15:00 CEST (UTC+02:00) | Gagliolo (yellow card) 22'; Gazzola (yellow card) 50'; Sierralta (yellow card) 77'; Kucka (yellow card) 90' | Report | Rincón (yellow card) 3'; Belotti (yellow card) 57'; Ansaldi (yellow card) 60'; Zaza (yellow card) 75'; Izzo (yellow card) 87' | Stadium: Stadio Ennio Tardini; Attendance: 16,924; Referee: Daniele Doveri |

| 14 April 2019 32 | Sassuolo | 0–0 | Parma | Reggio Emilia |
| 15:00 CEST (UTC+02:00) | Matri (yellow card) 53'; Ferrari (yellow card) 86'; Sensi (yellow card) 90+3' | Report | Scozzarella (yellow card) 75'; Dimarco (yellow card) 90' | Stadium: Mapei Stadium – Città del Tricolore; Attendance: 12,538; Referee: Marco Piccinini |

| 20 April 2019 33 | Parma | 1–1 | Milan | Parma |
| 12:30 CEST (UTC+02:00) | Alves 87' | Report | Castillejo 69'; Biglia (yellow card) 83' | Stadium: Stadio Ennio Tardini; Attendance: 20,018; Referee: Paolo Valeri |

| 28 April 2019 34 | Chievo | 1–1 | Parma | Verona |
| 15:00 CEST (UTC+02:00) | Cesar (yellow card) 32'; Léris (yellow card) 37'; Meggiorini 66'; Barba (yellow card) 72' | Report | Kucka 38'; Gazzola (yellow card) 67'; Alves (yellow card) 80'; Gervinho (yellow card) 90+3' | Stadium: Stadio Marc'Antonio Bentegodi; Attendance: 11,200; Referee: Juan Luca Sacchi |

| 5 May 2019 35 | Parma | 3–3 | Sampdoria | Parma |
| 15:00 CEST (UTC+02:00) | Gazzola 2'; Barillà (yellow card) 23'; Dimarco (yellow card) 27'; Kucka (yellow card) 60' (yellow-red card) 90+1', (goal) 67' (pen.); Bastoni 71' | Report | Colley (yellow card) 4' (yellow-red card) 88'; Quagliarella 28' (pen.), 61'; Defrel 38'; Barreto (yellow card) 80' | Stadium: Stadio Ennio Tardini; Attendance: 16,992; Referee: Michael Fabbri |

| 13 May 2019 36 | Bologna | 4–1 | Parma | Bologna |
| 19:00 CEST (UTC+02:00) | Soriano (yellow card) 48'; Orsolini 52'; Sepe 59' (o.g.); Lyanco 72'; Sierralta 84' (o.g.) | Report | Dimarco (yellow card) 33'; Rigoni (yellow card) 34'; Gervinho (yellow card) 58'; Alves (yellow card) 61' (yellow-red card) 62'; Scozzarella (yellow card) 71'; Inglese 81' | Stadium: Stadio Renato Dall'Ara; Attendance: 20,656; Referee: Luca Pairetto |

| 19 May 2019 37 | Parma | 1–0 | Fiorentina | Parma |
| 15:00 CEST (UTC+02:00) | Gerson 80' (o.g.) | Report | Benassi (yellow card) 90+4' | Stadium: Stadio Ennio Tardini; Attendance: 17,333; Referee: Piero Giacomelli |

| 26 May 2019 38 | Roma | 2–1 | Parma | Rome |
| 20:30 CEST (UTC+02:00) | Gagliolo 35' (o.g.); Perotti (yellow card) 41', (goal) 89'; Lo. Pellegrini (yellow card) 78' | Report | Kucka (yellow card) 38'; Gervinho 86' | Stadium: Stadio Olimpico; Attendance: 62,304; Referee: Paolo Mazzoleni |

=== Coppa Italia ===
| 12 August 2018 Third round | Parma | 0–1 | Pisa | Parma |
| 20:30 CEST (UTC+02:00) | Gagliolo (yellow card) 79' | Report | Zammarini 28' | Stadium: Stadio Ennio Tardini; Attendance: 5,497; Referee: Marco Serra |

== Statistics ==
=== Appearances and goals ===
| No. | Pos | Nat | Player | Total | | Serie A | | Coppa Italia | |
| No. | Pos | Nat | Player | Apps | Goals | Apps | Goals | Apps | Goals |
Goalkeepers
| 1 | GK | (Italy) ITA | Pierluigi Frattali | 1 | 0 | 1 | 0 | 0 | 0 |
| 55 | GK | (Italy) ITA | Luigi Sepe | 38 | 0 | 37 | 0 | 1 | 0 |
Defenders
| 2 | DF | (Italy) ITA | Simone Iacoponi | 39 | 0 | 38 | 0 | 1 | 0 |
| 3 | DF | (Italy) ITA | Federico Dimarco | 14 | 1 | 10+3 | 1 | 1 | 0 |
| 13 | DF | (Chile) CHI | Francisco Sierralta | 6 | 0 | 2+4 | 0 | 0 | 0 |
| 18 | DF | (Italy) ITA | Massimo Gobbi | 17 | 0 | 13+3 | 0 | 1 | 0 |
| 22 | DF | (Portugal) POR | Bruno Alves | 33 | 4 | 33 | 4 | 0 | 0 |
| 23 | DF | (Italy) ITA | Marcello Gazzola | 20 | 1 | 9+11 | 1 | 0 | 0 |
| 28 | DF | (Italy) ITA | Riccardo Gagliolo | 35 | 0 | 34 | 0 | 1 | 0 |
| 95 | DF | (Italy) ITA | Alessandro Bastoni | 24 | 1 | 18+6 | 1 | 0 | 0 |
Midfielders
| 5 | MF | (Slovenia) SVN | Leo Štulac | 27 | 0 | 17+9 | 0 | 1 | 0 |
| 8 | MF | (Senegal) SEN | Abdou Diakhaté | 1 | 0 | 0+1 | 0 | 0 | 0 |
| 14 | MF | (Equatorial Guinea) EQG | Pepín | 2 | 0 | 1+1 | 0 | 0 | 0 |
| 17 | MF | (Italy) ITA | Antonino Barillà | 32 | 3 | 30+1 | 3 | 1 | 0 |
| 21 | MF | (Italy) ITA | Matteo Scozzarella | 22 | 0 | 17+5 | 0 | 0 | 0 |
| 32 | MF | (Italy) ITA | Luca Rigoni | 24 | 2 | 20+3 | 2 | 1 | 0 |
| 33 | MF | (Italy) ITA | Jacopo Dezi | 1 | 0 | 1 | 0 | 0 | 0 |
| 70 | MF | (Italy) ITA | Antonio Junior Vacca | 0 | 0 | 0 | 0 | 0 | 0 |
| 87 | MF | (Slovakia) SVK | Juraj Kucka | 18 | 4 | 17+1 | 4 | 0 | 0 |
| 88 | MF | (Italy) ITA | Alberto Grassi | 7 | 0 | 5+2 | 0 | 0 | 0 |
Forwards
| 9 | FW | (Italy) ITA | Fabio Ceravolo | 26 | 2 | 12+13 | 2 | 1 | 0 |
| 10 | FW | (Uruguay) URU | Nicolás Schiappacasse | 3 | 0 | 1+2 | 0 | 0 | 0 |
| 26 | FW | (Italy) ITA | Luca Siligardi | 29 | 1 | 19+10 | 1 | 0 | 0 |
| 27 | FW | (Ivory Coast) CIV | Gervinho | 30 | 11 | 27+3 | 11 | 0 | 0 |
| 45 | FW | (Italy) ITA | Roberto Inglese | 25 | 9 | 23+2 | 9 | 0 | 0 |
| 77 | FW | (France) FRA | Jonathan Biabiany | 19 | 0 | 12+6 | 0 | 0+1 | 0 |
| 93 | FW | (Italy) ITA | Mattia Sprocati | 16 | 1 | 5+11 | 1 | 0 | 0 |
Players transferred out during the season
| 7 | FW | (Netherlands) NED | Alessio Da Cruz | 4 | 0 | 1+2 | 0 | 0+1 | 0 |
| 8 | MF | (Italy) ITA | Alessandro Deiola | 10 | 0 | 5+5 | 0 | 0 | 0 |
| 10 | FW | (Italy) ITA | Amato Ciciretti | 6 | 0 | 1+5 | 0 | 0 | 0 |
| 11 | MF | (Italy) ITA | Gianni Munari | 1 | 0 | 0+1 | 0 | 0 | 0 |
| 19 | FW | (Italy) ITA | Cristian Galano | 1 | 0 | 0 | 0 | 1 | 0 |
| 20 | MF | (Italy) ITA | Antonio Di Gaudio | 13 | 0 | 9+3 | 0 | 1 | 0 |
| 72 | FW | (Italy) ITA | Emanuele Calaiò | 0 | 0 | 0 | 0 | 0 | 0 |
| 99 | FW | (Senegal) SEN | Yves Baraye | 1 | 0 | 0 | 0 | 0+1 | 0 |

Last updated: 26 May 2019
Source: Competitions

=== Goalscorers ===
| Rank | No. | Pos | Nat | Name | Serie A | Coppa Italia | Total |
|---|---|---|---|---|---|---|---|
| 1 | 27 | FW | (Ivory Coast) | Gervinho | 11 | 0 | 11 |
| 2 | 45 | FW | (Italy) | Roberto Inglese | 9 | 0 | 9 |
| 3 | 22 | DF | (Portugal) | Bruno Alves | 4 | 0 | 4 |
| 3 | 87 | MF | (Slovakia) | Juraj Kucka | 4 | 0 | 4 |
| 5 | 17 | MF | (Italy) | Antonino Barillà | 3 | 0 | 3 |
| 6 | 9 | FW | (Italy) | Fabio Ceravolo | 2 | 0 | 2 |
| 6 | 32 | MF | (Italy) | Luca Rigoni | 2 | 0 | 2 |
| 8 | 3 | DF | (Italy) | Federico Dimarco | 1 | 0 | 1 |
| 8 | 23 | DF | (Italy) | Marcello Gazzola | 1 | 0 | 1 |
| 8 | 26 | FW | (Italy) | Luca Siligardi | 1 | 0 | 1 |
| 8 | 93 | FW | (Italy) | Mattia Sprocati | 1 | 0 | 1 |
| 8 | 95 | DF | (Italy) | Alessandro Bastoni | 1 | 0 | 1 |
| Own goal | | | | | 1 | 0 | 1 |
| Totals | | | | | 41 | 0 | 41 |

Last updated: 26 May 2019

=== Clean sheets ===
| Rank | No. | Pos | Nat | Name | Serie A | Coppa Italia | Total |
|---|---|---|---|---|---|---|---|
| 1 | 55 | GK | (Italy) | Luigi Sepe | 10 | 0 | 10 |
| Totals | | | | | 10 | 0 | 10 |

Last updated: 26 May 2019

=== Disciplinary record ===
| No. | Pos | Nat | Name | Serie A | | | Coppa Italia | | | Total | | |
| No. | Pos | Nat | Name | Booked | (yellow card) (yellow-red card) | Sent off (straight red) | Booked | (yellow card) (yellow-red card) | Sent off (straight red) | Booked | (yellow card) (yellow-red card) | Sent off (straight red) |
| 55 | GK | (Italy) | Luigi Sepe | 1 | 0 | 0 | 0 | 0 | 0 | 1 | 0 | 0 |
| 2 | DF | (Italy) | Simone Iacoponi | 4 | 0 | 0 | 0 | 0 | 0 | 4 | 0 | 0 |
| 3 | DF | (Italy) | Federico Dimarco | 4 | 0 | 0 | 0 | 0 | 0 | 4 | 0 | 0 |
| 13 | DF | (Chile) | Francisco Sierralta | 2 | 0 | 0 | 0 | 0 | 0 | 2 | 0 | 0 |
| 18 | DF | (Italy) | Massimo Gobbi | 3 | 0 | 0 | 0 | 0 | 0 | 3 | 0 | 0 |
| 22 | DF | (Portugal) | Bruno Alves | 8 | 1 | 0 | 0 | 0 | 0 | 8 | 1 | 0 |
| 23 | DF | (Italy) | Marcello Gazzola | 3 | 0 | 0 | 0 | 0 | 0 | 3 | 0 | 0 |
| 28 | DF | (Italy) | Riccardo Gagliolo | 7 | 0 | 0 | 1 | 0 | 0 | 8 | 0 | 0 |
| 95 | DF | (Italy) | Alessandro Bastoni | 2 | 0 | 0 | 0 | 0 | 0 | 2 | 0 | 0 |
| 5 | MF | (Slovenia) | Leo Štulac | 3 | 0 | 1 | 0 | 0 | 0 | 3 | 0 | 1 |
| 8 | MF | (Italy) | Alessandro Deiola | 3 | 0 | 0 | 0 | 0 | 0 | 3 | 0 | 0 |
| 17 | MF | (Italy) | Antonino Barillà | 10 | 0 | 0 | 0 | 0 | 0 | 10 | 0 | 0 |
| 21 | MF | (Italy) | Matteo Scozzarella | 8 | 0 | 0 | 0 | 0 | 0 | 8 | 0 | 0 |
| 32 | MF | (Italy) | Luca Rigoni | 5 | 0 | 0 | 0 | 0 | 0 | 5 | 0 | 0 |
| 87 | MF | (Slovakia) | Juraj Kucka | 4 | 1 | 0 | 0 | 0 | 0 | 4 | 1 | 0 |
| 9 | FW | (Italy) | Fabio Ceravolo | 1 | 0 | 0 | 0 | 0 | 0 | 1 | 0 | 0 |
| 26 | FW | (Italy) | Luca Siligardi | 2 | 0 | 0 | 0 | 0 | 0 | 2 | 0 | 0 |
| 27 | FW | (Ivory Coast) | Gervinho | 3 | 0 | 0 | 0 | 0 | 0 | 3 | 0 | 0 |
| 45 | FW | (Italy) | Roberto Inglese | 3 | 0 | 0 | 0 | 0 | 0 | 3 | 0 | 0 |
| 77 | FW | (France) | Jonathan Biabiany | 4 | 0 | 0 | 0 | 0 | 0 | 4 | 0 | 0 |
| Totals | | | | 80 | 2 | 1 | 1 | 0 | 0 | 81 | 2 | 1 |

Last updated: 26 May 2019
