= Simone Iacoponi =

Italian footballer

Personal information
- Date of birth: 30 April 1987 (age 39)
- Place of birth: Pontedera, Italy
- Height: 1.80 m (5 ft 11 in)
- Position: Right back

Team information
- Current team: Aglianese
- Number: 2

Youth career
- Empoli

Senior career*
Years	Team	Apps	(Gls)
2006–2012	Empoli	7	(0)
2008–2009	→ Monza (loan)	2	(0)
2009	→ Cuoiocappiano (loan)	15	(0)
2010–2011	→ Foligno (loan)	29	(1)
2011–2012	→ Südtirol (loan)	31	(1)
2012–2013	Südtirol	45	(5)
2014–2017	Virtus Entella	107	(6)
2017–2022	Parma	146	(4)
2022	Teramo	11	(0)
2022–2023	Roma City	18	(0)
2023–	Aglianese	1	(0)
- * Club domestic league appearances and goals as of 8 October 2023

Simone Iacoponi (born 30 April 1987) is an Italian professional footballer who plays as a right back for Serie D club Aglianese.

== Career ==
Iacoponi made his professional debut for Empoli on 20 May 2007 in a 3–3 draw with Reggina.

On 11 February 2022, Iacoponi signed with Teramo until 30 June 2024.

On 17 December 2022, after having been without a contract since July following Teramo's exclusion from Italian football, Iacoponi signed for Serie D club Roma City.

== Career statistics ==
As of match played 27 March 2022

Appearances and goals by club, season and competition
Club	Season	League			National Cup		Continental		Other		Total	
Club	Season	Division	Apps	Goals	Apps	Goals	Apps	Goals	Apps	Goals	Apps	Goals
Empoli	2006–07	Serie A	1	0	4	1	—		—		5	1
Empoli	2007–08	Serie B	0	0	0	0	1 (Note: Appearance(s) in UEFA Cup)	0	—		1	0
Empoli	2009–10	Serie B	6	0	1	0	—		—		7	0
Empoli	Total		7	0	5	0	1	0	0	0	13	1
Monza (loan)	2008–09	Lega Pro	3	1	2	0	—		—		5	1
Cuoiocappiano (loan)	2008–09	Lega Pro 2	13	0	—		—		2 (Note: Appearance(s) in Relegation Playoffs)	0	15	0
Foligno (loan)	2010–11	Lega Pro	29	1	0	0	—		2	0	31	1
Südtirol (loan)	2011–12	Lega Pro	31	1	—		—		—		31	1
Südtirol	2012–13	Lega Pro	31	4	0	0	—		2 (Note: Appearance(s) in Promotion Playoffs)	1	33	5
Südtirol	2013–14	Lega Pro	15	1	2	0	—		—		17	1
Südtirol	Total		46	5	2	0	0	0	2	1	50	6
Virtus Entella	2013–14	Lega Pro	13	1	—		—		—		13	1
Virtus Entella	2014–15	Serie B	40	2	2	0	—		2	0	44	2
Virtus Entella	2015–16	Serie B	29	2	—		—		—		29	2
Virtus Entella	2016–17	Serie B	23	1	2	0	—		—		25	1
Virtus Entella	Total		105	6	4	0	0	0	2	0	111	6
Parma	2016–17	Lega Pro	15	1	—		—		6	0	21	1
Parma	2017–18	Serie B	40	1	1	0	—		—		41	1
Parma	2018–19	Serie A	38	0	1	0	—		—		39	0
Parma	2019–20	Serie A	36	2	2	1	—		—		38	3
Parma	2020–21	Serie A	16	0	2	0	—		—		18	0
Parma	2021–22	Serie B	0	0	0	0	—		—		0	0
Parma	Total		145	4	6	1	0	0	6	0	157	5
Teramo	2021–22	Serie C	9	0	—		—		—		9	0
Career total			388	18	19	2	1	0	14	1	422	21
