= Giorno =

Giorno (Italian for “day”) is a surname. Notable people with the surname include:

- Francesco Giorno (born 1993), Italian footballer
- Guy Giorno (born 1965), Canadian lawyer and politician
- John Giorno (1936–2019), American poet and performance artist

== Fictional character ==
- Giorno Giovanna, a JoJo's Bizarre Adventure character appears in Part 5 of the series Golden Wind
