= Pasquale Mazzocchi =

Italian footballer (born 1995)

Personal information
- Date of birth: 27 July 1995 (age 31)
- Place of birth: Naples, Italy
- Height: 1.83 m (6 ft 0 in)
- Positions: Wing-back; full-back

Team information
- Current team: Venezia (on loan from Napoli)
- Number: 70

Youth career
- –2012: Benevento
- 2012–2014: Hellas Verona

Senior career*
Years	Team	Apps	(Gls)
2014–2015	Hellas Verona	0	(0)
2014	→ Bellaria Igea (loan)	8	(0)
2014–2015	→ Pro Piacenza (loan)	6	(0)
2015–2016	Rimini	23	(1)
2016–2018	Parma	61	(3)
2018–2020	Perugia	57	(1)
2020–2022	Venezia	52	(1)
2022	→ Salernitana (loan)	15	(0)
2022–2024	Salernitana	45	(2)
2024–	Napoli	46	(0)
2026–	→ Venezia (loan)	0	(0)

International career^{‡}
2022	Italy	1	(0)
- * Club domestic league appearances and goals as of 23:16, 24 May 2026 (UTC) ‡ National team caps and goals as of 15:30, 26 September 2022 (UTC)

Pasquale Mazzocchi (born 27 July 1995) is an Italian professional footballer who plays as a wing-back or full-back for Serie A club Venezia, on loan from Napoli.

== Club career ==
Mazzocchi made his Serie C debut for Pro Piacenza on 31 August 2014, in a game against Grosseto.

On 9 July 2018, Mazzocchi signed a four-year contract with Serie B club Perugia.

On 25 January 2022, Mazzocchi joined Serie A side Salernitana on loan from league rivals Venezia with a conditional obligation to buy.

On 5 January 2024, Mazzocchi joined reigning Serie A champions Napoli on a permanent deal, signing a three-and-a-half-year contract with the club. The transfer reportedly commanded a fee of about €3 million. Two days later, on his debut for the Partenopei, Mazzocchi received a straight red card just four minutes after coming on as a second-half substitute, following a VAR check, in a 3–0 league loss away to Torino. It was the third-fastest send-off for a debuting player in the history of Serie A, behind only Rolando Bianchi and Francesco Cassata.

On 31 August 2026, Mazzocchi returned to Venezia on loan from Napoli for the 2026–27 season, with an option to buy that would become an obligation under certain conditions.

== International career ==
On 17 September 2022, Mazzocchi received his first Italy national team callup, as manager Roberto Mancini named him to be part of the squad for the UEFA Nations League games against England and Hungary. He made his debut against Hungary in a 2–0 win.

== Career statistics ==
As of match played 24 May 2026

Appearances and goals by club, season and competition
Club	Season	League			National cup (Note: Includes Coppa Italia Serie C, Coppa Italia)		Europe		Other		Total	
Club	Season	Division	Apps	Goals	Apps	Goals	Apps	Goals	Apps	Goals	Apps	Goals
Bellaria Igea Marina (loan)	2013–14	Lega Pro 2	8	0	0	0	—		—		8	0
Pro Piacenza (loan)	2014–15	Lega Pro	5	0	1	0	—		—		6	0
Rimini	2014–15	Serie D	16	0	—		—		2 (Note: Appearance(s) in Poule Scudetto Serie D)	0	18	0
Rimini	2015–16	Lega Pro	7	1	2	0	—		—		9	1
Rimini	Total		23	1	2	0	—		2	0	27	1
Parma	2015–16	Serie D	13	3	—		—		2	0	15	3
Parma	2016–17	Lega Pro	24	0	1	0	—		6 (Note: Appearance(s) in Lega Pro play-off)	0	31	0
Parma	2017–18	Serie B	18	0	0	0	—		—		18	0
Parma	Total		55	3	1	0	—		8	0	64	3
Perugia	2018–19	Serie B	31	0	1	0	—		1 (Note: Appearance(s) in Serie B play-off)	0	33	0
Perugia	2019–20	Serie B	26	1	1	1	—		2 (Note: Appearance(s) in Serie B play-out)	0	29	2
Perugia	Total		57	1	2	1	—		3	0	62	2
Venezia	2020–21	Serie B	34	1	1	0	—		5	0	40	1
Venezia	2021–22	Serie A	18	0	2	0	—		—		20	0
Venezia	Total		52	1	3	0	—		5	0	60	1
Salernitana	2021–22	Serie A	15	0	0	0	—		—		15	0
Salernitana	2022–23	Serie A	27	2	0	0	—		—		27	2
Salernitana	2023–24	Serie A	18	0	1	0	—		—		19	0
Salernitana	Total		60	2	1	0	—		—		61	2
Napoli	2023–24	Serie A	10	0	—		0	0	2 (Note: Appearances in Supercoppa Italiana)	0	12	0
Napoli	2024–25	Serie A	20	0	2	0	—		—		22	0
Napoli	2025–26	Serie A	16	0	2	0	0	0	2	0	20	0
Napoli	Total		46	0	4	0	0	0	4	0	54	0
Career total			306	8	14	1	0	0	22	0	342	9

== Honours ==
Napoli

- Serie A: 2024–25
- Supercoppa Italiana: 2025–26
