= Matteo Scozzarella =

Italian footballer (born 1988)

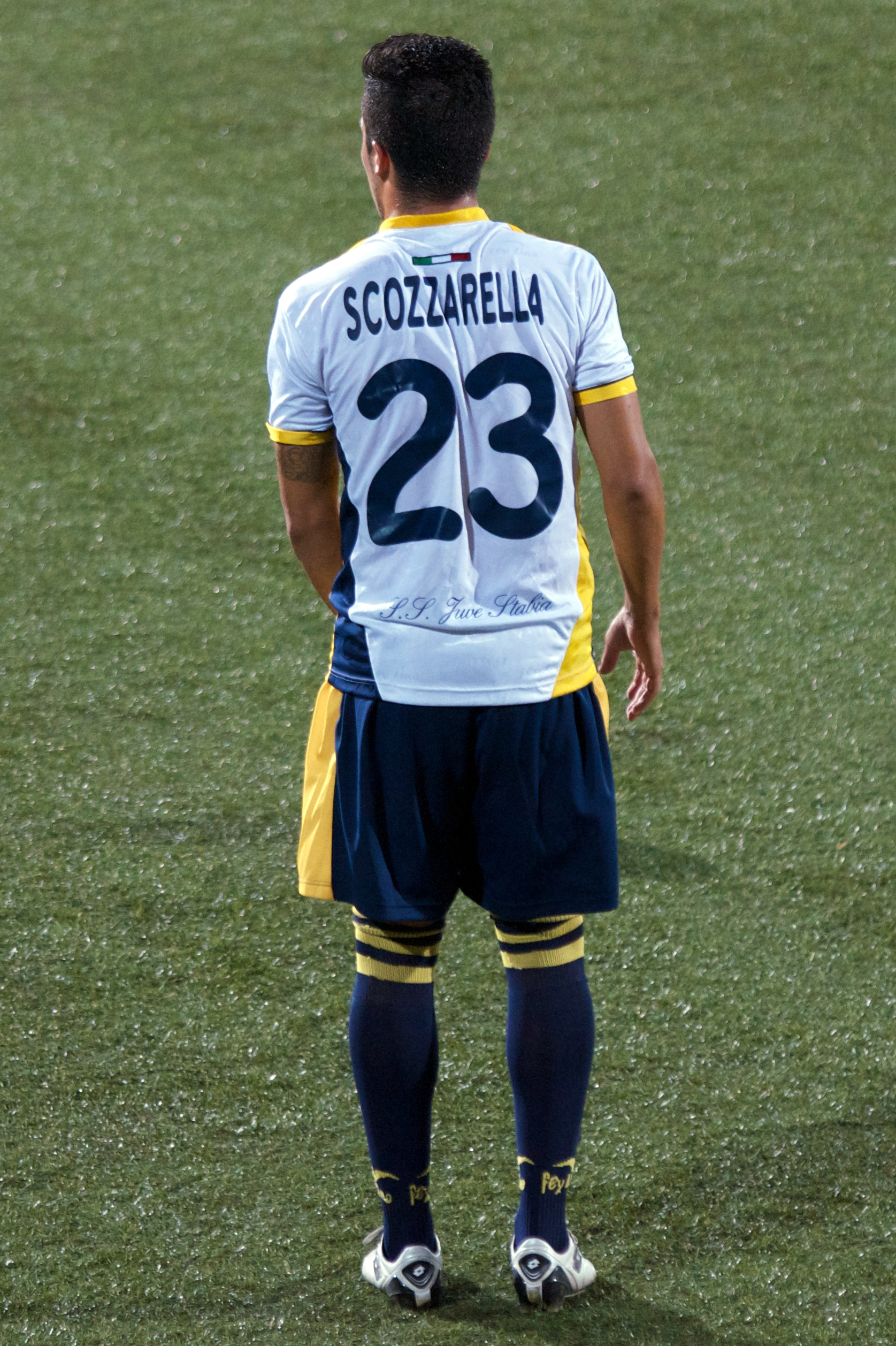
- Scozzarella with Juve Stabia in 2011

Personal information
- Date of birth: 5 June 1988 (age 38)
- Place of birth: Trieste, Italy
- Height: 1.70 m (5 ft 7 in)
- Position: Midfielder

Team information
- Current team: Cjarlins Muzane

Youth career
- San Giovanni Trieste
- –2005: Italia San Marco
- 2005–2007: Atalanta

Senior career*
Years	Team	Apps	(Gls)
2007–2011	Portogruaro	82	(6)
2011–2015	Atalanta	3	(0)
2011–2012	→ Juve Stabia (loan)	27	(4)
2013	→ Ternana (loan)	13	(0)
2013–2014	→ Juve Stabia (loan)	14	(1)
2014	→ Spezia (loan)	17	(1)
2014–2015	→ Trapani (loan)	21	(2)
2015–2017	Trapani	50	(3)
2017–2021	Parma	82	(0)
2021–2023	Monza	17	(0)
2023–	Cjarlins Muzane	0	(0)

International career
2005	Italy U17	2	(0)
2006	Italy U19	2	(0)
- * Club domestic league appearances and goals as of 00:03, 30 October 2023 (UTC)

Matteo Scozzarella (born 5 June 1988) is an Italian professional footballer who plays as a midfielder for Serie D club Cjarlins Muzane.

== Club career ==
=== Atalanta and Portogruaro ===
Scozzarella played youth football at San Giovanni Trieste and Italia San Marco, before joining Atalanta's youth setup in 2005. During the 2006–07 season he was integrated in the first squad, without however featuring in any match.

In summer of 2007, Scozzarella joined Lega Pro side Portogruaro in a co-ownership deal with Atalanta. In his first season, he played 18 league games and scored three goals. Portogruaro extended the co-ownership deal for a second season, where Scozzarella helped his side gain promotion to the 2010–11 Serie B.

=== Loan to Juve Stabia ===
Following the 2010–11 season, Scozzarella re-joined Atalanta, who sent him on loan to newly promoted Serie B team Juve Stabia on 17 July 2011. He made his debut on 14 August, against Sassuolo in the Coppa Italia. On 24 September, on matchday 6 of the league, Scozzarella scored his first goal for Juve Stabia, in a 3–2 win over Pescara.

=== Return to Atalanta and loans ===
After the loan, he returned to Atalanta, and played with the first team during the 2012–13 season. He made his Atalanta debut on 19 August 2012, in a 2–0 Coppa Italia win over Padova. His Serie A debut came on 30 September, coming on as a substitute in the 67th minute against Torino.

Following three Serie A games with Atalanta, all as a substitute, on 23 January 2013 Scozzarella joined Serie B club Ternana on loan until the end of the season. He made his league debut three days later, while his debut as a starter came on 2 February, in a goalless draw against Bari. Scozzarella played 13 games during his loan.

On 30 August 2013, Scozzarella returned to Juve Stabia on loan; he was loaned to Spezia on 31 January 2014, also in the Serie B. On 22 July 2014 Scozzarella was sent on loan to Trapani.

=== Trapani ===
On 14 July 2015, Scozzarella joined Trapani on a permanent deal, helping them finish in third place.

=== Parma ===
In January 2017, Scozzarella joined Lega Pro side Parma on a two-year deal. He helped Parma gain two consecutive promotions, to the Serie B and to the Serie A. On 29 October 2019, Scozzarella been given one-match ban for blasphemy during a Serie A match. He played 90 games in all competitions for Parma in four years.

=== Monza ===
On 5 January 2021, Scozzarella signed with newly-promoted Serie B side Monza on a six-month deal. He made his debut on 6 February, as a started in a 1–1 draw against Empoli. On 31 January 2023, his contract with Monza was terminated by mutual consent.

=== Later career ===
On 27 October 2023, Scozzarella joined Serie D club Cjarlins Muzane.

== Career statistics ==
As of match played 29 May 2022

Club	Season	League			Coppa Italia		Other		Total	
Club	Season	Division	Apps	Goals	Apps	Goals	Apps	Goals	Apps	Goals
Portogruaro	2007–08	Serie C2	18	3	0	0	3 (Note: Appearances in play-offs)	1	21	4
Portogruaro	2008–09	Lega Pro 1D	13	0	0	0	—		13	0
Portogruaro	2009–10	Lega Pro 1D	24	2	0	0	—		24	2
Portogruaro	2010–11	Serie B	27	1	1	0	—		28	1
Portogruaro	Total		82	6	1	0	3	1	86	7
Atalanta	2011–12	Serie A	—		—		—		0	0
Atalanta	2012–13	Serie A	3	0	2	0	—		5	0
Atalanta	2013–14	Serie A	—		—		—		0	0
Atalanta	2014–15	Serie A	—		—		—		0	0
Atalanta	Total		3	0	2	0	0	0	5	0
Juve Stabia (loan)	2011–12	Serie B	27	4	1	0	—		28	4
Ternana (loan)	2012–13	Serie B	13	0	0	0	—		13	0
Juve Stabia (loan)	2013–14	Serie B	14	1	0	0	—		14	1
Spezia (loan)	2013–14	Serie B	17	1	0	0	1	0	18	1
Trapani (loan)	2014–15	Serie B	21	2	0	0	—		21	2
Trapani	2015–16	Serie B	35	3	2	0	3	1	40	3
Trapani	2016–17	Serie B	15	0	1	0	—		16	0
Trapani	Total		50	3	3	0	3	1	56	3
Parma	2016–17	Lega Pro	17	0	0	0	4	0	21	0
Parma	2017–18	Serie B	24	0	1	0	—		25	0
Parma	2018–19	Serie A	22	0	0	0	—		22	0
Parma	2019–20	Serie A	16	0	1	0	—		17	0
Parma	2020–21	Serie A	3	0	2	0	—		5	0
Parma	Total		82	0	4	0	4	0	90	0
Monza	2020–21	Serie B	14	0	0	0	1	0	15	0
Monza	2021–22	Serie B	3	0	1	0	0	0	4	0
Monza	Total		17	0	1	0	1	0	19	0
Career total			326	17	12	0	12	2	350	19
