= Angelo D'Angelo =

Angelo D'Angelo may refer to:

- Angelo D'Angelo (footballer)
- Angelo D'Angelo (actor)
