= Dramane Konaté =

Ivorian footballer

Personal information
- Date of birth: 12 April 1994 (age 32)
- Place of birth: Bingerville, Ivory Coast
- Height: 1.84 m (6 ft 1/2 in)
- Position: Defender

Team information
- Current team: Manfredonia

Youth career
- –2013: Empoli

Senior career*
| Years | Team | Apps | (Gls) |
| 2013–2016 | Empoli | 0 | (0) |
| 2013–2014 | → Tuttocuoio (loan) | 30 | (4) |
| 2015–2016 | → Ancona (loan) | 28 | (0) |
| 2016–2018 | Pro Vercelli | 30 | (1) |
| 2018–2019 | Fano | 24 | (2) |
| 2019–2020 | Gubbio | 24 | (0) |
| 2020–2021 | Casertana | 17 | (1) |
| 2021–2022 | Paganese | 11 | (0) |
| 2022 | Aglianese | 10 | (1) |
| 2022–2023 | Seregno | 14 | (0) |
| 2023– | Manfredonia | 4 | (0) |
- * Club domestic league appearances and goals as of 1 October 2023

Dramane Konaté (born 12 April 1994) is an Ivorian football player who plays for Italian Serie D club Manfredonia.

== Club career ==
He made his professional debut in the Lega Pro for Tuttocuoio on 30 August 2014 in a game against Carrarese.

In June 2019, he joined Gubbio.

On 1 October 2020 he signed with Casertana.

On 13 December 2021, he moved to Serie C club Paganese.

On 23 August 2022, Konaté signed with Aglianese in Serie D.
