= Jacopo Dezi =

Italian footballer (born 1992)

Personal information
- Date of birth: 10 February 1992 (age 34)
- Place of birth: Atri, Italy
- Height: 1.78 m (5 ft 10 in)
- Position: Midfielder

Youth career
- 2008–2009: Giulianova

Senior career*
Years	Team	Apps	(Gls)
2009–2010	Giulianova	18	(0)
2010–2018	Napoli	0	(0)
2012–2013	→ Barletta (loan)	26	(7)
2013–2015	→ Crotone (loan)	68	(4)
2016	→ Bari (loan)	18	(5)
2016–2017	→ Perugia (loan)	38	(7)
2017–2018	→ Parma (loan)	35	(1)
2018–2021	Parma	3	(0)
2019–2020	→ Empoli (loan)	18	(2)
2020	→ Virtus Entella (loan)	13	(2)
2021–2022	Venezia	13	(0)
2022–2024	Padova	65	(4)
2025–2026	Arezzo	10	(0)
Total		325	(32)

International career
2014	Italy U21	3	(1)
- * Club domestic league appearances and goals

Jacopo Dezi (born 10 February 1992) is an Italian former professional footballer who played as a central midfielder.

== Career ==
=== Napoli ===
Dezi was signed by Napoli 20 June 2011 in a co-ownership deal for €20,000. In June 2012 Napoli signed Dezi outright for another €90,000. On 18 July 2012, he was signed by Barletta on a temporary deal.

=== Crotone ===
In July 2013, Dezi left for Crotone on a temporary deal, with an option to purchase. On 18 June 2014, Crotone signed Dezi's 50% registration rights for €80,000. On 25 June 2015, Napoli bought back Dezi.

=== Return to Napoli ===
Dezi became a Napoli player again on 1 July 2015. On 28 January 2016, Dezi was signed on loan by Bari, along with his young Napoli teammate Gennaro Tutino, with an option to buy. On 10 August 2016, Dezi left Napoli again for Perugia.

On 25 July 2017, Dezi moved to Italian side Parma, on a loan deal with an obligation to buy.

On 26 July 2019, Dezi joined Serie B club Empoli on loan with an obligation to buy. On 31 January 2020, he moved to Virtus Entella on loan with a conditional obligation to buy.

On 1 February 2021, Dezi signed with Italian club Venezia.

On 31 January 2022, Dezi signed with Padova until 30 June 2024.

On 4 February 2026, Dezi retired from playing.

== Career statistics ==
=== Club ===
As of match played 23 August 2023

Appearances and goals by club, season and competition
Club	Season	League			National Cup (Note: Includes Coppa Italia, Coppa Italia Serie C)		Europe		Other		Total	
Club	Season	Division	Apps	Goals	Apps	Goals	Apps	Goals	Apps	Goals	Apps	Goals
Giulianova	2009–10	Lega Pro 1	19	0	1	0	—		—		20	0
Barletta (loan)	2012–13	Lega Pro 1	26	7	1	0	—		2 (Note: Appearance(s) in Lega Pro play-out)	0	29	7
Crotone	2013–14	Serie B	36	3	2	0	—		1 (Note: Appearance(s) in Serie B play-off)	0	39	3
Crotone	2014–15	Serie B	32	1	1	0	—		—		33	1
Crotone	Total		68	4	3	0	—		1	0	72	4
Bari (loan)	2015–16	Serie B	17	5	0	0	—		1	0	18	5
Perugia (loan)	2016–17	Serie B	36	7	1	0	—		2	0	39	7
Parma	2017–18	Serie B	35	1	0	0	—		—		35	1
Parma	2018–19	Serie A	1	0	0	0	—		—		1	0
Parma	2020–21	Serie A	2	0	2	0	—		—		4	0
Parma	Total		38	1	2	0	—		—		40	1
Empoli (loan)	2019–20	Serie B	18	2	2	1	—		—		20	3
Entella (loan)	2019–20	Serie B	13	2	0	0	—		—		13	2
Venezia	2020–21	Serie B	12	0	0	0	—		4	0	16	0
Venezia	2021–22	Serie A	1	0	0	0	—		—		1	0
Venezia	Total		13	0	0	0	—		4	0	17	0
Padova	2021–22	Serie C	10	0	2	0	—		6 (Note: Appearance(s) in Serie C play-off)	0	18	0
Padova	2022–23	Serie C	29	2	1	0	—		2	0	32	2
Padova	Total		39	2	3	0	—		8	0	50	2
Career total			287	30	13	1	—		18	0	318	31
