= Francisco Sierralta =

Chilean footballer (born 1997)

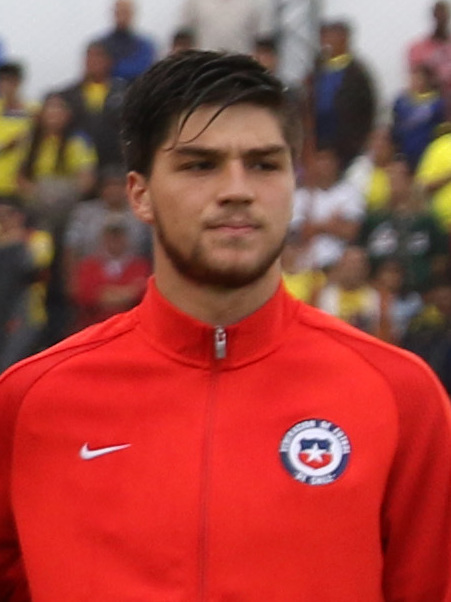
- Sierralta with Chile U20 in 2017

Personal information
- Full name: Francisco Andrés Sierralta Carvallo
- Date of birth: 6 May 1997 (age 29)
- Place of birth: Las Condes, Santiago, Chile
- Height: 1.92 m (6 ft 4 in)
- Positions: Centre-back; defensive midfielder

Team information
- Current team: Piast Gliwice (on loan from Auxerre)
- Number: 22

Youth career
- 2005–2015: Universidad Católica

Senior career*
Years	Team	Apps	(Gls)
2015	Universidad Católica	0	(0)
2015–2017	Granada	0	(0)
2015–2016	→ Universidad Católica (loan)	2	(1)
2016–2017	→ Palestino (loan)	17	(1)
2017–2020	Udinese	0	(0)
2017–2019	→ Parma (loan)	16	(0)
2020	→ Empoli (loan)	11	(1)
2020–2025	Watford	109	(2)
2025–	Auxerre	10	(1)
2026–	→ Piast Gliwice (loan)	0	(0)

International career^{‡}
2015–2017	Chile U20	6	(0)
2018–	Chile	20	(0)
- * Club domestic league appearances and goals as of 20 May 2026 ‡ National team caps and goals as of 19:10, 9 September 2026 (UTC)

Francisco Andrés Sierralta Carvallo (born 6 May 1997) is a Chilean professional footballer who plays as a centre-back or defensive midfielder for Ekstraklasa club Piast Gliwice, on loan from Ligue 1 club Auxerre, and the Chile national team. He started his career with Universidad Católica in 2015 and played for several Italian clubs in his career.

== Club career ==
Sierralta began his career with Universidad Católica and made his debut in the Chile Cup against Barnechea on 8 July 2015. He made his league debut on 26 September, replacing Marco Medel in the final minutes against Huachipato.

In August 2017, Sierralta signed for Udinese before moving to Parma on loan later that year. With the latter club having achieved promotion to 2018–19 Serie A, his loan was extended for another year on 7 August 2018.

On 11 January 2020, Sierralta joined Serie B club Empoli on loan until 30 June.

On 9 September 2020, Sierralta joined Championship club Watford on a three-year contract. He scored his first goal for Watford in a 4–1 victory against Rotherham United on 16 March 2021.

On 19 June 2025, Sierralta joined Ligue 1 club Auxerre on a four-year contract. On 9 September 2026, he moved to Ekstraklasa club Piast Gliwice on a loan until the end of the 2026–27 season.

== International career ==
Along with Chile U20, Sierralta won the L'Alcúdia Tournament in 2015. In 2018, he received his first call-up to the Chilean senior squad on 17 May 2018, and debuted for the Chile in a friendly match against Poland.

== Career statistics ==
=== Club ===
As of match played 21 December 2025

Appearances and goals by club, season and competition
Club	Season	League			National cup (Note: Includes Copa Chile, Coppa Italia, FA Cup, Coupe de France)		League cup (Note: Includes EFL Cup)		Continental		Total	
Club	Season	Division	Apps	Goals	Apps	Goals	Apps	Goals	Apps	Goals	Apps	Goals
Universidad Católica	2015	Chilean Primera División	—		—		—		—		—	
Granada	2015–17	La Liga	—		—		—		—		—	
Universidad Católica (loan)	2015–16	Chilean Primera División	2	1	2	1	—		0	0	4	2
Palestino (loan)	2016–17	Chilean Primera División	17	1	2	0	—		8 (Note: Appearances in Copa Sudamericana)	0	27	1
Udinese	2017–18	Serie A	0	0	0	0	—		—		0	0
Udinese	2018–19	Serie A	0	0	0	0	—		—		0	0
Udinese	2019–20	Serie A	0	0	1	0	—		—		1	0
Udinese	Total		0	0	1	0	—		—		1	0
Parma (loan)	2017–18	Serie B	10	0	0	0	—		—		10	0
Parma (loan)	2018–19	Serie A	6	0	0	0	—		—		6	0
Parma (loan)	Total		16	0	0	0	—		—		16	0
Empoli (loan)	2019–20	Serie B	11	1	0	0	—		—		11	1
Watford	2020–21	Championship	26	1	1	0	2	0	—		29	1
Watford	2021–22	Premier League	5	0	1	0	2	0	—		8	0
Watford	2022–23	Championship	18	1	1	0	1	0	—		20	1
Watford	2023–24	Championship	27	0	3	0	1	0	—		31	0
Watford	2024–25	Championship	33	0	0	0	2	0	—		35	0
Watford	Total		109	2	6	0	8	0	—		123	2
Auxerre	2025–26	Ligue 1	10	1	1	0	—		—		11	1
Auxerre	2026–27	Ligue 1	0	0	—		—		—		0	0
Auxerre	Total		10	1	1	0	—		—		11	1
Piast Gliwice (loan)	2026–27	Ekstraklasa	0	0	0	0	—		—		0	0
Career total			167	6	12	1	8	0	8	0	199	7

=== International ===
As of match played 9 June 2026

Appearances and goals by national team and year
National team	Year	Apps	Goals
Chile	2018	1	0
Chile	2019	1	0
Chile	2020	2	0
Chile	2021	6	0
Chile	2022	5	0
Chile	2025	3	0
Chile	2026	2	0
Total		20	0

== Honours ==
Universidad Católica

- Primera División de Chile: 2016 Clausura

Chile U20

- L'Alcúdia International Tournament: 2015
