= Giovanni Pinto =

Italian footballer

Personal information
- Date of birth: 19 September 1991 (age 35)
- Place of birth: Locorotondo, Italy
- Height: 1.82 m (6 ft 0 in)
- Position: Left-back

Senior career*
Years	Team	Apps	(Gls)
2008–2013	Grottaglie	115	(11)
2013–2017	Monopoli	120	(10)
2017–2019	Parma	0	(0)
2017–2018	→ Ascoli (loan)	15	(1)
2019	→ Pescara (loan)	4	(0)
2019–2022	Catania	78	(1)
2022–2023	Monopoli	22	(2)
2024	Brindisi	11	(0)
2024–2026	Casarano	40	(0)
- * Club domestic league appearances and goals as of 1 May 2026

Giovanni Pinto (born 19 September 1991) is an Italian professional footballer who plays as a left-back.

== Club career ==
Pinto made his Serie C debut for Monopoli on 20 September 2015 in a game against Messina.

On 3 August 2017, he signed a three-year contract with Parma. On 31 August 2017, he was loaned to Ascoli for the 2017–18 season with an option for purchase.

On 31 January 2019, he joined Pescara on loan.

He successively joined Catania in the summer 2019 transfer window. On 9 April 2022, he was released together with all of his Catania teammates following the club's exclusion from Italian football due to its inability to overcome a number of financial issues.

On 29 September 2022, Pinto returned to Monopoli.

On 19 January 2024, Pinto signed with Brindisi.
