= Salvatore Monaco =

Italian footballer

Personal information
- Date of birth: 15 August 1992 (age 34)
- Place of birth: Naples, Italy
- Height: 1.94 m (6 ft 4 in)
- Position: Defender

Senior career*
Years	Team	Apps	(Gls)
–2012	Cecchina	32	(2)
2012–2013	Budoni	30	(1)
2012–2013	Casale	24	(0)
2013–2014	Arzanese	11	(0)
2014	Taranto	0	(0)
2014–2015	Grosseto	20	(1)
2015–2016	Arezzo	12	(0)
2016–2021	Perugia	75	(3)
2018	→ Salernitana (loan)	14	(0)
2019–2020	→ Cosenza (loan)	22	(0)
2021–2023	Padova	31	(1)
2023–2024	Potenza	6	(1)
2024–2025	Catania	12	(0)
2025–2026	Livorno	7	(0)
- * Club domestic league appearances and goals as of 30 April 2026

Salvatore Monaco (born 15 August 1992) is an Italian professional footballer who plays as a defender.

== Club career ==
He made his professional debut in the Lega Pro for Grosseto on 8 November 2014 in a game against Savona.

On 31 July 2019, he joined Cosenza on loan.

On 6 August 2021, he joined to Padova as a free agent.

On 15 September 2023, Monaco signed a two-year contract with Potenza.
