= Riccardo Santovito =

Italian footballer

Personal information
- Date of birth: 6 October 1999 (age 27)
- Place of birth: Rome, Italy
- Height: 1.83 m (6 ft 0 in)
- Position: Centre-back

Team information
- Current team: Acireale

Youth career
- –2015: Carso
- 2015–2017: Latina
- 2017–2018: Parma

Senior career*
Years	Team	Apps	(Gls)
2018–2019	Parma	0	(0)
2018–2019	→ Lucchese (loan)	10	(0)
2019–2021	Reggiana	3	(0)
2020	→ Rimini (loan)	2	(0)
2020–2021	→ Renate (loan)	13	(0)
2021–2022	Flaminia	19	(0)
2022–2024	Trastevere	59	(2)
2024–2025	Sestri Levante	0	(0)
2025–	Acireale	0	(0)
- * Club domestic league appearances and goals as of 21 December 2024

Riccardo Santovito (born 6 October 1999) is an Italian football player who plays for Serie D club Acireale.

== Club career ==
On 25 July 2017, he joined Parma youth team.

For the 2018–19 season, he joined Serie C club Lucchese on a season-long loan. He made his Serie C debut for Lucchese on 18 October 2018 in a game against Arzachena, as a starter.

On 20 January 2020, he moved on loan to Rimini.

On 5 October 2020, he was loaned by Reggiana to Renate. In the 2021-22 season, Santovito played for Flaminia, while he in September 2022 joined Trastevere.

On 7 July 2024, Santovito signed a one-season contract with Sestri Levante.
