= Abdou Diakhaté =

Senegalese footballer

Personal information
- Full name: Abdou Lahad Diakhaté
- Date of birth: 31 December 1998 (age 27)
- Place of birth: Dakar, Senegal
- Height: 1.93 m (6 ft 4 in)
- Position: Midfielder

Team information
- Current team: FCD Termoli Calcio 1920
- Number: 8

Youth career
- 2013–2019: Fiorentina

Senior career*
Years	Team	Apps	(Gls)
2019–2020	Parma	1	(0)
2019–2020	→ Lokeren (loan)	10	(0)
2020–2021	Gorica	1	(0)
2022	Signa 1914		
2022	Sona	5	(0)
2022–2023	Paternò	4	(0)
2023	Locri	17	(1)
2023–2024	Pistoiese		
2024–	Gelbison	5	(0)
- * Club domestic league appearances and goals as of 17 November 2024

Abdou Lahad Diakhaté (born 31 December 1998) is a Senegalese professional footballer who plays as a midfielder for Italian Serie D club Gelbison.

== Club career ==
Diakhaté began his career with the youth academy of ACF Fiorentina in 2013. On 25 January 2019, he signed a professional contract with Parma. Diakhaté made his professional debut for Parma in a 2–1 Serie A loss to Roma on 26 May 2019.

On 21 July 2019, Diakhaté joined Belgian club Lokeren on loan until 30 June 2020.
