= Manuel Scavone =

Italian footballer (born 1987)

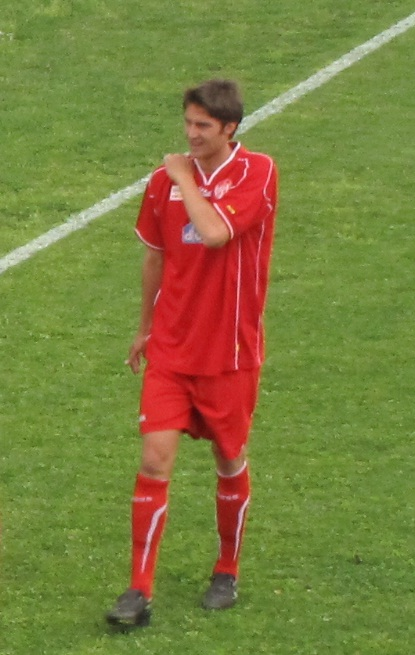
- Scavone in 2010

Personal information
- Date of birth: 3 June 1987 (age 39)
- Place of birth: Bolzano, Italy
- Height: 1.87 m (6 ft 2 in)
- Position: Midfielder

Team information
- Current team: Bolzano

Youth career
- 2007: Südtirol

Senior career*
Years	Team	Apps	(Gls)
2004–2010	Südtirol	125	(19)
2010–2011	Novara	25	(1)
2011–2012	Bari	19	(1)
2012–2016	Pro Vercelli	127	(12)
2016–2019	Parma	61	(7)
2018–2019	→ Lecce (loan)	20	(2)
2019–2023	Bari	47	(5)
2020–2021	→ Pordenone (loan)	31	(1)
2023	Brescia	3	(0)
2023–	Bolzano		

International career
2005	Italy U-20 Serie C	1	(0)
- * Club domestic league appearances and goals as of 19 May 2023

Manuel Scavone (born 3 June 1987) is an Italian footballer who plays as a midfielder for Bolzano.

== Career ==
Born in Bolzano, the autonomous province of South Tyrol, Italy, Scavone started his career at hometown club Südtirol. He made over 100 appearances in Italian Lega Pro Seconda Divisione. In February 2010, he signed a pre-contract with Novara, of Lega Pro Prima Divisione. He officially joined Novara at the end of 2009–10 season, signing 3-year contract, which Novara also promoted to Serie B.

Scavone played 25 games in the second division, which the team also won promotion in successive year. He only started 8 times that season.

In July 2011, he was transferred to Serie B club Bari, also in 3-year contract.

In July 2016, he joined Parma, where he spent two seasons earning two consecutive promotions to Serie B and Serie A.

In August 2018, he moved to Serie B side Lecce on loan and helped the giallorossi team gain promotion to Serie A. During his time at Lecce, Scavone suffered from a head injury after only 4 seconds from kick off in Lecce – Ascoli. The game was suspended and postponed to 23 March 2019, won by Lecce 7:0.

In July 2019, he was signed by Serie C newcomers Bari.

On 29 September 2020 he joined Serie B club Pordenone on loan.

On 31 January 2023, Scavone signed with Brescia.

=== Representative team ===
Scavone capped once for Italy under-20 Serie C team in 2004–05 Mirop Cup.

== Honours ==
Bari

- Serie C: 2021–22 (Group C)
