= Michele Nardi =

Italian footballer

Personal information
- Date of birth: 9 July 1986 (age 40)
- Place of birth: Cesena, Italy
- Height: 1.82 m (6 ft 0 in)
- Position: Goalkeeper

Team information
- Current team: Tre Fiori
- Number: 17

Senior career*
Years	Team	Apps	(Gls)
2004–2005	Cattolica	15	(0)
2005–2017	Santarcangelo	400	(0)
2017–2019	Parma	1	(0)
2018–2019	→ Siena (loan)	0	(0)
2019	→ Südtirol (loan)	16	(0)
2019–2020	Chievo	3	(0)
2020–2022	Cesena	70	(0)
2022–2023	Fermana	17	(0)
2023–	Tre Fiori	95	(0)
- * Club domestic league appearances and goals as of 25 June 2026

Michele Nardi (born 9 July 1986) is an Italian football player. He plays as a goalkeeper for Sammarinese club Tre Fiori.

== Club career ==
He began his senior career as an 18 year old in Serie D club Cattolica, before joining Santarcangelo, where he stayed for 12 seasons winning promotions to Serie C2 and Serie C. He made his Serie C debut for Santarcangelo on 30 August 2014 in a game against Lucchese. In 2017, he was transferred to Serie B club Parma, where he made only 1 appearance before being loaned out to Siena, then in Serie C.

On 24 January 2019 he moved on loan to Südtirol in Serie C.

On 2 September 2019, he signed with Chievo in Serie B.

On 30 September 2020, he joined his hometown club Cesena in Serie C.

On 24 August 2022, Nardi joined Fermana in Serie C.

On 19 July 2023, he signed with Tre Fiori in San Marino.
