= Luca Germoni =

Italian footballer

Personal information
- Date of birth: 1 September 1997 (age 29)
- Place of birth: Rome, Italy
- Height: 1.76 m (5 ft 9 in)
- Position: Left back

Youth career
- –2016: Lazio

Senior career*
Years	Team	Apps	(Gls)
2016–2018	Lazio	0	(0)
2016–2017	→ Ternana (loan)	29	(0)
2017	→ Parma (loan)	5	(0)
2018	→ Perugia (loan)	6	(0)
2018–2019	Virtus Entella	10	(0)
2019	→ Juve Stabia (loan)	12	(1)
2019–2020	Juve Stabia	21	(0)
2020–2021	Reggiana	1	(0)
2021	→ Como (loan)	0	(0)
2021	Südtirol	0	(0)

International career
2015	Italy U18	1	(0)
- * Club domestic league appearances and goals as of 23 November 2021

Luca Germoni (born 1 September 1997) is an Italian professional footballer who plays as a left back.

== Club career ==
Germoni made his professional debut in the Serie B for Ternana on 7 September 2016 in a game against Pisa.

On 12 January 2019 he joined Juve Stabia on loan until the end of the 2018–19 season. Germoni helped the club with promotion to Serie B for the 2019–20 season and in July 2019 it was confirmed, that they had turned the deal into a permanent deal.

On 7 January 2021, he joined Como on loan.

On 2 November 2021, he joined Südtirol as a free agent. On 23 November 2021, his contract was terminated by mutual consent for family reasons.
