= Sebastiano Longo =

Italian footballer

Personal information
- Date of birth: 5 January 1998 (age 28)
- Place of birth: Barcellona Pozzo di Gotto, Italy
- Height: 1.78 m (5 ft 10 in)
- Position: Winger

Team information
- Current team: Igea Virtus
- Number: 10

Youth career
- –2017: Messina
- 2017–2018: Parma

Senior career*
Years	Team	Apps	(Gls)
2016–2017	Messina	2	(0)
2016–2017	→ Igea Virtus (loan)	31	(8)
2018–2021	Parma	0	(0)
2018–2019	→ Paganese (loan)	6	(0)
2019–2020	→ Potenza (loan)	30	(5)
2020–2021	→ Fano (loan)	5	(0)
2021	Casertana	13	(1)
2021–2022	RG Ticino	31	(6)
2022–2023	Castrovillari	28	(3)
2023–2024	Igea Virtus	31	(16)
2024–2025	Siracusa	28	(4)
2025	Virtus Francavilla	7	(1)
2025–	Igea Virtus	23	(3)
- * Club domestic league appearances and goals as of 28 September 2026

Sebastiano Longo (born 5 January 1998) is an Italian footballer who plays as a winger for Serie D club Igea Virtus.

== Club career ==
He made his Serie C debut for Messina on 30 April 2016 in a game against Casertana.

He spent the 2016–17 season on loan at Serie D club Igea Virtus, where he scored 8 goals in 31 games.

On 28 July 2017 he signed with Parma and was assigned to their Under-19 squad.

He joined Paganese on a season-long loan on 31 August 2018. On 20 January 2019, he moved on loan to Potenza. On 14 July 2019, he re-joined Potenza on another loan with an option to buy.

On 30 September 2020, he was loaned to Fano.

On 28 January 2021 he moved on a permanent basis to Casertana.

On 11 October 2021, he moved to RG Ticino in Serie D.
