= Marco Frediani =

Italian footballer

Personal information
- Date of birth: 14 March 1994 (age 32)
- Place of birth: Rome, Italy
- Height: 1.78 m (5 ft 10 in)
- Position: Winger

Team information
- Current team: Lodigiani
- Number: 26

Youth career
- –2005: S.S. Romulea ASD
- 2005–2013: Roma

Senior career*
Years	Team	Apps	(Gls)
2013–2017	Roma	0	(0)
2013–2014	→ L'Aquila (loan)	32	(4)
2014–2015	→ Pisa (loan)	25	(2)
2015–2016	→ Ascoli (loan)	2	(0)
2016–2017	→ Ancona (loan)	41	(8)
2017–2020	Parma	4	(0)
2018–2019	→ Ternana (loan)	31	(4)
2019–2020	→ Sambenedettese (loan)	22	(5)
2020–2021	Alessandria	9	(0)
2021–2022	Fermana	30	(2)
2022–2023	Siena	24	(2)
2023–2024	Monterosi	25	(1)
2025–	Lodigiani	14	(0)

International career
2015	Italy U18	1	(0)
2015	Italy U19	3	(0)
2016	Italy U20	1	(0)
- * Club domestic league appearances and goals as of 25 Juny 2026

Marco Frediani (born 14 March 1994) is an Italian footballer who plays as a winger for Serie D club Lodigiani.

== Club career ==
=== Early career ===
Frediani began his career at S.S. Romulea in his native Rome, Italy. In 2005, he was signed by Serie A giants Roma, to play in their youth teams. He progressed through the youth teams until 2013, making fifty appearances for the Primavera side in total.

=== Loan moves ===
Frediani made the jump from Primavera side to professional sides in 2013, when he was loaned to Lega Pro (then Prima Divisione) side L'Aquila. He was a regular in the side, making 32 appearances and scoring 4 goals. Upon his return to Roma, he made another loan move, this time to Pisa of the same division. Again, he made several appearances and managed to score a further 2 goals, along with 4 assists. He returned to Roma after two positive seasons, but was still unable to break into the first team. He made another loan move, this time to Serie B side Ascoli. In this higher division, Frediani struggled to get playing time and only made two appearances for the Marche side in 6 months. Returning to Roma in the winger transfer window in January 2016, he was signed to an 18-month loan by Ancona, returning to Lega Pro midway through the 2015-16 season and for the entirety of the 2016-17 season. He made his debut for Ancona on 13 March 2016, playing 42 minutes in a 0–0 draw against Arezzo. After being red-carded in a game against Siena, and serving a three-game suspension, Frediani began to play more regularly for Ancona, and managed to score his first goal for the club against Modena on 24 September 2016, before netting 4 more and registering an assist in the next 15 games.

=== Parma ===
==== Loan to Sambenedettese ====
On 1 August 2019 he joined Sambenedettese on loan.

=== Alessandria ===
On 2 October 2020, he signed a two-year contract with Alessandria.

=== Fermana ===
On 31 August 2021, he moved to Fermana on a two-year deal.

=== Siena ===
On 16 July 2022, Frediani joined Siena on a two-year contract.
