= Davide Mastaj =

Italian footballer (born 1998)

Personal information
- Date of birth: 30 April 1998 (age 28)
- Place of birth: Castel Volturno, Italy
- Position: Forward

Team information
- Current team: La Biellese

Youth career
- 2016–2018: Parma

Senior career*
Years	Team	Apps	(Gls)
2015–2017	Colorno		
2016–2017	→ Parma (loan)	0	(0)
2017–2020	Parma	0	(0)
2018–2019	→ Trapani (loan)	1	(0)
2019–2020	→ Carpi (loan)	3	(0)
2020–2021	Gozzano	22	(3)
2021	Lumezzane	0	(0)
2021–	La Biellese	0	(0)
- * Club domestic league appearances and goals as of 30 December 2021

Davide Mastaj (born 30 April 1998) is an Italian footballer who plays for La Biellese.

== Club career ==
=== Parma ===
He started his senior career in the fifth-tier Eccellenza league with Colorno. After joining the youth team of Parma on loan for the 2016–17 season, Parma signed him on a permanent basis on 30 August 2017. He played for their Under-19 squad in the 2017–18 season. He was called up to the senior squad 14 times, but remained on the bench in all those games.

==== Loan to Trapani ====
On 31 August 2018, he joined Serie C club Trapani on a season-long loan.

He made his professional Serie C debut for Trapani on 17 March 2019 in a game against Virtus Francavilla. He replaced Daniele Ferretti in the 74th minute. He finished his loan with making just that one appearance.

==== Loan to Carpi ====
On 2 September 2019, he moved to another Serie C club Carpi on a season-long loan.

== Personal life ==
Born in Italy, Mastaj is of Polish descent.
