= Angelo D'Angelo (footballer) =

Italian footballer (born 1985)

Personal information
- Date of birth: 18 September 1985 (age 41)
- Place of birth: Salerno, Italy
- Height: 1.72 m (5 ft 8 in)
- Position: Defensive midfielder

Senior career*
Years	Team	Apps	(Gls)
2003–2004	Voghera	24	(2)
2004–2005	SPAL	2	(0)
2005–2007	Reno Centese	29	(1)
2007–2009	Gelbison Cilento	57	(15)
2009	Turris	9	(1)
2009–2018	Avellino	254	(23)
2018–2020	Casertana	48	(11)
2020–2021	Sambenedettese	27	(5)
2021–2023	Cavese	12	(2)
- * Club domestic league appearances and goals

Angelo D'Angelo (born 18 September 1985) is an Italian former footballer who played as a defensive midfielder.

== Club career ==
Born in Salerno, D'Angelo spent the vast majority of his career playing for Serie D clubs, before signing to newly reformed side Avellino in December 2009. After enjoying two successive promotions (despite being only achieved due to vacancies) in his first two seasons at the Biancoverdi, he appeared 24 times and scored once during the 2012–13 season, helping the side return to Serie B after a four-year absence.

On 24 August D'Angelo made his Serie B debut, coming on as a second-half substitute in a 2–1 home win over Novara; his first goal came on 5 October, netting the game's only in a home success over Bari.

On 3 October 2020, he joined Sambenedettese on a two-year contract.

On 10 August 2021, he signed a two-year deal with Cavese in Serie D.
