= Fabio Ceravolo =

Italian footballer

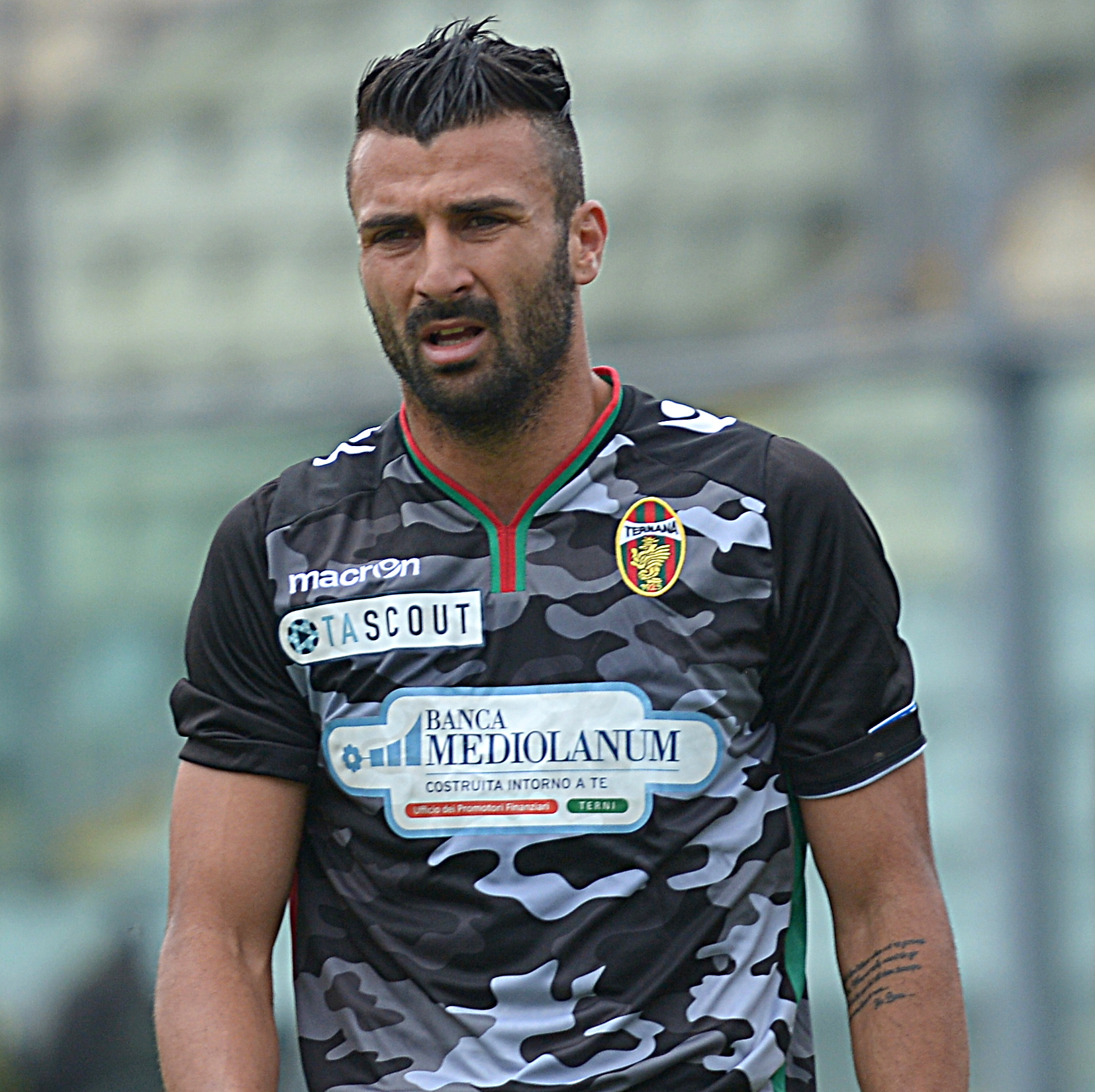
- Ceravolo in action during the match Modena vs. Ternana

Personal information
- Full name: Fabio Giovanni Ceravolo
- Date of birth: 5 March 1987 (age 39)
- Place of birth: Locri, Italy
- Height: 1.80 m (5 ft 11 in)
- Position: Striker

Team information
- Current team: Pro Palazzolo
- Number: 9

Youth career
- 2002–2006: Reggina

Senior career*
Years	Team	Apps	(Gls)
2005–2010	Reggina	46	(3)
2006	→ Pro Vasto (loan)	19	(1)
2007	→ Pisa (loan)	8	(0)
2009–2010	→ Atalanta (loan)	27	(2)
2010–2011	Atalanta	18	(2)
2011–2012	Reggina	58	(16)
2013–2016	Ternana	119	(25)
2016–2018	Benevento	44	(21)
2017–2018	→ Parma (loan)	18	(7)
2018–2019	Parma	26	(2)
2019–2021	Cremonese	45	(2)
2021–2023	Padova	56	(13)
2023–2024	Fiorenzuola	30	(8)
2024–	Pro Palazzolo	14	(5)

International career
2007–2008	Italy U-20	4	(1)
- * Club domestic league appearances and goals as of 17 November 2024

Fabio Giovanni Ceravolo (born 5 March 1987) is an Italian footballer who plays as a striker for Serie D club Pro Palazzolo.

== Career ==
Ceravolo played twice for Reggina in the Coppa Italia before joining Atalanta on loan on 20 August 2009, two days before the start of the Serie A season. As part of the deal, Reggina signed Daniele Capelli on loan.

On 2010–11 season, Atalanta acquired 50% registration rights of Ceravolo for €900,000. In June 2011, Reggina bought back Ceravolo.

On 10 January 2013, he was signed by Ternana.

After three and a half seasons spent at Ternana, he was signed on 7 July 2016 by Serie B newcomers Benevento.

On 2 September 2019, he signed a multi-year contract with Cremonese.

On 31 August 2021, he joined Serie C club Padova.

On 10 August 2023, Ceravolo moved to Fiorenzuola on a one-year deal.
