= Marcello Gazzola =

Italian footballer

Personal information
- Full name: Marcello Gazzola
- Date of birth: 3 April 1985 (age 41)
- Place of birth: Borgo Val di Taro, Italy
- Height: 1.83 m (6 ft 0 in)
- Position: Defender

Youth career
- 1995–2004: Parma

Senior career*
Years	Team	Apps	(Gls)
2004–2006	Sambenedettese	19	(0)
2006–2007	Venezia	2	(0)
2007	Torres	14	(1)
2007–2009	Catania	3	(0)
2008–2009	→ Avellino (loan)	27	(0)
2009–2012	Ascoli	90	(1)
2012–2018	Sassuolo	126	(2)
2018–2020	Parma	39	(1)
2019–2020	→ Empoli (loan)	10	(0)
- * Club domestic league appearances and goals

Marcello Gazzola (born 3 April 1985) is an Italian former footballer who played as a defender.

== Club career ==
=== Early career ===
Born in Borgo Val di Taro, Gazzola started his youth career at Parma in 1995. The defender remained within the youth system of the Emilia-Romagna based club until 2004 and began to earn first team call-ups during the 2003–2004 season, but never made his first team debut. Prior to the 2004–2005 season, Gazzola was sold to Serie C side S.S. Sambenedettese Calcio in a joint-ownership deal.

=== S.S. Sambenedettese Calcio ===
Gazzola joined the Serie C1 club in July 2004, at the age of 19. During his first season, he went on to make five full appearances and 14 appearances in 2005–06, before going out on two short loan spells to S.S.C. Venezia, one at the second half of the 2005–06 season and the second at the beginning of the 2006–07 season. At Venice, the young left back made just 2 appearances for the then-Serie C2 club. Gazzola transferred to Sassari Torres 1903 in January 2007.

=== Sassari Torres ===
Following his transfer to Sassari Torres, Gazzola played 14 games and scored 1 goal in his brief spell. After performing at an impressive level with the third division club, he was sold to Serie A side Calcio Catania at the start of the 2007–08 Serie A season.

=== Calcio Catania ===
Calcio Catania officially announced the signing of the player during the 2007 summer transfer window for an undisclosed fee. During his first season in Sicily, however, Gazzola found playing time very limited due to his lack of experience and due to the presence of experienced full backs Cristian Silvestri, Gennaro Sardo and Rocco Sabato. On 1 August 2008, it was confirmed that Gazzola would spend the 2008–2009 season on loan at Serie B side US Avellino. With the club, Gazzola managed to obtain a starting position and made over 30 appearances in all competitions, but his efforts were not enough to save the club from relegation to the Lega Pro Prima Divisione, although the club were later relegated to the Serie D, following bankruptcy. He returned to Calcio Catania on 1 June 2009.

=== Ascoli Calcio ===
On 25 June 2009, Calcio Catania officially announced the signing of centerback Giuseppe Bellusci from Ascoli Calcio. In part exchange for the player, Ascoli received 50% of the contracts for both, Gazzola and Vito Falconieri. During his season with Ascoli, he made 33 Serie B appearances alone.

=== Sassuolo ===
On 1 July 2015, Gazzola signed a new one-year contract with Sassuolo. He renewed again on 27 May 2016.

=== Parma ===
On 16 January 2018, Gazzola left Sassuolo to join his former youth club Parma in Serie B for a reported £222,000 (€250,000) fee.

==== Loan to Empoli ====
On 24 August 2019, Gazzola joined Serie B club Empoli on loan with an option to buy.
