= Amato Ciciretti =

Italian professional footballer (born 1993)

Personal information
- Date of birth: 31 December 1993 (age 32)
- Place of birth: Rome, Italy
- Height: 1.70 m (5 ft 7 in)
- Position: Forward

Youth career
- 2001–2004: Lazio
- 2004–2012: Roma

Senior career*
Years	Team	Apps	(Gls)
2012–2015	Roma	0	(0)
2012–2013	→ Carrarese (loan)	19	(0)
2013–2014	→ L'Aquila (loan)	22	(1)
2014	→ Pistoiese (loan)	9	(0)
2015	→ Messina (loan)	21	(3)
2015–2018	Benevento	73	(14)
2018	→ Parma (loan)	8	(1)
2018–2021	Napoli	0	(0)
2018–2019	→ Parma (loan)	6	(0)
2019	→ Ascoli (loan)	15	(2)
2020	→ Empoli (loan)	17	(4)
2020–2021	→ Chievo (loan)	29	(3)
2021–2023	Pordenone	8	(0)
2022	→ Como (loan)	11	(2)
2022–2023	→ Ascoli (loan)	13	(2)
2023–2024	Benevento	17	(4)
2024	Ospitaletto	4	(0)
2025	Latina	4	(0)

International career
2011	Italy U18	5	(1)
2011	Italy U19	6	(2)
- * Club domestic league appearances and goals as of 1 October 2025

Amato Ciciretti (born 31 December 1993) is an Italian professional footballer who plays as a forward.

== Career ==
Born in Rome, Ciciretti joined the youth ranks of S.S. Lazio at age eight and moved to A.S. Roma three years later. He made his professional debut on 2 September 2012 in the Serie C while on loan at Carrarese. He then had a series of loan spells at L'Aquila, Pistoiese and Messina before transferring to Benevento in 2015. He was a starter in Benevento's promotion campaign in the 2016–17 Serie B, making 35 appearances and scoring six goals. He made his Serie A debut on 20 August 2017 scoring a goal in a 2–1 away loss to Sampdoria. In January 2018, he was sent on loan to Parma and participated in the team's promotion campaign in the 2017–18 Serie B.

=== Napoli ===
On 1 July 2018, Ciciretti joined Napoli on a five-year contract. He was sent again on loan to Parma for the 2018–19 season.

On 25 January 2019, Ciciretti joined to Ascoli on loan until 30 June 2019.

On 9 January 2020, Ciciretti joined Serie B club Empoli on loan with an option to buy.

On 5 October 2020, he was loaned to Chievo in Serie B.

=== Pordenone ===
On 6 August 2021, Pordenone announced the signing of Ciciretti on a three-year deal from Napoli.

On 26 January 2022, he joined Como on loan until the end of the season, with an option to buy.

=== Ascoli ===
On 7 July 2022, Ciciretti returned to Ascoli on loan with an obligation to buy.

=== Return to Benevento ===
On 8 September 2023, Ciciretti returned to Benevento on a one-season contract, now relegated to Serie C.

== Career statistics ==
=== Club ===
As of 9 January 2020

Club	Season	League		Cup		Europe		Other		Total	
Club	Season	Apps	Goals	Apps	Goals	Apps	Goals	Apps	Goals	Apps	Goals
Carrarese (loan)	2012–13	19	0	0	0	–		–		19	0
L'Aquila (loan)	2013–14	21	1	1	0	–		1	0	23	1
Pistoiese (loan)	2014–15	9	0	0	0	–		–		9	0
Messina (loan)	2014–15	19	3	0	0	–		2	0	21	3
Benevento	2015–16	26	6	2	1	–		2	1	30	8
Benevento	2016–17	35	6	1	0	–		1	0	37	6
Benevento	2017–18	12	2	1	0	–		–		13	2
Benevento	Total	73	14	4	1	–		3	1	80	16
Parma (loan)	2017–18	8	1	0	0	–		–		8	1
Parma (loan)	2018–19	6	0	0	0	–		–		6	0
Parma (loan)	Total	14	1	0	0	–		–		14	1
Ascoli (loan)	2018–19	15	2	0	0	–		–		15	2
Career Total		170	21	5	1	–		6	1	181	23
