= Antonio Di Gaudio =

Italian footballer (born 1989)

Personal information
- Date of birth: 16 August 1989 (age 37)
- Place of birth: Palermo, Italy
- Height: 1.69 m (5 ft 7 in)
- Position: Winger

Youth career
- 2006–2007: Hellas Verona

Senior career*
Years	Team	Apps	(Gls)
2007–2010	Virtus Castelfranco	95	(21)
2010–2017	Carpi	199	(23)
2017–2019	Parma	47	(5)
2019	→ Hellas Verona (loan)	16	(1)
2019–2021	Hellas Verona	0	(0)
2020	→ Spezia (loan)	11	(1)
2021	Chievo	17	(1)
2021–2023	Avellino	36	(5)
2024–2025	Athletic Club Palermo	12	(3)
- * Club domestic league appearances and goals as of 21 September 2024

Antonio Di Gaudio (born 16 August 1989) is an Italian footballer who plays as a winger.

== Career ==
Born in Palermo, Di Gaudio made his senior debut with Virtus Castelfranco in Serie D. After netting ten times in the 2009–10 season, he joined Carpi.

On 24 August 2013, Di Gaudio made his Serie B debut, starting in a 0–1 loss at Ternana; he scored his first goal on 30 November, his side's last of a 2–4 loss at Pescara.

On 23 January 2019, he joined Hellas Verona on loan with an obligation to buy.

On 31 January 2020, he was loaned to Spezia.

On 1 February 2021, he moved to Chievo on a 6-month contract with an extension option.

On 31 August 2021, he signed a two-year contract with Avellino.

After a year without a club, Di Gaudio moved back to his hometown, and signed for Eccellenza Sicily amateur club Athletic Club Palermo on 21 September 2024.
