= Pierluigi Frattali =

Italian footballer

Personal information
- Date of birth: 1 December 1985 (age 40)
- Place of birth: Rome, Italy
- Height: 1.85 m (6 ft 1 in)
- Position: Goalkeeper

Youth career
- 1998–2000: Roma
- 2000–2002: Almas Roma
- 2002–2003: San Lorenzo
- 2003–2004: Frosinone

Senior career*
Years	Team	Apps	(Gls)
2004–2011	Frosinone	34	(0)
2004–2005	→ Astrea (loan)	38	(0)
2011–2012	Vicenza	1	(0)
2012	Hellas Verona	2	(0)
2012–2013	Vallée d'Aoste	24	(0)
2013–2014	Cosenza	33	(0)
2014–2017	Avellino	61	(0)
2017–2019	Parma	56	(0)
2019–2023	Bari	93	(0)
2023–2025	Frosinone	0	(0)
Total		342	(0)
- * Club domestic league appearances and goals as of 13 May 2025

Pierluigi Frattali (born 1 December 1985) is an Italian footballer who plays as a goalkeeper.

== Career ==
Frattali in the 2003–2004 season played in the youth team of Frosinone. The following year, he was sent on loan to Astrea. He returned to Frosinone, where he remained for 6 seasons, making his debut as a professional player in Serie B on 13 September 2008, in the match Salernitana-Frosinone 3–2.

Frattali was signed by Parma as the starting goalkeeper in January 2017. He missed all of March due to injury, with Davide Bassi replacing him as the starting keeper.

On 14 July 2019, he signed a 3-year contract with Bari.

On 29 August 2023, Frosinone, which played in Serie A, announced the return of Frattali, twenty years after his first experience with the Ciociaro club. He signed a two years contract with Frosinone.

== Career statistics ==
=== Club ===
Appearances and goals by club, season and competition
Club	Season	League			Cup		Other		Total	
Club	Season	Division	Apps	Goals	Apps	Goals	Apps	Goals	Apps	Goals
Frosinone	2005–06	Serie C1	0	0	0	0	—		0	0
Frosinone	2006–07	Serie B	0	0	0	0	—		0	0
Frosinone	2007–08	Serie B	0	0	0	0	—		0	0
Frosinone	2008–09	Serie B	22	0	1	0	—		23	0
Frosinone	2009–10	Serie B	9	0	1	0	—		10	0
Frosinone	2010–11	Serie B	3	0	2	0	—		5	0
Frosinone	Total		34	0	4	0	—		38	0
Astrea (loan)	2004–05	Serie D	38	0	0	0	—		38	0
Vicenza	2010–11	Serie B	1	0	—		—		1	0
Hellas Verona	2011–12	Serie B	2	0	0	0	0	0	2	0
Vallée d'Aoste	2012–13	Lega Pro 2	24	0	—		2	0	26	0
Cosenza	2013–14	Lega Pro 2	33	0	—		1	0	34	0
Avellino	2014–15	Serie B	11	0	1	0	3	0	15	0
Avellino	2015–16	Serie B	39	0	2	0	—		41	0
Avellino	2016–17	Serie B	11	0	1	0	—		12	0
Avellino	Total		61	0	4	0	3	0	68	0
Parma	2016–17	Lega Pro	13	0	—		6	0	19	0
Parma	2017–18	Serie B	42	0	1	0	—		43	0
Parma	2018–19	Serie A	1	0	0	0	—		1	0
Parma	Total		56	0	1	0	6	0	63	0
Bari	2019–20	Serie C	27	0	—		5	0	32	0
Bari	2020–21	Serie C	35	0	1	0	3	0	39	0
Bari	2021–22	Serie C	30	0	—		2	0	32	0
Bari	2021–22	Serie B	1	0	1	0	—		32	0
Bari	2023–24	Serie B	0	0	1	0	—		1	0
Bari	Total		93	0	3	0	10	0	106	0
Frosinone	2023–24	Serie B	0	0	0	0	—		0	0
Frosinone	2024–25	Serie B	0	0	0	0	—		0	0
Frosinone	Total		0	0	0	0	—		0	0
Career total			342	0	12	0	22	0	386	0

== Honours ==
Bari

- Serie C: 2021–22 (Group C)
