= Francesco Giorno =

Italian footballer

Personal information
- Date of birth: 11 October 1993 (age 33)
- Place of birth: Busto Arsizio, Italy
- Height: 1.80 m (5 ft 11 in)
- Position: Midfielder

Team information
- Current team: Celle Varazze
- Number: 11

Youth career
- –2012: Pro Patria

Senior career*
Years	Team	Apps	(Gls)
2012–2015	Pro Patria	48	(2)
2015–2016	Vis Pesaro	25	(3)
2016–2017	Casertana	34	(2)
2017–2019	Parma	0	(0)
2017	→ Modena (loan)	5	(0)
2018	→ Vicenza (loan)	15	(1)
2018–2019	→ Monza (loan)	9	(0)
2019	→ Chiasso (loan)	9	(0)
2019–2021	Monopoli	42	(1)
2021–2022	Alessandria	15	(0)
2021–2022	→ Triestina (loan)	16	(0)
2022–2023	Virtus Francavilla	12	(0)
2023	→ Piacenza (loan)	14	(0)
2023–2024	AlbinoLeffe	6	(0)
2024–2025	Sestri Levante	13	(0)
2026–	Celle Varazze	5	(0)
- * Club domestic league appearances and goals as of 15 February 2026

Francesco Giorno (born 11 October 1993) is an Italian footballer who plays for Serie D club Celle Varazze.

== Club career ==
He made his Serie C debut for Pro Patria on 6 October 2013 in a game against San Marino.

On 4 February 2019, he joined Swiss club Chiasso on loan.

On 19 July 2019, he signed a 3-year contract with Monopoli.

On 13 January 2021, he joined Alessandria on a 2.5-year contract. After making his Serie B debut for Alessandria on 22 August 2021, on 31 August 2021 he moved to Triestina on loan.

On 17 August 2022, Giorno moved to Virtus Francavilla. On 11 January 2023, he was loaned by Piacenza.

On 11 August 2023, Giorno signed a one-year deal with AlbinoLeffe. On 18 September 2024, he joined Sestri Levante for one season.
