= Aglianese Calcio 1923 =

Italian football club

Aglianese
- Full name: AM Aglianese Calcio 1923 srl
- Nickname: Nero-verdi (Black-greens)
- Founded: 1923
- Ground: Stadio G. Bellucci, Agliana, Italy
- Capacity: 2,582
- Chairman: Lorenzo Mazzetti
- Manager: Francesco Giannini
- League: Promozione
- Promozione 2026-27: pattern_la1=
Home colours	Away colours

AM Aglianese Calcio 1923 is an Italian association football club located in Agliana, Tuscany. In the upcoming 2026/27 season it will play in Promozione. They are most known for being the first Italian team to have green and black stripes.
