= Antonino Barillà =

Italian footballer (born 1988)

Personal information
- Date of birth: 1 April 1988 (age 38)
- Place of birth: Reggio Calabria, Italy
- Height: 1.80 m (5 ft 11 in)
- Position: Central midfielder

Team information
- Current team: Reggina
- Number: 17

Youth career
- Reggina

Senior career*
Years	Team	Apps	(Gls)
2005–2014	Reggina	192	(10)
2007–2008	→ Ravenna (loan)	22	(0)
2013	→ Sampdoria (loan)	3	(0)
2014–2017	Trapani	98	(11)
2017–2020	Parma	81	(8)
2020–2022	Monza	30	(3)
2022	Alessandria	4	(0)
2023	Viterbese	13	(1)
2023–	Reggina	53	(19)

International career
2009–2010	Italy U21	7	(2)
- * Club domestic league appearances and goals as of 27 March 2025

Antonino "Nino" Barillà (born 1 April 1988) is an Italian professional footballer who plays as a central midfielder for Serie D Group I club Reggina.

== Club career ==
Barillà made his debut in Serie A with Reggina in the 2005–06 season, on 7 May 2006 against Fiorentina.

Barillà scored his first goal against the then-Serie A club Torino in a 2–2 draw. His second goal came against Juventus on 26 April 2009, where he scored with his head at the near post from an Adejo cross, which was delivered from just outside the penalty area on the top right side.

On 25 August 2020, Barillà joined newly-promoted Serie B club Monza on a two-year contract. The club released him on 25 January 2022.

On 25 February 2022, Barillà signed with Serie B club Alessandria until the end of the season.

On 13 January 2023, Barillà signed with Serie C club Viterbese.

== International career ==
On 25 March 2009, Barillà made his debut with the Italy under-21 team in a friendly match against Austria. He played seven games for the under-21 side, scoring two goals.
