= 2016–17 Parma Calcio 1913 season =

Parma
2016–17 season
- Manager: Luigi Apolloni, then Roberto D'Aversa
- Stadium: Stadio Ennio Tardini
- Lega Pro: 2nd
- Coppa Italia Serie C: First Round
Home colours	Away colours	Third colours

The 2016–17 season was Parma Calcio 1913's first season in the Lega Pro since the 1980s.

The season ended in a second successive promotion.
