= 2016–17 Juventus FC season =

Italian football club season

Juventus
2016–17 season
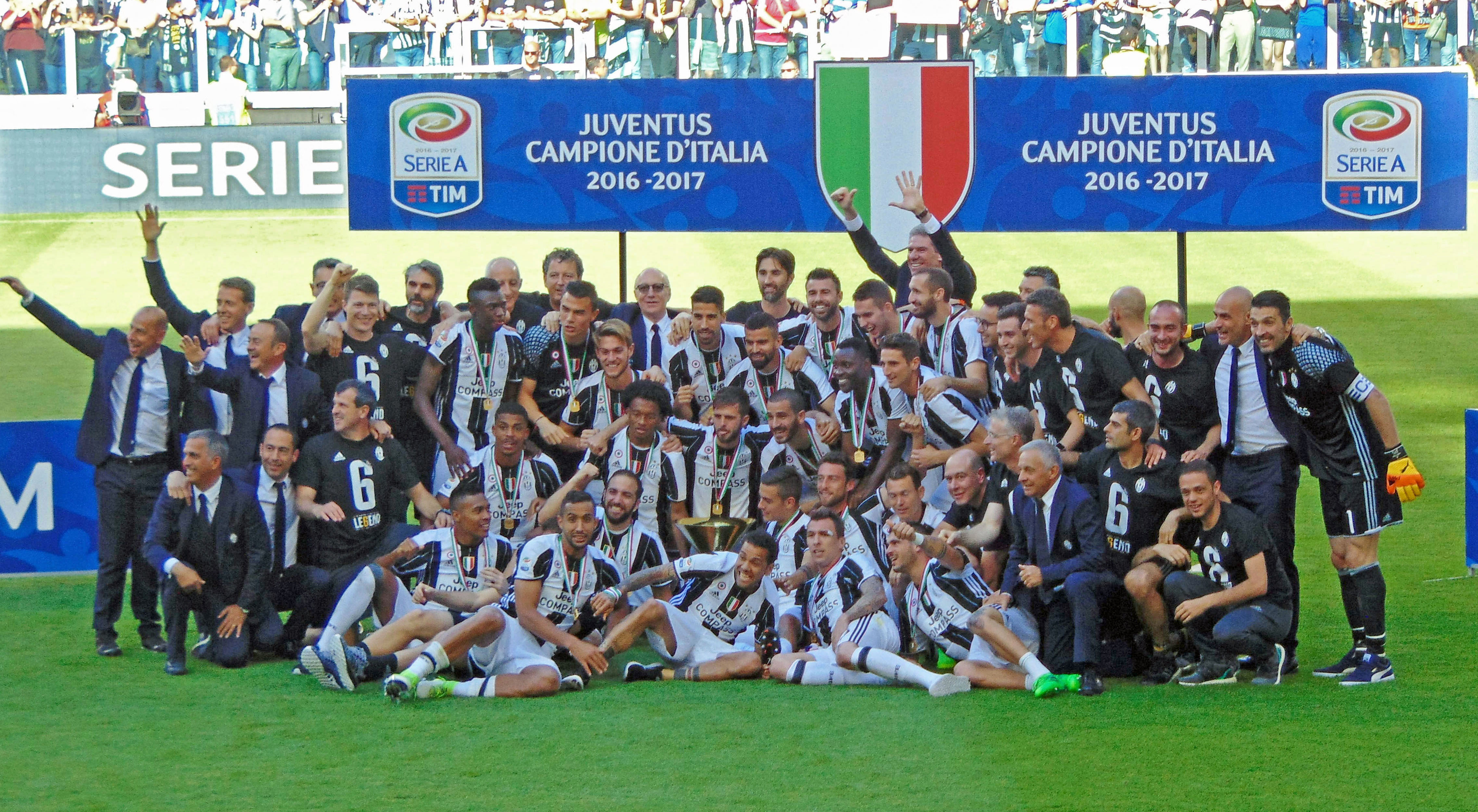
- Juventus celebrating their title win
- Chairman: Andrea Agnelli
- Head coach: Massimiliano Allegri
- Stadium: Juventus Stadium
- Serie A: 1st
- Coppa Italia: Winners
- Supercoppa Italiana: Runner-up
- UEFA Champions League: Runner-up
- Top goalscorer: League: Gonzalo Higuaín (24); All: Gonzalo Higuaín (32)
- Highest home attendance: 41,470 vs Roma (17 December 2016, Serie A)
- Lowest home attendance: 33,261 vs Sevilla (14 September 2016, Champions League)
- Average home league attendance: 39,936
| Home colours | Away colours | Third colours |

The 2016–17 season was Juventus Football Club's 119th in existence and tenth consecutive season in the top flight of Italian football. Juventus redesigned their kit with a different take on the trademark white and black stripes in this season. On 26 July 2016, Juventus signing Gonzalo Higuaín became, at the time, the third highest football transfer of all-time and highest ever transfer for an Italian club, when he signed for €90 million from Napoli. On 8 August 2016, Paul Pogba returned to his first club, Manchester United, for an all-time record for highest football transfer fee at €105 million, surpassing the former record holder Gareth Bale.

On 17 May 2017, Juventus won their 12th Coppa Italia title in a 2–0 win over Lazio, becoming the first team to win three consecutive championships. Four days later on 21 May, following a 3–0 win over Crotone, Juventus secured their sixth consecutive Serie A title, establishing an all-time record of successive triumphs in the competition. On 3 June 2017, Juventus entered a second Champions League Final in three years, but were defeated 4–1 by defending champions Real Madrid. During a screening of the Champions League Final in Turin, a firecracker caused panic, and a subsequent stampede. One woman died, and at least 1,526 people were injured.

== Players ==
=== Squad information ===
Players and squad numbers last updated on 25 May 2017.
Note: Flags indicate national team as has been defined under FIFA eligibility rules. Players may hold more than one non-FIFA nationality.

| No. | Name | Nat | Position(s) | Date of birth (Age at end of season) | Signed in | Contract ends | Signed from | Transfer Fee | Notes |
Goalkeepers
| 1 | Gianluigi Buffon | (Italy) | GK | 28 January 1978 (aged 39) | 2001 | 2018 | (Italy) Parma | €45M | Captain |
| 25 | Neto | (Brazil) | GK | 19 July 1989 (aged 27) | 2015 | 2019 | (Italy) Fiorentina | Free | |
| 32 | Emil Audero | (Italy) | GK | 18 January 1997 (aged 20) | 2015 | 2021 | (Italy) Youth Sector | N/A | |
Defenders
| 3 | Giorgio Chiellini | (Italy) | CB / LB | 14 August 1984 (aged 32) | 2005 | 2018 | (Italy) Fiorentina | €7.4M | Vice-captain |
| 4 | Medhi Benatia | (Morocco) | CB | 17 April 1987 (aged 30) | 2016 | 2020 | (Germany) Bayern Munich | €20M | |
| 12 | Alex Sandro | (Brazil) | LB / LWB | 26 January 1991 (aged 26) | 2015 | 2020 | (Portugal) Porto | €26M | |
| 15 | Andrea Barzagli | (Italy) | CB / RB | 8 May 1981 (aged 36) | 2011 | 2018 | (Germany) Wolfsburg | €0.3M | |
| 19 | Leonardo Bonucci | (Italy) | CB | 1 May 1987 (aged 30) | 2010 | 2021 | (Italy) Bari | €15.5M | |
| 23 | Dani Alves | (Brazil) | RB / RWB | 6 May 1983 (aged 34) | 2016 | 2018 | (Spain) Barcelona | Free | |
| 24 | Daniele Rugani | (Italy) | CB | 29 July 1994 (aged 22) | 2015 | 2021 | (Italy) Empoli | €3.5M | |
| 26 | Stephan Lichtsteiner | (Switzerland) | RB / RWB | 16 January 1984 (aged 33) | 2011 | 2018 | (Italy) Lazio | €10M | |
| 29 | Paolo De Ceglie | (Italy) | LB / LWB | 17 September 1986 (aged 30) | 2006 | 2017 | (Italy) Youth Sector | N/A | |
Midfielders
| 5 | Miralem Pjanić | (Bosnia and Herzegovina) | CM / AM | 2 April 1990 (aged 27) | 2016 | 2021 | (Italy) Roma | €32M | |
| 6 | Sami Khedira | (Germany) | DM / CM | 4 April 1987 (aged 30) | 2015 | 2019 | (Spain) Real Madrid | Free | |
| 8 | Claudio Marchisio | (Italy) | CM / AM | 19 January 1986 (aged 31) | 2006 | 2020 | (Italy) Youth Sector | N/A | Second vice-captain |
| 14 | Federico Mattiello | (Italy) | RM / RB | 14 July 1995 (aged 21) | 2014 | 2019 | (Italy) Youth Sector | N/A | |
| 18 | Mario Lemina | (Gabon) | DM / CM | 1 September 1993 (aged 23) | 2015 | 2020 | (France) Marseille | €9.5M | |
| 22 | Kwadwo Asamoah | (Ghana) | CM / LM / LWB | 9 December 1988 (aged 28) | 2012 | 2018 | (Italy) Udinese | €18M | |
| 27 | Stefano Sturaro | (Italy) | DM / CM | 9 March 1993 (aged 24) | 2014 | 2021 | (Italy) Genoa | €5.5M | |
| 28 | Tomás Rincón | (Venezuela) | DM / RB | 13 January 1988 (aged 29) | 2017 | 2020 | (Italy) Genoa | €8M | |
| 38 | Rolando Mandragora | (Italy) | DM / CM | 29 June 1997 (aged 20) | 2016 | 2021 | (Italy) Genoa | €6M | |
Forwards
| 7 | Juan Cuadrado | (Colombia) | RW / RWB | 26 May 1988 (aged 29) | 2016 | 2020 | (England) Chelsea | €25M | |
| 9 | Gonzalo Higuaín | (Argentina) | ST / CF | 10 December 1987 (aged 29) | 2016 | 2021 | (Italy) Napoli | €90M | |
| 17 | Mario Mandžukić | (Croatia) | ST / CF / LW | 21 May 1986 (aged 31) | 2015 | 2020 | (Spain) Atlético Madrid | €19M | |
| 20 | Marko Pjaca | (Croatia) | SS / LW / RW | 6 May 1995 (aged 22) | 2016 | 2021 | (Croatia) Dinamo Zagreb | €23M | |
| 21 | Paulo Dybala | (Argentina) | ST / CF / SS | 15 November 1993 (aged 23) | 2015 | 2022 | (Italy) Palermo | €32M | |
| 34 | Moise Kean | (Italy) | ST / CF | 28 February 2000 (aged 17) | 2016 | | (Italy) Youth Sector | N/A | |

== Transfers ==
=== Summer 2016 ===
==== In ====
| Date | Pos. | Player | Age | Moving from | Fee | Notes | Source |
|---|---|---|---|---|---|---|---|
| 13 June 2016 | MF | (Bosnia and Herzegovina) Miralem Pjanić | 26 | (Italy) Roma | €32M | | |
| 27 June 2016 | DF | (Brazil) Dani Alves | 33 | (Spain) Barcelona | Free | | |
| 15 July 2016 | DF | (Morocco) Medhi Benatia | 29 | (Germany) Bayern Munich | €3M | On loan until 2017 with buy option for an extra €17M | |
| 21 July 2016 | FW | (Croatia) Marko Pjaca | 21 | (Croatia) Dinamo Zagreb | €23M | Paid in two installments | |
| 26 July 2016 | FW | (Argentina) Gonzalo Higuaín | 28 | (Italy) Napoli | €90M | Paid in two installments. Third most expensive transfer at the time | |
| 31 August 2016 | FW | (Colombia) Juan Cuadrado | 28 | (England) Chelsea | €5M per season | On loan until June 2019 with an option to buy for a total €25M deducting paid loan fees + €4M in variables | |

==== Out ====
| Date | Pos. | Player | Age | Moving to | Fee | Notes | Source |
|---|---|---|---|---|---|---|---|
| 21 June 2016 | FW | (Spain) Álvaro Morata | 23 | (Spain) Real Madrid | €30M | Buy-back clause | |
| 30 June 2016 | DF | (Uruguay) Martín Cáceres | 29 | Unattached | Free | Contract expiration | |
| 30 June 2016 | GK | (Brazil) Rubinho | 33 | Unattached | Free | Contract expiration | |
| 30 June 2016 | FW | (Colombia) Juan Cuadrado | 28 | (England) Chelsea | | End of loan spell | |
| 30 June 2016 | FW | (Italy) Andrea Favilli | 19 | (Italy) Livorno | | End of loan spell | |
| 4 July 2016 | MF | (Italy) Simone Padoin | 32 | (Italy) Cagliari | €0.6M | Paid in three installments | |
| 8 August 2016 | MF | (France) Paul Pogba | 23 | (England) Manchester United | €105M+5M variables | Paid in two installments. Most expensive football transfer | |
| 10 August 2016 | DF | (Chile) Mauricio Isla | 28 | (Italy) Cagliari | €4M | Paid in three installments | |
| 19 August 2016 | MF | (Argentina) Roberto Pereyra | 25 | (England) Watford | €13M+2M variables | Paid in four installments | |
| 28 August 2016 | FW | (Italy) Simone Zaza | 25 | (England) West Ham United | €5M | On loan until 2017, with obligation to buy for an extra €20M + €3M in variables after a certain number of Premier League appearances | |
| 30 August 2016 | MF | (Italy) Luca Marrone | 26 | (Belgium) Zulte Waregem | | On loan until 2017 | |

==== Other acquisitions ====
| Date | Pos. | Player | Age | Moving from | Fee | Notes | Source |
|---|---|---|---|---|---|---|---|
| 24 March 2016 | FW | (Italy) Simone Ganz | 22 | (Italy) Como | Free | | |
| 29 April 2016 | MF | (Gabon) Mario Lemina | 22 | (France) Marseille | €9.5M+1M variables | Bought out loan from Marseille €9.5M paid in four installments | |
| 30 June 2016 | FW | (Italy) Elia Petrelli | 14 | (Italy) Cesena | Undisclosed | | |
| 1 July 2016 | DF | (Italy) Paolo De Ceglie | 29 | (France) Marseille | | End of loan | |
| 1 July 2016 | MF | (Italy) Rolando Mandragora | 19 | (Italy) Pescara | | End of loan | |
| 1 July 2016 | MF | (Italy) Luca Marrone | 26 | (Italy) Hellas Verona | | End of loan | |
| 1 July 2016 | MF | (Italy) Federico Mattiello | 20 | (Italy) Chievo | | End of loan | |

==== Other disposals ====
| Date | Pos. | Player | Age | Moving to | Fee | Notes | Source |
|---|---|---|---|---|---|---|---|
| 17 June 2016 | MF | (Brazil) Gabriel Appelt Pires | 22 | (Spain) Leganés | €1M | Redeem after loan | |
| 22 June 2016 | MF | (Liechtenstein) Marcel Büchel | 25 | (Italy) Empoli | €1.2M | Redeem after loan | |
| 1 July 2016 | DF | (Italy) Lorenzo Benucci | 19 | (Italy) Prato | Free | Contract expiration | |
| 1 July 2016 | GK | (Romania) Laurențiu Brănescu | 22 | (Romania) Dinamo Bucarest | | On loan until 2018 | |
| 1 July 2016 | MF | (Italy) Eros Castelletto | 20 | (Italy) Pro Settimo & Eureka | Free | Contract expiration | |
| 1 July 2016 | GK | (Italy) Vincenzo Fiorillo | 26 | (Italy) Pescara | €1M | Redeem after loan | |
| 1 July 2016 | FW | (Italy) Simone Ganz | 22 | (Italy) Verona | | On loan until 2017 | |
| 1 July 2016 | MF | (Italy) Carlo Ilari | 24 | (Italy) Teramo | Free | Contract expiration | |
| 1 July 2016 | FW | (Italy) Francesco Margiotta | 22 | (Switzerland) Lousanne | | On loan until 2018 | |
| 1 July 2016 | MF | (Uruguay) Jorge Martínez | 33 | (Uruguay) Juventud | Free | Contract expiration | |
| 1 July 2016 | MF | (Italy) Fausto Rossi | 25 | - | Free | Contract expiration | |
| 1 July 2016 | MF | (Italy) Andrea Schiavone | 23 | (Italy) Cesena | €0.4M | | |
| 1 July 2016 | DF | (Italy) Christian Tavanti | 21 | (Italy) Sambenedettese | | On loan until 2017 | |
| 4 July 2016 | DF | (Italy) Matteo Liviero | 23 | (Italy) Juve Stabia | Free | Contract expiration | |
| 4 July 2016 | MF | (Colombia) Andrés Tello | 19 | (Italy) Empoli | | On loan until 2017 | |
| 6 July 2016 | MF | (Italy) Mattia Vitale | 18 | (Italy) Cesena | | On loan until 2017 | |
| 7 July 2016 | MF | (Italy) Leonardo Spinazzola | 23 | (Italy) Atalanta | | On loan until 2018 | |
| 7 July 2016 | GK | (Italy) Nicola Leali | 23 | (Greece) Olympiacos | | On loan until 2017 | |
| 8 July 2016 | FW | (Switzerland) Zoran Josipovic | 23 | (Switzerland) Aarau | Free | Contract expiration | |
| 8 July 2016 | DF | (Spain) Marcelo Djaló | 22 | (Spain) Lugo | Free | Contract expiration | |
| 12 July 2016 | DF | (Italy) Luca Barlocco | 21 | (Italy) Alessandria | | On loan until 2017 | |
| 13 July 2016 | FW | (Italy) Stefano Padovan | 22 | (Italy) Foggia | | On loan until 2017 | |
| 13 July 2016 | DF | (Iceland) Hörður Magnússon | 23 | (England) Bristol City | €2.5M | | |
| 14 July 2016 | MF | (Italy) Matteo Gerbaudo | 21 | (Italy) Pordenone | Undisclosed | | |
| 15 July 2016 | DF | (Italy) Michele Cavion | 21 | (Italy) Cremonese | | On loan until 2017 | |
| 15 July 2016 | GK | (Italy) Alberto Gallinetta | 24 | (Italy) Santarcangelo | | On loan until 2017 | |
| 15 July 2016 | MF | (Spain) Nico Hidalgo | 24 | (Spain) Cádiz | | On loan until 2017 | |
| 19 July 2016 | DF | (Romania) Vlad Marin | 21 | (Belgium) FCV Dender EH | | On loan until 2018 | |
| 20 July 2016 | FW | (Italy) Stefano Beltrame | 23 | (Netherlands) Den Bosch | | On loan until 2017 | |
| 20 July 2016 | FW | (Greece) Anastasios Donis | 19 | (France) Nice | | On loan until 2017 | |
| 20 July 2016 | GK | (Italy) Alberto Brignoli | 24 | (Spain) Leganés | | On loan until 2017 | |
| 20 July 2016 | GK | (Italy) Carlo Pinsoglio | 26 | (Italy) Latina | | On loan until 2017 | |
| 20 July 2016 | DF | (Spain) Pol García | 21 | (Italy) Latina | | On loan until 2017 | |
| 21 July 2016 | DF | (Italy) Nicolò Curti | 21 | (Italy) Pontedera | Undisclosed | | |
| 21 July 2016 | DF | (Greece) Albert Roussos | 20 | (Greece) Iraklis | Free | Contract expiration | |
| 21 July 2016 | FW | (Italy) Eric Lanini | 19 | (Belgium) Westerlo | | On loan until 2017 | |
| 22 July 2016 | FW | (Italy) Davide Cais | 22 | (Italy) Pontedera | | On loan until 2017 | |
| 22 July 2016 | FW | (Italy) King Udoh | 18 | (Italy) Pontedera | | On loan until 2017 | |
| 22 July 2016 | | (Italy) Claudio Zappa | | (Italy) Pontedera | | On loan until 2017 | |
| 24 July 2016 | GK | (Italy) Francesco Anacoura | 21 | (Italy) Casertana | | On loan until 2017 | |
| 24 July 2016 | GK | (Italy) Timothy Nocchi | 26 | (Italy) Tuttocuoio | | On loan until 2017 | |
| 27 July 2016 | GK | (Italy) Giacomo Volpe | 20 | (Italy) Gubbio | Free | Contract expiration | |
| 28 July 2016 | DF | (Spain) Pol Lirola | 18 | (Italy) Sassuolo | | On loan until 2018 | |
| 28 July 2016 | FW | (Italy) Nicolò Pozzebon | 19 | (Netherlands) Groningen | | On loan until 2017 | |
| 1 August 2016 | FW | (Italy) Alberto Cerri | 20 | (Italy) SPAL | | On loan until 2017 | |
| 2 August 2016 | FW | (Guinea) Alhassane Soumah | 20 | (Belgium) Cercle Brugge | | On loan until 2017 | |
| 4 August 2016 | DF | (Italy) Giulio Parodi | 18 | (Italy) Pordenone | | On loan until 2018 | |
| 9 August 2016 | FW | (Italy) Cristian Pasquato | 27 | (Russia) KS Samara | | On loan until 2017 | |
| 9 August 2016 | DF | (China) Wang Yi | 18 | (Italy) Pro Vercelli | Free | Contract expiration | |
| 10 August 2016 | MF | (Italy) Francesco Cassata | 19 | (Italy) Ascoli | | On loan until 2017 | |
| 11 August 2016 | FW | (Argentina) Guido Vadalá | 19 | (Argentina) Unión | | On loan until 2017 | |
| 11 August 2016 | FW | (Italy) Lorenzo Rosseti | 22 | (Switzerland) Lugano | | On loan until 2017 | |
| 24 August 2016 | FW | (Italy) Cristian Bunino | 19 | (Italy) Siena | | On loan until 2017 | |
| 26 August 2016 | DF | (Italy) Nazzareno Belfasti | 23 | (Italy) Carrarese | | On loan until 2017 | |
| 26 August 2016 | MF | (Netherlands) Ouasim Bouy | 23 | (Italy) Palermo | | On loan until 2017 | |
| 29 August 2016 | DF | (Italy) Filippo Romagna | 19 | (Italy) Novara | | On loan until 2017 | |
| 31 August 2016 | MF | (Italy) Gregorio Luperini | 22 | (Italy) Pistoiese | | On loan until 2017 | |
| 31 August 2016 | MF | (Albania) Elvis Kabashi | 22 | (Italy) Pontedera | | On loan until 2017 | |
| 31 August 2016 | FW | (Senegal) Mame Baba Thiam | 24 | (Greece) PAOK | | On loan until 2017 | |
| 31 August 2016 | DF | (Switzerland) Joel Untersee | 22 | (Italy) Brescia | | On loan until 2017 | |

Total expenditure: €162,500,000

Total revenue: €163,700,000

Net income: ▲€1,200,000

=== Winter 2016–17 ===
==== In ====
| Date | Pos. | Player | Age | Moving from | Fee | Notes | Source |
|---|---|---|---|---|---|---|---|
| 3 January 2017 | MF | (Venezuela) Tomás Rincón | 28 | (Italy) Genoa | €8M | | |

==== Out ====
| Date | Pos. | Player | Age | Moving to | Fee | Notes | Source |
|---|---|---|---|---|---|---|---|
| 25 January 2017 | DF | (France) Patrice Evra | 35 | (France) Marseille | Free | | |
| 9 February 2017 | MF | (Brazil) Hernanes | 31 | Hebei China Fortune | €8M + €2M variables | | |

==== Other acquisitions ====
| Date | Pos. | Player | Age | Moving from | Fee | Notes | Source |
|---|---|---|---|---|---|---|---|
| 12 January 2017 | DF | (Italy) Mattia Caldara | 22 | (Italy) Atalanta | €15M | On loan at Atalanta until 30 June 2018 | |
| 31 January 2017 | FW | (Italy) Riccardo Orsolini | 20 | (Italy) Ascoli | €6M | On loan at Ascoli until 30 June 2017 | |
| 31 January 2017 | MF | (Brazil) Matheus Pereira | 18 | (Italy) Empoli | | On loan until 2017 with option to buy | |

==== Other disposals ====
| Date | Pos. | Player | Age | Moving to | Fee | Notes | Source |
|---|---|---|---|---|---|---|---|
| 4 January 2017 | FW | (Italy) Alberto Cerri | 20 | (Italy) Pescara | | On loan until 2017 | |
| 7 January 2017 | DF | (France) Yoan Severin | 19 | (Belgium) Zulte Waregem | Undisclosed | | |
| 9 January 2017 | FW | (Italy) Nicolò Pozzebon | 19 | (Italy) Piacenza | | On loan until 2017 | |
| 9 January 2017 | GK | (Italy) Alberto Brignoli | 25 | (Italy) Perugia | | On loan until 2017 | |
| 10 January 2017 | FW | (Italy) Davide Cais | 21 | (Italy) Carrarese | | On loan until 2018 | |
| 13 January 2017 | FW | (Senegal) Mame Baba Thiam | 24 | (Italy) Empoli | | On loan until 2017 with an option to buy | |
| 15 January 2017 | FW | (Italy) Simone Zaza | 25 | (Spain) Valencia | €2M | On loan until 2017, with obligation to buy for an extra €16M after 10 Liga appearances + €2M in variables | |
| 17 January 2017 | DF | (Italy) Claudio Zappa | 18 | (Italy) Pordenone | | On loan until 2017 | |
| 18 January 2017 | FW | (Italy) Stefano Padovan | 22 | (Italy) Pordenone | | On loan until 2017 | |
| 19 January 2017 | FW | (Italy) Eric Lanini | 20 | (Italy) Matera | | On loan until 2017 | |
| 19 January 2017 | GK | (Italy) Francesco Anacoura | 22 | (Italy) Ancona | | On loan until 2017 | |
| 25 January 2017 | MF | (Lithuania) Vykintas Slivka | 21 | (Italy) Ascoli | | On loan until 2017 with an option to buy | |
| 25 January 2017 | FW | (Morocco) Younes Bnou Marzouk | 20 | (Switzerland) Chiasso | | On loan until 2017 | |
| 31 January 2017 | MF | (Norway) Vajebah Sakor | 20 | (Netherlands) Willem II | | On loan until 2017 | |
| 31 January 2017 | DF | (Italy) Filippo Romagna | 18 | (Italy) Brescia | | On loan until 2017 with an option to buy | |
| 31 January 2017 | MF | (Netherlands) Ouasim Bouy | 23 | (Netherlands) PEC Zwolle | | On loan until 2017 | |

Total expenditure: €29,000,000

Total revenue: €10,000,000

Net income: ▼€19,000,000

=== Summer 2017 ===
==== In ====
| Date | Pos. | Player | Age | Moving from | Fee | Notes | Source |
|---|---|---|---|---|---|---|---|
| 21 April 2017 | MF | (Uruguay) Rodrigo Bentancur | 19 | (Argentina) Boca Juniors | €9.5M + variables | €1M for option to buy | |

==== Out ====
| Date | Pos. | Player | Age | Moving to | Fee | Notes | Source |

==== Other acquisitions ====
| Date | Pos. | Player | Age | Moving from | Fee | Notes | Source |
|---|---|---|---|---|---|---|---|
| 12 May 2017 | DF | (Morocco) Medhi Benatia | 30 | (Germany) Bayern Munich | €17M | Opted for option to sign permanently | |
| 22 May 2017 | FW | (Colombia) Juan Cuadrado | 28 | (England) Chelsea | €20M | Signed permanently from loan | |

==== Other disposals ====
| Date | Pos. | Player | Age | Moving to | Fee | Notes | Source |
|---|---|---|---|---|---|---|---|
| 10 April 2017 | FW | (Italy) Simone Zaza | 25 | (Spain) Valencia | €16M+ €2M variables | Valencia bought loan outright | |
| 27 April 2017 | FW | (France) Kingsley Coman | 20 | (Germany) Bayern Munich | €21M | Bayern Munich bought loan outright | |

== Pre-season and friendlies ==
| 23 July 2016 ICC | Melbourne Victory | 1–1 (4–3 p) | Juventus | Melbourne, Australia |
| 19:00 AEST (UTC+10) | Ingham 83' | Report | Blanco 58' | Stadium: Melbourne Cricket Ground; Attendance: 23,174; Referee: Hiroyuki Kimura (Japan) |
| | Penalties |
| | Valeri (penalty missed); Ingham (penalty scored); Baró (penalty scored); Galloway (penalty scored); Pasquali (penalty scored) | | (penalty scored) Marrone; (penalty scored) Vitale; (penalty missed) Macek; (penalty scored) Rosseti; (penalty missed) Padovan |

| 26 July 2016 ICC | Juventus | 2–1 | Tottenham Hotspur | Melbourne, Australia |
| 20:00 AEST (UTC+10) | Dybala 6'; Benatia 14' | Report | Lamela 67' | Stadium: Melbourne Cricket Ground; Attendance: 31,447; Referee: Ben Williams (Australia) |

| 30 July 2016 Friendly | South China | 1–2 | Juventus | So Kon Po, Hong Kong |
| 16:00 HKT (UTC+8) | Chan Siu Ki 21' | Report | Benatia 25'; Rosseti 82' | Stadium: Hong Kong Stadium; Attendance: 14,481; Referee: Lau Fong Hei (Hong Kong) |

| 7 August 2016 Betway Cup | West Ham United | 2–3 | Juventus | London, England |
| 13:00 BST (UTC+1) | Carroll 34', 54' | Report | Dybala 18'; Mandžukić 21'; Zaza 86' | Stadium: Olympic Stadium; Attendance: 53,966; Referee: Anthony Taylor (England) |

| 13 August 2016 Friendly | Juventus | 2–2 | Espanyol | Modena, Italy |
| 20:00 CEST (UTC+2) | Mandžukić 54'; Dybala 90' | Report | Baptistão 37'; Gerard 84' | Stadium: Stadio Alberto Braglia; Attendance: 10,000; Referee: Piero Giacomelli (Italy) |

| 17 August 2016 Villar Perosa | Juventus | 2–0^{[A]} | Juventus B | Villar Perosa |
| 17:00 CEST (UTC+2) | Higuaín 39'; Coccolo 48' (o.g.) | Report | | Attendance: 10,000; Referee: Pierluigi Pairetto (Italy) |

== Competitions ==
=== Supercoppa Italiana ===
| 23 December 2016 | Juventus | 1–1 (a.e.t.) (3–4 p) | AC Milan | Doha, Qatar |
| 19:30 AST | Chiellini 18'; Lichtsteiner (yellow card) 35'; Higuaín (yellow card) 120+1' | Report | Bonaventura 38'; Romagnoli (yellow card) 43'; Kucka (yellow card) 59'; De Sciglio (yellow card) 70' | Stadium: Jassim Bin Hamad Stadium; Attendance: 11,356; Referee: Antonio Damato |
| | Penalties |
| | Marchisio (penalty scored); Mandžukić (penalty missed); Higuaín (penalty scored); Khedira (penalty scored); Dybala (penalty missed) | | (penalty missed) Lapadula; (penalty scored) Bonaventura; (penalty scored) Kucka; (penalty scored) Suso; (penalty scored) Pašalić |

=== Serie A ===
==== League table ====
| Pos | Team | Pld | W | D | L | GF | GA | GD | Pts | Qualification or relegation |
|---|---|---|---|---|---|---|---|---|---|---|
| 1 | Juventus (C) | 38 | 29 | 4 | 5 | 77 | 27 | +50 | 91 | Qualification for the Champions League group stage |
| 2 | Roma | 38 | 28 | 3 | 7 | 90 | 38 | +52 | 87 | Qualification for the Champions League group stage |
| 3 | Napoli | 38 | 26 | 8 | 4 | 94 | 39 | +55 | 86 | Qualification for the Champions League play-off round |
| 4 | Atalanta | 38 | 21 | 9 | 8 | 62 | 41 | +21 | 72 | Qualification for the Europa League group stage (Note: Since the winners of the 2016–17 Coppa Italia, Juventus, qualified for European competition based on league position, the spot awarded to the cup winners (Europa League group stage) was passed to the fifth-placed team and the spot awarded to the fifth-placed team (Europa League third qualifying round) was passed to the sixth-placed team.) |
| 5 | Lazio | 38 | 21 | 7 | 10 | 74 | 51 | +23 | 70 | Qualification for the Europa League group stage |

Source: Serie A, Soccerway
Rules for classification: 1) Points; 2) Head-to-head points; 3) Head-to-head goal difference; 4) Goal difference; 5) Goals scored; 6) Draw.
(C) Champions

==== Results summary ====
| Overall | | | | | | | | Home | | | | | | Away | | | | | |
| Pld | W | D | L | GF | GA | GD | Pts | W | D | L | GF | GA | GD | W | D | L | GF | GA | GD |
|---|---|---|---|---|---|---|---|---|---|---|---|---|---|---|---|---|---|---|---|
| 38 | 29 | 4 | 5 | 77 | 27 | +50 | 91 | 18 | 1 | 0 | 48 | 9 | +39 | 11 | 3 | 5 | 29 | 18 | +11 |

Last updated: 27 May 2017.
Source: Competitive matches

==== Results by round ====
| Round | 1 | 2 | 3 | 4 | 5 | 6 | 7 | 8 | 9 | 10 | 11 | 12 | 13 | 14 | 15 | 16 | 17 | 18 | 19 | 20 | 21 | 22 | 23 | 24 | 25 | 26 | 27 | 28 | 29 | 30 | 31 | 32 | 33 | 34 | 35 | 36 | 37 | 38 |
|---|---|---|---|---|---|---|---|---|---|---|---|---|---|---|---|---|---|---|---|---|---|---|---|---|---|---|---|---|---|---|---|---|---|---|---|---|---|---|
| Ground | H | A | H | A | H | A | A | H | A | H | H | A | H | A | H | A | H | A | H | A | H | A | H | A | H | H | A | H | A | A | H | A | H | A | H | A | H | A |
| Result | W | W | W | L | W | W | W | W | L | W | W | W | W | L | W | W | W | W | W | L | W | W | W | W | W | W | D | W | W | D | W | W | W | D | D | L | W | W |
| Position | 6 | 2 | 1 | 2 | 1 | 1 | 1 | 1 | 1 | 1 | 1 | 1 | 1 | 1 | 1 | 1 | 1 | 1 | 1 | 1 | 1 | 1 | 1 | 1 | 1 | 1 | 1 | 1 | 1 | 1 | 1 | 1 | 1 | 1 | 1 | 1 | 1 | 1 |

Updated to match(es) played on 27 May 2017. Source: Competitive matches
A = Away; H = Home; W = Win; D = Draw; L = Loss

==== Matches ====
| 20 August 2016 1 | Juventus | 2–1 | Fiorentina | Turin |
| 20:45 CEST (UTC+02:00) | Khedira 37'; Barzagli (yellow card) 54'; Higuaín 75' | Report | Kalinić (yellow card) 39', (goal) 70'; Vecino (yellow card) 44'; Tomović (yellow card) 90+1' | Stadium: Juventus Stadium; Attendance: 40,184; Referee: Davide Massa |

| 27 August 2016 2 | Lazio | 0–1 | Juventus | Rome |
| 18:00 CEST (UTC+02:00) | Radu (yellow card) 18' | Report | Alex Sandro (yellow card) 43'; Lemina (yellow card) 61'; Khedira 66' | Stadium: Stadio Olimpico; Attendance: 36,000; Referee: Marco Guida |

| 10 September 2016 3 | Juventus | 3–1 | Sassuolo | Turin |
| 18:00 CEST (UTC+02:00) | Higuaín 5', 10'; Pjanić 27'; Benatia (yellow card) 85' | Report | Antei 33'; Gazzola (yellow card) 82'; Ricci (yellow card) 90+7' | Stadium: Juventus Stadium; Attendance: 39,519; Referee: Marco Di Bello |

| 18 September 2016 4 | Internazionale | 2–1 | Juventus | Milan |
| 18:00 CEST (UTC+02:00) | Medel (yellow card) 46'; Icardi 68'; Perišić 78'; Banega (yellow card) 84' (yellow-red card) 90'; Handanović (yellow card) 90+6' | Report | Lichtsteiner (yellow card) 19', (goal) 66'; Barzagli (yellow card) 29'; Asamoah (yellow card) 45+1' | Stadium: San Siro; Attendance: 76,484; Referee: Paolo Tagliavento |

| 21 September 2016 5 | Juventus | 4–0 | Cagliari | Turin |
| 20:45 CEST (UTC+02:00) | Rugani 14', (yellow card) 64'; Higuaín 33'; Dani Alves 39'; Ceppitelli 84' (o.g.) | Report | Di Gennaro (yellow card) 13'; Bittante (yellow card) 41'; Munari (yellow card) 90+2' | Stadium: Juventus Stadium; Attendance: 38,949; Referee: Maurizio Mariani |

| 24 September 2016 6 | Palermo | 0–1 | Juventus | Palermo |
| 18:00 CEST (UTC+02:00) | Goldaniga (yellow card) 6'; González (yellow card) 20'; Aleesami (yellow card) 35' | Report | Bonucci (yellow card) 3'; Mandžukić (yellow card) 9'; Dani Alves (yellow card) 27'; Goldaniga 49' (o.g.) | Stadium: Stadio Renzo Barbera; Attendance: 27,039; Referee: Paolo Valeri |

| 2 October 2016 7 | Empoli | 0–3 | Juventus | Empoli |
| 12:30 CEST (UTC+02:00) | Pasqual (yellow card) 62'; Mauri (yellow card) 69' | Report | Hernanes (yellow card) 50'; Dybala 65'; Higuaín 67', 70' | Stadium: Stadio Carlo Castellani; Attendance: 15,424; Referee: Paolo Mazzoleni |

| 15 October 2016 8 | Juventus | 2–1 | Udinese | Turin |
| 20:45 CEST (UTC+02:00) | Dybala 43', 51' (pen.); Hernanes (yellow card) 66' | Report | Jankto 30'; Wagué (yellow card) 45+1'; Perica (yellow card) 59' | Stadium: Juventus Stadium; Attendance: 39,590; Referee: Claudio Gavillucci |

| 22 October 2016 9 | AC Milan | 1–0 | Juventus | Milan |
| 20:45 CEST (UTC+02:00) | Kucka (yellow card) 44'; Donnarumma (yellow card) 50'; Locatelli 65', (yellow card) 79'; Poli (yellow card) 83' | Report | Bonucci (yellow card) 30'; Pjanić (yellow card) 38'; Dani Alves (yellow card) 76' | Stadium: San Siro; Attendance: 75,829; Referee: Nicola Rizzoli |

| 26 October 2016 10 | Juventus | 4–1 | Sampdoria | Turin |
| 20:45 CEST (UTC+02:00) | Mandžukić 4'; Chiellini 9', 87'; Pjanić 65' | Report | Silvestre (yellow card) 42'; Schick 57'; Barreto (yellow card) 62'; Cigarini (yellow card) 89' | Stadium: Juventus Stadium; Attendance: 38,417; Referee: Carmine Russo |

| 29 October 2016 11 | Juventus | 2–1 | Napoli | Turin |
| 20:45 CET (UTC+01:00) | Chiellini (yellow card) 21'; Alex Sandro (yellow card) 22'; Bonucci 50'; Hernanes (yellow card) 61'; Higuaín 70'; Mandžukić (yellow card) 85' | Report | Insigne (yellow card) 30'; Callejón 54' | Stadium: Juventus Stadium; Attendance: 41,409; Referee: Gianluca Rocchi |

| 6 November 2016 12 | Chievo | 1–2 | Juventus | Verona |
| 15:00 CET (UTC+01:00) | Dainelli (yellow card) 31'; Gobbi (yellow card) 34'; Radovanović (yellow card) 45+3'; Pellissier 66' (pen.); De Guzmán (yellow card) 82'; Cacciatore (yellow card) 90+1' | Report | Alex Sandro (yellow card) 40'; Cuadrado (yellow card) 48'; Mandžukić 53'; Lichtsteiner (yellow card) 65'; Pjanić 75'; Sturaro (yellow card) 80' | Stadium: Stadio Marc'Antonio Bentegodi; Attendance: 27,000; Referee: Paolo Valeri |

| 19 November 2016 13 | Juventus | 3–0 | Pescara | Turin |
| 20:45 CET (UTC+01:00) | Khedira 36'; Mandžukić 63'; Hernanes 69' | Report | Crescenzi (yellow card) 45'; Bruno (yellow card) 87' | Stadium: Juventus Stadium; Attendance: 40,347; Referee: Michael Fabbri |

| 27 November 2016 14 | Genoa | 3–1 | Juventus | Genoa |
| 15:00 CET (UTC+01:00) | Simeone 3', 13'; Rincón (yellow card) 24'; Alex Sandro 29' (o.g.); Cofie (yellow card) 82'; Biraschi (yellow card) 90+4' | Report | Cuadrado (yellow card) 77'; Pjanić 82'; Sturaro (yellow card) 90+1' | Stadium: Stadio Luigi Ferraris; Attendance: 27,153; Referee: Paolo Mazzoleni |

| 3 December 2016 15 | Juventus | 3–1 | Atalanta | Turin |
| 20:45 CET (UTC+01:00) | Alex Sandro 15'; Rugani 19', (yellow card) 35'; Lichtsteiner (yellow card) 31'; Mandžukić 64'; Sturaro (yellow card) 70' | Report | Freuler (yellow card) 26', (goal) 82'; Kessié (yellow card) 31' | Stadium: Juventus Stadium; Attendance: 41,209; Referee: Massimiliano Irrati |

| 11 December 2016 16 | Torino | 1–3 | Juventus | Turin |
| 15:00 CET (UTC+01:00) | Belotti 16'; Castán (yellow card) 35' | Report | Higuaín 28', 82'; Mandžukić (yellow card) 36'; Rugani (yellow card) 56'; Pjanić 90+2' | Stadium: Stadio Olimpico Grande Torino; Attendance: 26,436; Referee: Gianluca Rocchi |

| 17 December 2016 17 | Juventus | 1–0 | Roma | Turin |
| 20:45 CET (UTC+01:00) | Higuaín 14'; Rugani (yellow card) 26'; Alex Sandro (yellow card) 78'; Sturaro (yellow card) 90+3' | Report | De Rossi (yellow card) 12'; Džeko (yellow card) 16'; Gerson (yellow card) 28'; Nainggolan (yellow card) 89'; Rüdiger (yellow card) 90' | Stadium: Juventus Stadium; Attendance: 41,470; Referee: Daniele Orsato |

| 8 January 2017 19 | Juventus | 3–0 | Bologna | Turin |
| 20:45 CET (UTC+01:00) | Higuaín 7', 55'; Lichtsteiner (yellow card) 17'; Dybala 41' (pen.) | Report | Torosidis (yellow card) 35'; Di Francesco (yellow card) 45+1' | Stadium: Juventus Stadium; Attendance: 38,144; Referee: Maurizio Mariani |

| 15 January 2017 20 | Fiorentina | 2–1 | Juventus | Florence |
| 20:45 CET (UTC+01:00) | Vecino (yellow card) 29'; Kalinić 37', (yellow card) 90'; Chiesa (yellow card) 53'; Badelj 54' | Report | Sturaro (yellow card) 26'; Chiellini (yellow card) 33'; Higuaín 58'; Alex Sandro (yellow card) 82'; Bonucci (yellow card) 88'; Dybala (yellow card) 90+4' | Stadium: Stadio Artemio Franchi; Attendance: 34,085; Referee: Luca Banti |

| 22 January 2017 21 | Juventus | 2–0 | Lazio | Turin |
| 12:30 CET (UTC+01:00) | Dybala 5'; Higuaín 17' | Report | Radu (yellow card) 19'; Immobile (yellow card) 26'; Parolo (yellow card) 83' | Stadium: Juventus Stadium; Attendance: 39,917; Referee: Davide Massa |

| 29 January 2017 22 | Sassuolo | 0–2 | Juventus | Reggio Emilia |
| 15:00 CET (UTC+01:00) | Politano (yellow card) 23'; Mazzitelli (yellow card) 37'; Peluso (yellow card) 65' | Report | Higuaín 9'; Khedira 25'; Pjanić (yellow card) 58' | Stadium: Mapei Stadium – Città del Tricolore; Attendance: 21,584; Referee: Daniele Doveri |

| 5 February 2017 23 | Juventus | 1–0 | Internazionale | Turin |
| 20:45 CET (UTC+01:00) | Pjanić (yellow card) 23'; Cuadrado 45', (yellow card) 64'; Mandžukić (yellow card) 47'; Khedira (yellow card) 65'; Chiellini (yellow card) 74' | Report | Candreva (yellow card) 7'; Medel (yellow card) 43'; Handanović (yellow card) 90+4'; Perišić (red card) 90+4' | Stadium: Juventus Stadium; Attendance: 41,408; Referee: Nicola Rizzoli |

| 8 February 2017 18 | Crotone | 0–2 | Juventus | Crotone |
| 18:00 CET (UTC+01:00) | | Report | Mandžukić 60'; Bonucci (yellow card) 65'; Higuaín 74' | Stadium: Stadio Ezio Scida; Attendance: 15,354; Referee: Paolo Valeri |
Note: Postponed from 22 December 2016 due to the 2016 Supercoppa Italiana.

| 12 February 2017 24 | Cagliari | 0–2 | Juventus | Cagliari |
| 20:45 CET (UTC+01:00) | Barella (yellow card) 28' (yellow-red card) 67'; Isla (yellow card) 78'; Di Gennaro (yellow card) 86' | Report | Lichtsteiner (yellow card) 13'; Chiellini (yellow card) 14'; Higuaín 37', 47'; Marchisio (yellow card) 43'; Cuadrado (yellow card) 57'; Mandžukić (yellow card) 90+1' | Stadium: Stadio Sant'Elia; Attendance: 15,874; Referee: Gianpaolo Calvarese |

| 17 February 2017 25 | Juventus | 4–1 | Palermo | Turin |
| 20:45 CET (UTC+01:00) | Marchisio 13', (yellow card) 36'; Dybala 40', 89'; Higuaín 63' | Report | Goldaniga (yellow card) 4'; Chochev 90+3' | Stadium: Juventus Stadium; Attendance: 39,247; Referee: Marco Di Bello |

| 25 February 2017 26 | Juventus | 2–0 | Empoli | Turin |
| 20:45 CET (UTC+01:00) | Skorupski 52' (o.g.); Alex Sandro 65' | Report | Bellusci (yellow card) 82' | Stadium: Juventus Stadium; Attendance: 39,276; Referee: Maurizio Mariani |

| 5 March 2017 27 | Udinese | 1–1 | Juventus | Udine |
| 15:00 CET (UTC+01:00) | Zapata 37'; Jankto (yellow card) 45+1'; Hallfreðsson (yellow card) 66' | Report | Bonucci 60'; Cuadrado (yellow card) 68'; Pjaca (yellow card) 77' | Stadium: Stadio Friuli; Attendance: 26,278; Referee: Antonio Damato |

| 10 March 2017 28 | Juventus | 2–1 | AC Milan | Turin |
| 20:45 CET (UTC+01:00) | Benatia 30', (yellow card) 36'; Pjanić (yellow card) 78'; Khedira (yellow card) 87'; Dybala 90+7' (pen.) | Report | Pašalić (yellow card) 23'; Deulofeu (yellow card) 39'; Bacca 43'; Ocampos (yellow card) 57'; Romagnoli (yellow card) 62'; Sosa (yellow card) 89' (yellow-red card) 90+3' | Stadium: Juventus Stadium; Attendance: 40,573; Referee: Davide Massa |

| 19 March 2017 29 | Sampdoria | 0–1 | Juventus | Genoa |
| 15:00 CET (UTC+01:00) | Regini (yellow card) 83' | Report | Cuadrado 7'; Dani Alves (yellow card) 83' | Stadium: Stadio Luigi Ferraris; Attendance: 26,127; Referee: Paolo Tagliavento |

| 2 April 2017 30 | Napoli | 1–1 | Juventus | Naples |
| 20:45 CEST (UTC+02:00) | Insigne (yellow card) 37'; Hamšík 60' | Report | Khedira 7' | Stadium: Stadio San Paolo; Attendance: 53,085; Referee: Daniele Orsato |

| 8 April 2017 31 | Juventus | 2–0 | Chievo | Turin |
| 20:45 CEST (UTC+02:00) | Higuaín 23', 84'; Bonucci (yellow card) 79' | Report | Cacciatore (yellow card) 18'; Spolli (yellow card) 55' | Stadium: Juventus Stadium; Attendance: 39,477; Referee: Michael Fabbri |

| 15 April 2017 32 | Pescara | 0–2 | Juventus | Pescara |
| 15:00 CEST (UTC+02:00) | Muntari (yellow card) 3'; Coulibaly (yellow card) 39'; Caprari (yellow card) 59'; Coda (yellow card) 89' | Report | Pjanić (yellow card) 12'; Higuaín 22', 43' | Stadium: Stadio Adriatico – Giovanni Cornacchia; Attendance: 19,938; Referee: Marco Di Bello |

| 23 April 2017 33 | Juventus | 4–0 | Genoa | Turin |
| 20:45 CEST (UTC+02:00) | Muñoz 17' (o.g.); Dybala 18'; Mandžukić 41'; Bonucci 64' | Report | Burdisso (yellow card) 34' | Stadium: Juventus Stadium; Attendance: 39,594; Referee: Gianpaolo Calvarese |

| 28 April 2017 34 | Atalanta | 2–2 | Juventus | Bergamo |
| 20:45 CEST (UTC+02:00) | Conti 45', (yellow card) 80'; Freuler (yellow card) 49', (goal) 89'; Gómez (yellow card) 85' | Report | Spinazzola 50' (o.g.); Cuadrado (yellow card) 75'; Dani Alves 83', (yellow card) 83' | Stadium: Stadio Atleti Azzurri d'Italia; Attendance: 19,650; Referee: Marco Guida |

| 6 May 2017 35 | Juventus | 1–1 | Torino | Turin |
| 20:45 CEST (UTC+02:00) | Asamoah (yellow card) 51'; Dybala (yellow card) 53'; Cuadrado (yellow card) 76'; Higuaín 90+2' | Report | Moretti (yellow card) 13'; Acquah (yellow card) 38' (yellow-red card) 57'; Molinaro (yellow card) 42'; Ljajić 52' | Stadium: Juventus Stadium; Attendance: 40,462; Referee: Paolo Valeri |

| 14 May 2017 36 | Roma | 3–1 | Juventus | Rome |
| 20:45 CEST (UTC+02:00) | De Rossi 25', (yellow card) 50'; Fazio (yellow card) 46'; El Shaarawy 56'; Paredes (yellow card) 60'; Nainggolan 65' | Report | Lemina 21'; Benatia (yellow card) 89'; Higuaín (yellow card) 90+2' | Stadium: Stadio Olimpico; Attendance: 53,023; Referee: Luca Banti |

| 21 May 2017 37 | Juventus | 3–0 | Crotone | Turin |
| 15:00 CEST (UTC+02:00) | Mandžukić 12'; Dybala 39'; Alex Sandro 83'; Dani Alves (yellow card) 89' | Report | Martella (yellow card) 76' | Stadium: Juventus Stadium; Attendance: 39,596; Referee: Paolo Mazzoleni |

| 27 May 2017 38 | Bologna | 1–2 | Juventus | Bologna |
| 18:00 CEST (UTC+02:00) | Taïder 52'; Viviani (yellow card) 65'; Okwonkwo (yellow card) 82'; Gastaldello (yellow card) 90+1' | Report | Dybala 70'; Cuadrado (yellow card) 79'; Kean 90+4' | Stadium: Stadio Renato Dall'Ara; Attendance: 29,233; Referee: Maurizio Mariani |

=== Coppa Italia ===
| 11 January 2017 Round of 16 | Juventus | 3–2 | Atalanta | Turin |
| 20:45 CET (UTC+01:00) | Dybala 22'; Mandžukić 34'; Pjanić 75' (pen.) | Report | Grassi (yellow card) 29'; Toloi (yellow card) 64'; Latte Lath (yellow card) 70', (goal) 81'; Konko 72'; Freuler (yellow card) 90+4' | Stadium: Juventus Stadium; Attendance: 38,023; Referee: Piero Giacomelli |

| 25 January 2017 Quarter-finals | Juventus | 2–1 | AC Milan | Turin |
| 20:45 CET (UTC+01:00) | Dybala 10'; Pjanić 21', (yellow card) 30'; Mandžukić (yellow card) 44'; Bonucci (yellow card) 69'; Alex Sandro (yellow card) 71' | Report | Kucka (yellow card) 20'; Locatelli (yellow card) 33' (yellow-red card) 54'; Bacca 53'; Antonelli (yellow card) 72'; Zapata (yellow card) 74' | Stadium: Juventus Stadium; Attendance: 40,142; Referee: Massimiliano Irrati |

| 28 February 2017 Semi-finals; First leg | Juventus | 3–1 | Napoli | Turin |
| 20:45 CET (UTC+01:00) | Asamoah (yellow card) 26'; Lichtsteiner (yellow card) 40'; Dybala 47' (pen.), 69' (pen.); Higuaín 64' | Report | Diawara (yellow card) 21'; Callejón 36'; Milik (yellow card) 38'; Rog (yellow card) 58'; Maggio (yellow card) 68'; Reina (yellow card) 68' | Stadium: Juventus Stadium; Attendance: 38,398; Referee: Paolo Valeri |

| 5 April 2017 Semi-finals; Second leg | Napoli | 3–2 (4–5 agg.) | Juventus | Naples |
| 20:45 CEST (UTC+02:00) | Koulibaly (yellow card) 28'; Callejón (yellow card) 30'; Hamšík 53'; Mertens 61'; Diawara (yellow card) 65'; Insigne 67'; Maksimović (yellow card) 76'; Ghoulam (yellow card) 80' | Report | Rincón (yellow card) 25'; Cuadrado (yellow card) 30'; Higuaín 32', 59'; Pjanić (yellow card) 86'; Dani Alves (yellow card) 88' | Stadium: Stadio San Paolo; Attendance: 48,421; Referee: Luca Banti |

| 17 May 2017 Final | Juventus | 2–0 | Lazio | Rome |
| 21:00 CEST (UTC+02:00) | Dani Alves 12', (yellow card) 86'; Bonucci 24' | Report | | Stadium: Stadio Olimpico; Attendance: 64,098; Referee: Paolo Tagliavento |

=== UEFA Champions League ===
==== Group stage ====
| Pos | Team | Pld | W | D | L | GF | GA | GD | Pts | Qualification | JUV | SEV | LYO | DZG |
|---|---|---|---|---|---|---|---|---|---|---|---|---|---|---|
| 1 | (Italy) Juventus | 6 | 4 | 2 | 0 | 11 | 2 | +9 | 14 | Advance to knockout phase | — | 0–0 | 1–1 | 2–0 |
| 2 | (Spain) Sevilla | 6 | 3 | 2 | 1 | 7 | 3 | +4 | 11 | Advance to knockout phase | 1–3 | — | 1–0 | 4–0 |
| 3 | (France) Lyon | 6 | 2 | 2 | 2 | 5 | 3 | +2 | 8 | Transfer to Europa League | 0–1 | 0–0 | — | 3–0 |
| 4 | (Croatia) Dinamo Zagreb | 6 | 0 | 0 | 6 | 0 | 15 | −15 | 0 | | 0–4 | 0–1 | 0–1 | — |

Source: UEFA
Rules for classification: Group stage tiebreakers

| 14 September 2016 1 | Juventus (Italy) | 0–0 | (Spain) Sevilla | Turin, Italy |
| 20:45 CEST (UTC+02:00) | | Report | Nzonzi (yellow card) 36'; Iborra (yellow card) 40'; Rami (yellow card) 45+2' | Stadium: Juventus Stadium; Attendance: 33,261; Referee: Deniz Aytekin (Germany) |

| 27 September 2016 2 | Dinamo Zagreb (Croatia) | 0–4 | (Italy) Juventus | Zagreb, Croatia |
| 20:45 CEST (UTC+02:00) | | Report | Pjanić 24'; Higuaín 31'; Dybala 57'; Dani Alves 85' | Stadium: Stadion Maksimir; Attendance: 23,875; Referee: Jorge Sousa (Portugal) |

| 18 October 2016 3 | Lyon (France) | 0–1 | (Italy) Juventus | Décines-Charpieu, France |
| 20:45 CEST (UTC+02:00) | Rafael (yellow card) 29'; Lacazette (penalty missed) 35' (yellow card) 60'; Darder (yellow card) 52'; Diakhaby (yellow card) 73'; Ferri (yellow card) 83' | Report | Bonucci (yellow card) 34'; Lemina (yellow card) 41' (yellow-red card) 54'; Cuadrado 76' | Stadium: Parc Olympique Lyonnais; Attendance: 53,907; Referee: Szymon Marciniak (Poland) |

| 2 November 2016 4 | Juventus (Italy) | 1–1 | (France) Lyon | Turin, Italy |
| 20:45 CET (UTC+01:00) | Higuaín 13' (pen.); Pjanić (yellow card) 38'; Barzagli (yellow card) 58'; Marchisio (yellow card) 84'; Sturaro (yellow card) 89' | Report | Tolisso 85'; Darder (yellow card) 90+1'; Ghezzal (yellow card) 90+4' | Stadium: Juventus Stadium; Attendance: 40,356; Referee: Björn Kuipers (Netherlands) |

| 22 November 2016 5 | Sevilla (Spain) | 1–3 | (Italy) Juventus | Seville, Spain |
| 20:45 CET (UTC+01:00) | Pareja 9'; Vázquez (yellow card) 31' (yellow-red card) 36'; Mercado (yellow card) 37'; Iborra (yellow card) 90+4' | Report | Mandžukić (yellow card) 25', (goal) 90+4'; Khedira (yellow card) 42'; Marchisio 45+2' (pen.); Evra (yellow card) 65'; Cuadrado (yellow card) 72'; Bonucci 84' | Stadium: Ramón Sánchez Pizjuán; Attendance: 38,942; Referee: Mark Clattenburg (England) |

| 7 December 2016 6 | Juventus (Italy) | 2–0 | (Croatia) Dinamo Zagreb | Turin, Italy |
| 20:45 CET (UTC+01:00) | Higuaín (yellow card) 15', (goal) 52'; Evra (yellow card) 54'; Rugani 73' | Report | Ćorić (yellow card) 61' | Stadium: Juventus Stadium; Attendance: 39,380; Referee: Anthony Taylor (England) |

==== Knockout phase ====
===== Round of 16 =====
| 22 February 2017 First leg | Porto (Portugal) | 0–2 | (Italy) Juventus | Porto, Portugal |
| 20:45 CET (UTC+01:00) | Telles (yellow card) 25' (yellow-red card) 27'; Pereira (yellow card) 45+2'; Herrera (yellow card) 85'; Marcano (yellow card) 89' | Report | Lichtsteiner (yellow card) 50'; Pjaca 72'; Dani Alves 74' | Stadium: Estádio do Dragão; Attendance: 49,229; Referee: Felix Brych (Germany) |

| 14 March 2017 Second leg | Juventus (Italy) | 1–0 (3–0 agg.) | (Portugal) Porto | Turin, Italy |
| 20:45 CET (UTC+01:00) | Cuadrado (yellow card) 12'; Dybala 42' (pen.) | Report | Layún (yellow card) 30'; André André (yellow card) 36'; Pereira (red card) 40' | Stadium: Juventus Stadium; Attendance: 41,161; Referee: Ovidiu Hațegan (Romania) |

===== Quarter-finals =====
| 11 April 2017 First leg | Juventus (Italy) | 3–0 | (Spain) Barcelona | Turin, Italy |
| 20:45 CEST (UTC+02:00) | Dybala 7', 22'; Dani Alves (yellow card) 28'; Chiellini 55'; Mandžukić (yellow card) 63'; Khedira (yellow card) 74'; Lemina (yellow card) 90+1' | Report | L. Suárez (yellow card) 53'; Iniesta (yellow card) 57'; Umtiti (yellow card) 90+1' | Stadium: Juventus Stadium; Attendance: 41,092; Referee: Szymon Marciniak (Poland) |

| 19 April 2017 Second leg | Barcelona (Spain) | 0–0 (0–3 agg.) | (Italy) Juventus | Barcelona, Spain |
| 20:45 CEST (UTC+02:00) | Iniesta (yellow card) 41'; Neymar (yellow card) 44' | Report | Chiellini (yellow card) 57'; Khedira (yellow card) 64' | Stadium: Camp Nou; Attendance: 96,290; Referee: Björn Kuipers (Netherlands) |

===== Semi-finals =====
| 3 May 2017 First leg | Monaco (France) | 0–2 | (Italy) Juventus | Monaco |
| 20:45 CEST (UTC+02:00) | Fabinho (yellow card) 37' | Report | Bonucci (yellow card) 21'; Higuaín 29', 59'; Marchisio (yellow card) 58'; Chiellini (yellow card) 69' | Stadium: Stade Louis II; Attendance: 16,762; Referee: Antonio Mateu Lahoz (Spain) |

| 9 May 2017 Second leg | Juventus (Italy) | 2–1 (4–1 agg.) | (France) Monaco | Turin, Italy |
| 20:45 CEST (UTC+02:00) | Mandžukić 33', (yellow card) 90+1'; Dani Alves 44'; Bonucci (yellow card) 74' | Report | Falcao (yellow card) 40'; Mendy (yellow card) 51'; Mbappé 69' | Stadium: Juventus Stadium; Attendance: 40,244; Referee: Björn Kuipers (Netherlands) |

===== Final =====
| 3 June 2017 Final | Juventus (Italy) | 1–4 | (Spain) Real Madrid | Cardiff, Wales |
| 20:45 CEST (UTC+02:00) | Dybala (yellow card) 12'; Mandžukić 27'; Pjanić (yellow card) 66'; Alex Sandro (yellow card) 70'; Cuadrado (yellow card) 72' (yellow-red card) 84' | Report | Ronaldo 20', 64'; Ramos (yellow card) 31'; Carvajal (yellow card) 42'; Kroos (yellow card) 53'; Casemiro 61'; Asensio 90' | Stadium: Millennium Stadium; Attendance: 65,842; Referee: Felix Brych (Germany) |

== Statistics ==
=== Appearances and goals ===
| No. | Pos | Nat | Player | Total | | Serie A | | Supercoppa Italiana | | Coppa Italia | | Champions League | |
| No. | Pos | Nat | Player | Apps | Goals | Apps | Goals | Apps | Goals | Apps | Goals | Apps | Goals |
Goalkeepers
| 1 | GK | (Italy) ITA | Gianluigi Buffon | 43 | 0 | 30 | 0 | 1 | 0 | 0 | 0 | 12 | 0 |
| 25 | GK | (Brazil) BRA | Neto | 14 | 0 | 7+1 | 0 | 0 | 0 | 5 | 0 | 1 | 0 |
| 32 | GK | (Italy) ITA | Emil Audero | 1 | 0 | 1 | 0 | 0 | 0 | 0 | 0 | 0 | 0 |
Defenders
| 3 | DF | (Italy) ITA | Giorgio Chiellini | 33 | 4 | 20+1 | 2 | 1 | 1 | 2 | 0 | 8+1 | 1 |
| 4 | DF | (Morocco) MAR | Medhi Benatia | 21 | 1 | 14+1 | 1 | 0 | 0 | 1 | 0 | 2+3 | 0 |
| 12 | DF | (Brazil) BRA | Alex Sandro | 43 | 3 | 25+2 | 3 | 1 | 0 | 2+2 | 0 | 9+2 | 0 |
| 15 | DF | (Italy) ITA | Andrea Barzagli | 39 | 0 | 17+6 | 0 | 0 | 0 | 4+1 | 0 | 8+3 | 0 |
| 19 | DF | (Italy) ITA | Leonardo Bonucci | 45 | 5 | 26+3 | 3 | 0 | 0 | 4+1 | 1 | 11 | 1 |
| 23 | DF | (Brazil) BRA | Dani Alves | 33 | 5 | 15+4 | 1 | 0 | 0 | 2 | 1 | 11+1 | 3 |
| 24 | DF | (Italy) ITA | Daniele Rugani | 20 | 3 | 11+4 | 2 | 1 | 0 | 2 | 0 | 2 | 1 |
| 26 | DF | (Switzerland) SUI | Stephan Lichtsteiner | 30 | 1 | 22+4 | 1 | 1 | 0 | 2 | 0 | 1 | 0 |
Midfielders
| 5 | MF | (Bosnia and Herzegovina) BIH | Miralem Pjanić | 47 | 8 | 25+5 | 5 | 1 | 0 | 3+1 | 2 | 11+1 | 1 |
| 6 | MF | (Germany) GER | Sami Khedira | 46 | 5 | 31 | 5 | 1 | 0 | 3 | 0 | 11 | 0 |
| 8 | MF | (Italy) ITA | Claudio Marchisio | 29 | 2 | 15+3 | 1 | 1 | 0 | 2 | 0 | 5+3 | 1 |
| 18 | MF | (Gabon) GAB | Mario Lemina | 29 | 1 | 8+11 | 1 | 0+1 | 0 | 0+2 | 0 | 3+4 | 0 |
| 22 | MF | (Ghana) GHA | Kwadwo Asamoah | 24 | 0 | 16+2 | 0 | 0 | 0 | 3 | 0 | 2+1 | 0 |
| 27 | MF | (Italy) ITA | Stefano Sturaro | 28 | 0 | 12+9 | 0 | 1 | 0 | 1+1 | 0 | 1+3 | 0 |
| 28 | MF | (Venezuela) VEN | Tomás Rincón | 19 | 0 | 2+11 | 0 | 0 | 0 | 3 | 0 | 0+3 | 0 |
| 38 | MF | (Italy) ITA | Rolando Mandragora | 1 | 0 | 0+1 | 0 | 0 | 0 | 0 | 0 | 0 | 0 |
Forwards
| 7 | FW | (Colombia) COL | Juan Cuadrado | 45 | 3 | 21+9 | 2 | 0 | 0 | 2+1 | 0 | 6+6 | 1 |
| 9 | FW | (Argentina) ARG | Gonzalo Higuaín | 55 | 32 | 32+6 | 24 | 1 | 0 | 4 | 3 | 12 | 5 |
| 17 | FW | (Croatia) CRO | Mario Mandžukić | 51 | 11 | 29+6 | 7 | 1 | 0 | 4 | 1 | 10+1 | 3 |
| 20 | FW | (Croatia) CRO | Marko Pjaca | 20 | 1 | 3+11 | 0 | 0 | 0 | 0+2 | 0 | 0+4 | 1 |
| 21 | FW | (Argentina) ARG | Paulo Dybala | 48 | 19 | 26+5 | 11 | 0+1 | 0 | 5 | 4 | 10+1 | 4 |
| 34 | FW | (Italy) ITA | Moise Kean | 4 | 1 | 0+3 | 1 | 0 | 0 | 0 | 0 | 0+1 | 0 |
Players transferred out during the season
| 11 | MF | (Brazil) BRA | Hernanes | 13 | 1 | 8+2 | 1 | 0 | 0 | 1 | 0 | 1+1 | 0 |
| 33 | DF | (France) FRA | Patrice Evra | 13 | 0 | 3+3 | 0 | 0+1 | 0 | 0 | 0 | 6 | 0 |

Last updated: 3 June 2017
Source: Competitions

=== Goalscorers ===
| Rank | No. | Pos | Nat | Name | Serie A | Supercoppa | Coppa Italia | UEFA CL | Total |
|---|---|---|---|---|---|---|---|---|---|
| 1 | 9 | FW | (Argentina) | Gonzalo Higuaín | 24 | 0 | 3 | 5 | 32 |
| 2 | 21 | FW | (Argentina) | Paulo Dybala | 11 | 0 | 4 | 4 | 19 |
| 3 | 17 | FW | (Croatia) | Mario Mandžukić | 7 | 0 | 1 | 3 | 11 |
| 4 | 5 | MF | (Bosnia and Herzegovina) | Miralem Pjanić | 5 | 0 | 2 | 1 | 8 |
| 5 | 23 | DF | (Brazil) | Dani Alves | 2 | 0 | 1 | 3 | 6 |
| 6 | 6 | MF | (Germany) | Sami Khedira | 5 | 0 | 0 | 0 | 5 |
| 6 | 19 | DF | (Italy) | Leonardo Bonucci | 3 | 0 | 1 | 1 | 5 |
| 8 | 3 | DF | (Italy) | Giorgio Chiellini | 2 | 1 | 0 | 1 | 4 |
| 9 | 7 | FW | (Colombia) | Juan Cuadrado | 2 | 0 | 0 | 1 | 3 |
| 9 | 12 | DF | (Brazil) | Alex Sandro | 3 | 0 | 0 | 0 | 3 |
| 9 | 24 | DF | (Italy) | Daniele Rugani | 2 | 0 | 0 | 1 | 3 |
| 12 | 8 | MF | (Italy) | Claudio Marchisio | 1 | 0 | 0 | 1 | 2 |
| 13 | 4 | DF | (Morocco) | Medhi Benatia | 1 | 0 | 0 | 0 | 1 |
| 13 | 11 | MF | (Brazil) | Hernanes | 1 | 0 | 0 | 0 | 1 |
| 13 | 18 | MF | (Gabon) | Mario Lemina | 1 | 0 | 0 | 0 | 1 |
| 13 | 20 | FW | (Croatia) | Marko Pjaca | 0 | 0 | 0 | 1 | 1 |
| 13 | 26 | DF | (Switzerland) | Stephan Lichtsteiner | 1 | 0 | 0 | 0 | 1 |
| 13 | 34 | FW | (Italy) | Moise Kean | 1 | 0 | 0 | 0 | 1 |
| Own goal | | | | | 5 | 0 | 0 | 0 | 5 |
| Totals | | | | | 77 | 1 | 12 | 22 | 112 |

Last updated: 3 June 2017

=== Disciplinary record ===
| No. | Pos | Nat | Name | Serie A | | | Supercoppa | | | Coppa Italia | | | UEFA CL | | | Total | | |
| No. | Pos | Nat | Name | Yellow card | (yellow card) (yellow-red card) | Red card | Yellow card | (yellow card) (yellow-red card) | Red card | Yellow card | (yellow card) (yellow-red card) | Red card | Yellow card | (yellow card) (yellow-red card) | Red card | Yellow card | (yellow card) (yellow-red card) | Red card |
| 1 | GK | (Italy) | Gianluigi Buffon | 0 | 0 | 0 | 0 | 0 | 0 | 0 | 0 | 0 | 0 | 0 | 0 | 0 | 0 | 0 |
| 25 | GK | (Brazil) | Neto | 0 | 0 | 0 | 0 | 0 | 0 | 0 | 0 | 0 | 0 | 0 | 0 | 0 | 0 | 0 |
| 32 | GK | (Italy) | Emil Audero | 0 | 0 | 0 | 0 | 0 | 0 | 0 | 0 | 0 | 0 | 0 | 0 | 0 | 0 | 0 |
| 3 | DF | (Italy) | Giorgio Chiellini | 4 | 0 | 0 | 0 | 0 | 0 | 0 | 0 | 0 | 1 | 0 | 0 | 5 | 0 | 0 |
| 4 | DF | (Morocco) | Medhi Benatia | 3 | 0 | 0 | 0 | 0 | 0 | 0 | 0 | 0 | 0 | 0 | 0 | 3 | 0 | 0 |
| 12 | DF | (Brazil) | Alex Sandro | 5 | 0 | 0 | 0 | 0 | 0 | 1 | 0 | 0 | 1 | 0 | 0 | 7 | 0 | 0 |
| 15 | DF | (Italy) | Andrea Barzagli | 2 | 0 | 0 | 0 | 0 | 0 | 0 | 0 | 0 | 1 | 0 | 0 | 3 | 0 | 0 |
| 19 | DF | (Italy) | Leonardo Bonucci | 5 | 0 | 0 | 0 | 0 | 0 | 1 | 0 | 0 | 2 | 0 | 0 | 9 | 0 | 0 |
| 23 | DF | (Brazil) | Dani Alves | 5 | 0 | 0 | 0 | 0 | 0 | 2 | 0 | 0 | 1 | 0 | 0 | 7 | 0 | 0 |
| 24 | DF | (Italy) | Daniele Rugani | 4 | 0 | 0 | 0 | 0 | 0 | 0 | 0 | 0 | 0 | 0 | 0 | 4 | 0 | 0 |
| 26 | DF | (Switzerland) | Stephan Lichtsteiner | 5 | 0 | 0 | 1 | 0 | 0 | 1 | 0 | 0 | 1 | 0 | 0 | 8 | 0 | 0 |
| 33 | DF | (France) | Patrice Evra | 0 | 0 | 0 | 0 | 0 | 0 | 0 | 0 | 0 | 2 | 0 | 0 | 2 | 0 | 0 |
| 5 | MF | (Bosnia and Herzegovina) | Miralem Pjanić | 5 | 0 | 0 | 0 | 0 | 0 | 2 | 0 | 0 | 2 | 0 | 0 | 9 | 0 | 0 |
| 6 | MF | (Germany) | Sami Khedira | 2 | 0 | 0 | 0 | 0 | 0 | 0 | 0 | 0 | 3 | 0 | 0 | 5 | 0 | 0 |
| 8 | MF | (Italy) | Claudio Marchisio | 2 | 0 | 0 | 0 | 0 | 0 | 0 | 0 | 0 | 1 | 0 | 0 | 3 | 0 | 0 |
| 11 | MF | (Brazil) | Hernanes | 3 | 0 | 0 | 0 | 0 | 0 | 0 | 0 | 0 | 0 | 0 | 0 | 3 | 0 | 0 |
| 18 | MF | (Gabon) | Mario Lemina | 1 | 0 | 0 | 0 | 0 | 0 | 0 | 0 | 0 | 1 | 1 | 0 | 2 | 1 | 0 |
| 22 | MF | (Ghana) | Kwadwo Asamoah | 2 | 0 | 0 | 0 | 0 | 0 | 1 | 0 | 0 | 0 | 0 | 0 | 3 | 0 | 0 |
| 27 | MF | (Italy) | Stefano Sturaro | 5 | 0 | 0 | 0 | 0 | 0 | 0 | 0 | 0 | 1 | 0 | 0 | 6 | 0 | 0 |
| 28 | MF | (Venezuela) | Tomás Rincón | 0 | 0 | 0 | 0 | 0 | 0 | 1 | 0 | 0 | 0 | 0 | 0 | 1 | 0 | 0 |
| 7 | FW | (Colombia) | Juan Cuadrado | 8 | 0 | 0 | 0 | 0 | 0 | 0 | 0 | 0 | 1 | 1 | 0 | 9 | 1 | 0 |
| 9 | FW | (Argentina) | Gonzalo Higuaín | 1 | 0 | 0 | 1 | 0 | 0 | 0 | 0 | 0 | 1 | 0 | 0 | 3 | 0 | 0 |
| 17 | FW | (Croatia) | Mario Mandžukić | 5 | 0 | 0 | 0 | 0 | 0 | 1 | 0 | 0 | 3 | 0 | 0 | 9 | 0 | 0 |
| 20 | FW | (Croatia) | Marko Pjaca | 1 | 0 | 0 | 0 | 0 | 0 | 0 | 0 | 0 | 0 | 0 | 0 | 1 | 0 | 0 |
| 21 | FW | (Argentina) | Paulo Dybala | 1 | 0 | 0 | 0 | 0 | 0 | 0 | 0 | 0 | 1 | 0 | 0 | 2 | 0 | 0 |
| 34 | FW | (Italy) | Moise Kean | 0 | 0 | 0 | 0 | 0 | 0 | 0 | 0 | 0 | 0 | 0 | 0 | 0 | 0 | 0 |
| Totals | | | | 69 | 0 | 0 | 2 | 0 | 0 | 10 | 0 | 0 | 27 | 2 | 0 | 108 | 2 | 0 |

Last updated: 3 June 2017

== Notes ==
A. The match was called at the 57th minute due to the annual tradition of pitch invasion.
