= Mario Mandžukić =

Croatian footballer (born 1986)

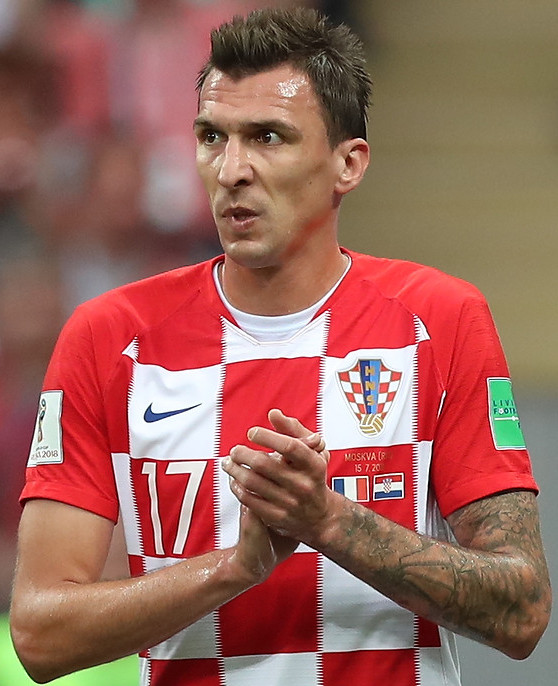
- Mandžukić with Croatia in 2018

Personal information
- Full name: Mario Mandžukić
- Date of birth: 21 May 1986 (age 40)
- Place of birth: Slavonski Brod, SR Croatia, Yugoslavia
- Height: 1.90 m (6 ft 3 in)
- Position: Striker

Youth career
- 1992–1996: TSF Ditzingen
- 1996–2003: Marsonia
- 2003–2004: Željezničar Slavonski Brod

Senior career*
Years	Team	Apps	(Gls)
2004–2005	Marsonia	23	(14)
2005–2007	NK Zagreb	51	(14)
2007–2010	Dinamo Zagreb	81	(41)
2010–2012	VfL Wolfsburg	56	(20)
2012–2014	Bayern Munich	54	(33)
2014–2015	Atlético Madrid	28	(12)
2015–2019	Juventus	118	(31)
2019–2020	Al-Duhail	5	(0)
2021	AC Milan	10	(0)
Total		426	(166)

International career
2004–2005	Croatia U19	10	(3)
2007	Croatia U20	1	(1)
2006–2008	Croatia U21	9	(1)
2007–2018	Croatia	89	(33)

Managerial career
- 2021–2024: Croatia (assistant coach)
Medal record
Men's football
Representing Croatia
FIFA World Cup
Runner-up	2018 Russia
Representing Croatia (as assistant coach)
FIFA World Cup
Third place	2022 Qatar
- * Club domestic league appearances and goals

Mario Mandžukić (Croatian pronunciation: [mâːrio mǎndʒukitɕ]; born 21 May 1986) is a Croatian football coach and a former player who was most recently an assistant coach for the Croatian national team. As a player, he played as a forward and was known for his aggressiveness, defensive contribution, and aerial prowess.

Starting his career in 2004 at hometown club Marsonia, Mandžukić then moved to two Zagreb-based clubs: NK Zagreb in 2005 and Dinamo Zagreb in 2007. He was Croatian First League top goalscorer in the 2008–09 season. After joining VfL Wolfsburg in 2010, Mandžukić moved to fellow-Bundesliga side Bayern Munich in 2012. He helped Bayern win their first continental treble (Bundesliga, DFB-Pokal, Champions League) in his first season, and became the first Croatian to score in a Champions League final. After winning a domestic double the following season, he left Bayern for La Liga club Atlético Madrid in 2014, and a season later was signed by Juventus in the Serie A. Mandžukić won four league titles and three Coppa Italia titles with Juventus, and reached the 2017 Champions League final. He left Juventus in December 2019 for Qatari side Al-Duhail, but returned to Italy in January 2021, signing with AC Milan. He retired in September of the same year.

At the international level, Mandžukić debuted for Croatia in November 2007 under manager Slaven Bilić. He participated in four major tournaments with his national side, Euro 2012, the 2014 World Cup, Euro 2016, and the 2018 World Cup, reaching the final of the latter tournament, after which he retired from international football. In total, he made 89 international appearances and, with 33 goals, he is the Croatia national team's third-most prolific scorer of all time. He was named Croatian Footballer of the Year in 2012 and 2013.

== Club career ==
=== Youth and early career ===
Mandžukić started playing football in Germany, where he and his parents relocated to due to the Croatian War of Independence. In 1992, he joined German club TSF Ditzingen, near Stuttgart. Upon returning to his home country, the newly independent Croatia, he spent the period between 1996 and 2003 at NK Marsonia before spending a season at the city minnows NK Željezničar. The next season, he returned to Marsonia and in the summer of 2005 he made a move to NK Zagreb.

=== Dinamo Zagreb ===
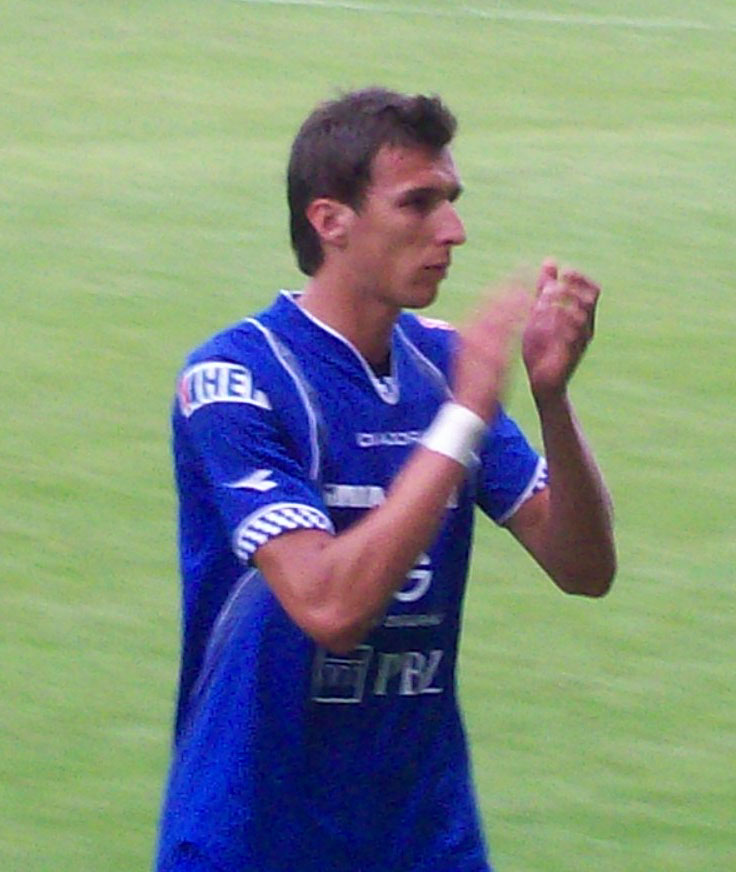
Mandžukić playing for Dinamo Zagreb in July 2008

In the summer of 2007, Mandžukić was bought by the Croatian powerhouse Dinamo Zagreb for €1.3 million as a replacement for their Arsenal-bound star striker Eduardo da Silva. Upon his arrival, he managed to secure his spot in starting eleven, playing mostly in the position of second striker. On 4 October 2007, he put on an impressive performance against AFC Ajax in Amsterdam when he scored two goals in extra-time to secure Dinamo's 2–3 away win, as Dinamo qualified for the group stage of 2007–08 UEFA Cup. He finished his first season at Dinamo with 12 goals and 11 assists throughout 29 matches, but also had a poor discipline record, collecting eight yellow cards.

He started the 2008–09 season with two goals against Linfield in a qualifier for the UEFA Cup. In the 2008–09 Prva HNL, Mandžukić was the league's top goalscorer, bagging 16 goals in 28 appearances. He also scored three goals in the season's UEFA Cup. This was the season of his rise in the Croatia national team as well, as he collected eight caps in 2010 FIFA World Cup qualifying matches. After the 2008–09 season had finished, he was linked with German side Werder Bremen, but the €12 million offer was rejected by the Dinamo board, who were of opinion that Mandžukić's worth was at least €15 million. He started the 2009–10 season by scoring a goal in a Champions League play-off match against Red Bull Salzburg. Mandžukić received red card in the last minutes of the game. After he told the referee that he got hit by the bottle that somebody threw from the stands, he gave him his second yellow card and ruled him out of the game. On 17 September 2009, after Dinamo lost 2–0 at home to Anderlecht in Europa League, Mandžukić was controversially fined €100,000 after being accused of poor effort. It was the first time in the history of the club that a player was financially fined. On 20 September, Mandžukić captained Dinamo to a 6–0 victory against HNK Rijeka in Prva HNL. In a post–match interview, Mandžukić rejected any speculation about him leaving the club after the fine, stating that it was his childhood dream to captain the Dinamo side and that he gives his best in any match he plays for the club. During that season, he appeared in 24 league matches, scoring 14 goals. He appeared in five Europa League matches as well.

=== Wolfsburg ===
On 14 July 2010, Mandžukić signed for VfL Wolfsburg for a fee believed to be around €7 million. Upon his arrival, in the first half of the 2010–11 season, he played regularly but mostly coming on as a substitute. At the time, he was mostly used as left winger under coach Steve McClaren, who played with only one striker, Edin Džeko. Things changed for Mandžukić, however, after the departure of Džeko to Manchester City in January 2011. Mandžukić scored his first Bundesliga goal for Wolfsburg on Matchday 26 against 1. FC Nürnberg under interim manager Pierre Littbarski. Upon the arrival of manager Felix Magath, Mandžukić was played in his natural position as striker. In the last seven matches of the domestic season, he scored eight goals, two of which came in the last match against TSG 1899 Hoffenheim, and were crucial for the club as they avoided relegation. In his second season in Wolfsburg, he became a regular starter in the Bundesliga and was the club's top goalscorer with 12 goals. In his two years at Wolfsburg, he scored 20 times in 56 appearances, establishing himself as one of Wolfsburg's best players during his stay and quickly becoming a fan favourite due to his goalscoring ability and attitude.

=== Bayern Munich ===
==== 2012–13 season ====
On 26 June 2012, Mandžukić signed a contract with Bundesliga club Bayern Munich for a transfer fee of €13 million, pending a medical test, subsequent to his strong performance at UEFA Euro 2012 in Ukraine and Poland, and because of his terrific form for Wolfsburg in the Bundesliga. On 27 June, the transfer was officially announced by Bayern Munich.

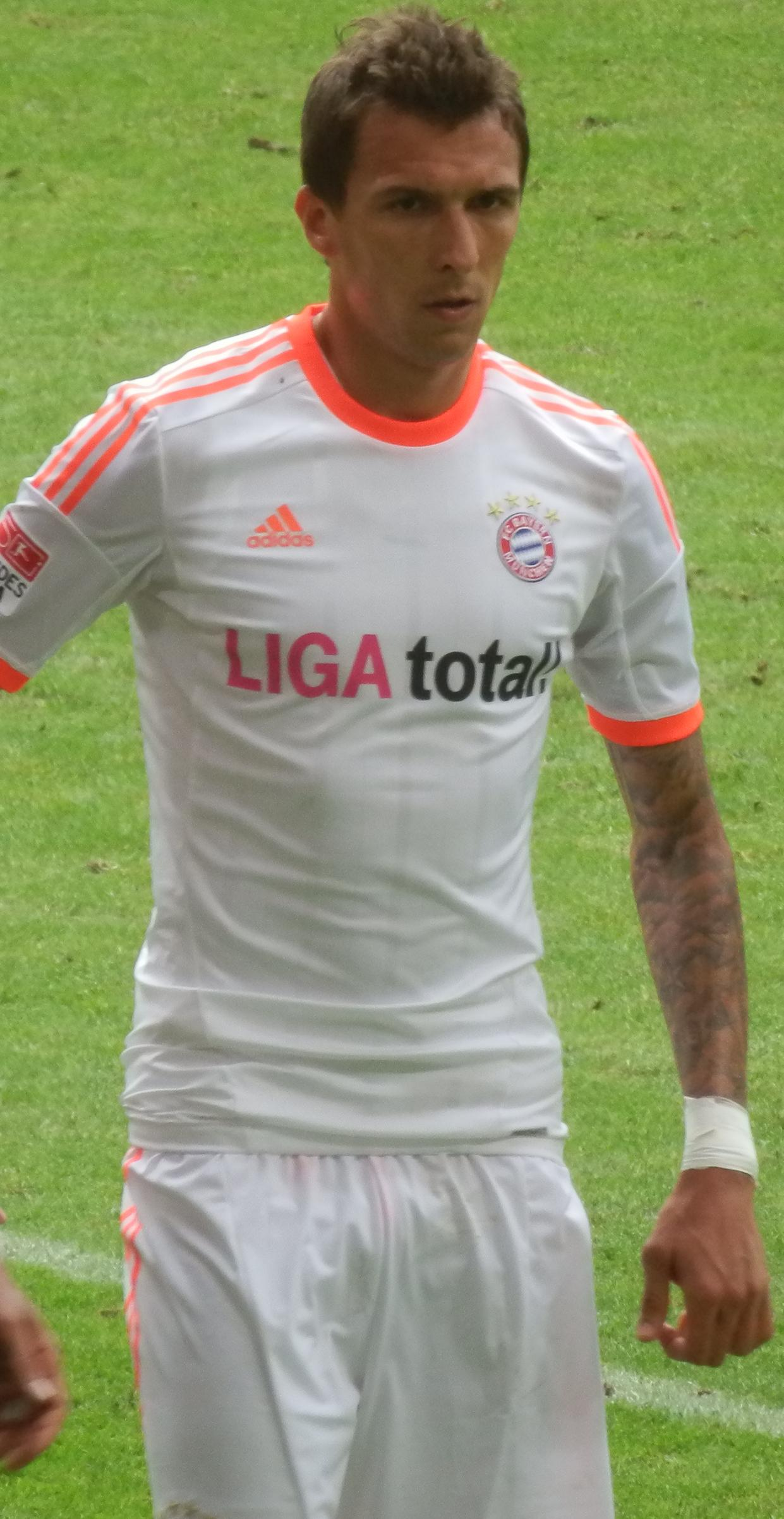
Mandžukić playing for Bayern Munich in August 2012

On 24 July 2012, Mandžukić made his debut for Bayern in a 6–0 win against Chinese Super League side Beijing Guoan, scoring the fifth goal in the friendly match in the 79th minute. On 12 August, he scored his first goal in an official game against reigning Bundesliga champions Borussia Dortmund in the sixth minute, helping his team win the German DFL Supercup. He scored his first league goal for Bayern against Greuther Fürth on matchday one and added another one the next matchday in a 6–1 win against VfB Stuttgart. He went on to score twice against his former club Wolfsburg.

Mandžukić then added four more goals in five more Bundesliga matches, taking his tally to nine goals in 11 matches in the German top tier. After the Bundesliga winter break, Mandžukić continued with his goal scoring activity, netting three more goals in first two games, against Greuther Fürth and Stuttgart. He scored another brace against 1. FSV Mainz 05. He finished his first Bundesliga season with Bayern as the club's top goalscorer, netting a total of 15 goals in 24 matches and having a major impact in winning the Bundesliga title. He scored his first Champions League goal of the season in the Round of 16 match against Arsenal. He netted another one in the quarter-final match against Juventus in Turin, giving Bayern the 0–1 away lead. On 25 May, Bayern faced Borussia Dortmund in the 2013 UEFA Champions League Final and Mandžukić scored the first goal of the match, giving Bayern a 1–0 lead in 60th minute. Bayern went on to win the match 2–1 after a late goal from Arjen Robben. With this goal, Mandžukić became the first Croat to score in a Champions League final game and it capped a highly successful first season for him in Munich, as the club completed a treble-winning season, claiming the Bundesliga, Champions League, and DFB-Pokal, as well as the German Supercup at the start of the campaign.

==== 2013–14 season ====
Mandžukić first began the season slowly, having small issues adjusting to new Bayern coach Pep Guardiola's system. Guardiola changed Bayern's formation from the 4–2–3–1 they had used previously under Jupp Heynckes to a new 4–1–4–1 style. While it took a bit of time to adjust, Mandžukić regained his form nonetheless in time for league play. He opened the new season in the Bundesliga by scoring two goals in two league appearances. Mandžukić scored his first Champions League goal of the season when Bayern Munich began the defence of their Champions League title against CSKA Moscow with a 3–0 victory at the Allianz Arena. He headed the only goal as Bayern defeated a valiant FC Viktoria Plzeň in November to move into the knockout stages with a record-equalling ninth successive UEFA Champions League win. Mandžukić scored his tenth goal of the new Bundesliga season in a December match against Hamburger SV.

In the first semi-final of 2013 FIFA Club World Cup, Mandžukić dove low to head Thiago Alcantara's cross into goal for 2–0 against Guangzhou Evergrande. He eventually won the competition with Bayern after the final with Raja Casablanca, ended with a 2–0 victory. Upon the Bundesliga winter break, Mandžukić was left out of the Bayern Munich 18-man roster in their match against Borussia Mönchengladbach, with Guardiola reportedly unimpressed with his performances in training. He returned to the squad for the next match against VfB Stuttgart. A week later, against Eintracht Frankfurt, Mandžukić delivered a response with a commanding performance in Bayern's 5–0 win, scoring the last goal of the match and delivering a pinpoint pass to Mario Götze who opened the scoring. On 12 February, Mandžukić scored his first hat-trick of the season, as Bayern Munich eased their way into the DFB-Pokal semi-final with a 5–0 rout of Hamburger SV. In the match against Hannover 96, Mandžukić celebrated his 100th Bundesliga appearance by meeting Rafinha's cross to complete the goal. Despite being the club's top scorer with 26 goals, Mandžukić was dropped from the team by Guardiola ahead of the 2014 DFB-Pokal Final. Mandžukić stated that he wanted to leave Bayern because "the playing style of coach Pep Guardiola simply does not fit" him.

=== Atlético Madrid ===
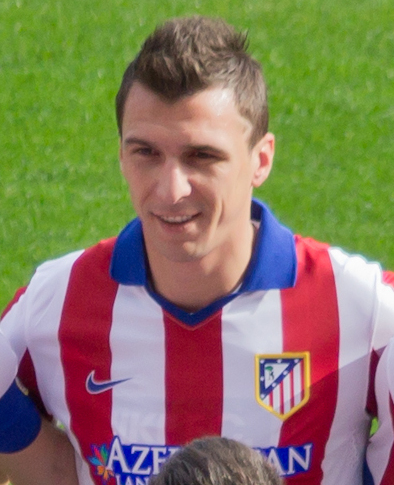
Mandžukić with Atlético Madrid in October 2014

On 10 July 2014, Mandžukić signed a four-year deal with the Spanish club Atlético Madrid for an undisclosed fee. On 24 July, Mandžukić was presented to Atlético Madrid fans at Vicente Calderón, wearing the number 9 shirt. He made his competitive debut in the first leg of the 2014 Supercopa de España on 19 August, a 1–1 draw away to Real Madrid, in which he played 78 minutes before being replaced by fellow debutant Raúl Jiménez. In the second leg at Vicente Calderón, Mandžukić scored his first competitive goal for the club, netting the winner after just two minutes. It was the quickest goal in the competition.

Mandžukić scored his first league goal against SD Eibar, on 30 August, as Atlético recorded their first win of the new Primera División season. In the opening match of the new Champions League campaign, against Olympiacos, Mandžukić collected Cristian Ansaldi's cross and sent home a close-range header into the bottom corner to make it 1–2, in eventual 2–3 loss. Mandžukić helped Atlético move within two points of joint-league leaders Barcelona and Sevilla on 26 October when he tapped in Arda Turan's cross to score the solitary goal in a win over Getafe.

After returning to action sporting a facemask, he went from strength to strength, bagging 14 goals in all competitions before the winter break – including a sensational hat trick against Olympiacos in the return group stage game at the Calderon on 26 November, which ensured a place in the Champions League knockout stage. Mandžukić scored his 11th La Liga goal of the season in his 19th appearance, in Los Colchoneros emphatic 4–0 victory over local rivals Real Madrid in the second league derby of the season, when sport analysts noted that Mandžukić put in one of the great centre-forward displays seen in La Liga in recent years, contributing to everything that was good about his side before putting the icing on the cake with a well-taken fourth. In total, Mandžukić bagged 20 goals in 43 appearances in his only season in Madrid, living up to his image of hard-working and proven goal scorer.

=== Juventus ===
On 22 June 2015, Serie A champions Juventus announced that Mandžukić joined the club from Atlético Madrid on a four-year contract for a fee of €19 million payable in three installments, including a possible extra €2 million in performance-related add-ons.

==== 2015–16 season ====
On 8 August he scored the opening goal in the 69th minute for Juventus with a header against Lazio in the 2015 Supercoppa Italiana, a 2–0 win in Shanghai. On 23 August 2015, he made an official league debut for Juventus, starting and playing the full 90 minutes in a 1–0 loss to Udinese, in the first league game of the 2015–16 Serie A season.

On 21 September 2015, it was confirmed that Mandžukić would be out for three weeks following a thigh related injury the day before in a 2–0 win over Genoa. However, he returned early, scoring Juventus's first goal, and temporary equaliser, as the team came from behind to win 2–1 away against Manchester City, during their opening match of the Champions League group stage, on 15 September 2015. On 25 October 2015, Mandžukić scored the final goal in Juventus's 2–0 home win over Atalanta in the 49th minute; this was his first Serie A goal in his 6th league appearance with the club. He scored again two games later, helping Juventus to defeat Empoli 3–1. On 25 November 2015, Mandžukić scored the winning goal in a 1–0 home win over Manchester City in the second leg of the Champions League group stage, to secure the club a spot in the round of 16. Due to these significant goals, as well as another one in a 3–0 away win against Palermo on 29 November, he was voted Juventus player of the month for November 2015. On 27 January 2016, Mandžukić sustained a muscle injury during the first semi-final leg of the Coppa Italia against Inter Milan, putting him on the sidelines for four weeks. It was initially feared that he would miss the first round of 16 leg of the Champions League against his former club, Bayern Munich. However, he returned to action earlier than expected, starting in the match against Bayern on 23 February, and setting up Paulo Dybala's goal in a 2–2 home draw.

==== 2016–17 season ====
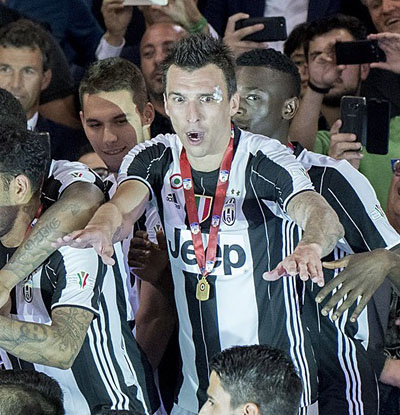
Mandžukić with Juventus at the end of victorious 2017 Coppa Italia Final

Mandžukić's second season with Juventus was particularly notable, as he was often played out of position by the club's manager Massimiliano Allegri; throughout the 2016–17 season, he primarily served as a left winger, rather than as an out and out striker, a position which he normally occupied in the past. Although his goalscoring rate decreased, he drew praise in the media for his work-rate, versatility, consistency, and for the overall high quality of his performances in this new role. On 25 May 2017, Mandžukić signed a contract extension that would keep him at the club until 2020. On 3 June, Mandžukić started in the Champions League Final. He scored the equalising goal in the 27th minute, just seven minutes after Cristiano Ronaldo's goal gave Real Madrid the lead. Mandžukić chested down a ball from Gonzalo Higuaín and hooked the ball over his shoulder from 15 yards (14 m), which arced over Keylor Navas in net. The goal was heralded as one of the best goals ever scored in a Champions League final, and was compared to Zinedine Zidane's goal in the 2002 final for Real Madrid; but Juventus were ultimately defeated 4–1. Mandžukić's bicycle kick goal against Real Madrid went on to win the 2016–17 UEFA Goal of the Season award.

==== 2017–18 season ====
On 31 October 2017, Mandžukić made his 100th appearance for Juventus in a 1–1 away draw against Sporting in the UEFA Champions League. On 11 April 2018, he scored two goals in 3–1 away win against Real Madrid in the quarter-finals of Champions League. The first goal scored after 76 seconds became the fastest goal Real Madrid conceded in Champions League home game and was the first opposition player to score a first-half double in a Champions League match at the Bernabeu.

==== 2018–19 season ====
On 25 August 2018, Mandžukić scored his first goal of the 2018–19 season in a 2–0 home win over Lazio. On 6 October, he made his 100th appearance in Serie A with the club in a 2–0 away win over Udinese, setting up the second goal of the match scored by Cristiano Ronaldo. On 24 November, Mandžukić captained the first team in a 2–0 home win over SPAL, scoring his sixth goal of the season. Three days later, on 27 November, he scored his first goal of the Champions League season in a 1–0 home win against Valencia, assisted by Cristiano Ronaldo. Italian newspapers La Gazzetta dello Sport and La Stampa noted the emerging symbiosis between Mandžukić and Ronaldo, described as an unexpected tandem of power and skill. On 4 April 2019, Mandžukić extended his contract with Juventus until 2021.

=== Al-Duhail ===
With the arrival of new Juventus manager Maurizio Sarri in the summer of 2019, Mandžukić was sidelined after being excluded from the manager's plans. As a result, he was also omitted from Juventus's Champions League squad, alongside teammate Emre Can. After failing to make a single appearance for the club during the 2019–20 season, he agreed to join Qatari side Al-Duhail on 24 December. On 29 December, the transfer was made official.

He made his league debut on 4 January 2020 in a goalless draw with Qatar SC. He scored his first goal for the club on 10 January in a 2–0 win over Al-Sailiya in Qatar Cup. On 11 February 2020, he made his debut and scored his debut goal in the AFC Champions League, scoring the opener in a group stage home victory. On 5 July 2020, after ten appearances and two goals overall, Mandžukić terminated his contract with the Qatari side by mutual consent.

=== AC Milan ===
Following the contract termination, several clubs showed interest for signing Mandžukić, including Fenerbahçe, Beşiktaş, Lokomotiv Moscow, AC Milan, Benevento, Hellas Verona, Fiorentina, Aston Villa, Wolverhampton Wanderers, Marseille, Wolfsburg, Hertha Berlin and Schalke 04.

On 19 January 2021, Mandžukić joined Serie A club Milan on a contract until the end of the season, with the option of a further year. He made his league debut on 23 January in a 3–0 defeat to Atalanta. Due to recurring injuries that impaired his physical conditions and a poor form, Mandžukić made just 11 appearances for Milan, mostly as a substitute, with no goals scored. On 24 May 2021, Mandžukić announced his departure from Milan as the club management had not extended his contract.

On 3 September 2021, Mandžukić announced his retirement.

== International career ==
After putting together a string of solid performances in the 2007–08 Prva HNL, as well as in Dinamo's UEFA Champions League and UEFA Cup matches, Mandžukić earned a call–up to the Croat national team, for which he debuted in a game against Macedonia on 17 November 2007. On 10 September 2008, he scored his first ever goal for Croatia in a 4–1 home loss against England in a 2010 FIFA World Cup qualifying match.

=== Euro 2012 ===
Mandžukić's influence in the national team increased during the UEFA Euro 2012 qualifying. His first goal of the campaign came in June 2011, when he scored an equalizer against Georgia at the Stadion Poljud. He added another header against Latvia in the last match of the qualifiers. With Croatia finishing second in their group, they had to face Turkey in the Euro 2012 play-offs. In the first match played in Istanbul, Croatia stunned the home fans by winning 0–3, with Mandžukić scoring the second goal from a header in the 32nd minute of the match.

Mandžukić was one of two of manager Slaven Bilić's first choice strikers for Croatia at UEFA Euro 2012, being paired with the Everton striker Nikica Jelavić. He scored twice in Croatia's opening 3–1 win against the Republic of Ireland, and also scored in a 1–1 draw against Italy the following match. Despite Croatia's group-stage exit, he was the joint-top scorer of the tournament with three goals alongside Mario Balotelli, Fernando Torres, Cristiano Ronaldo, Alan Dzagoev, and future Bayern teammate Mario Gómez.

=== 2014 FIFA World Cup ===
He opened the 2014 FIFA World Cup qualification by providing two assists in the first two matches, against Macedonia in Zagreb and against Belgium in Brussels. He scored his first goal of the campaign against Wales in Osijek. Mandžukić added another goal to his tally in qualification match against Serbia, giving Croatia a 1–0 lead, in Zagreb. He also scored in the second match between the two sides in Belgrade. In the second leg of Croatia's play-off match against Iceland in Zagreb, Mandžukić gave Croatia the lead in an eventual 2–0 win. However, he later received a red card after a reckless high tackle on Jóhann Berg Guðmundsson connected with the Icelandic midfielder's left knee.

Mandžukić was named in Croatia's squad for the 2014 FIFA World Cup in Brazil, but was suspended for the team's first match against the host nation in São Paulo on 12 June 2014. He returned to the team for their second match against Cameroon on 18 June, and marked his debut at the World Cup scoring twice in a 4–0 win, being awarded the "Man of the Match" award.

=== Euro 2016 ===
Mandžukić scored once in Croatia's successful UEFA Euro 2016 qualifying campaign, opening a 1–1 home draw with Italy in Split on 12 June 2015. The following 4 June, both he and Nikola Kalinić scored hat-tricks in a 10–0 warm-up win against San Marino in Rijeka ahead of the tournament; the result was a record victory for Croatia.

=== 2018 FIFA World Cup ===
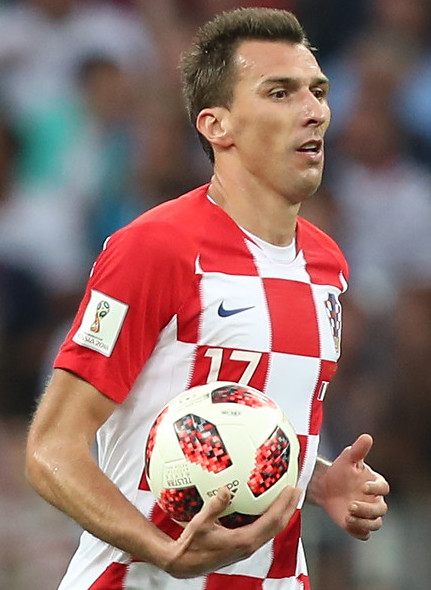
Mandžukić after scoring in the 2018 FIFA World Cup Final against France

On 6 October 2016, Mandžukić scored a hat-trick in a 6–0 win over Kosovo in Shkodër for 2018 FIFA World Cup qualification, the opponents' first competitive game as the home team.

On 4 June 2018, Mandžukić was named to Croatia's final 23-man squad for the 2018 FIFA World Cup. In the opening game against Nigeria, he caused Oghenekaro Etebo's own goal and won a penalty, that was successfully converted by Luka Modrić, as the game ended as a 2–0 win for Croatia. During the side's round-of-16 match against Denmark on 1 July, he scored the equalising goal in the 4th minute of play; following a 1–1 draw after extra-time, Croatia prevailed 3–2 in the resulting penalty shoot-out. In the quarter-finals against hosts Russia on 7 July, Mandžukić provided an assist in the first half of regulation time for Andrej Kramarić's equaliser. A 1–1 draw after 90 minutes saw the match go into extra-time, and following a 2–2 draw after 120 minutes of play, Croatia once again progressed to the next round in the ensuing shoot-out, winning 4–3 on penalties.

During Croatia's semi-final match against England on 11 July, with the score tied at 1–1 after regulation time, Mandžukić scored the match-winning goal in 109th minute to give Croatia a 2–1 victory, sending the team to the World Cup final for the first time in their history. In the final against France on 15 July, he became the first player ever to score an own goal in a World Cup final, when he headed Antoine Griezmann's free-kick into his own net to give France a 1–0 lead; he later scored Croatia's second goal by chasing down and capitalizing on an error from French goalkeeper Hugo Lloris, as France eventually won the match by a score of 4–2. With that goal, Mario Mandžukić became the second player in World Cup history to score for both teams in a single match (the first being Ernie Brandts of the Netherlands in a 1978 World Cup match against Italy) and the first to do so in a final.

=== Retirement ===
On 14 August 2018, Mandžukić announced his retirement from international football. At the time of his retirement, he was the second highest goalscorer in the history of the Croatia national team with 33 goals.

In his statement, Mandžukić wrote about the 2018 World Cup silver medal:

We have made our dreams come true, achieved a historic success, and experienced unbelievable support. That month, including the welcome in Zagreb, Slavonski Brod, and the entire Croatia, will remain the most important memory of my career. This has been the most beautiful national team journey, and my favourite return to homeland. I am more than happy, fulfilled, and extremely proud of this silver, that has been forged through years, through pain, effort, work, disappointment, and difficult moments. There is no ideal moment to retire. If possible, we would all play for Croatia until we die, since there is no prouder feeling, but I feel this moment has come for me – now. I've given my best for Croatia, I have contributed to the biggest success of Croatian football.

== Style of play ==
In addition to his goalscoring, pundits noted Mandžukić for his physical strength, versatility, mobility and fitness, as well as his ability in the air. He was even given the nickname Đilkoš [dʑîːlkoʃ] by Miroslav Blažević, which means brash and unsophisticated, referring to the striker's physical strengths, powerful physique and seemingly endless stamina, rather than his technical ability; his other nicknames included Mandžo and Super Mario. Known for his high work-rate and defensive contribution, Mandžukić's former manager at Wolfsburg, Felix Magath, noted his endurance, stating that the striker was "so fit that I think he could play two back-to-back games without stopping even for a minute."

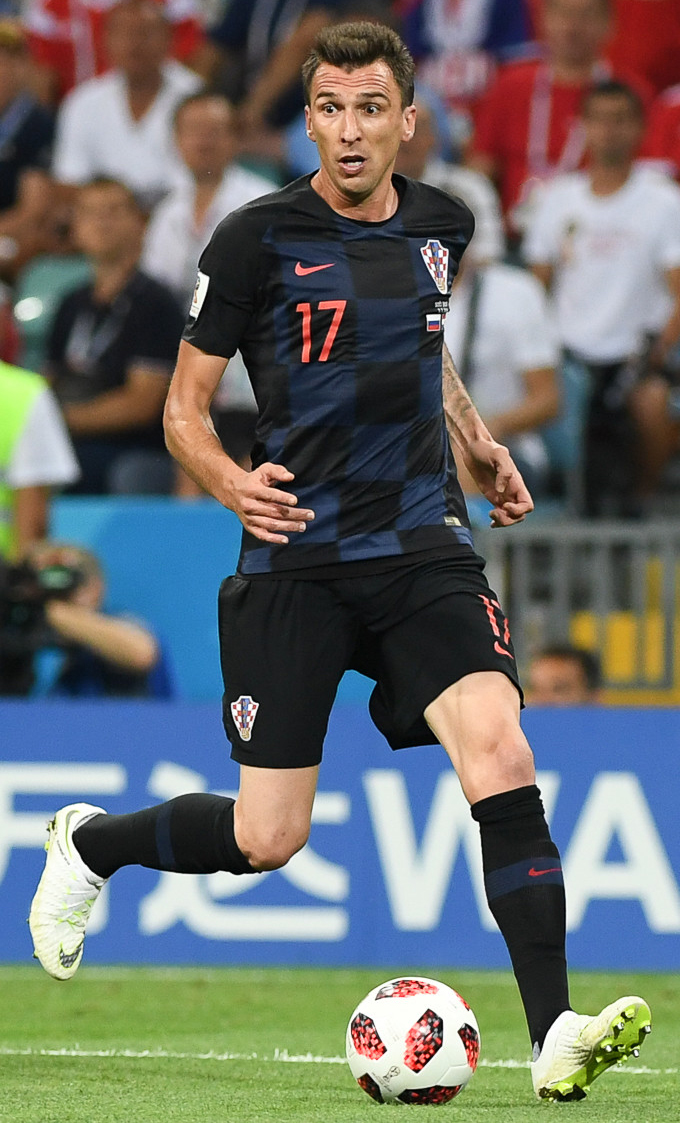
Mandžukić playing for Croatia at the 2018 FIFA World Cup

Following his move to Atlético Madrid, Sky Sports analyst Adam Bate wrote that he was the perfect fit for manager Diego Simeone's style as Mandžukić was "often the instigator of the press with his energetic running, Mandzukic battles defences, driving them back to create space for teammates as well as preventing opponents building patiently without pressure on the ball." Bate further added that the Croatian was "...both a physical and mobile striker who does much of his best work without the ball, seemingly doing the work of two players and thus allowing an extra man in midfield." ESPN FC contributor Michael Cox also praised Mandžukić for his excellent team-work, highlighting that while he pressed his opponents energetically when they attempted to play the ball out from the back, he was also extremely diligent and disciplined in the manner in which he dropped back into his own half to defend behind the ball if his opponents managed to bypass his team's pressing. In 2014, Aleksandar Holiga commented on Mandžukić's playing, stating that "[h]e stretches the defences with constant movement and seemingly endless stamina, opening space for others to come from behind or cut inside from the wing; his pressing on the ball has proven decisive on a number of previous occasions and he is, of course, one of the best strikers in the world when it comes to aerial power. So even if he does not score himself, his presence could be key for the team's chances."

While he primarily served as a striker or as target-man in the penalty area, courtesy of his height, aerial prowess, and physical strength, (Note: See) Mandžukić's work-rate, generosity, tactical intelligence, and versatility were demonstrated by his willingness to play in many different positions across or behind the front line; throughout his career, he was also deployed as a winger, as a second striker, as an attacking midfielder, or even as a wing-back, positions which allowed him the freedom to attack from deeper or wider areas with his runs, support and link-up with his more offensive teammates, draw opponents out of position with his movement, and cover defensively for full-backs making overlapping attacking runs. Indeed, in particular during his time at Juventus under manager Massimiliano Allegri, competition from other forwards often saw Mandžukić being used in these deeper or wider, more creative roles, in particular on the left flank, in which he excelled, drawing praise from the media for his consistently high-quality performances, because of his ability to hold up the ball with his back to goal and play off of his teammates, or drop into midfield to help win back the ball when his team were not in possession. He was also required to function as a "wide target man" on the left side of the pitch occasion, due to his movement and work-rate, as well as his ability to utilise his height to win aerial challenges, or use his strength and solid technique to hold up the ball for teammates and create space or chances for them; in this position, he essentially played a hybrid of the roles of a target man, left winger, and left-back. (Note: See) In addition to his ability as a footballer, Mandžukić was also known for his determination, leadership, and mental strength, and had been described as a "big-game player" in the media, due to his tendency to score decisive goals in important matches for both club and country. As such, during his time in Italy, he earned the nickname "guerriero" ("warrior," in Italian) from the Juventus fans. His playing style has been compared to that of compatriot Alen Bokšić, who also played as a forward for Juventus.

== Personal life ==
Mandžukić was born in Slavonski Brod, present-day Croatia, on 21 May 1986. His father Mato is a Bosnian Croat from Prud near Šamac. Mato was also a football player, who moved to Slavonski Brod upon transferring from Kozara Bosanska Gradiška to BSK.

Mandžukić has been in a relationship with Ivana Mikulić from Strizivojna since 2007.

On 16 April 2021, AC Milan club Chairman Paolo Scaroni announced that Mandžukić donated his March salary to AC Milan's club charity, Fondazione Milan, as he was injured the entire month. Fondazione Milan is a charity set up by the club in order to develop facilities and help younger players with difficulty getting the chance to play football. Mandžukić later donated his April and May wages as a result of a long injury.

== Career statistics ==
=== Club ===
Appearances and goals by club, season and competition
Club	Season	League			National cup (Note: Includes Croatian Cup, DFB-Pokal, Coppa Italia, Qatar Crown Prince Cup)		Continental		Other		Total	
Club	Season	Division	Apps	Goals	Apps	Goals	Apps	Goals	Apps	Goals	Apps	Goals
Marsonia	2004–05	Druga HNL	23	14	—		—		—		23	14
NK Zagreb	2005–06	Prva HNL	28	3	—		—		—		28	3
NK Zagreb	2006–07	Prva HNL	23	11	4	3	—		—		27	14
NK Zagreb	2007–08	Prva HNL	—		—		2 (Note: Appearances in UEFA Intertoto Cup)	0	—		2	0
NK Zagreb	Total		51	14	4	3	2	0	—		57	17
Dinamo Zagreb	2007–08	Prva HNL	29	12	8	5	10 (Note: Five appearances and one goal in UEFA Champions League, five appearances and two goals in UEFA Cup)	3	—		47	20
Dinamo Zagreb	2008–09	Prva HNL	28	16	5	5	10 (Note: Five appearances and two goals in UEFA Champions League, five appearances and one goal in UEFA Cup)	3	—		43	24
Dinamo Zagreb	2009–10	Prva HNL	24	14	3	0	10 (Note: Three appearances and two goals in UEFA Champions League, seven appearances and one goal in UEFA Europa League)	3	—		37	17
Dinamo Zagreb	2010–11	Prva HNL	—		—		1 (Note: Appearance(s) in UEFA Champions League)	2	—		1	2
Dinamo Zagreb	Total		81	42	16	10	31	11	—		128	63
VfL Wolfsburg	2010–11	Bundesliga	24	8	3	0	—		—		27	8
VfL Wolfsburg	2011–12	Bundesliga	32	12	1	0	—		—		33	12
VfL Wolfsburg	Total		56	20	4	0	—		—		60	20
Bayern Munich	2012–13	Bundesliga	24	15	5	3	10	3	1 (Note: Appearance in DFL-Supercup)	1	40	22
Bayern Munich	2013–14	Bundesliga	30	18	4	4	10	3	4 (Note: One appearance in DFL-Supercup, one in UEFA Super Cup, two appearances and one goal in FIFA Club World Cup)	1	48	26
Bayern Munich	Total		54	33	9	7	20	6	5	2	88	48
Atlético Madrid	2014–15	La Liga	28	12	3	2	10	5	2 (Note: Appearances in Supercopa de España)	1	43	20
Juventus	2015–16	Serie A	27	10	3	0	5	2	1 (Note: Appearance in Supercoppa Italiana)	1	36	13
Juventus	2016–17	Serie A	34	7	4	1	11	3	1	0	50	11
Juventus	2017–18	Serie A	32	5	4	1	|4	1	0	43	10	
Juventus	2018–19	Serie A	25	9	0	0	8	1	0	0	33	10
Juventus	Total		118	31	11	2	30	10	3	1	162	44
Al-Duhail	2019–20	Qatar Stars League	5	0	1	0	2 (Note: Appearances in AFC Champions League)	1	2 (Note: Appearances in Qatar Cup)	1	10	2
AC Milan	2020–21	Serie A	10	0	0	0	1 (Note: Appearance in UEFA Europa League)	0	—		11	0
Career total			426	166	48	24	96	33	12	5	582	228

=== International ===
Appearances and goals by national team and year
National team	Year	Apps	Goals
Croatia	2007	1	0
Croatia	2008	3	1
Croatia	2009	6	0
Croatia	2010	8	1
Croatia	2011	8	3
Croatia	2012	11	4
Croatia	2013	10	4
Croatia	2014	10	4
Croatia	2015	6	3
Croatia	2016	11	9
Croatia	2017	7	1
Croatia	2018	8	3
Total		89	33

Scores and results list Croatia's goal tally first

List of international goals scored by Mario Mandžukić
No.	Date	Venue	Cap	Opponent	Score	Result	Competition
1	10 September 2008	Stadion Maksimir, Zagreb, Croatia	2	England	1–3	1–4	2010 FIFA World Cup qualification
2	12 October 2010	Stadion Maksimir, Zagreb, Croatia	17	Norway	1–1	2–1	Friendly
3	3 June 2011	Stadion Poljud, Split, Croatia	19	Georgia	1–1	2–1	UEFA Euro 2012 qualification
4	11 October 2011	Stadion Kantrida, Rijeka, Croatia	24	Latvia	2–0	2–0	UEFA Euro 2012 qualification
5	11 November 2011	Türk Telekom Arena, Istanbul, Turkey	25	Turkey	2–0	3–0	UEFA Euro 2012 qualification
6	10 June 2012	Municipal Stadium, Poznań, Poland	30	Republic of Ireland	1–0	3–1	UEFA Euro 2012
7	10 June 2012	Municipal Stadium, Poznań, Poland	30	Republic of Ireland	3–1	3–1	UEFA Euro 2012
8	14 June 2012	Municipal Stadium, Poznań, Poland	31	Italy	1–1	1–1	UEFA Euro 2012
9	16 October 2012	Stadion Gradski vrt, Osijek, Croatia	37	Wales	1–0	2–0	2014 FIFA World Cup qualification
10	6 February 2013	Craven Cottage, London, England	38	South Korea	1–0	4–0	Friendly
11	22 March 2013	Stadion Maksimir, Zagreb, Croatia	39	Serbia	1–0	2–0	2014 FIFA World Cup qualification
12	6 September 2013	Red Star Stadium, Belgrade, Serbia	43	Serbia	1–0	1–1	2014 FIFA World Cup qualification
13	19 November 2013	Stadion Maksimir, Zagreb, Croatia	47	Iceland	1–0	2–0	2014 FIFA World Cup qualification
14	18 June 2014	Arena da Amazônia, Manaus, Brazil	51	Cameroon	3–0	4–0	2014 FIFA World Cup
15	18 June 2014	Arena da Amazônia, Manaus, Brazil	51	Cameroon	4–0	4–0	2014 FIFA World Cup
16	4 September 2014	Stadion Aldo Drosina, Pula, Croatia	53	Cyprus	1–0	2–0	Friendly
17	4 September 2014	Stadion Aldo Drosina, Pula, Croatia	53	Cyprus	2–0	2–0	Friendly
18	7 June 2015	Stadion Varteks, Varaždin, Croatia	59	Gibraltar	3–0	4–0	Friendly
19	12 June 2015	Stadion Poljud, Split, Croatia	60	Italy	1–0	1–1	UEFA Euro 2016 qualification
20	17 November 2015	Olimp-2, Rostov-on-Don, Russia	63	Russia	3–1	3–1	Friendly
21	26 March 2016	Groupama Arena, Budapest, Hungary	65	Hungary	1–0	1–1	Friendly
22	4 June 2016	Stadion Rujevica, Rijeka, Croatia	66	San Marino	2–0	10–0	Friendly
23	4 June 2016	Stadion Rujevica, Rijeka, Croatia	66	San Marino	4–0	10–0	Friendly
24	4 June 2016	Stadion Rujevica, Rijeka, Croatia	66	San Marino	5–0	10–0	Friendly
25	6 October 2016	Loro Boriçi Stadium, Shkodër, Albania	71	Kosovo	1–0	6–0	2018 FIFA World Cup qualification
26	6 October 2016	Loro Boriçi Stadium, Shkodër, Albania	71	Kosovo	2–0	6–0	2018 FIFA World Cup qualification
27	6 October 2016	Loro Boriçi Stadium, Shkodër, Albania	71	Kosovo	3–0	6–0	2018 FIFA World Cup qualification
28	9 October 2016	Tampere Stadium, Tampere, Finland	72	Finland	1–0	1–0	2018 FIFA World Cup qualification
29	15 November 2016	Windsor Park, Belfast, Northern Ireland	74	Northern Ireland	1–0	3–0	Friendly
30	6 October 2017	Stadion Rujevica, Rijeka, Croatia	79	Finland	1–0	1–1	2018 FIFA World Cup qualification
31	1 July 2018	Nizhny Novgorod Stadium, Nizhny Novgorod, Russia	86	Denmark	1–1	1–1	2018 FIFA World Cup
32	11 July 2018	Luzhniki Stadium, Moscow, Russia	88	England	2–1	2–1	2018 FIFA World Cup
33	15 July 2018	Luzhniki Stadium, Moscow, Russia	89	France	2–4	2–4	2018 FIFA World Cup

== Honours ==
=== Playing career ===
Dinamo Zagreb

- Prva HNL: 2007–08, 2008–09, 2009–10
- Croatian Football Cup: 2007–08, 2008–09

Bayern Munich

- Bundesliga: 2012–13, 2013–14
- DFB-Pokal: 2012–13, 2013–14
- DFL-Supercup: 2012
- UEFA Champions League: 2012–13
- UEFA Super Cup: 2013
- FIFA Club World Cup: 2013

Atlético Madrid

- Supercopa de España: 2014

Juventus

- Serie A: 2015–16, 2016–17, 2017–18, 2018–19
- Coppa Italia: 2015–16, 2016–17, 2017–18
- Supercoppa Italiana: 2015, 2018
- UEFA Champions League runner-up: 2016–17

Al-Duhail

- Qatar Stars League: 2019–20

Croatia

- FIFA World Cup runner-up: 2018

Individual

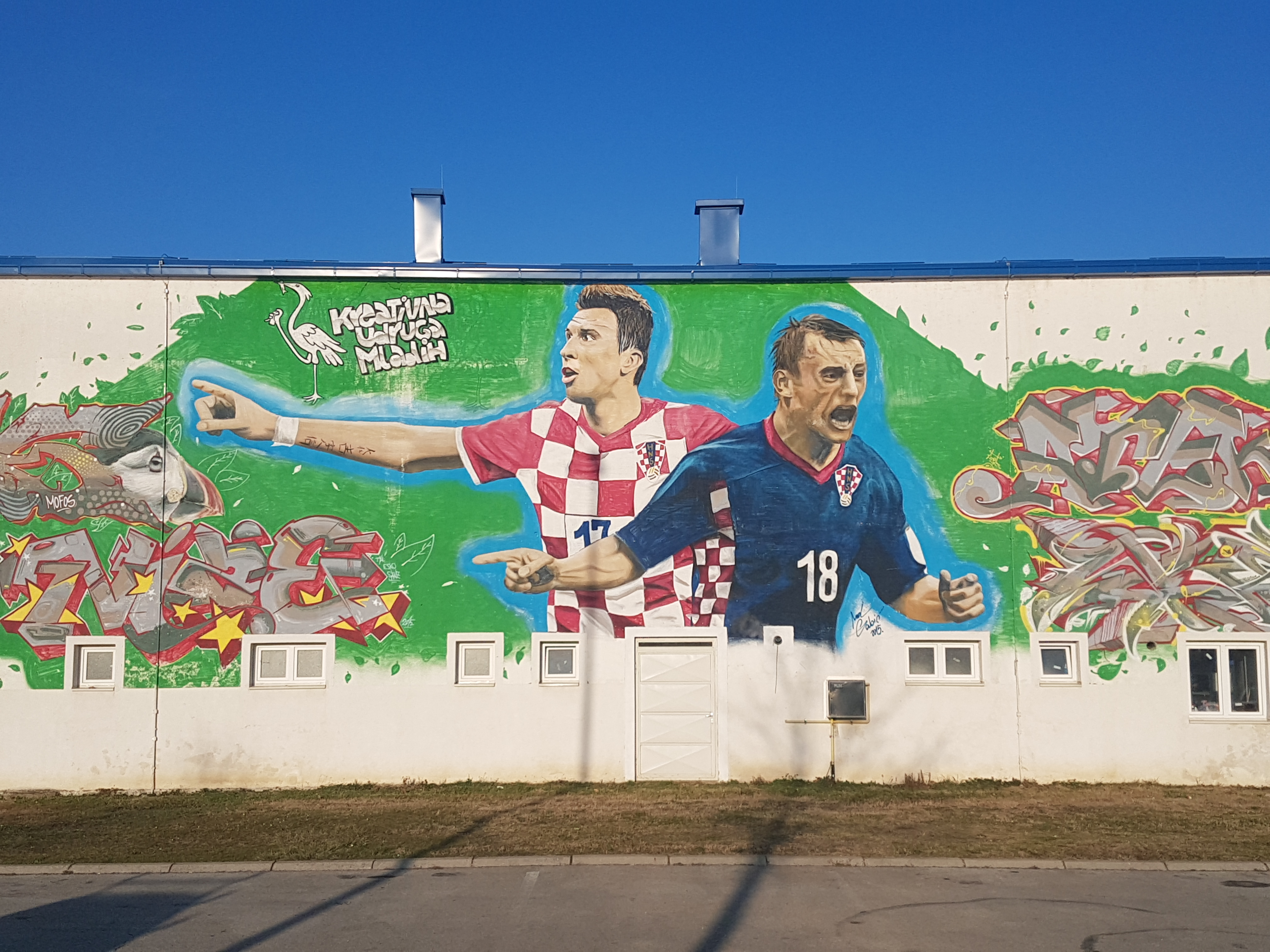
A mural honoring Slavonski Brod natives Mandžukić and Ivica Olić

- Prva HNL Player of the Year: 2009
- Sportske novosti Yellow Shirt award: 2008–09
- Croatian Footballer of the Year: 2012, 2013
- Vatrena krila: 2012
- Croatian Sportsman of the Year: 2013
- UEFA Goal of the Season: 2016–17
- VDV Bundesliga Team of the Season: 2012–13, 2013–14

Orders

- Order of Duke Branimir: 2018

=== Coaching career ===
Croatia (as assistant manager)

- FIFA World Cup third place: 2022

== See also ==
- List of FIFA World Cup top goalscorers
