= Merolino Sikirevačko =

- Village
- Location within Croatia
- Coordinates: 45°12′N 18°30′E
- Country: Croatia
- County: Osijek-Baranja County
- Municipality: Strizivojna

Area
  - Total: 3.2 km^{2} (1.2 sq mi)

Population (2021)
  - Total: 0
  - Density: 0.0/km^{2} (0.0/sq mi)
- Time zone: UTC+1 (CET)
  - Summer (DST): UTC+2 (CEST)

Merolino Sikirevačko is an uninhabited settlement in Croatia, located in Municipality of Strizivojna in Osijek-Baranja County. It is located near river Biđ, in a forest, around 7 km west of Strizivojna.
