= Lorenzo Laverone =

Italian footballer (born 1989)

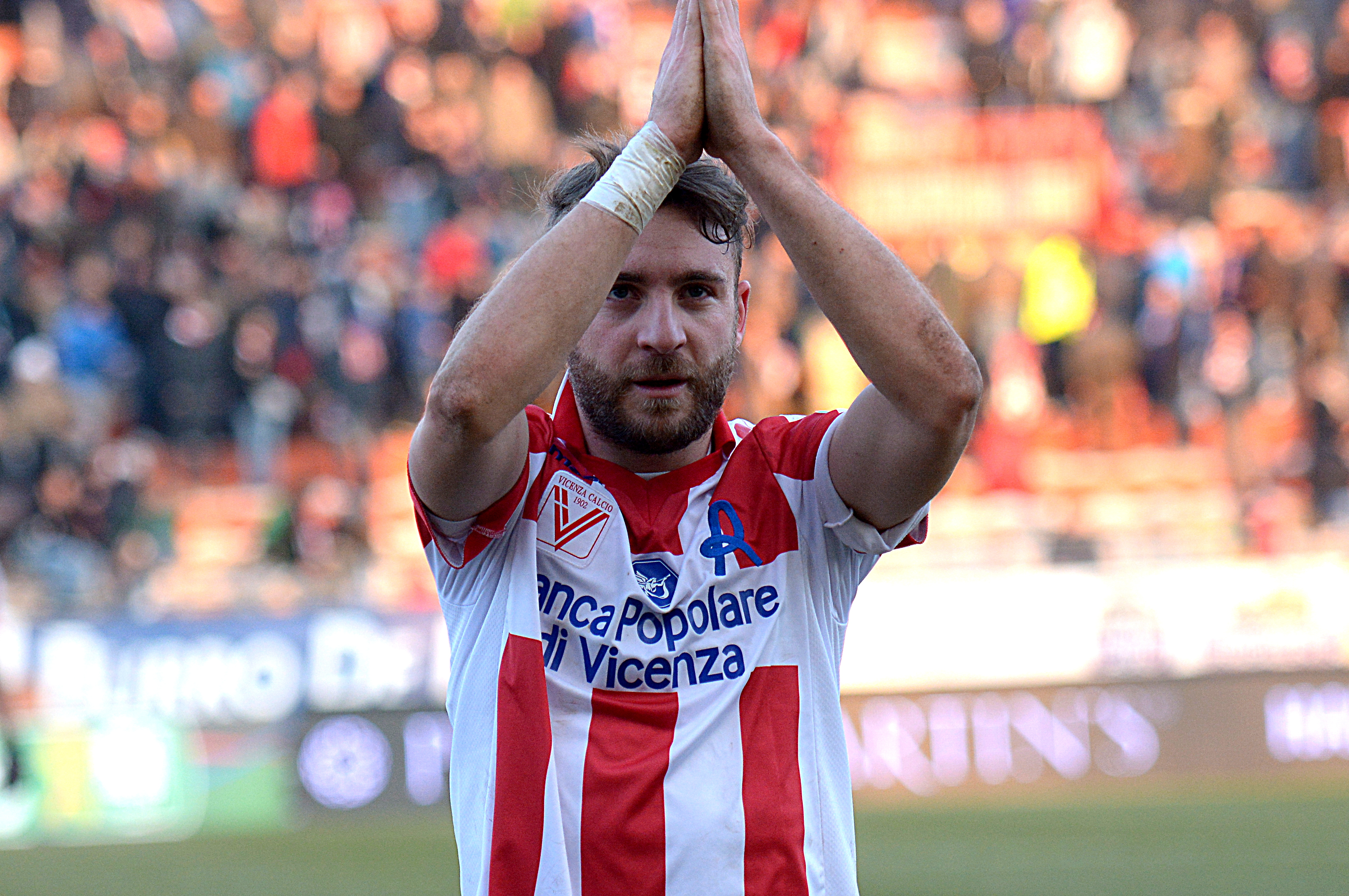

Personal information
- Date of birth: 19 April 1989 (age 37)
- Place of birth: Bagno a Ripoli, Italy
- Height: 1.75 m (5 ft 9 in)
- Position: Right back

Team information
- Current team: Prato

Youth career
- Prato

Senior career*
| Years | Team | Apps | (Gls) |
| 2007–2009 | Colligiana | 60 | (0) |
| 2009–2010 | Arezzo | 7 | (0) |
| 2010–2011 | Reggina | 22 | (0) |
| 2011–2013 | Sassuolo | 35 | (0) |
| 2012 | → Nocerina (loan) | 19 | (2) |
| 2013–2014 | Varese | 24 | (0) |
| 2014–2016 | Vicenza | 66 | (1) |
| 2016–2017 | Salernitana | 8 | (0) |
| 2017 | → Avellino (loan) | 20 | (1) |
| 2017–2018 | Avellino | 39 | (3) |
| 2018–2020 | Ascoli | 32 | (0) |
| 2020 | → Triestina (loan) | 4 | (0) |
| 2020–2021 | Ternana | 16 | (2) |
| 2022 | Siena | 16 | (1) |
| 2022–2023 | Rimini | 33 | (0) |
| 2023–2024 | Fermana | 9 | (0) |
| 2024– | Prato | 0 | (0) |
- * Club domestic league appearances and goals as of 26 January 2024

Lorenzo Laverone (born 19 April 1989) is an Italian footballer who plays as a defender for Serie D club Prato.

== Club career ==
Born in Bagno a Ripoli, Tuscany, Laverone started his career at Tuscan club Prato. In 2007, he was signed by Colligiana. The club finished as the triple runner-up in the promotion playoffs and Group E of 2007–08 Serie D, and in 2007–08 Coppa Italia Serie D. The club received a wild card to 2008–09 Lega Pro Seconda Divisione on 31 July.

In 2009 Laverone was signed by Lega Pro Prima Divisione club Arezzo. After the bankruptcy of the club in 2010, Laverone was signed by Serie B club Reggina.

=== Sassuolo ===
In 2011 Laverone was sold to fellow Serie B club Sassuolo in a co-ownership deal in a 3-year contract for €280,000 transfer fee. In January 2012 Laverone was signed by fellow second division club Nocerina.

Laverone returned to Sassuolo in 2012–13 Serie B. The club won promotion to Serie A at the end of season. In June 2013 Reggina gave up the remain 50% registration rights of Laverone to Sassuolo for free. However Laverone was allowed to join Serie B club Varese also for free.

=== Varese ===
Laverone was a player of Varese in 2013–14 Serie B.

=== Vicenza ===
On 26 August 2014 Laverone signed a 2-year contract (later extended to 4) with Vicenza for €500,000 transfer fee, which the club received a wild card to 2014–15 Serie B on 29 August. As part of the deal Tanasiy Kosovan was sold to Varese also for €500,000. Laverone wore no. 27 shirt for Vicenza. He only missed one match in the league that season.

On 12 August 2015 Laverone add one more season to his current contract, lasting to 30 June 2017. However, he was released on 4 July 2016.

=== Salernitana ===
On 5 July 2016 he was signed by Salernitana in a 3-year contract.

=== Ascoli ===
On 4 September 2018, he signed one-year contract with Serie B club Ascoli with one-year extension option.

==== Loan to Triestina ====
On 31 January 2020, he joined Triestina on loan with an option to purchase.

=== Ternana ===
On 24 September 2020, he signed a two-year contract with Ternana. On 31 August 2021, his Ternana contract was terminated by mutual consent.

=== Siena ===
On 25 January 2022, he signed with Siena.

=== Rimini ===
On 15 July 2022, he moved to Serie C club Rimini.

== International career ==
Laverone received call-ups twice from the Italy Universiade Team for training camps, in 2009 and 2015 respectively. Laverone received a doctor's degree in November 2014.
