= Stefano Padovan =

Italian footballer (born 1994)

Personal information
- Date of birth: 16 April 1994 (age 32)
- Place of birth: Turin, Italy
- Height: 1.82 m (6 ft 0 in)
- Position: Forward

Youth career
- –2013: Juventus

Senior career*
Years	Team	Apps	(Gls)
2013–2019	Juventus	0	(0)
2013–2014	→ Pescara (loan)	5	(0)
2014	→ Vicenza (loan)	9	(0)
2014–2015	→ Crotone (loan)	20	(3)
2015–2016	→ Lanciano (loan)	19	(1)
2016–2017	→ Foggia (loan)	17	(3)
2017	→ Pordenone (loan)	14	(3)
2017–2019	→ Casertana (loan)	57	(7)
2019–2022	Imolese	57	(6)
2020–2021	→ Pro Vercelli (loan)	16	(2)
2021	→ Sambenedettese (loan)	5	(0)
2022	United Riccione	13	(3)
2022–2023	Clodiense	13	(3)
2023	Vado	3	(0)
2023–2024	Asti	14	(1)
2024–2025	Castellanzese	19	(0)

International career
2010	Italy U16	3	(1)
2011	Italy U17	2	(1)
2012	Italy U18	4	(3)
2012–2013	Italy U19	15	(3)
2013–2014	Italy U20	4	(3)
- * Club domestic league appearances and goals as of 11 February 2026

Stefano Padovan (born 16 April 1994) is an Italian footballer who plays as a forward.

== Club career ==
=== Juventus ===
Born in Turin, capital of Piedmont region, Padovan was a youth product of hometown club Juventus FC He was the member of U17 team in 2010–11 season as well as the reserve team from 2011 to 2013. Juventus reserve finished as the losing quarter-finalists in 2012–13 season reserve league, as well as winner of the reserve cup.

==== Loan to Pescara and Vicenza ====
On 5 July 2013, Padovan was signed by Serie B club Pescara in a temporary deal, with an option to buy. He was given no.31 shirt of the first team. On 30 September, Padovan made his Serie B debut for Pescara as a substitute replacing Riccardo Maniero in the 87th minute of a 1–1 away draw against Cesena, after the sub his teammate Matteo Politano scored the equalizer goal for Pescara, by an assist from Padovan. Padovan ended his loan to Pescara with only 5 appearances, all as a substitute, and 1 assist.

On 16 January 2014, Padovan was signed by Serie C club Vicenza on a 6-month loan deal. On 26 January he made his Serie C debut for Vicenza as a substitute replacing Giacomo Tulli in the 61st minute of a 2–1 home win over Venezia. On 4 May, Padovan played his first match as a starter, a 2–2 away draw against San Marino Calcio, he was replaced by Tanasiy Kosovan in the 66th minute. Padovan ended his 6-month loan to Vicenza with 10 appearances, as well as the first round of promotion playoffs against Savona.

==== Loan to Crotone ====
On 16 July 2014, Padovan was loaned to Serie B club Crotone on a season-long loan deal with an option to buy. He was given no.18 shirt of the first team. On 17 August, Padovan made his debut for Crotone in a match loss 5–4 at penalties after a 0–0 home draw against Casertana in the second round of Coppa Italia, he was replaced by Ernesto Torregrossa in the 55th minute. On 30 August he made his Serie B debut for Crotone as a substitute replacing Jacopo Dezi in the 72nd minute of a 2–0 home defeat against Ternana. On 17 January 2015, Padovan scored his first goal as a professional footballer, as a substitute, in the 88th minute of a 2–1 away defeat against Ternana. On 29 March, Padovan played his first match as a starter, a 0–0 away draw against Perugia, he was replaced by Michael Rabusic in the 69th minute. On 2 April he scored twice in a 2–0 home win over Spezia. On 18 April he played his first entire match, a 1–1 home draw against Virtus Lanciano. Padovan ended his loan to Crotone with 21 appearances, 3 goals and 1 assist.

==== Loan to Virtus Lanciano ====
On 21 July 2015, Padovan was signed by Serie B side S.S. Virtus Lanciano 1924 on a season-long loan deal with option to buy. He was given no.19 shirt of the first team. On 9 August he made his debut for Virtus Lanciano as a substitute replacing Mohamed Fofana in the 54th minute of a 2–0 home defeat against Juve Stabia in the second round of Coppa Italia. On 6 September he made his Serie B debut for Virtus Lanciano as a substitute replacing Zè Eduardo in the 85th minute of a 2–1 away defeat against Pro Vercelli. On 21 November, Padovan played is first match as a starter, a 1–1 away draw against Virtus Entella, he was replaced by Eric Lanini in the 74th minute. On 5 December he scored his first goal for Virtus Lanciano 64th minute of a 4–1 away defeat against Novara. On 16 January 2016 he played his first entire match for Virtus Lanciano, a 1–0 home win over Pro Vercelli. Padovan ended his season-long loan with 22 appearances, 1 goal and 1 assist.

==== Loan to Foggia and Pordenone ====
On 13 July 2016, Padovan was signed by Serie C side Foggia on a 6-month loan deal. On 29 August he made his Serie C debut for Foggia as a substitute replacing Antonio Letizia in the 63rd minute and in the 76th minute he scored his first goal for Foggia in a 2–1 home win over Fidelis Andria. On 5 September, Padovan scored his second goal, again as a substitute, in the 88th minute of a 2–1 away win over Siracusa. On 15 September he played his first entire match for Foggia, a 1–0 away win over Virtus Francavilla. On 23 October he scored his third goal in the 74th minute of a 4–1 home win over Monopoli. On 27 November, Padovan was sent off with a red card in the 94th minute of a 1–1 home draw against Casertana. Padovan ended his 6-month loan to Foggia with 17 appearances and 3 goals.

On 19 January 2017, Padovan was loaned to Serie C side Pordenone on a 6-month loan deal. On 29 January he made his Serie C debut for Pordenone as a substitute replacing Luca Cattaneo in the 46th minute of a 0–0 home draw against Mantova. On 27 February, Padovan played his first match as a starter, a 6–0 home win over Bassano Virtus, he was replaced Riccardo Martignago in the 79th minute. On 12 March, Padovan scored his first goal for Pordenone and the only goal of the match in the 19th minute of a 1–0 home win over Südtirol. On 19 March he scored his second goal in the 41st minute of a 2–0 away win over Ancona. On 30 April he scored his third goal, as a substitute, in the 91st minute of a 2–1 home defeat against FeralpiSalò. Padovan ended his loan to Pordenone with 19 appearances and 3 goals.

==== Loan to Casertana ====
On 27 July 2017, Padovan was loaned to Serie C side Casertana on a season-long loan deal. On 26 August he made his debut in Serie C for Casertana in a 2–1 away defeat against Catanazaro, in the 81st minute he was sent off with a double yellow card. On 23 September he played his first entire match for Casertana, a 1–0 home defeat against Akragas. On 18 November, Padovan scored his first goal for Casertana, as a substitute, in the 87th minute of a 1–1 away draw against Sicula Leonzio. On 30 December he scored twice in a 2–1 away win over Catania. On 11 February 2018, Padovan was sent-off with a red card in the 55th minute of a 0–0 home draw against Trapani. Padovan ended his season-long loan to Casertana with 31 appearances, 4 goals and 2 assists.

On 27 July 2018 his loan was extended for another season.

=== Imolese ===
On 22 July 2019, he joined Serie C club Imolese on a 2-year contract. On 3 October 2020 he moved on loan to Pro Vercelli. On 1 February 2021 he was loaned to Sambenedettese.

=== United Riccione ===
On 19 August 2022, Padovan moved to United Riccione in Serie D.

== International career ==
Padovan capped for Italian youth teams from U16 to U20. He received his first call-up for 2009 Val-de-Marne tournament, which no documentation of line-up were known. Padovan only able to play for the U17 team in friendlies, however he became a regular for the U19 team in 2012–13 season. Padovan made his U19 debut against Croatia, a friendly match; he scored a brace in 2013 UEFA European Under-19 Championship qualification, against Albania. He made 2 substitute and 1 start in 2013 UEFA European Under-19 Championship elite qualification. Italy was eliminated as the runner-up of that group. That season he also scored a goal against Kazakhstan in a friendly match.

== Career statistics ==
=== Club ===
As of match played 2 February 2022

Club	Season	League			National cup		League cup		Other		Total	
Club	Season	League	Apps	Goals	Apps	Goals	Apps	Goals	Apps	Goals	Apps	Goals
Pescara (loan)	2013–14	Serie B	5	0	0	0	—		—		5	0
Vicenza (loan)	2013–14	Serie C	9	0	—		—		1 (Note: Appearance(s) in Promotion Playoffs)	0	10	0
Crotone (loan)	2014–15	Serie B	20	3	1	0	—		—		21	3
Virtus Lanciano (loan)	2015–16	Serie B	19	1	1	0	—		2 (Note: Appearance(s) in Relegation Playoffs)	0	22	1
Foggia (loan)	2016–17	Serie C	17	3	0	0	3	2	—		20	5
Pordenone (loan)	2016–17	Serie C	14	3	—		—		5	0	19	3
Casertana (loan)	2017–18	Serie C	29	4	—		2	0	2	0	33	4
Casertana (loan)	2018–19	Serie C	28	3	—		1	0	1	0	30	3
Casertana (loan)	Total		57	7	0	0	3	0	3	0	63	7
Imolese	2019–20	Serie C	22	2	3	1	1	1	2	0	28	4
Imolese	2021–22	Serie C	23	3	—		1	0	—		24	3
Imolese	Total		45	5	3	1	2	1	2	0	52	7
Pro Vercelli (loan)	2020–21	Serie C	16	1	—		—		—		16	1
Sambenedettese (loan)	2020–21	Serie C	5	0	—		—		1	0	6	0
Career total			207	23	5	1	8	3	14	0	234	27

== Honours ==
=== Club ===
Juventus Primavera

- Supercoppa Primavera: 2011–12
- Torneo di Viareggio: 2012

Foggia

- Serie C: 2016–17
