= Giacomo Volpe =

Italian footballer

Personal information
- Date of birth: 16 January 1996 (age 30)
- Place of birth: Biella, Italy
- Height: 1.89 m (6 ft 2 1/2 in)
- Position: Goalkeeper

Team information
- Current team: Birkirkara
- Number: 1

Youth career
- –2015: Juventus
- 2013–2014: → Barletta (loan)

Senior career*
Years	Team	Apps	(Gls)
2015–2016	Juventus	0	(0)
2015	→ Corregese (loan)	13	(0)
2015–2016	→ Gubbio (loan)	33	(0)
2016–2018	Gubbio	58	(0)
2018–2021	Cremonese	11	(0)
2021–2022	Foggia	10	(0)
2022–2023	Arzignano	10	(0)
2023–2024	Feralpisalò	1	(0)
2024–	Birkirkara	33	(0)
- * Club domestic league appearances and goals as of 26 June 2025

Giacomo Volpe (born 16 January 1996) is an Italian footballer who plays as a goalkeeper for Maltese club Birkirkara.

== Career ==
He made his Serie C debut for Gubbio on 27 August 2017 in a game against Pordenone.

On 23 August 2021, he signed a one-year contract with Foggia.

On 16 July 2022, Volpe moved to Arzignano on a one-year contract.

On 18 January 2023, Volpe signed with Feralpisalò.
