= Nicolò Pozzebon =

Italian footballer (born 1997)

Personal information
- Date of birth: 3 May 1997 (age 29)
- Place of birth: Paese, Italy
- Height: 1.74 m (5 ft 9 in)
- Position: Forward

Team information
- Current team: Arzachena

Youth career
- –2017: Juventus
- 2014–2015: → Perugia (loan)
- 2016–2017: → Groningen (loan)

Senior career*
Years	Team	Apps	(Gls)
2014–2019	Juventus	0	(0)
2014–2015	→ Perugia (loan)	1	(0)
2016–2017	→ Groningen (loan)	0	(0)
2017	→ Piacenza (loan)	1	(0)
2017–2018	→ Mestre (loan)	2	(0)
2018–2019	→ Juventus U23 (res.)	6	(0)
2019–	Arzachena	18	(5)
- * Club domestic league appearances and goals as of 22:44, 13 January 2020 (UTC)

Nicolò Pozzebon (born 3 May 1997) is an Italian football player. He plays for Arzachena.

== Club career ==
He made his Serie B debut for Perugia on 18 October 2014 in a game against Virtus Lanciano.

For the 2019–20 season, he joined Arzachena in Serie D.
