= Tanasiy Kosovan =

Ukrainian footballer

Personal information
- Full name: Tanasiy Vasylyovych Kosovan
- Date of birth: 3 March 1995 (age 31)
- Place of birth: Banyliv, Ukraine
- Height: 1.85 m (6 ft 1 in)
- Position: Midfielder

Team information
- Current team: Gelbison
- Number: 32

Youth career
- 2004–2012: Vicenza

Senior career*
Years	Team	Apps	(Gls)
2012–2014	Vicenza	4	(0)
2014–2015	Varese	0	(0)
2015	Racing Roma	12	(1)
2016–2017	Gela	26	(4)
2017	Arsenal Kyiv	2	(1)
2018	Igea Virtus	14	(3)
2018–2020	Picerno	60	(13)
2020–2021	Lucchese	17	(0)
2021	Picerno	14	(5)
2021–2022	Cavese	13	(2)
2022	Casertana	15	(0)
2022–2023	Trapani	30	(6)
2023	Lamezia	5	(2)
2023–	Gelbison	5	(0)
- * Club domestic league appearances and goals as of 7 January 2024

Tanasiy Kosovan (Ukrainian: Танасій Васильович Косован; born on 3 March 1995) is a Ukrainian football midfielder who plays for Italian Serie D club Gelbison.

== Career ==
Kosovan was born in Ukraine but moved to Italy when aged 3.

in 2014 he was swapped with Lorenzo Laverone. On 13 January 2015 he was signed by Lupa Castelli Romani.

On 2 September 2020 he joined Lucchese. On 1 March 2021, his contract was terminated by mutual consent for urgent family reasons. He returned to Picerno for the remainder of the 2020–21 season.

On 14 August 2021 he signed with Cavese in Serie D.
