= Strizivojna =

- Municipality
- Municipality of Strizivojna; Općina Strizivojna
- Flag Coat of arms

- Location of Strizivojna in Croatia
- Coordinates: 45.23°N 18.42°E
- Country: Croatia
- Region: Slavonia
- County: Osijek-Baranja County
- Villages: Strizivojna, Merolino Sikirevačko

Government
  - Mayor: Josip Jakobović

Area
  - Municipality: 37.2 km^{2} (14.4 sq mi)
  - Urban: 34.0 km^{2} (13.1 sq mi)

Population (2021)
  - Municipality: 2,027
  - Density: 54.5/km^{2} (141/sq mi)
  - Urban: 2,027
  - Urban density: 59.6/km^{2} (154/sq mi)
- Postal code: 31410
- Website: strizivojna.hr

Strizivojna is a village and a municipality in Osijek-Baranja County, in eastern Croatia, located between Vrpolje and Stari Mikanovci.

In the 2011 census, there were 2,525 inhabitants, absolute majority of whom are Croats. The only other settlement in the municipality was the uninhabited Merolino Sikirevačko.

== See also ==
- Strizivojna–Vrpolje railway station
