= List of Italian football transfers summer 2019 =

This is a list of summer 2019 Italian football transfers featuring at least one Serie A or Serie B club. The transfer window of Serie A was open from 1 July to 2 September 2019, despite some contracts being already signed before the window. Free agents could join any club at any time.

== Transfers ==
Legend Italic text indicates that the player had already left the team on loan in this or the previous season, or was a new signing who immediately left the club.

=== February–May ===
Date	Name	Moving from	Moving to	Fee
11 January 2019 (Note: Effective on 1 July 2019)	(Norway) Morten Thorsby	(Netherlands) Heerenveen	Sampdoria	Free
11 February 2019	(Wales) Aaron Ramsey	(England) Arsenal	Juventus	Free
11 May 2019	(Denmark) Christian Nørgaard	Fiorentina	(England) Brentford	Undisclosed
23 May 2019	(Germany) Jeff Chabot	(Netherlands) Groningen	Sampdoria	Undisclosed
30 May 2019	(Senegal) M'Baye Niang	Torino	(France) Rennes	Undisclosed (Note: The player already played for his new club in 2018–19 season, the deal turned from temporary to definitive.)

=== June ===
Date	Name	Moving from	Moving to	Fee
2 June 2019	(Greece) Dimitris Nikolaou	(Greece) Olympiacos	Empoli	Undisclosed
6 June 2019	Roberto Soriano	(Spain) Villarreal	Bologna	Undisclosed
6 June 2019	Nicola Sansone	(Spain) Villarreal	Bologna	Undisclosed
7 June 2019	Giovanni Di Lorenzo	Empoli	Napoli	Undisclosed
7 June 2019	(Ivory Coast) Koffi Djidji	(France) Nantes	Torino	Undisclosed
11 June 2019	(Croatia) Mato Jajalo	Palermo	Udinese	Free
11 June 2019	(England) Ola Aina	(England) Chelsea	Torino	Undisclosed
13 June 2019	(Serbia) Aleksa Terzić	(Serbia) Red Star Belgrade	Fiorentina	Undisclosed
13 June 2019	(Colombia) Brayan Vera	(Colombia) Leones	Lecce	Undisclosed
17 June 2019	(Netherlands) Moreno Rutten	(Netherlands) VVV-Venlo	Crotone	Undisclosed
18 June 2019	Lorenzo Montipò	Novara	Benevento	Undisclosed
18 June 2019	Biagio Meccariello	Brescia	Lecce	Undisclosed
18 June 2019	Mattia Felici	Nuova Tor Tre Teste	Lecce	Undisclosed
19 June 2019	Eddie Salcedo	Genoa	Inter	Undisclosed
19 June 2019	Matteo Politano	Sassuolo	Inter	Undisclosed
19 June 2019	(Bosnia and Herzegovina) Riad Bajić	Udinese	(Turkey) Konyaspor	Loan
20 June 2019	Riccardo Orsolini	Juventus	Bologna	€15M
21 June 2019	(Colombia) Luis Muriel	(Spain) Sevilla	Atalanta	Undisclosed
21 June 2019	(Argentina) Ezequiel Ponce	Roma	(Russia) Spartak Moscow	Undisclosed
21 June 2019	Fabrizio Cacciatore	Chievo	Cagliari	Undisclosed
22 June 2019	Mattia Bani	Chievo	Bologna	Undisclosed
22 June 2019	(Poland) Paweł Jaroszyński	Chievo	Genoa	Undisclosed
22 June 2019	Fabio Depaoli	Chievo	Sampdoria	Undisclosed
22 June 2019	(Netherlands) Jens Odgaard	Sassuolo	(Netherlands) Heerenveen	Loan
23 June 2019	Roberto Insigne	Napoli	Benevento	Undisclosed
23 June 2019	(Slovenia) Vid Belec	Sampdoria	(Cyprus) APOEL	Loan
25 June 2019	(Argentina) Gonzalo Maroni	(Argentina) Boca Juniors	Sampdoria	Loan
26 June 2019	(Brazil) Igor	(Austria) RB Salzburg	S.P.A.L.	Undisclosed
26 June 2019	(Slovakia) Martin Valjent	Chievo	(Spain) Mallorca	Undisclosed
27 June 2019	(Croatia) Ante Budimir	Crotone	(Spain) Mallorca	Undisclosed
28 June 2019	(Brazil) Gabriel Brazão	Parma	Inter	Undisclosed
28 June 2019	Andrea Adorante	Inter	Parma	Undisclosed
28 June 2019	(Belgium) Zinho Vanheusden	Inter	(Belgium) Standard Liège	Undisclosed
28 June 2019	(Lithuania) Titas Krapikas	Sampdoria	Spezia	Free
28 June 2019	Vincenzo Pinto	Benevento	Spezia	Free
28 June 2019	(Brazil) Everton Luiz	S.P.A.L.	(United States) Real Salt Lake	Undisclosed
29 June 2019	Cristian Galano	Parma	Pescara	Undisclosed
29 June 2019	Alessandro Martella	Pescara	Parma	Undisclosed
29 June 2019	Fabian Pavone	Pescara	Parma	Undisclosed
29 June 2019	(France) Alban Lafont	Fiorentina	(France) Nantes	2-year loan
29 June 2019	(Ukraine) Yevhen Shakhov	(Greece) PAOK	Lecce	Undisclosed
29 June 2019	(Serbia) Vanja Milinković-Savić	Torino	(Belgium) Standard Liège	Undisclosed
30 June 2019	Andrea Pinamonti	Inter	Genoa	Loan
30 June 2019	(Greece) Kostas Manolas	Roma	Napoli	€36M
30 June 2019	Luca Pellegrini	Roma	Juventus	€22M
30 June 2019	Leonardo Spinazzola	Juventus	Roma	€29,5M
30 June 2019	Marco Sala	Inter	Sassuolo	Undisclosed
30 June 2019	(Poland) Dawid Kownacki	Sampdoria	(Germany) Fortuna Düsseldorf	Loan
30 June 2019	(Romania) Romario Benzar	(Romania) Steaua	Lecce	Undisclosed
30 June 2019	(Brazil) Rogério	Juventus	Sassuolo	Undisclosed
30 June 2019	Matteo Pinelli	Juventus	Sassuolo	Undisclosed

=== July ===
Date	Name	Moving from	Moving to	Fee
1 July 2019	(Uruguay) Diego Godín	(Spain) Atlético Madrid	Inter	Free
1 July 2019	(Austria) Valentino Lazaro	(Germany) Hertha BSC	Inter	Undisclosed
1 July 2019	(Guinea) Amadou Diawara	Napoli	Roma	€21M
1 July 2019	Andrea Petagna	Atalanta	S.P.A.L.	Undisclosed
1 July 2019	Lorenzo Dickmann	Novara	S.P.A.L.	Undisclosed
1 July 2019	Mattia Valoti	Verona	S.P.A.L.	Undisclosed
1 July 2019	(Algeria) Mohamed Fares	Verona	S.P.A.L.	Undisclosed
1 July 2019	(France) Adrien Rabiot	(France) PSG	Juventus	Free
1 July 2019	(Czech Republic) Stefan Simić	Milan	(Croatia) Hajduk	Undisclosed
2 July 2019	Stefano Sensi	Sassuolo	Inter	Loan
2 July 2019	(Colombia) Cristián Zapata	Milan	Genoa	Free
2 July 2019	(Czech Republic) Aleš Matějů	(England) Brighton	Brescia	Undisclosed
2 July 2019	(Poland) Michał Marcjanik	Empoli	(Poland) Wisła Płock	Loan
2 July 2019	Davide Marsura	Carpi	Livorno	Free
3 July 2019	(Poland) Filip Jagiełło	(Poland) Zagłębie Lubin	Genoa	Undisclosed
3 July 2019	(Netherlands) Bobby Adekanye	(England) Liverpool	Lazio	Free
3 July 2019	Andrea Tozzo	Sampdoria	Ternana	Undisclosed
3 July 2019	(Brazil) Gabriel	Perugia	Lecce	Free
3 July 2019	(Croatia) Mario Pašalić	(England) Chelsea	Atalanta	Loan
3 July 2019	(Poland) Igor Łasicki	Napoli	(Poland) Pogoń Szczecin	Loan
4 July 2019	Nicholas Rizzo	Inter	Genoa	Undisclosed
4 July 2019	(Slovakia) Denis Vavro	(Denmark) Copenhagen	Lazio	Undisclosed
4 July 2019	(Uruguay) Juan Manuel Ramos	Parma	Spezia	Undisclosed
4 July 2019	(Netherlands) Delano Burgzorg	(Netherlands) De Graafschap	Spezia	Free
4 July 2019	Davide Mazzocco	Padova	S.P.A.L.	Free
4 July 2019	Davide Mazzocco	S.P.A.L.	Pordenone	Loan
4 July 2019	Gianluigi Buffon	(France) PSG	Juventus	Free
4 July 2019	(Colombia) David Ospina	(England) Arsenal	Napoli	Undisclosed
4 July 2019	(Spain) Raúl Albiol	Napoli	(Spain) Villarreal	Undisclosed
4 July 2019	(Netherlands) Jerdy Schouten	(Netherlands) Excelsior	Bologna	Undisclosed
5 July 2019	(France) Lucien Agoumé	(France) Sochaux	Inter	Undisclosed
5 July 2019	(Turkey) Sinan Gümüş	(Turkey) Galatasaray	Genoa	Free
5 July 2019	Mattia Finotto	S.P.A.L.	Monza	Undisclosed
5 July 2019	(Turkey) Merih Demiral	Sassuolo	Juventus	€18M
5 July 2019	Jacopo Giuliani	Spezia	Pontedera	Loan
5 July 2019	Matteo Cotali	Cagliari	Chievo	Undisclosed
5 July 2019	(Slovakia) Dávid Ivan	Sampdoria	Chievo	Undisclosed
5 July 2019	(France) Maxime Leverbe	Sampdoria	Chievo	Undisclosed
5 July 2019	(France) Florian Ayé	(France) Clermont	Brescia	Undisclosed
5 July 2019	(Venezuela) Aristóteles Romero	Crotone	(Albania) Partizani	Loan
6 July 2019	(Albania) Etrit Berisha	Atalanta	S.P.A.L.	Loan
6 July 2019	(France) Théo Hernandez	(Spain) Real Madrid	Milan	Undisclosed
6 July 2019	(Iraq) Ali Adnan	Udinese	(Canada) Vancouver Whitecaps	Undisclosed
6 July 2019	(Poland) Paweł Bochniewicz	Udinese	(Poland) Górnik Zabrze	Undisclosed
6 July 2019	Federico Barba	Chievo	(Spain) Valladolid	Loan
6 July 2019	(Netherlands) Stefano Denswil	(Belgium) Club Brugge	Bologna	Undisclosed
6 July 2019	Riccardo Doratiotto	Cagliari	Olbia	Undisclosed
7 July 2019	Pietro Terracciano	Empoli	Fiorentina	Undisclosed
7 July 2019	(Albania) Kastriot Dermaku	Cosenza	Parma	Free
7 July 2019	(Czech Republic) Martin Graiciar	Fiorentina	(Czech Republic) Sparta Prague	Loan
8 July 2019	Antonio Santurro	Bologna	Sambenedettese	Loan
8 July 2019	Stephan El Shaarawy	Roma	(China) Shanghai Shenhua	€16M
8 July 2019	(Bosnia and Herzegovina) Rade Krunić	Empoli	Milan	Undisclosed
8 July 2019	(France) Vincent Laurini	Fiorentina	Parma	Undisclosed
8 July 2019	(The Gambia) Musa Juwara	Chievo	Bologna	Undisclosed
8 July 2019	Michael D'Eramo	Spezia	Rimini	Loan
8 July 2019	(Colombia) Damir Ceter	Cagliari	Chievo	Loan
8 July 2019	Kevin Piscopo	Genoa	Empoli	Undisclosed
8 July 2019	(Tunisia) Karim Laribi	Verona	Empoli	Loan
8 July 2019	Antonio Santurro	Bologna	Sambenedettese	Loan
8 July 2019	Davide Agazzi	Atalanta	Livorno	Undisclosed
8 July 2019	Santo D'Angelo	Sicula Leonzio	Livorno	Free
9 July 2019	(Japan) Takehiro Tomiyasu	(Belgium) Sint-Truiden	Bologna	Undisclosed
9 July 2019	(Norway) Rafik Zekhnini	Fiorentina	(Netherlands) Twente	Loan
9 July 2019	(Czech Republic) Martin Graiciar	Fiorentina	(Czech Republic) Sparta Prague	Loan
9 July 2019	Marco Pissardo	Inter	Arezzo	Undisclosed
9 July 2019	Mauro Coppolaro	Udinese	Virtus Entella	Undisclosed
9 July 2019	Tommaso Augello	Spezia	Sampdoria	Loan
9 July 2019	Simone Palombi	Lazio	Cremonese	Loan
9 July 2019	Francesco Galuppini	Parma	Renate	Undisclosed
9 July 2019	(Nigeria) David Okereke	Spezia	(Belgium) Club Brugge	Undisclosed
9 July 2019	Leonardo Sernicola	Sassuolo	Virtus Entella	Loan
9 July 2019	Pietro Cianci	Sassuolo	Teramo	Undisclosed
9 July 2019	Luca Ravanelli	Sassuolo	Cremonese	Loan
9 July 2019	Federico Valietti	Genoa	Virtus Entella	Loan
10 July 2019	Marco D'Alessandro	Atalanta	S.P.A.L.	Loan
10 July 2019	(Brazil) Rodrigo Becão	(Brazil) Bahia	Udinese	Undisclosed
10 July 2019	Luigi Sepe	Napoli	Parma	Loan
10 July 2019	Alberto Grassi	Napoli	Parma	Loan
10 July 2019	Michele Di Gregorio	Inter	Pordenone	Loan
10 July 2019	Antonio Barreca	Monaco	Genoa	Loan
10 July 2019	Federico Mattiello	Atalanta	Cagliari	Loan
10 July 2019	Luca Zamparo	Reggio Audace	Parma	Free
10 July 2019	Luca Zamparo	Parma	Rimini	Loan
10 July 2019	Emanuele Matino	Parma	Cavese	Loan
10 July 2019	Walid Cheddira	Sangiustese	Parma	Free
10 July 2019	(Spain) Pau López	(Spain) Real Betis	Roma	€16M
10 July 2019	Marco Crocchianti	Spezia	Südtirol	Loan
10 July 2019	(Uruguay) Felipe Avenatti	Bologna	(Belgium) Standard Liège	Undisclosed
10 July 2019	Lorenzo Filippini	Lazio	Gubbio	Undisclosed
10 July 2019	Luca Germoni	Lazio	Juve Stabia	Undisclosed
10 July 2019	(Finland) Abukar Mohamed	Lazio	(Ukraine) Karpaty Lviv	Loan
10 July 2019	Giorgio Spizzichino	Lazio	Pro Patria	Undisclosed
10 July 2019	Davide Zappella	Empoli	Piacenza	Loan
10 July 2019	(Argentina) Marcos Curado	Genoa	Crotone	Loan
10 July 2019	Gabriele Bellodi	Milan	Crotone	Loan
10 July 2019	(Ivory Coast) Willy Ta Bi	Atalanta	Pescara	Loan
10 July 2019	Mattia Proietti	Pescara	Ternana	Undisclosed
10 July 2019	Alexis Ferrante	Pescara	Ternana	Loan
10 July 2019	Jacopo Manconi	Novara	Perugia	Undisclosed
10 July 2019	(Switzerland) Michel Morganella	Padova	Livorno	Free
11 July 2019	(Belgium) Xian Emmers	Inter	(Belgium) Waasland-Beveren	Loan
11 July 2019	(Spain) Iván Marcano	Roma	(Portugal) Porto	€3M
11 July 2019	(Germany) Jeremy Toljan	(Germany) Borussia Dortmund	Sassuolo	Loan
11 July 2019	Simone Colombi	Carpi	Parma	Undisclosed
11 July 2019	(Finland) Jesse Joronen	(Denmark) Copenhagen	Brescia	Undisclosed
11 July 2019	Matteo Bachini	Spezia	ArzignanoChiampo	Undisclosed
11 July 2019	Salvatore Esposito	S.P.A.L.	Chievo	Loan
11 July 2019	(Bosnia and Herzegovina) Matej Rodin	(Bosnia and Herzegovina) Željezničar	Perugia	Undisclosed
11 July 2019	Salvatore Elia	Atalanta	Juve Stabia	Loan
11 July 2019	Alessandro Mallamo	Atalanta	Juve Stabia	Loan
12 July 2019	(Argentina) Cristian Romero	Genoa	Juventus	€25M
12 July 2019	(Argentina) Cristian Romero	Juventus	Genoa	Loan
12 July 2019	Manuel Lazzari	S.P.A.L.	Lazio	Undisclosed
12 July 2019	Alessandro Murgia	Lazio	S.P.A.L.	Undisclosed
12 July 2019	(Romania) Ionuț Radu	Genoa	Inter	Undisclosed
12 July 2019	(Romania) Ionuț Radu	Inter	Genoa	Undisclosed
12 July 2019	(Brazil) Hernani	(Russia) Zenit	Parma	Loan
12 July 2019	Nicolò Barella	Cagliari	Inter	Loan
12 July 2019	Gianluca Lapadula	Genoa	Lecce	Loan
12 July 2019	(Brazil) Gerson	Roma	(Brazil) Flamengo	€11,8M
12 July 2019	(Denmark) Joachim Andersen	Sampdoria	(France) Olympique Lyonnais	Undisclosed
12 July 2019	(Cyprus) Andreas Karo	(Cyprus) Apollon Limassol	Lazio	Undisclosed
12 July 2019	Fabrizio Brignani	Bologna	Cesena	Loan
12 July 2019	(Colombia) Juan Manuel Valencia	Bologna	Cesena	Loan
12 July 2019	Luca Rossettini	Genoa	Lecce	Undisclosed
12 July 2019	(Ivory Coast) Hamed Junior Traorè	Empoli	Sassuolo	2-year loan
12 July 2019	Marco Firenze	Crotone	Salernitana	Undisclosed
12 July 2019	Luigi Carillo	Genoa	Salernitana	Loan
12 July 2019	Biagio Morrone	Juventus	Salernitana	Free
12 July 2019	Vincenzo Garofalo	Salernitana	Sambenedettese	Undisclosed
12 July 2019	Luca Strizzolo	Cremonese	Pordenone	Loan
12 July 2019	Ferdinando Del Sole	Juventus	Juve Stabia	Loan
13 July 2019	(Colombia) Jeison Murillo	(Spain) Valencia	Sampdoria	Loan
13 July 2019	(Sweden) Filip Helander	Bologna	(Scotland) Rangers	Undisclosed
13 July 2019	(Ghana) Emmanuel Badu	Udinese	Verona	Loan
13 July 2019	Mirco Antenucci	S.P.A.L.	Bari	Undisclosed
13 July 2019	Filippo Costa	S.P.A.L.	Napoli	Undisclosed
13 July 2019	Francesco Caputo	Empoli	Sassuolo	Undisclosed
13 July 2019	Filippo Bandinelli	Sassuolo	Empoli	Undisclosed
13 July 2019	Leonardo Mancuso	Juventus	Empoli	Undisclosed
13 July 2019	Emilio Volpicelli	Salernitana	Sambenedettese	Loan
13 July 2019	Christian Capone	Atalanta	Perugia	Loan
13 July 2019	Enrico Del Prato	Atalanta	Livorno	Loan
13 July 2019	(Poland) Tomasz Kupisz	Ascoli	Bari	Undisclosed
13 July 2019	Michael Folorunsho	Virtus Francavilla	Napoli	Undisclosed
14 July 2019	Manuel Scavone	Parma	Bari	Undisclosed
14 July 2019	Pierluigi Frattali	Parma	Bari	Undisclosed
14 July 2019	Gianluca Scamacca	Sassuolo	Ascoli	Loan
14 July 2019	Giovanni Pinto	Parma	Catania	Undisclosed
14 July 2019	Sebastiano Longo	Parma	Potenza	Loan
15 July 2019	Davide Frattesi	Sassuolo	Empoli	Loan
15 July 2019	Federico Ricci	Sassuolo	Spezia	Loan
15 July 2019	(Croatia) Martin Erlić	Sassuolo	Spezia	Undisclosed
15 July 2019	Riccardo Marchizza	Sassuolo	Spezia	Loan
15 July 2019	Matteo Rover	Inter	Südtirol	Loan
15 July 2019	Federico Ermacora	Udinese	Triestina	Loan
15 July 2019	Riccardo Moreo	Prato	Cosenza	Undisclosed
15 July 2019	(Serbia) Boris Radunović	Atalanta	Verona	Loan
15 July 2019	(France) Jean-Claude Billong	Benevento	Salernitana	Undisclosed
15 July 2019	Marco Carraro	Atalanta	Perugia	Loan
15 July 2019	(Argentina) Claudio Spinelli	Genoa	(Argentina) Gimnasia	Loan
15 July 2019	Michael Folorunsho	Napoli	Bari	2-year loan
15 July 2019	Filippo Costa	Napoli	Bari	2-year loan
15 July 2019	Tommaso Pobega	Milan	Pordenone	Loan
16 July 2019	Roberto Inglese	Napoli	Parma	Loan
16 July 2019	Antonio Junior Vacca	Parma	Venezia	Undisclosed
16 July 2019	(Ukraine) Ruslan Malinovskyi	(Belgium) Genk	Atalanta	Undisclosed
16 July 2019	Mattia Trovato	Fiorentina	Cosenza	2-year loan
16 July 2019	(Germany) Oliver Kragl	Benevento	Benevento	Free
16 July 2019	(Cameroon) Nembot Yacine	Benevento	Potenza	Loan
16 July 2019	Gianluca Di Chiara	Benevento	Perugia	Loan
16 July 2019	Pietro Iemmello	Benevento	Perugia	Loan
16 July 2019	(Belgium) Mardochee Nzita	(Belgium) Anderlecht	Perugia	Undisclosed
16 July 2019	Mattia Vitale	S.P.A.L.	Frosinone	Loan
17 July 2019	(France) Yann Karamoh	Inter	Parma	Loan
17 July 2019	(Guadeloupe) Andreaw Gravillon	Inter	Sassuolo	Loan
17 July 2019	(Senegal) Joel Baraye	Virtus Entella	Padova	Loan
17 July 2019	Manuel De Luca	Torino	Virtus Entella	Loan
17 July 2019	(Mali) Molla Wagué	Udinese	(France) Nantes	Undisclosed
17 July 2019	Marco Tumminello	Atalanta	Pescara	Loan
17 July 2019	Niccolò Giannetti	Cagliari	Salernitana	Undisclosed
17 July 2019	Cristiano Lombardi	Lazio	Salernitana	Undisclosed
17 July 2019	(Albania) Angelo Ndrecka	Chievo	Lazio	Undisclosed
17 July 2019	(Morocco) Sofian Kiyine	Chievo	Lazio	Undisclosed
17 July 2019	(Morocco) Sofian Kiyine	Lazio	Salernitana	Undisclosed
17 July 2019	Francesco Deli	Foggia	Cremonese	Free
17 July 2019	Guglielmo Vicario	Venezia	Cagliari	Undisclosed
17 July 2019	(Spain) Paolo Fernandes	(England) Manchester City	Perugia	Loan
17 July 2019	Gianluca Mancini	Atalanta	Roma	Loan
17 July 2019	(Moldova) Vitalie Damașcan	Torino	(Netherlands) Fortuna Sittard	Loan
17 July 2019	Nunzio Lella	Cagliari	Olbia	Loan
17 July 2019	Alberto Pomini	Palermo	Venezia	Free
17 July 2019	Daniele Verde	Roma	(Greece) AEK Athens	Undisclosed
17 July 2019	Andrea Colpani	Atalanta	Trapani	Loan
17 July 2019	Gregorio Luperini	Unattached	Trapani	Free
17 July 2019	Fabio Mazzeo	Foggia	Livorno	Free
17 July 2019	Nicola Dalmonte	Genoa	(Switzerland) Lugano	Loan
18 July 2019	(Netherlands) Matthijs de Ligt	(Netherlands) Ajax	Juventus	€75M
18 July 2019	Tommaso Brignoli	Inter	Pro Patria	Undisclosed
18 July 2019	Manuel Lombardoni	Inter	Pro Patria	Undisclosed
18 July 2019	Lorenzo Gavioli	Inter	Venezia	Loan
18 July 2019	(Serbia) Nikola Pejović	Empoli	(Croatia) Lokomotiva	Undisclosed
18 July 2019	Giuseppe Borello	Crotone	Cesena	Loan
18 July 2019	Riccardo Maniero	Novara	Pescara	Free
18 July 2019	Massimiliano Busellato	Foggia	Pescara	Free
18 July 2019	(Bulgaria) Ivaylo Chochev	Palermo	Pescara	Free
18 July 2019	(Brazil) Nicolas Andrade	Verona	Udinese	Undisclosed
18 July 2019	Gian Filippo Felicioli	Milan	Venezia	Undisclosed
18 July 2019	Alberto Brignoli	Palermo	Empoli	Free
18 July 2019	Roberto Pirrello	Palermo	Empoli	Free
18 July 2019	Stefano Moreo	Palermo	Empoli	Free
18 July 2019	Kevin Cannavò	Palermo	Empoli	Free
18 July 2019	Michele Camporese	Foggia	Pordenone	Free
18 July 2019	Armando Anastasio	Napoli	Monza	Undisclosed
18 July 2019	(Croatia) Karlo Butić	Torino	Cesena	Loan
19 July 2019	(Germany) Koray Günter	Genoa	Verona	Loan
19 July 2019	Andrea Cagnano	Inter	Novara	Undisclosed
19 July 2019	(Spain) Cristo González	(Spain) Castilla	Udinese	Undisclosed
19 July 2019	(Cyprus) Andreas Karo	Lazio	Salernitana	Loan
19 July 2019	Alessandro Rossi	Lazio	Juve Stabia	Loan
19 July 2019	Niccolò Manfredini	Spezia	Benevento	Free
19 July 2019	Lorenzo Ruggiero	Genoa	Perugia	Loan
19 July 2019	Luca Crosta	Cagliari	Olbia	Loan
19 July 2019	(Albania) Giacomo Vrioni	Sampdoria	Cittadella	Loan
19 July 2019	Gabriele Perretta	Empoli	Arzignano	Loan
19 July 2019	Giuseppe Montaperto	Empoli	Pianese	Loan
19 July 2019	Niccolò Ricchi	Empoli	Ravenna	Loan
19 July 2019	Simone Canestrelli	Empoli	AlbinoLeffe	Undisclosed
19 July 2019	(Brazil) Gabriel Brazão	Inter	(Spain) Albacete	Loan
20 July 2019	Alessandro Mattioli	Inter	Modena	Undisclosed
20 July 2019	(Portugal) Miguel Veloso	Genoa	Verona	Free
20 July 2019	Luca Sparandeo	Benevento	Virtus Francavilla	Loan
20 July 2019	(France) Jordan Veretout	Fiorentina	Roma	Loan
20 July 2019	Fabrizio Caligara	Cagliari	Venezia	Loan
20 July 2019	(Portugal) Carlos Vinícius	Napoli	(Poland) Benfica	Undisclosed
21 July 2019	Alessandro Capello	Cagliari	Venezia	Undisclosed
22 July 2019	Enrico Bearzotti	Verona	Modena	Undisclosed
22 July 2019	Marco Sau	Sampdoria	Benevento	Free
22 July 2019	Giuseppe Stancampiano	Unattached	Trapani	Free
23 July 2019	(Serbia) Strahinja Tanasijević	Chievo	(France) Paris	Loan
23 July 2019	Nikita Contini	Napoli	Virtus Entella	Loan
23 July 2019	Filippo Melegoni	Atalanta	Pescara	Loan
23 July 2019	Daniele Sciaudone	Novara	Cosenza	Undisclosed
23 July 2019	Salvatore Tazza	Benevento	Arzignano	Loan
23 July 2019	Michele Cremonesi	S.P.A.L.	Venezia	Undisclosed
23 July 2019	Danilo Russo	Casertana	Juve Stabia	Free
23 July 2019	(Croatia) Marko Rog	Napoli	Cagliari	Loan
23 July 2019	(Belgium) Stéphane Oméonga	Genoa	(Belgium) Cercle Brugge	Loan
24 July 2019	(Netherlands) Timo Letschert	Sassuolo	(Germany) Hamburger SV	Undisclosed
24 July 2019	(Equatorial Guinea) Pedro Obiang	(England) West Ham	Sassuolo	Undisclosed
24 July 2019	Marco Perrotta	Pescara	Bari	Undisclosed
24 July 2019	Mattia Mustacchio	Perugia	Crotone	Undisclosed
24 July 2019	Nicola Rigoni	Chievo	Monza	Undisclosed
24 July 2019	(France) Arthur Yamga	Chievo	(Portugal) Aves	Undisclosed
24 July 2019	(Denmark) Andreas Skov Olsen	(Denmark) Nordsjælland	Bologna	Undisclosed
24 July 2019	Davide Di Gennaro	Lazio	Juve Stabia	Loan
24 July 2019	(Romania) Deian Boldor	Verona	(Albania) Partizani	Loan
24 July 2019	(Serbia) Ivan Lakićević	Genoa	Venezia	Loan
24 July 2019	(North Macedonia) Eljif Elmas	(Turkey) Fenerbahçe	Napoli	Undisclosed
24 July 2019	Andrea Mazzarani	Salernitana	Catania	Undisclosed
24 July 2019	Alessandro Quaini	Genoa	Pisa	Undisclosed
24 July 2019	Alessandro Quaini	Pisa	AlbinoLeffe	Loan
24 July 2019	Davide Marfella	Napoli	Bari	Undisclosed
24 July 2019	Andrea Schiavone	Venezia	Bari	Free
24 July 2019	Leonardo Candellone	Torino	Pordenone	Loan
25 July 2019	Salvatore Bocchetti	(Russia) Spartak Moscow	Verona	Free
25 July 2019	Claudio Morra	Pro Vercelli	Virtus Entella	Undisclosed
25 July 2019	(Finland) Lassi Lappalainen	Bologna	(Canada) Montreal Impact	Loan
25 July 2019	Ivan Rondanini	Cremonese	Padova	Undisclosed
25 July 2019	Guglielmo Vicario	Cagliari	Perugia	Loan
25 July 2019	(Argentina) Franco Zuculini	(Argentina) Colón	Venezia	Free
25 July 2019	Simone Lo Faso	Palermo	Lecce	Free
25 July 2019	Antonino Gallo	Palermo	Lecce	Free
25 July 2019	Alessandro Salvi	Palermo	Frosinone	Free
25 July 2019	(Poland) Przemysław Szymiński	Palermo	Frosinone	Free
25 July 2019	Marco Carnesecchi	Atalanta	Trapani	Loan
25 July 2019	Giulio Favale	Pisa	Reggio Audace	Loan
25 July 2019	Alessandro Coppola	Sondrio	Livorno	Free
25 July 2019	(Argentina) Braian Volpini	(Malta) Senglea	Livorno	Free
26 July 2019	Jacopo Dezi	Parma	Empoli	Loan
26 July 2019	(Slovenia) Leo Štulac	Parma	Empoli	Undisclosed
26 July 2019	Francesco Cassata	Sassuolo	Genoa	Loan
26 July 2019	Alessandro Russo	Genoa	Sassuolo	Undisclosed
26 July 2019	Federico Di Francesco	Sassuolo	S.P.A.L.	Loan
26 July 2019	Andrea Settembrini	Cittadella	Virtus Entella	Free
26 July 2019	(North Macedonia) Ilija Nestorovski	Palermo	Udinese	Free
26 July 2019	(Hungary) Gergely Hutvágner	Sampdoria	(Hungary) Siófok	Loan
26 July 2019	(Morocco) Hamza El Kaouakibi	Bologna	Piacenza	Loan
27 July 2019	Gaetano Monachello	Atalanta	Pordenone	Loan
27 July 2019	Manuel Nocciolini	Parma	Ravenna	Loan
27 July 2019	Vincenzo Mustacciolo	Parma	Ravenna	Loan
27 July 2019	Stefano Antezza	Spezia	Viterbese	Loan
28 July 2019	(Venezuela) Darwin Machís	Udinese	(Spain) Granada	Undisclosed
28 July 2019	Giacomo Calò	Juve Stabia	Genoa	Undisclosed
28 July 2019	Giacomo Calò	Genoa	Juve Stabia	Loan
28 July 2019	(North Macedonia) Nikola Jakimovski	Unattached	Trapani	Free
29 July 2019	Stefano Scognamillo	Parma	Trapani	Undisclosed
29 July 2019	Cristian Cauz	Parma	Trapani	Loan
29 July 2019	Francesco Golfo	Parma	Trapani	Loan
29 July 2019	Andrea Dini	Parma	Trapani	Loan
29 July 2019	Alessandro Giacomel	Empoli	Virtus Verona	Undisclosed
29 July 2019	Marco Curto	Empoli	Virtus Verona	Loan
29 July 2019	Davide Seminara	Empoli	Pianese	Loan
29 July 2019	(Kosovo) Ismet Sinani	Milan	Sicula Leonzio	Loan
29 July 2019	Pasquale Schiattarella	S.P.A.L.	Benevento	Free
30 July 2019	Patrick Cutrone	Milan	(England) Wolverhampton	Undisclosed
30 July 2019	Fabrizio Alastra	Palermo	Parma	Free
30 July 2019	(Brazil) Vitor Hugo	Fiorentina	(Brazil) Palmeiras	Undisclosed
30 July 2019	Jérémie Broh	Sassuolo	Cosenza	Loan
30 July 2019	(Brazil) Gustavo Cipriano	(Brazil) Santos	Lazio	Loan
30 July 2019	(Poland) Petar Brlek	Genoa	Ascoli	Loan
30 July 2019	Alberto Gerbo	Foggia	Ascoli	Free
30 July 2019	Nadir Zortea	Atalanta	Cremonese	2-year loan
30 July 2019	Marco Pinato	Sassuolo	Pisa	Loan
30 July 2019	Agostino Rizzo	Palermo	Livorno	Free
30 July 2019	Eugenio D'Ursi	Napoli	Bari	2-year loan
31 July 2019	(Ghana) Kevin-Prince Boateng	Sassuolo	Fiorentina	Undisclosed
31 July 2019	Elia Giani	Sassuolo	Pisa	Undisclosed
31 July 2019	Andrea Meroni	Pisa	Sassuolo	Undisclosed
31 July 2019	Andrea Meroni	Sassuolo	Pisa	2-year loan
31 July 2019	(Romania) Marius Marin	Sassuolo	Pisa	Undisclosed
31 July 2019	Alessandro Bordin	Roma	Spezia	Undisclosed
31 July 2019	Alessandro Bordin	Spezia	Pistoiese	Loan
31 July 2019	Salvatore Monaco	Perugia	Cosenza	Loan
31 July 2019	Ivan Varone	Cosenza	Reggio Audace	Undisclosed
31 July 2019	Francesco Orlando	Salernitana	Sambenedettese	Loan
31 July 2019	Andrea Marino	Salernitana	Rieti	Undisclosed
31 July 2019	(France) Guillaume Gigliotti	Salernitana	Crotone	Undisclosed
31 July 2019	Danilo Gaeta	Salernitana	Paganese	Undisclosed
31 July 2019	(Lithuania) Marius Adamonis	Lazio	Catanzaro	Loan
31 July 2019	Antonio Candela	Genoa	Trapani	Loan
31 July 2019	(Switzerland) Marin Čavar	(Switzerland) Winterthur	Chievo	Undisclosed
31 July 2019	Felice D'Amico	Inter	Sampdoria	Loan
31 July 2019	Luca Vido	Atalanta	Crotone	Loan

=== August ===
Date	Name	Moving from	Moving to	Fee
1 August 2019	(Portugal) Rafael Leão	(France) Lille	Milan	Undisclosed
1 August 2019	(Portugal) Tiago Djaló	Milan	(France) Lille	Undisclosed
1 August 2019	Alessandro Plizzari	Milan	Livorno	Loan
1 August 2019	Elio Capradossi	Roma	Spezia	Undisclosed
1 August 2019	(Spain) Pol Lirola	Sassuolo	Fiorentina	Loan
1 August 2019	(Senegal) Franck Kanouté	Pescara	Cosenza	Loan
1 August 2019	Daniele Paponi	Juve Stabia	Piacenza	Undisclosed
1 August 2019	Erasmo Mulè	Sampdoria	Juventus	Undisclosed
1 August 2019	Marco Pompetti	Inter	Sampdoria	Loan
1 August 2019	(Portugal) João Gomes Ricciulli	Sampdoria	Vis Pesaro	Undisclosed
1 August 2019	(Portugal) João Nobrega	Sampdoria	(Portugal) Paços de Ferreira	Undisclosed
1 August 2019	Giovanni Volpicelli	Benevento	Arezzo	Undisclosed
2 August 2019	(Uruguay) Jaime Báez	Fiorentina	Cosenza	Undisclosed
2 August 2019	Raffaele Schiavi	Salernitana	Cosenza	Undisclosed
2 August 2019	(Portugal) Bruno Jordão	Lazio	(England) Wolverhampton	Undisclosed
2 August 2019	(Portugal) Pedro Neto	Lazio	(England) Wolverhampton	Undisclosed
2 August 2019	Nicola Tintori	Inter	Gozzano	Loan
2 August 2019	Marco Frediani	Parma	Sambenedettese	Loan
2 August 2019	Facundo Lescano	Parma	Sicula Leonzio	Undisclosed
2 August 2019	Nicola Mosti	Juventus	Monza	Loan
2 August 2019	(Argentina) Mariano Julio Izco	Cosenza	Juve Stabia	Free
2 August 2019	Salvatore Longo	Fiorentina	Bisceglie	Loan
3 August 2019	Michele Zinfollino	Fiorentina	Cagliari	Loan
3 August 2019	(Slovakia) Dávid Hancko	Fiorentina	(Czech Republic) Sparta Prague	Loan
3 August 2019	(Ivory Coast) Ben Lhassine Kone	Torino	Cosenza	Loan
3 August 2019	Fabio Maistro	Rieti	Lazio	Undisclosed
3 August 2019	Fabio Maistro	Lazio	Salernitana	Loan
3 August 2019	Lorenzo Carissoni	Torino	Lecco	Loan
3 August 2019	Antonio Palumbo	Sampdoria	Ternana	Loan
3 August 2019	(Ecuador) Erick Ferigra	Torino	Ascoli	Loan
3 August 2019	(Argentina) Franco Ferrari	Napoli	Bari	2-year loan
4 August 2019	(Algeria) Ismaël Bennacer	Empoli	Milan	Loan
4 August 2019	Moise Kean	Juventus	(England) Everton	€27,5M
5 August 2019	(Belgium) Radja Nainggolan	Inter	Cagliari	Loan
5 August 2019	(Croatia) Milan Badelj	Lazio	Fiorentina	Loan
5 August 2019	Alessandro Lovisa	Pordenone	Fiorentina	Undisclosed
5 August 2019	(Luxembourg) Dany Mota	Virtus Entella	Juventus	Undisclosed
6 August 2019	(Czech Republic) Jaromír Zmrhal	(Czech Republic) SK Slavia Prague	Brescia	Undisclosed
6 August 2019	(Brazil) Rafael Cabral	Sampdoria	(England) Reading	Undisclosed
6 August 2019	(Serbia) Darko Lazović	Genoa	Verona	Free
6 August 2019	Lorenzo Saporetti	Parma	Catania	Undisclosed
6 August 2019	Luca Castiglia	Salernitana	Padova	Loan
6 August 2019	Mirko Carretta	Cremonese	Cosenza	Undisclosed
6 August 2019	Marco Sala	Sassuolo	Virtus Entella	Loan
6 August 2019	(Spain) Raúl Asencio	Genoa	Pisa	Loan
6 August 2019	Umberto Eusepi	Pisa	Alessandria	Loan
7 August 2019	(England) Darren Buffonge	(England) Manchester United	Spezia	Free
7 August 2019	Giangiacomo Magnani	Sassuolo	Brescia	Loan
7 August 2019	(Brazil) Léo Duarte	(Brazil) Flamengo	Milan	Undisclosed
7 August 2019	Riccardo Saponara	Fiorentina	Genoa	Loan
7 August 2019	(Romania) George Pușcaș	Inter	(England) Reading	Undisclosed
7 August 2019	(Brazil) Danilo	(England) Manchester City	Juventus	€37M
7 August 2019	(Portugal) João Cancelo	Juventus	(England) Manchester City	€65M
7 August 2019	(Netherlands) Rick Karsdorp	Roma	(Netherlands) Feyenoord	Loan
7 August 2019	(Poland) Paweł Jaroszyński	Genoa	Salernitana	Loan
7 August 2019	Pietro Ceccaroni	Spezia	Venezia	Loan
8 August 2019	(Belgium) Romelu Lukaku	(England) Manchester United	Inter	Undisclosed
8 August 2019	(Slovenia) Jure Balkovec	Verona	Empoli	Loan
8 August 2019	(Colombia) Kevin Agudelo	(Colombia) Atlético Huila	Genoa	Undisclosed
8 August 2019	(Hungary) Ádám Nagy	Bologna	(England) Bristol City	Undisclosed
8 August 2019	(Belgium) Dennis Praet	Sampdoria	(England) Leicester	Undisclosed
8 August 2019	Alessio Cerci	(Turkey) Ankaragücü	Salernitana	Free
8 August 2019	Leonardo Gatto	Virtus Entella	Triestina	Loan
9 August 2019	(Slovakia) Martin Škrtel	(Turkey) Fenerbahçe	Atalanta	Free
9 August 2019	(Chile) Erick Pulgar	Bologna	Fiorentina	Undisclosed
9 August 2019	Luca Rizzo	Bologna	Livorno	Loan
9 August 2019	(Uruguay) Nahitan Nández	(Argentina) Boca Juniors	Cagliari	Undisclosed
9 August 2019	(Croatia) Lorenco Šimić	Sampdoria	(Croatia) HNK Rijeka	Loan
9 August 2019	Marco Imperiale	Empoli	Piacenza	Loan
9 August 2019	Michele Volpe	Frosinone	Viterbese	Loan
9 August 2019	Andrea Errico	Frosinone	Viterbese	Loan
9 August 2019	Cristian Bunino	Pescara	Padova	Loan
9 August 2019	Daniel Ciofani	Frosinone	Cremonese	Undisclosed
9 August 2019	Nicholas Pierini	Sassuolo	Cosenza	Loan
9 August 2019	Cristian Dell'Orco	Sassuolo	Lecce	Loan
9 August 2019	Raffaele Celia	Sassuolo	Alessandria	Loan
9 August 2019	(Bulgaria) Petko Hristov	Fiorentina	Bisceglie	Loan
9 August 2019	Andrea Schenetti	Cittadella	Virtus Entella	Undisclosed
9 August 2019	Giuseppe Esposito	Napoli	Bari	Undisclosed
9 August 2019	Andrea Tiritiello	Cosenza	Virtus Francavilla	Undisclosed
9 August 2019	(Denmark) Lasse Schöne	(Netherlands) Ajax	Genoa	Undisclosed
9 August 2019	Gennaro Tutino	Napoli	Verona	Loan
10 August 2019	Valerio Verre	Sampdoria	Verona	Loan
11 August 2019	(Spain) Mamadou Tounkara	Lazio	Viterbese	Undisclosed
12 August 2019	Simone Pasa	Cittadella	Pordenone	Undisclosed
12 August 2019	(Switzerland) Nicolas Haas	Atalanta	Frosinone	Loan
12 August 2019	Fabio Eguelfi	Atalanta	Frosinone	Loan
12 August 2019	(France) Mehdi Léris	Chievo	Sampdoria	Undisclosed
12 August 2019	(Spain) Salva Ferrer	(Spain) Gimnàstic de Tarragona	Spezia	Undisclosed
12 August 2019	Gianluca Carpani	Ascoli	Fano	Undisclosed
12 August 2019	(Brazil) Walace	(Germany) Hannover 96	Udinese	Undisclosed
12 August 2019	Christian Langella	Pisa	Palermo	Loan
12 August 2019	Giuseppe Carriero	Parma	Monopoli	Loan
13 August 2019	(Croatia) Ivan Perišić	Inter	(Germany) Bayern Munich	Loan
13 August 2019	(Argentina) Facundo Colidio	Inter	(Belgium) Sint-Truiden	Loan
13 August 2019	Roberto Zammarini	Pisa	Pordenone	Loan
13 August 2019	Simone Perilli	Pordenone	Pisa	Undisclosed
13 August 2019	(Switzerland) Nedim Bajrami	(Switzerland) Grasshoppers	Empoli	Loan
13 August 2019	(Sweden) Marcus Rohdén	Crotone	Frosinone	Free
13 August 2019	(Greece) Nikolaos Baxevanos	Lazio	(Greece) Panionios	2-year loan
13 August 2019	(Spain) Cristo González	Udinese	(Spain) Huesca	Loan
13 August 2019	Ettore Gliozzi	Sassuolo	Monza	2-year loan
13 August 2019	Federico Nacci	Pisa	Lecco	Loan
13 August 2019	Andrea Rispoli	Palermo	Lecce	Free
14 August 2019	Raffaele Pucino	Salernitana	Ascoli	Undisclosed
15 August 2019	Simone Magnaghi	Pordenone	Teramo	Loan
16 August 2019	Samuele Longo	Inter	(Spain) Deportivo La Coruña	Loan
16 August 2019	(Turkey) Mert Çetin	(Turkey) Gençlerbirliği	Roma	€3M
16 August 2019	(France) Steven Nzonzi	Roma	(Turkey) Galatasaray	Loan
16 August 2019	Lorenzo Del Prete	Juventus U23	Trapani	Undisclosed
16 August 2019	Alberto De Francesco	Spezia	Reggina	Undisclosed
16 August 2019	Gabriele Angella	Udinese	Perugia	Undisclosed
16 August 2019	(Brazil) Diego Farias	Cagliari	Lecce	Loan
16 August 2019	Nicolò Fazzi	Atalanta	Padova	Undisclosed
17 August 2019	Matteo Bianchetti	Verona	Cremonese	Free
18 August 2019	Mario Balotelli	(France) Olympique de Marseille	Brescia	Free
19 August 2019	(Ghana) Godfred Donsah	Bologna	(Belgium) Cercle Brugge	Loan
19 August 2019	Simone Scuffet	Udinese	Spezia	Loan
19 August 2019	Luca Pellegrini	Juventus	Cagliari	Loan
19 August 2019	Gabriele Rolando	Sampdoria	Reggina	Undisclosed
19 August 2019	Antonio Mazzotta	Palermo	Crotone	Free
19 August 2019	(Romania) Adrian Stoian	Unattached	Livorno	Free
19 August 2019	Marco Marozzi	Fiorentina	Virtus Francavilla	Loan
19 August 2019	(Uruguay) Edgar Elizalde	Pescara	Catanzaro	Loan
20 August 2019	Davide Merola	Inter	Empoli	Undisclosed
20 August 2019	(Argentina) Julián Illanes	Fiorentina	Avellino	Loan
20 August 2019	(Democratic Republic of the Congo) Luzayadio Bangu	Fiorentina	Gubbio	Loan
20 August 2019	(Croatia) Marko Pajač	Cagliari	Genoa	Loan
20 August 2019	Lorenzo Lollo	Empoli	Venezia	Undisclosed
20 August 2019	(Turkey) Mert Müldür	(Austria) Rapid Wien	Sassuolo	Undisclosed
20 August 2019	(Guinea) Karamoko Cissé	Verona	Juve Stabia	Loan
20 August 2019	Leonardo Pérez	Cosenza	Virtus Francavilla	Undisclosed
20 August 2019	Davide Luppi	Viterbese	Cittadella	Undisclosed
21 August 2019	(Switzerland) Nicky Beloko	Fiorentina	(Belgium) Gent	Loan
21 August 2019	(France) Franck Ribéry	(Germany) Bayern Munich	Fiorentina	Free
21 August 2019	Davide Zappacosta	(England) Chelsea	Roma	6-month loan
21 August 2019	Lorenzo Sarini	Chievo	Pianese	Loan
21 August 2019	(Hungary) András Schäfer	Genoa	Chievo	Loan
21 August 2019	Alberto Picchi	Empoli	Arezzo	Undisclosed
21 August 2019	Alessandro Piu	Empoli	Arezzo	Undisclosed
21 August 2019	Massimiliano Benucci	Empoli	Arezzo	Undisclosed
21 August 2019	Samuele Damiani	Empoli	Carrarese	Loan
21 August 2019	Jacopo Manconi	Perugia	Gubbio	Loan
21 August 2019	Mattia Felici	Lecce	Palermo	Loan
21 August 2019	Claud Adjapong	Sassuolo	Verona	Loan
21 August 2019	(Latvia) Reinis Reinholds	Pisa	(Cyprus) Pafos	Loan
21 August 2019	Niccolò Corrado	Inter	Arezzo	Loan
22 August 2019	Alberto Almici	Verona	Pordenone	Loan
22 August 2019	(Cyprus) Grigoris Kastanos	Juventus U23	Pescara	Loan
22 August 2019	(Sweden) Ken Sema	(England) Watford	Udinese	Loan
23 August 2019	(North Macedonia) Ognjen Stijepović	Sampdoria	Pistoiese	Loan
23 August 2019	Marcello Gazzola	Parma	Empoli	Loan
23 August 2019	(Argentina) Maxi López	(Brazil) Vasco da Gama	Crotone	Free
23 August 2019	Vincenzo Venditti	Ascoli	Fano	Undisclosed
23 August 2019	Francesco Bombagi	Pordenone	Teramo	Undisclosed
23 August 2019	(Mexico) Hirving Lozano	(Netherlands) PSV Eindhoven	Napoli	Undisclosed
23 August 2019	(Croatia) Stipe Perica	Udinese	(Belgium) Mouscron	Undisclosed
23 August 2019	(Poland) Patryk Dziczek	(Poland) Piast Gliwice	Lazio	Undisclosed
23 August 2019	Alberto Masi	Pisa	Pro Vercelli	Undisclosed
23 August 2019	Giuseppe Torromino	Juve Stabia	Ternana	Undisclosed
23 August 2019	Jacopo Segre	Torino	Chievo	Loan
23 August 2019	Luigi Alberto Scaglia	Parma	Trapani	Undisclosed
23 August 2019	Riccardo Forte	Milan	Piacenza	Loan
24 August 2019	Kingsley Boateng	Ternana	Juve Stabia	Loan
24 August 2019	(Serbia) Nenad Tomović	Chievo	S.P.A.L.	Loan
24 August 2019	(Finland) Sauli Väisänen	S.P.A.L.	Chievo	Undisclosed
24 August 2019	Pierluigi Cappelluzzo	Verona	Pistoiese	Loan
26 August 2019	Simone Calvano	Verona	Juve Stabia	Loan
26 August 2019	Arturo Calabresi	Bologna	(France) Amiens	Loan
26 August 2019	Fabrizio Poli	Carpi	Virtus Entella	Undisclosed
27 August 2019	Stefano Pettinari	Lecce	Trapani	Loan
27 August 2019	Matteo Pessina	Atalanta	Verona	Loan
27 August 2019	Giuseppe Pezzella	Udinese	Parma	Loan
27 August 2019	(Slovenia) Maj Rorič	Inter	(Slovakia) Sereď	Loan
27 August 2019	(Croatia) Ante Ćorić	Roma	(Spain) Almería	Loan
27 August 2019	(Portugal) João Mário	Inter	(Russia) Lokomotiv Moscow	Loan
27 August 2019	Marco Varnier	Atalanta	Pisa	Loan
28 August 2019	(Brazil) Guilherme Arana	(Spain) Atalanta	Atalanta	Loan
28 August 2019	(Uruguay) César Falletti	Bologna	(Mexico) Tijuana	Loan
28 August 2019	Giacomo Ricci	Parma	Juve Stabia	Loan
28 August 2019	(Spain) Jony Rodríguez	(Spain) Málaga	Lazio	Undisclosed
28 August 2019	(Poland) Patryk Dziczek	Lazio	Salernitana	Loan
28 August 2019	(Poland) Arkadiusz Reca	Atalanta	S.P.A.L.	Loan
28 August 2019	Franck Tsadjout	Milan	(Belgium) Charleroi	Loan
28 August 2019	Adriano Montalto	Cremonese	Venezia	Loan
29 August 2019	Cristiano Biraghi	Fiorentina	Inter	Loan
29 August 2019	(Brazil) Dalbert Henrique	Inter	Fiorentina	Loan
29 August 2019	(Austria) Arnel Jakupović	Empoli	(Slovenia) Domžale	Loan
29 August 2019	(Slovakia) Samuel Mráz	Empoli	(Denmark) Brøndby	Loan
29 August 2019	(Chile) Gary Medel	(Turkey) Beşiktaş	Bologna	Undisclosed
29 August 2019	(Chile) Alexis Sánchez	(England) Manchester United	Inter	Loan
29 August 2019	(Brazil) Ryder Matos	Udinese	(Switzerland) Luzern	Loan
29 August 2019	Luca Marrone	Verona	Crotone	Loan
29 August 2019	Dario Del Fabro	Juventus	(Scotland) Kilmarnock	Loan
29 August 2019	(Senegal) Yves Baraye	Parma	(Portugal) Gil Vicente	Loan
29 August 2019	Pierluigi Pinto	Fiorentina	Salernitana	Loan
30 August 2019	(Brazil) Matheus Pereira	Juventus	(France) Dijon	Loan
30 August 2019	(England) Stephy Mavididi	Juventus	(France) Dijon	Loan
30 August 2019	(South Korea) Lee Seung-woo	Verona	(Belgium) Sint-Truidense	Undisclosed
30 August 2019	(Algeria) Adam Ounas	Napoli	(France) Nice	Loan
30 August 2019	(Uruguay) Martín Cáceres	Lazio	Fiorentina	Free
30 August 2019	(Slovenia) Elian Demirovič	Inter	Chievo	Loan
30 August 2019	Giovanni Nuti	Chievo	(Spain) San Roque de Lepe	Loan
30 August 2019	(Croatia) Andrija Balić	Udinese	Perugia	Loan
30 August 2019	(Senegal) Mamadou Coulibaly	Udinese	Virtus Entella	Loan
30 August 2019	(Sweden) Svante Ingelsson	Udinese	Pescara	Loan
30 August 2019	Roberto Strechie	Venezia	(Romania) Dinamo București	Undisclosed
30 August 2019	(England) Chris Smalling	(England) Manchester United	Roma	Loan
30 August 2019	(France) Gregoire Defrel	Roma	Sassuolo	Loan
30 August 2019	(Sweden) Robin Olsen	Roma	Cagliari	Loan
30 August 2019	(Argentina) Giovanni Simeone	Fiorentina	Cagliari	Loan
30 August 2019	(Republic of Ireland) Ryan Nolan	Inter	Arezzo	Undisclosed
30 August 2019	Andrea Saraniti	Lecce	Vicenza	Loan
30 August 2019	(Serbia) Bogdan Jočić	(Serbia) Red Star Belgrade	Verona	Undisclosed
31 August 2019	(Uruguay) Diego Laxalt	Milan	Torino	Loan
31 August 2019	(Equatorial Guinea) José Machín	Parma	Pescara	Loan
31 August 2019	(Argentina) Santiago Colombatto	Cagliari	(Belgium) Sint-Truidense	Undisclosed
31 August 2019	(Democratic Republic of the Congo) Giannelli Imbula	(England) Stoke City	Lecce	Loan
31 August 2019	Luca Valzania	Atalanta	Cremonese	Loan
31 August 2019	Francesco Cosenza	Lecce	Alessandria	Undisclosed
31 August 2019	Leandro Greco	Foggia	Cosenza	Free

=== September ===
Date	Name	Moving from	Moving to	Fee
1 September 2019	(Sweden) Oscar Hiljemark	Genoa	(Russia) Dynamo Moscow	Undisclosed
1 September 2019	Antonino Ragusa	Verona	Spezia	Loan
1 September 2019	(Japan) Cy Goddard	Benevento	(Cyprus) Pafos	Loan
2 September 2019	(Romania) Vlad Chiricheș	Napoli	Sassuolo	Loan
2 September 2019	(Spain) Fernando Llorente	(England) Tottenham	Napoli	Free
2 September 2019	Matteo Darmian	(England) Manchester United	Parma	Undisclosed
2 September 2019	(Nigeria) Kingsley Michael	Bologna	Cremonese	Loan
2 September 2019	Massimiliano Pesenti	Pisa	Padova	Undisclosed
2 September 2019	Andrea Seculin	Chievo	Sampdoria	Loan
2 September 2019	Antonio Di Nardo	Sampdoria	Vis Pesaro	Loan
2 September 2019	(Slovakia) Martin Škrtel	Atalanta	Unattached	Released
2 September 2019	(Denmark) Simon Kjær	(Spain) Sevilla	Atalanta	Loan
2 September 2019	(Croatia) Filip Bradarić	Cagliari	(Croatia) Hajduk	Loan
2 September 2019	(Portugal) André Silva	Milan	(Germany) Eintracht Frankfurt	2-year loan
2 September 2019	(Croatia) Ante Rebić	(Germany) Eintracht Frankfurt	Milan	2-year loan
2 September 2019	(Ghana) Abdallah Basit	Arezzo	Benevento	Undisclosed
2 September 2019	(Finland) Përparim Hetemaj	Chievo	Benevento	Undisclosed
2 September 2019	Riccardo Baroni	Fiorentina	Robur Siena	Loan
2 September 2019	Gabriele Gori	Fiorentina	Arezzo	Loan
2 September 2019	Lorenzo Simonetti	Parma	Carpi	Loan
2 September 2019	Fabio Ceravolo	Parma	Cremonese	Undisclosed
2 September 2019	(Croatia) Josip Maganjić	Fiorentina	(Croatia) Istra	Loan
2 September 2019	(Netherlands) Kevin Diks	Fiorentina	(Denmark) Aarhus	Loan
2 September 2019	(Brazil) Pedro	(Brazil) Fluminense	Fiorentina	Undisclosed
2 September 2019	(England) Bobby Duncan	(England) Liverpool	Fiorentina	Undisclosed
2 September 2019	(Argentina) Mauro Icardi	Inter	(France) Paris Saint-Germain	Loan
2 September 2019	(Sweden) Samuel Gustafson	Torino	Cremonese	Undisclosed
2 September 2019	(Kosovo) Samir Ujkani	(Turkey) Çaykur Rizespor	Torino	Undisclosed
2 September 2019	Simone Verdi	Napoli	Torino	Loan
2 September 2019	Alessandro Matri	Sassuolo	Brescia	Loan
2 September 2019	(Ghana) Bismark Ngissah	Chievo	Imolese	Loan
2 September 2019	Lorenzo Dickmann	S.P.A.L.	Chievo	Loan
2 September 2019	Michele Nardi	Parma	Chievo	Undisclosed
2 September 2019	(Poland) Mariusz Stępiński	Chievo	Verona	Loan
2 September 2019	Michael Fabbro	Chievo	Pisa	Loan
2 September 2019	Stefano Okaka	(England) Watford	Udinese	Undisclosed
2 September 2019	(Brazil) Wallace	Lazio	(Portugal) Braga	Loan
2 September 2019	(Ivory Coast) Cedric Gondo	Rieti	Lazio	Undisclosed
2 September 2019	(Ivory Coast) Cedric Gondo	Lazio	Salernitana	Loan
2 September 2019	(Portugal) Madiu Bari	Lazio	(Austria) Dornbirn	Loan
2 September 2019	(Guadeloupe) Andreaw Gravillon	Sassuolo	Ascoli	Loan
2 September 2019	(Senegal) Khouma Babacar	Sassuolo	Lecce	Loan
2 September 2019	Enrico Brignola	Sassuolo	Livorno	Loan
2 September 2019	Edoardo Goldaniga	Sassuolo	Genoa	Loan
2 September 2019	Filippo Romagna	Cagliari	Sassuolo	Loan
2 September 2019	(Greece) Giorgios Kyriakopoulos	(Greece) Asteras Tripolis	Sassuolo	Loan
2 September 2019	Alessandro Matri	Sassuolo	Brescia	Loan
2 September 2019	(United States) Andrija Novakovich	(England) Reading	Frosinone	Undisclosed
2 September 2019	Vincenzo Tommasone	Inter	Carpi	Loan
2 September 2019	(Honduras) Rigoberto Rivas	Inter	Reggina	Loan
2 September 2019	(Brazil) Wesley	Unattached	Verona	Free
2 September 2019	Federico Viviani	S.P.A.L.	Livorno	Loan
2 September 2019	Jacopo Sala	Sampdoria	S.P.A.L.	Undisclosed
2 September 2019	(Bulgaria) Kiril Despodov	Cagliari	(Austria) Sturm Graz	Loan
2 September 2019	(North Korea) Han Kwang-song	Cagliari	Juventus	Undisclosed
2 September 2019	(Denmark) Peter Ankersen	(Denmark) Copenhagen	Genoa	Undisclosed
2 September 2019	(Brazil) Rômulo	Genoa	Brescia	Loan
2 September 2019	Nicholas Rizzo	Genoa	Carrarese	Loan
2 September 2019	(Algeria) Rachid Ghezzal	(England) Leicester	Fiorentina	Loan
2 September 2019	Francesco Forte	(Belgium) Waasland-Beveren	Juve Stabia	Loan
2 September 2019	Alfredo Bifulco	Napoli	Juve Stabia	Loan
2 September 2019	(Brazil) Miguel Alcantara	(Brazil) Santos	Ascoli	Undisclosed
2 September 2019	Simone Padoin	Cagliari	Ascoli	Free
2 September 2019	Nicola Leali	Perugia	Ascoli	2-year loan
2 September 2019	Andrea Fulignati	Ascoli	Perugia	Undisclosed
2 September 2019	Marco Moscati	Perugia	Trapani	Loan
2 September 2019	Andrea Bianchimano	Perugia	Catanzaro	Loan
2 September 2019	Diego Falcinelli	Bologna	Perugia	Loan
2 September 2019	Hans Nicolussi	Juventus	Perugia	Loan
2 September 2019	(France) Maxime Gonalons	Roma	(Spain) Granada	Loan
2 September 2019	(Czech Republic) Patrik Schick	Roma	(Germany) RB Leipzig	Loan
2 September 2019	(Croatia) Nikola Kalinić	(Spain) Atlético Madrid	Roma	Loan
2 September 2019	(Armenia) Henrikh Mkhitaryan	(England) Arsenal	Roma	Loan
2 September 2019	(France) Zinédine Machach	Napoli	Cosenza	Loan
2 September 2019	(Morocco) Achraf Lazaar	(England) Newcastle	Cosenza	Loan
2 September 2019	Riccardo Moreo	Cosenza	Monopoli	Loan
2 September 2019	Romano Perticone	Salernitana	Cittadella	Undisclosed
2 September 2019	Mirko Drudi	Cittadella	Pescara	Loan
2 September 2019	Christian Ventola	Pescara	Cittadella	Loan
2 September 2019	Edoardo Soldati	Venezia	Picerno	Loan
2 September 2019	(Scotland) Harvey St Clair	Venezia	(Scotland) Kilmarnock	Loan
2 September 2019	(Nigeria) Theophilus Awua	Spezia	Bari	Loan
2 September 2019	Raffaele Bianco	Perugia	Bari	Free
2 September 2019	(Argentina) Emiliano Rigoni	(Russia) Zenit	Sampdoria	Loan
2 September 2019	(Brazil) Kaique Rocha	(Brazil) Santos	Sampdoria	Loan
2 September 2019	Leonardo Capezzi	Sampdoria	(Spain) Albacete	Undisclosed
2 September 2019	Luca Rigoni	Parma	Vicenza	Undisclosed
2 September 2019	Manuel Marras	Pescara	Livorno	Undisclosed
2 September 2019	(Netherlands) Sven Braken	(Netherlands) N.E.C.	Livorno	Free
2 September 2019	(Sierra Leone) Augustus Kargbo	Crotone	Reggio Audace	Loan
2 September 2019	(Serbia) Luka Marković	Crotone	Torino	Loan
2 September 2019	(Poland) Przemysław Bargiel	Milan	(Poland) Śląsk Wrocław	Undisclosed
2 September 2019	(Serbia) Petar Mićin	Udinese	(Serbia) Čukarički	Loan
2 September 2019	(Croatia) Alen Halilović	Milan	(Netherlands) Heerenveen	Loan
2 September 2019	(France) Thomas Heurtaux	Unattached	Salernitana	Free
2 September 2019	Daniele Altobelli	Salernitana	Feralpisalò	Loan
2 September 2019	Danilo Quaranta	Ascoli	Catanzaro	Loan
3 September 2019	(Mali) Aly Mallé	Udinese	(Turkey) Balıkesirspor	Loan
5 September 2019	Matteo Ricci	Unattached	Livorno	Free
7 September 2019	Alessandro Livieri	Unattached	Pisa	Free
