= List of Italian football transfers winter 2019–20 =

The 2019–20 winter transfer window for Italian football transfers opened on 2 January and closed on 31 January 2020. Additionally, players without a club could join at any time. This list includes transfers featuring at least one Serie A or Serie B club which were completed after the end of the summer 2019 transfer window and before the end of the 2019–20 winter window.

== Transfers ==
Legend

- Those clubs in Italic indicate that the player already left the team on loan on this or the previous season or new signing that immediately left the club.

=== September-December 2019 ===
Date	Name	Moving from	Moving to	Fee
8 October 2019	Andrea Bertolacci	Unattached	Sampdoria	Free
3 November 2019	(Liechtenstein) Marcel Büchel	Unattached	Juve Stabia	Free
4 December 2019	(Brazil) Everton Luiz	S.P.A.L.	(United States) Real Salt Lake	Undisclosed (Note: The player already played for his new club in the first part of the season, the deal turned from temporary to definitive.)
6 December 2019 (Note: Effective on 1 January 2020)	(Denmark) Riza Durmisi	Lazio	(France) Nice	Loan
16 December 2019	Giulio Donati	Unattached	Lecce	Free
17 December 2019	(Brazil) Ewandro	Udinese	(Brazil) SC Recife	Loan
23 December 2019	(Colombia) Juan Manuel Valencia	Bologna	Reggiana	Loan
24 December 2019	(Croatia) Mario Mandžukić	Juventus	(Qatar) Al-Duhail	Undisclosed
26 December 2019	(Brazil) Gilberto	Fiorentina	(Brazil) Fluminense	Undisclosed
27 December 2019	(Sweden) Zlatan Ibrahimović	(United States) LA Galaxy	Milan	Free

=== January 2020 ===
Date	Name	Moving from	Moving to	Fee
2 January 2020	Mattia Perin	Juventus	Genoa	Loan
2 January 2020	(Sweden) Dejan Kulusevski	Atalanta	Juventus	€35+9M
2 January 2020	(Sweden) Dejan Kulusevski	Juventus	Parma	Loan
3 January 2020	(Switzerland) Valon Behrami	Unattached	Genoa	Free
3 January 2020	Nicola Rauti	Torino	Monza	Loan
4 January 2020	Mattia Destro	Bologna	Genoa	Loan
4 January 2020	Roberto Pierno	Lecce	Bitonto	Loan
4 January 2020	Simone Aresti	Cagliari	Olbia	Undisclosed
4 January 2020	(Brazil) Felipe Vizeu	Udinese	(Brazil) Athletico Paranaense	Loan
7 January 2020	Gabriele Moncini	S.P.A.L.	Benevento	Undisclosed
7 January 2020	Gianluca Litteri	Cosenza	Padova	Loan
7 January 2020	(Croatia) Luka Dumančić	Lecce	Gozzano	Loan
8 January 2020	(North Korea) Han Kwang-song	Juventus	(Qatar) Al-Duhail	Undisclosed
8 January 2020	Michele Cerofolini	Fiorentina	Casertana	Loan
8 January 2020	(Ghana) Shaka Mawuli	S.P.A.L.	Ravenna	Loan
8 January 2020	(Germany) Diego Demme	(Germany) RB Leipzig	Napoli	Undisclosed
8 January 2020	Nicolò De Angelis	Torino	Gozzano	Undisclosed
9 January 2020	Fabio Eguelfi	Atalanta	Feralpisalò	Loan
9 January 2020	Simone Pinna	Cagliari	Empoli	Loan
9 January 2020	Amato Ciciretti	Napoli	Empoli	Loan
9 January 2020	(Germany) Maurice Čović	(Germany) Hertha Berlin	Ascoli	Loan
9 January 2020	(Sweden) Jonathan Liljedahl	(Sweden) Örgryte	Perugia	Free
10 January 2020	(Slovenia) Jasmin Kurtić	S.P.A.L.	Parma	Loan
10 January 2020	Cristian Bunino	Pescara	Viterbese	Loan
10 January 2020	Riccardo Fiamozzi	Lecce	Empoli	18-month loan
10 January 2020	Patrick Cutrone	(England) Wolverhampton	Fiorentina	Loan
10 January 2020	Gennaro Tutino	Napoli	Empoli	Loan
10 January 2020	Alessandro Deiola	Cagliari	Lecce	Loan
11 January 2020	Alessandro Buongiorno	Torino	Trapani	Loan
11 January 2020	Andrea La Mantia	Lecce	Empoli	Loan
11 January 2020	(Chile) Francisco Sierralta	Udinese	Empoli	Loan
11 January 2020	(Uruguay) Sebastián Cristóforo	Fiorentina	(Spain) Eibar	Loan
12 January 2020	Mattia Caldara	Milan	Atalanta	18-month loan
13 January 2020	(Burkina Faso) Bryan Dabo	Fiorentina	S.P.A.L.	Loan
13 January 2020	(France) Hervin Ongenda	(Romania) Botoșani	Chievo	Undisclosed
13 January 2020	Luca Vido	Atalanta	Pisa	Loan
13 January 2020	(France) M'Bala Nzola	Trapani	Spezia	Loan
13 January 2020	(Senegal) Mamadou Coulibaly	Udinese	Trapani	Loan
13 January 2020	(Portugal) Diogo Pinto	(Portugal) Benfica B	Ascoli	Undisclosed
13 January 2020	(Denmark) Simon Kjær	(Spain) Sevilla	Milan	Loan
13 January 2020	(Bosnia and Herzegovina) Asmir Begović	(England) Bournemouth	Milan	Loan
13 January 2020	(Spain) Pepe Reina	Milan	(England) Aston Villa	Loan
13 January 2020	(Denmark) Jacob Rasmussen	Fiorentina	(Germany) Erzgebirge Aue	Loan
14 January 2020	Fabio Borini	Milan	Verona	Undisclosed
14 January 2020	Salvatore D'Elia	Ascoli	Frosinone	Undisclosed
14 January 2020	(Finland) Simon Skrabb	(Sweden) Norrköping	Brescia	Undisclosed
14 January 2020	(Argentina) Ignacio Pussetto	Udinese	(England) Watford	Undisclosed
14 January 2020	Alessandro Celli	Pescara	Rieti	Loan
15 January 2020	(Colombia) Jeison Murillo	Sampdoria	(Spain) Celta	Loan
15 January 2020	(Slovakia) Stanislav Lobotka	(Spain) Celta	Napoli	Undisclosed
15 January 2020	Lorenzo Gavioli	Inter	Ravenna	Loan
15 January 2020	Cristian Molinaro	Unattached	Venezia	Free
15 January 2020	Gaetano Monachello	Atalanta	Venezia	Loan
15 January 2020	Riccardo Bocalon	Venezia	Pordenone	Loan
15 January 2020	Davide Di Quinzio	Pisa	Alessandria	Undisclosed
15 January 2020	Luca Mazzitelli	Sassuolo	Virtus Entella	Loan
15 January 2020	Francesco Stanco	Feralpisalò	Cittadella	Undisclosed
15 January 2020	Davide Vitturini	Pescara	Feralpisalò	Undisclosed
15 January 2020	Andrea Tabanelli	Lecce	Frosinone	Undisclosed
16 January 2020	Cristian Cauz	Parma	Ravenna	Loan
16 January 2020	Leonardo Morosini	Brescia	Ascoli	Loan
16 January 2020	Alessandro Eleuteri	Atalanta	Alessandria	Loan
16 January 2020	Danilo Soddimo	Cremonese	Pisa	Undisclosed
16 January 2020	Jacopo Manconi	Perugia	Giana	Loan
17 January 2020	(Belgium) Stéphane Oméonga	Genoa	(Scotland) Hibernian	Loan
17 January 2020	(Hungary) András Schäfer	Genoa	(Slovakia) Dunajská Streda	Loan
17 January 2020	(The Gambia) Musa Barrow	Atalanta	Bologna	Loan
17 January 2020	(Scotland) Liam Henderson	Verona	Empoli	Loan
17 January 2020	Francesco Ardizzone	Virtus Entella	Cesena	Undisclosed
17 January 2020	(Colombia) Duván Zapata	Sampdoria	Atalanta	Undisclosed
17 January 2020	Andrea Marino	Salernitana	Lazio	Undisclosed
17 January 2020	Leonardo Benedetti	Sampdoria	Vis Pesaro	Loan
18 January 2020	(England) Ashley Young	(England) Manchester United	Inter	Undisclosed
18 January 2020	(Slovakia) Ľubomír Tupta	Verona	(Poland) Wisła Kraków	Loan
18 January 2020	(Iceland) Birkir Bjarnason	Unattached	Brescia	Free
18 January 2020	Alessandro Livieri	Pisa	Lecco	Loan
20 January 2020	(Kosovo) Amir Rrahmani	Verona	Napoli	Undisclosed
20 January 2020	(Kosovo) Amir Rrahmani	Napoli	Verona	Loan
20 January 2020	(Turkey) Sinan Gümüş	Genoa	(Turkey) Antalyaspor	Loan
20 January 2020	(Romania) Romario Benzar	Lecce	Perugia	Loan
20 January 2020	Emanuel Vignato	Chievo	Bologna	Undisclosed
20 January 2020	Emanuel Vignato	Bologna	Chievo	Loan
21 January 2020	(Tunisia) Karim Laribi	Verona	Bari	Loan
21 January 2020	Nicholas Izzillo	Pisa	Avellino	Loan
21 January 2020	Ramzi Aya	Pisa	Salernitana	Loan
21 January 2020	Gabriel Meli	Empoli	Rimini	Loan
21 January 2020	Ivan De Santis	Virtus Entella	Cesena	Loan
21 January 2020	Giuseppe Barone	(United States) New York Cosmos	Perugia	Undisclosed
21 January 2020	Gianluca Gaetano	Napoli	Cremonese	Loan
21 January 2020	Andrea Cisco	Sassuolo	Novara	18-month loan
21 January 2020	Elia Caprile	Chievo	(England) Leeds United	Undisclosed
21 January 2020	(France) Jeremy Petris	Crotone	Bisceglie	Loan
22 January 2020	(Serbia) Vladan Đekić	Inter	Pisa	Undisclosed
22 January 2020	(Germany) Lennart Czyborra	(Netherlands) Heracles	Atalanta	Undisclosed
22 January 2020	Riccardo Saponara	Genoa	Lecce	Loan
22 January 2020	Ivan Provedel	Empoli	Juve Stabia	Loan
22 January 2020	Paolo Branduani	Juve Stabia	Empoli	Undisclosed
23 January 2020	(Nigeria) Victor Moses	(England) Chelsea	Inter	Loan
23 January 2020	(Ghana) Moses Odjer	Salernitana	Trapani	Undisclosed
23 January 2020	(Brazil) Felipe Curcio	Brescia	Salernitana	Free
23 January 2020	Filippo De Col	Unattached	Virtus Entella	Free
23 January 2020	Eros Pisano	Unattached	Pisa	Free
23 January 2020	Salvatore Caturano	Virtus Entella	Cesena	Loan
23 January 2020	Lorenzo Tonelli	Napoli	Sampdoria	Loan
23 January 2020	(Brazil) Pedro	Fiorentina	(Brazil) Flamengo	Loan
23 January 2020	(Sweden) Svante Ingelsson	Udinese	(Sweden) Kalmar	Loan
23 January 2020	(Sweden) Sebastian Eriksson	(Sweden) Göteborg	Genoa	Undisclosed
24 January 2020	(Austria) Valentino Lazaro	Inter	(England) Newcastle	Loan
24 January 2020	(Nigeria) Orji Okwonkwo	Bologna	(United States) Montreal Impact	Loan
24 January 2020	Daniel Bessa	Verona	(Brazil) Goiás	Loan
24 January 2020	Kevin Bonifazi	Torino	S.P.A.L.	Loan
24 January 2020	(Netherlands) Marvin Zeegelaar	(England) Watford	Udinese	Undisclosed
24 January 2020	Matteo Brunori Sandri	Parma	Pescara	Undisclosed
24 January 2020	Matteo Brunori Sandri	Pescara	Juventus	Undisclosed
24 January 2020	Edoardo Masciangelo	Juventus	Pescara	Undisclosed
24 January 2020	(Poland) Tomasz Kupisz	Bari	Trapani	Loan
24 January 2020	Andrea Zaccagno	Torino	Virtus Entella	Loan
24 January 2020	Federico Barba	Chievo	Benevento	Loan
24 January 2020	Andrea Dini	Parma	Avellino	Loan
24 January 2020	Francesco Golfo	Parma	Potenza	Loan
24 January 2020	(Croatia) Filip Bradarić	Cagliari	(Spain) Celta	Loan
25 January 2020	(Brazil) Matheus Pereira	Juventus	(Spain) Barcelona B	Loan
25 January 2020	(Spain) Alejandro Marqués	(Spain) Barcelona B	Juventus	Undisclosed
25 January 2020	(Bulgaria) Radoslav Tsonev	Lecce	Monopoli	Loan
25 January 2020	Marco Bleve	Lecce	Catanzaro	Loan
25 January 2020	(Serbia) Strahinja Tanasijević	Chievo	(Serbia) Rad	Loan
27 January 2020	Antonio Caracciolo	Cremonese	Pisa	Undisclosed
27 January 2020	(Brazil) Roger Ibañez	Atalanta	Roma	18-month loan
27 January 2020	(Brazil) Gabriel Barbosa	Inter	(Brazil) Flamengo	Undisclosed
27 January 2020	Massimo Bertagnoli	Chievo	Fermana	Loan
27 January 2020	(Serbia) Slobodan Rajković	Unattached	Perugia	Free
27 January 2020	Matteo Ardemagni	Ascoli	Frosinone	Undisclosed
27 January 2020	Marcello Trotta	Frosinone	Ascoli	Loan
28 January 2020	(Denmark) Christian Eriksen	(England) Tottenham	Inter	Undisclosed
28 January 2020	Alessandro Crescenzi	Verona	Cremonese	Loan
28 January 2020	Matteo Politano	Inter	Napoli	18-month loan
28 January 2020	(Ghana) Nicholas Opoku	Udinese	(France) Amiens	18-month loan
28 January 2020	Davide Riccardi	Lecce	Venezia	Loan
28 January 2020	(Norway) Kristoffer Askildsen	(Norway) Stabæk	Sampdoria	Loan
28 January 2020	Francesco Renzetti	Cremonese	Chievo	Undisclosed
28 January 2020	(Montenegro) Filip Raičević	Livorno	(Poland) Śląsk Wrocław	Loan
29 January 2020	(Czech Republic) Antonín Barák	Udinese	Lecce	Loan
29 January 2020	(Uruguay) Edgar Elizalde	Catanzaro	Pescara	Loan return
29 January 2020	Matteo Ciofani	Pescara	Bari	Undisclosed
29 January 2020	Francesco Di Mariano	Venezia	Juve Stabia	Loan
29 January 2020	Marco Badan	Verona	Cavese	Loan
29 January 2020	Roberto Pirrello	Empoli	Trapani	Loan
29 January 2020	Andrea Masiello	Atalanta	Genoa	Undisclosed
29 January 2020	Leonardo Sernicola	Sassuolo	Ascoli	Loan
29 January 2020	(Belgium) Moutir Chajia	Ascoli	Virtus Entella	Loan
29 January 2020	(Netherlands) Alessio Da Cruz	Parma	(England) Sheffield Wednesday	Loan
29 January 2020	(Spain) Suso	Milan	(Spain) Sevilla	18-month loan
29 January 2020	(Canada) Sebastian Breza	Potenza	Bologna	Loan
29 January 2020	(Sweden) Jonathan Morsay	(Sweden) GIF Sundsvall	Chievo	Undisclosed
29 January 2020	(Morocco) Jawad El Yamiq	Genoa	(Spain) Real Zaragoza	Loan
30 January 2020	(Poland) Krzysztof Piątek	Milan	(Germany) Hertha Berlin	Undisclosed
30 January 2020	(Switzerland) Ricardo Rodríguez	Milan	(Netherlands) PSV Eindhoven	Loan
30 January 2020	(Spain) Carles Pérez	(Spain) Barcelona	Roma	Loan
30 January 2020	(Spain) Gonzalo Villar	(Spain) Elche	Roma	€4+1M
30 January 2020	Alessandro Florenzi	Roma	(Spain) Valencia	Loan
30 January 2020	Leonardo Capezzi	Sampdoria	Salernitana	Loan
30 January 2020	Fabrizio Alastra	Parma	Pescara	Loan
30 January 2020	(Romania) Ionuț Radu	Inter	Parma	Loan
30 January 2020	(Argentina) Tiago Casasola	Lazio	Cosenza	Loan
30 January 2020	(Kosovo) Valon Berisha	Lazio	(Germany) Fortuna Düsseldorf	Loan
30 January 2020	(Brazil) Wesley	Verona	Juventus	Loan
30 January 2020	Matteo Stoppa	Juventus	Sampdoria	Loan
30 January 2020	Nicolò Francoforte	Juventus	Sampdoria	Loan
30 January 2020	Erik Gerbi	Juventus	Sampdoria	Loan
30 January 2020	(Albania) Giacomo Vrioni	Sampdoria	Juventus	Undisclosed
30 January 2020	(Sweden) Samuel Armenteros	Benevento	Crotone	Loan
30 January 2020	(Slovenia) Žan Celar	Roma	Cremonese	Loan
30 January 2020	(Argentina) Franco Ferrari	Napoli	Livorno	Loan
30 January 2020	(Nigeria) Theophilus Awua	Spezia	Livorno	Loan
30 January 2020	Mario Prezioso	Napoli	Cosenza	Loan
30 January 2020	Ivan Lanni	Ascoli	Novara	Undisclosed
30 January 2020	Gabriele Marchegiani	Novara	Ascoli	Loan
30 January 2020	Luigi D'Ignazio	Napoli	Carrarese	Loan
31 January 2020	(Brazil) Igor Julio	S.P.A.L.	Fiorentina	18-month loan
31 January 2020	(Ghana) Alfred Duncan	Sassuolo	Fiorentina	Loan
31 January 2020	Luca Ranieri	Fiorentina	Ascoli	Loan
31 January 2020	(Spain) Iago Falque	Torino	Genoa	Loan
31 January 2020	Marco Pompetti	Inter	Pisa	Loan
31 January 2020	(Uruguay) Martin Satriano	(Uruguay) Club Nacional	Inter	Undisclosed
31 January 2020	Federico Dimarco	Inter	Verona	Loan
31 January 2020	(Switzerland) Blerim Džemaili	Bologna	(China) Shenzhen	Loan
31 January 2020	Ludovico Ricci	Viterbese	Lazio	Loan
31 January 2020	(Colombia) Kevin Agudelo	Genoa	Fiorentina	Loan
31 January 2020	(Ivory Coast) Christian Kouamé	Genoa	Fiorentina	Loan
31 January 2020	(Morocco) Sofyan Amrabat	(Belgium) Club Brugge	Verona	Undisclosed
31 January 2020	(Morocco) Sofyan Amrabat	Verona	Fiorentina	Undisclosed
31 January 2020	(Morocco) Sofyan Amrabat	Fiorentina	Verona	Loan
31 January 2020	(Japan) Maya Yoshida	(England) Southampton	Sampdoria	Loan
31 January 2020	Antonino La Gumina	Empoli	Sampdoria	18-month loan
31 January 2020	Carlo Romei	Sampdoria	Siena	Loan
31 January 2020	(France) Mohamed Bahlouli	Sampdoria	Cosenza	Loan
31 January 2020	(Argentina) Nehuén Paz	Bologna	Lecce	Loan
31 January 2020	(France) Valentin Eysseric	Fiorentina	Verona	Loan
31 January 2020	Matteo Lovato	Padova	Verona	Loan
31 January 2020	Antonio Di Gaudio	Verona	Spezia	Loan
31 January 2020	Luigi Vitale	Verona	Spezia	Loan
31 January 2020	Giangiacomo Magnani	Brescia	Sassuolo	Loan return
31 January 2020	(Slovakia) Lukáš Haraslín	(Poland) Lechia Gdańsk	Sassuolo	Loan
31 January 2020	(Uruguay) Emiliano Gómez	(Uruguay) Boston River	Sassuolo	Loan
31 January 2020	(Uruguay) Diego Laxalt	Torino	Milan	Loan return
31 January 2020	(Equatorial Guinea) José Machín	Parma	Monza	Loan
31 January 2020	Jacopo Dezi	Parma	Virtus Entella	Loan
31 January 2020	Gianluca Caprari	Sampdoria	Parma	Loan
31 January 2020	Vasco Regini	Sampdoria	Parma	Loan
31 January 2020	Simone Lo Faso	Lecce	Cesena	Loan
31 January 2020	(Croatia) Marko Pjaca	Juventus	(Belgium) Anderlecht	Loan
31 January 2020	(Germany) Emre Can	Juventus	(Germany) Borussia Dortmund	Loan
31 January 2020	(France) Adrien Tameze	(France) Nice	Atalanta	Loan
31 January 2020	(Croatia) Boško Šutalo	(Croatia) Osijek	Atalanta	Loan
31 January 2020	Raoul Bellanova	(France) Bordeaux	Atalanta	Loan
31 January 2020	Manuel Pucciarelli	Chievo	Pescara	Loan
31 January 2020	(Belgium) Alexis Saelemaekers	(Belgium) Anderlecht	Milan	Loan
31 January 2020	(France) Adama Soumaoro	(France) Lille	Genoa	Loan
31 January 2020	Vittorio Parigini	Torino	Genoa	Undisclosed
31 January 2020	Vittorio Parigini	Genoa	Cremonese	Loan
31 January 2020	(France) Steven Nzonzi	Roma	(France) Rennes	Loan
31 January 2020	Alberto Paloschi	S.P.A.L.	Cagliari	Loan
31 January 2020	Alberto Cerri	Cagliari	S.P.A.L.	Loan
31 January 2020	(Argentina) Lucas Castro	Cagliari	S.P.A.L.	Loan
31 January 2020	(Montenegro) Marko Janković	S.P.A.L.	Crotone	Loan
31 January 2020	(Bosnia and Herzegovina) Ervin Zukanović	Unattached	S.P.A.L.	Free
31 January 2020	Andrea Petagna	S.P.A.L.	Napoli	Undisclosed
31 January 2020	Andrea Petagna	Napoli	S.P.A.L.	Loan
31 January 2020	(England) DJ Buffonge	Spezia	Pergolettese	Undisclosed
31 January 2020	(Netherlands) Delano Burgzorg	Spezia	(Netherlands) Heracles Almelo	Loan
31 January 2020	Simone Barone	Spezia	Rimini	Loan
31 January 2020	Luca Tremolada	Brescia	Pordenone	Free
31 January 2020	Andrea Gasbarro	Livorno	Pordenone	Loan
31 January 2020	Leandro Greco	Cosenza	Perugia	Undisclosed
31 January 2020	Andrea Nalini	Crotone	Vicenza	Undisclosed
31 January 2020	Alberto Gerbo	Ascoli	Crotone	Loan
31 January 2020	Davide Masella	Pescara	Benevento	Undisclosed
31 January 2020	Davide Masella	Benevento	Pescara	Loan
31 January 2020	Igor Lucatelli	Pescara	Benevento	Undisclosed
31 January 2020	Igor Lucatelli	Benevento	Pescara	Loan
31 January 2020	(Spain) Alejandro Rodríguez	Chievo	Virtus Entella	18-month loan
31 January 2020	Emanuele Polverino	Sicula Leonzio	Juve Stabia	Undisclosed
31 January 2020	Roberto Ogunseye	Olbia	Cittadella	Undisclosed
31 January 2020	Roberto Ogunseye	Cittadella	Olbia	Loan
31 January 2020	(Poland) Filip Piszczek	(Poland) Cracovia	Trapani	Loan
31 January 2020	Mattia Trovato	Fiorentina	Livorno	Loan
31 January 2020	(Senegal) Moustapha Seck	Roma	Livorno	Loan
31 January 2020	(Uruguay) Gastón Pereiro	(Netherlands) PSV Eindhoven	Cagliari	Undisclosed
31 January 2020	Luca Crosta	Cagliari	Renate	Loan
31 January 2020	Federico Valietti	Genoa	Carrarese	Loan
31 January 2020	Antonio Candela	Genoa	Olbia	Loan
31 January 2020	Marco Firenze	Salernitana	Venezia	Loan
31 January 2020	Emanuele Cicerelli	Salernitana	Lazio	Undisclosed
31 January 2020	Emanuele Cicerelli	Lazio	Salernitana	Loan
31 January 2020	Mattia Novella	Salernitana	Lazio	Undisclosed
31 January 2020	Biagio Morrone	Salernitana	Lazio	Undisclosed
31 January 2020	Sedrick Kalombo	Salernitana	Rieti	Loan
31 January 2020	Pierluigi Pinto	Fiorentina	Bari	Loan
31 January 2020	(Spain) Tòfol Montiel	Fiorentina	(Portugal) Vitória de Setúbal	Loan
31 January 2020	Davide Brivio	Chievo	Triestina	Undisclosed
31 January 2020	Lorenzo Laverone	Ascoli	Triestina	Loan
31 January 2020	Eric Lanini	Parma	Como	Loan

=== February 2020 ===
Date	Name	Moving from	Moving to	Fee
1 February 2020	(Argentina) Emiliano Rigoni	Sampdoria	(Russia) Zenit	Loan return
4 February 2020	(Austria) Sebastian Prödl	Unattached	Udinese	Free
4 February 2020	(Sweden) Viktor Agardius	Unattached	Livorno	Free
6 February 2020	(Croatia) Lorenco Šimić	Sampdoria	(Slovakia) Dunajská Streda	Loan
6 February 2020	(Argentina) Matías Silvestre	Unattached	Livorno	Free
6 February 2020	(Croatia) Ivan Vargić	Lazio	(Slovenia) Koper	Loan
12 February 2020	(Sweden) Robin Simović	Unattached	Livorno	Free
13 February 2020	(Bulgaria) Valeri Bojinov	Unattached	Pescara	Free
13 February 2020	(Brazil) Jandrei	Genoa	Athletico-PR	18-month loan
14 February 2020	(Croatia) Andrija Balić	Udinese	(Slovakia) Dunajská Streda	Loan
14 February 2020	(Uruguay) Salvador Ichazo	Unattached	Genoa	Free
17 February 2020	(Croatia) Matej Rodin	Perugia	(Croatia) Varaždin	Undisclosed
21 February 2020	(Democratic Republic of the Congo) Giannelli Imbula	Lecce	(England) Stoke City	Loan return
23 February 2020	(Guinea) Baïssama Sankoh	Unattached	Ascoli	Free
26 February 2020	Daniele Lazzari	Unattached	Salernitana	Free
26 February 2020	(Ivory Coast) Muhamed Tehe Olawale	Parma	(Finland) TPS	Loan
28 February 2020	(Cameroon) Joseph Minala	Lazio	(China) Qingdao Huanghai	Loan
