= Davide Seminara =

Italian footballer (born 1998)

Personal information
- Date of birth: 5 July 1998 (age 28)
- Place of birth: Livorno, Italy
- Height: 1.82 m (6 ft 0 in)
- Position: Left-back

Youth career
- –2017: Empoli

Senior career*
Years	Team	Apps	(Gls)
2016–2019	Empoli	0	(0)
2017–2018	→ Prato (loan)	20	(1)
2018–2019	→ Reggina (loan)	8	(0)
2019–2020	Pianese	24	(0)
2020–2021	Matelica	1	(0)
2021	Pianese	14	(0)
2021–2022	Pro Livorno Sorgenti	8	(1)
2022–2024	GSD Ghiviborgo VDS	30	(0)
- * Club domestic league appearances and goals as of 20 February 2026

Davide Seminara (born 5 July 1998) is an Italian footballer who plays as a left back.

== Club career ==
=== Empoli ===
Seminara is a product of Empoli youth teams. He made one bench appearance for the senior squad in December 2016 in a match against Atalanta.

==== Loan to Prato ====
On 27 July 2018, Seminara joined Serie C club Prato on a season-long loan. On 5 November he made his professional debut in Serie C for Prato as a substitute replacing Andrea Badan after an hour of play against Piacenza. On 26 November he played his first match as a starter for Prato, a 1–0 home win over Olbia, he was replaced by Andrea Badan after 68 minutes. Two weeks later, on 10 December, he played his first and only entire match for Prato, a 1–0 home defeat against Pontedera. On 21 January 2018, Seminara scored his first professional goal in the 21st minute of a 2–0 home win over Cuneo. Seminara ended his season-long loan to Prato with 20 appearances and one goal, however the club was relegated to Serie D.

==== Loan to Reggina ====
On 11 July 2018, Seminara joined another Serie C club Reggina for the entire 2018–19 season. Almost five months later, on 2 December, he made his Serie C debut for Reggina in a 3–2 home win over Rieti, he was replaced by Leonardo Mastrippolito in the 55th minute. One week later, on 9 December, Seminara played his first entire match for the club, a 2–1 away win over Sicula Leonzio. Seminara ended his season-long loan to Reggina with only 8 appearances, including 7 as a starter, however he played only one entire match and remaining an unused substitute for 17 other matches.

=== Pianese ===
On 29 July 2019, Seminara joined to newly promoted Serie C club Pianese on an undisclosed fee. On 25 August he made his debut for the club as a substitute replacing Emilio Dierna in the 67th minute of a 2–0 away defeat against Pro Vercelli. Six days later, on 31 August he played his first match as a starter for the club, a 1–0 home win over Arezzo, he was replaced by Simone Ambrogio after 76 minutes. Eight days later, on 8 September Seminara played his first entire match for Pianese, a 4–0 away win over Giana Erminio. At the end of the season the club relegated to Serie D after losing the play-out matches against Pergolettese.

=== Matelica ===
On 12 August 2020, Seminara joined to newly promoted Serie C side Matelica for an undisclosed fee. On 23 September 2020, before the season started, he suffered an ACL injury in his left knee and was expected to not play in the 2020–21 season. He recovered to make Matelica debut in the last game of the 2020–21 regular season.

== Career statistics ==
=== Club ===
As of 10 August 2020

Club	Season	League			Cup		Europe		Other		Total	
Club	Season	League	Apps	Goals	Apps	Goals	Apps	Goals	Apps	Goals	Apps	Goals
Prato (loan)	2017–18	Serie C	20	1	0	0	—		—		20	1
Reggina (loan)	2018–19	Serie C	8	0	0	0	—		—		8	0
Pianese	2019–20	Serie C	24	0	0	0	—		2 (Note: All appearance(s) in Serie C play-out.)	0	26	0
Career total			52	1	0	0	—		2	0	54	1
