= Seminara (surname) =

Seminara is an Italian surname. Notable people with the surname include:

- Davide Seminara (born 1998), Italian footballer
- Frank Seminara (born 1967), American baseball player
