= Lazzari =

Lazzari is an Italian surname and may refer to the following people:

16-17th century

- Dionisio Lazzari (1617–1689), Italian sculptor and architect
- Giorgio Lazzari (1564–1615), Italian Catholic Bishop of Minori
- Tiburzio Lazzari, Venerable (1592-1625), a soldier who vowed to fight only enemies of the Catholic faith

18th century

- Andrea Lazzari (1754–1831), Italian historian

19-20th century

- Andrea Lazzari (born 1984), Italian footballer
- Bice Lazzari (1900–1981), Italian painter
- Carla Lazzari, better known as simply Carla (born 2005), French singer
- Chad Allen Lazzari (born 1974), retired American actor
- Costantino Lazzari (1857–1927), Italian politician
- Daniele Lazzari (born 1997), Italian footballer
- Emilio Lazzari (1823–1902), Italian painter
- Flavio Lazzari (born 1986), Italian footballer
- Lani Lazzari (entrepreneur), American female founder of the Simple Sugars company
- Lorenzo Lazzari (footballer) (born 2003), Sammarinese footballer
- Magda Bianchi Lázzari, Guatemalan diplomat, activist, and the former First Lady of Guatemala from 1991 until 1993
- Manuel Lazzari (born 1993), Italian footballer who plays as a right-sided midfielder
- Niccolò Lazzari, Italian film editor from the 1940s to '60s
- Pietro Lazzari (1895–1979), Italian-American artist and sculptor
- Roberto Lazzari (1937–2017), Italian retired swimmer
- Sylvio Lazzari (1857–1944), French composer
- Virgilio Lazzari (1887–1953), Italian operatic bass

== See also ==
- Rodrigo De Lazzari (born 1980), Brazilian footballer of Italian descent
