= Lazzeri =

Lazzeri is a surname. Notable people with the surname include:

- Maria Domenica Lazzeri (1815–1848), Italian mystic
- Tony Lazzeri (1903–1946), Italian-American baseball player
- Valerio Lazzeri (born 1963), Swiss Roman Catholic bishop

== See also ==
- Lazzari
