= Bonucci =

Bonucci is an Italian surname. Notable people with the surname include:

- Alberto Bonucci (1918–1969), Italian film actor
- Leonardo Bonucci (born 1987), Italian footballer

== See also ==
- 36036 Bonucci, main-belt asteroid
- Benucci
- Bonacci
