= Carpani =

Carpani is an Italian surname that may refer to

- Alberto Carpani (born 1956), Italian singer
- Gianluca Carpani (born 1993), Italian football player
- Giuseppe Carpani (1751–1825), Italian poet, translator and opera librettist
- Rachael Carpani (1980–2025), Australian actress
- Ricardo Carpani (1930–1997), Argentine artist
