= Benucci =

Benucci is a surname. Notable people with the surname include:

- Francesco Benucci (c. 1745–5 April 1824), Italian bass/baritone singer
- Massimiliano Benucci (born 1998), Italian footballer
- Henriette Benucci (1858–1943), wife of French statesman Raymond Poincaré

== See also ==
- Bonucci
