= Alessandro Raimo =

Italian footballer (born 1999)

Personal information
- Date of birth: 8 March 1999 (age 27)
- Place of birth: Piombino, Italy
- Height: 1.78 m (5 ft 10 in)
- Position: Right-back

Team information
- Current team: Catania
- Number: 19

Youth career
- –2016: Fiorentina
- 2016–2019: Livorno

Senior career*
Years	Team	Apps	(Gls)
2017–2019	Livorno	0	(0)
2017–2018	→ Massese (loan)	32	(0)
2018–2019	→ Pontedera (loan)	5	(0)
2019	Ponsacco	13	(0)
2019–2022	Grosseto	82	(3)
2022–2023	Siena	37	(1)
2023–2024	Carrarese	7	(0)
2024	→ Recanatese (loan)	14	(1)
2024–	Catania	43	(1)
- * Club domestic league appearances and goals as of 1 April 2026

Alessandro Raimo (born 8 March 1999) is an Italian professional footballer who plays as a right-back for Serie C Group C club Catania.

== Club career ==
Born in Piombino, Raimo started his footballer career in Fiorentina youth sector.

He joined to Livorno U-19 in 2016. On 24 August 2017, he was loaned to Serie D club Massese. He was loaned again the next season, on 17 July 2019 to Pontedera.

On 3 December 2019, he signed with Grosseto.

On 26 August 2022, Raimo joined Siena on a multi-year contract.

On 28 August 2024, Raimo signed a two-season contract with Catania.
