= Bonacci =

Bonacci is an Italian surname. Notable with this surname include:

- Cris Bonacci (born 1962), Australian-born producer, songwriter, and musician
- Jim Bonacci, developer of the Happy Wheels video game
- Maria Alinda Bonacci Brunamonti (1841–1903), Italian poet and scholar
- Teodorico Bonacci (1838–1905), Italian Minister of Justice
- Leonardo Bonacci (c. 1170–c. 1240–50), better known as Fibonacci, Italian mathematician
- P. A. Bonacci, one of the victims involved in the Franklin child prostitution ring allegations

== See also ==
- Boni (disambiguation)
- Bonetti (disambiguation)
