= Nicholas Allievi =

Italian footballer (born 1992)

Personal information
- Date of birth: 20 April 1992 (age 34)
- Place of birth: Varese, Italy
- Height: 1.85 m (6 ft 1 in)
- Position: Centre-back

Team information
- Current team: Pro Palazzolo
- Number: 6

Youth career
- –2008: Varese
- 2008–2011: AlbinoLeffe

Senior career*
Years	Team	Apps	(Gls)
2011–2012	FeralpiSalò	9	(0)
2012–2015	AlbinoLeffe	84	(1)
2015–2017	FeralpiSalò	44	(1)
2017–2021	Juve Stabia	86	(4)
2021–2022	Como	6	(0)
2022	Cesena	10	(0)
2022–2024	Rimini	15	(0)
2024	Recanatese	5	(0)
2024–	Pro Palazzolo	31	(2)
- * Club domestic league appearances and goals as of 22 February 2026

Nicholas Allievi (born 20 April 1992) is an Italian footballer who plays as a centre back for Serie D club Pro Palazzolo.

== Career ==
Born in Varese, Lombardy, Allievi started his career at Lombard club Varese. At 16 years old he was signed by serie B club, AlbinoLeffe.

In July 2011 he was signed by Lega Pro Prima Divisione club FeralpiSalò in co-ownership deal. In June 2012 Allievi returned to AlbinoLeffe.

In July 2015 he was signed definirlo By FeralpiSaló in serie C.

In January 2017 he signed with Juve Stabia in Serie C, where in 2018/2019 he won the Serie C championship playing as a starter, scoring 2 goals and injuring his knee in April 2019.

In November 2019 he returned from the accident and played in Serie B with Juve Stabia.

In January 2021 he signed with Como. and won the Serie C championship and injured the Achilles tendon.

On 28 January 2022 he joined Cesena until the end of the season.

On 8 July 2022, he signed with Rimini.

On 16 July 2024, he signed for Pro Palazzolo, following a six month stint at Recanatese.
