= Stadio Centro d'Italia – Manlio Scopigno =

Football stadium in Rieti, Italy

Coordinates: 42.410954°N 12.886797°E

Stadio Centro d'Italia - Manlio Scopigno
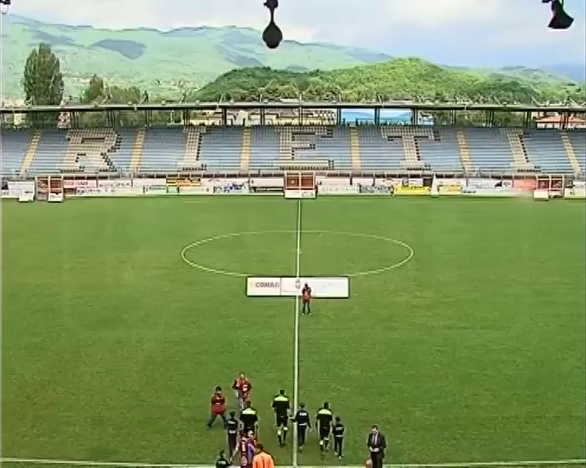
- Interactive map of Stadio Centro d'Italia - Manlio Scopigno
- Former names: Stadio Centro d'Italia (1991-2005)
- Location: Rieti, Italy
- Owner: Municipality of Rieti
- Capacity: 10,163
- Surface: Grass

Construction
- Opened: 1991
- Structural engineers: Luigi Corradi, Dario Bugli

Tenant
- F.C. Rieti (Serie C)

The Stadio Centro d'Italia – Manlio Scopigno is a football stadium in Rieti, Italy. It is the home stadium of F.C. Rieti and has a seating capacity of 10,163.

Built by Rieti's municipal government, it entered into operation in 1991 and was ultimately inaugurated in 1997, with a match between the Under-21 national teams of Italy and England.

The name of the stadium (Italian: Centro d'Italia, which means "Center of Italy") recalls the tradition that indicates Rieti as the geographical center of the Italian Peninsula; since 2005 it is also named after Manlio Scopigno, a leading player in FC Rieti's golden era in Serie B.

== History ==
Until 1990s, the main football pitch in Rieti was the viale Fassini stadium, a small football field with a capacity of no more than 2000 spectators, which was built in 1927 as part of the worker village of the Supertessile industrial plant (it: Supertessile).

In 1989, after the promotion of FC Rieti to Serie D, the construction of a more modern and large facility was considered no longer deferrable, so the municipality of Rieti decided to build a new stadium with grass surface in the suburb of Campoloniano, taking advantage of Italia '90 World Cup funds.

The tender procedure was won by engineers Luigi Corradi and Dario Bugli; the initial project also included a running track which was later dropped. Construction works were soon started, but only a part of the overall design was built: the field and one of the main grandstands (the one now known as "Valle Santa"). The new facility was completed in 1991 and was inaugurated with a friendly match between Dino Zoff's Lazio and Leonardo Acori's FC Rieti.

In 1997 Rieti's mayor Antonio Cicchetti decided to enlarge the stadium, building the missing part of the original project: the second grandstand (named "Terminillo"), the two curvas and the lighting system, while the running track was dropped, as it was decided that track and field events would remain in stadio Raul Guidobaldi. The final cost was of 4.5 billion liras. The enlarged stadium was inaugurated on 11 October 1997 with a match between the Under-21 national teams of Italy (led by Francesco Totti) and England, won by England by 0-1; TV host Paola Perego served as godmother of the event.

A few years later, the high-mast lighting towers collapsed on a day of strong wind, without causing victims; the damaged structures were replaced at the expense of the company that had executed the works in 1997.

== Description ==
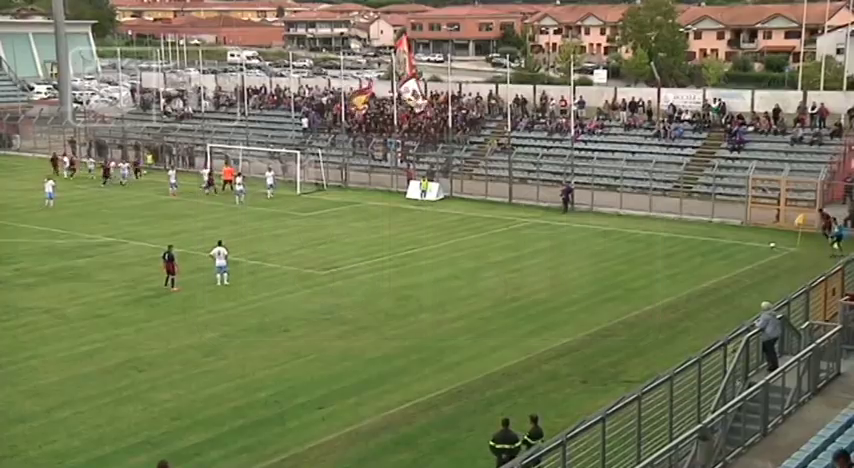
The curva sud

The stadium was designed by engineers Luigi Corradi and Dario Bugli. It consists of two main grandstands, covered and built in english fashion, and by two uncovered curvas. All of them are equipped with colored seats which recall the city's name and colors.

The two main grandstands, both covered, are slightly raised from the football field, and they're not perfectly straight but slightly curved. They are longer than usual since the original project included a running track, dropped during construction. The east grandstand, named Terminillo due to mount Terminillo being behind it, can be noted for its huge Rieti writing (white edged in black) formed by the seats; the west grandstand, named Vallesanta due to the plain placed behind it, nicknamed Valle Santa, also hosts the press forum.

The two curvas are uncovered, lower than the grandstands, and unconnected with them.
