= US Recanatese =

Italian football club

Recanatese
- Full name: Unione Sportiva Recanatese
- Nicknames: I Leopardiani (the Leopardians); I Giallorossi (The Yellow and Reds)
- Founded: 1923; 103 years ago
- Ground: Stadio Nicola Tubaldi, Recanati, Italy
- Capacity: 3,000
- Chairman: Adolfo Guzzini
- Manager: Giovanni Pagliari
- League: Serie D
- 2023–24: Serie C Group B, 18th of 20 (relegated)
Home colours	Away colours

U.S. Recanatese is an Italian professional football club, based in Recanati, Marche. Recanatese currently plays in Serie D.

== History ==
The club was founded in 1923. They played almost exclusively in the amateur leagues in Italy throughout their history, except for a short-lived appearance in Serie C during the 1947–48 season.

On 8 May 2022, Recanatese mathematically won the 2021–22 Serie D Group F title following a win against Matese, thus ensuring themselves a spot in the 2022–23 Serie C season, and a first appearance in the Italian third tier after 74 years of absence.

== Colors and badge ==
The team's colors are yellow and red.

== Current squad ==
As of 1 February 2024

Note: Flags indicate national team as defined under FIFA eligibility rules; some limited exceptions apply. Players may hold more than one non-FIFA nationality.

No.	Pos.	Nation	Player
1	GK	ITA	Gabriel Meli
2	DF	ITA	Gianluca Longobardi
3	DF	ITA	Nicholas Allievi
5	DF	ALB	Cristian Shiba (on loan from Südtirol)
6	MF	GAM	Francis Gomez
7	DF	RUS	Andrea Pelamatti (on loan from Torres)
8	MF	ITA	Gianluca Carpani
9	FW	ITA	Federico Melchiorri
10	MF	ITA	Alessandro Sbaffo (captain)
11	FW	ITA	Mirco Lipari (on loan from Juventus)
12	GK	ITA	Nicola Mascolo
14	DF	ITA	Edoardo Ferrante
16	MF	ITA	Biagio Morrone
17	FW	ITA	Destiny Egharevba (on loan from Fiorentina)
19	DF	ITA	Alessandro Raimo (on loan from Carrarese)

No.	Pos.	Nation	Player
23	MF	HON	Valerio Marinacci
24	MF	ITA	Marco Raparo
27	MF	ITA	Filippo Guidobaldi (on loan from Fiorentina)
30	FW	ITA	Andrea Mazia (on loan from Bologna)
31	MF	ITA	Mattia Fiorini
33	DF	ITA	Francesco Rizzo
36	FW	ITA	Daniele Ferretti
54	DF	ITA	Manuel Peretti
55	DF	ITA	Moussa Mané (on loan from Bari)
56	MF	ITA	Antonio Prisco (on loan from Benevento)
58	DF	ITA	Manuel Tiberi
59	DF	ITA	Angelo Veltri (on loan from Benevento)
74	FW	MNE	Matteo Ahmetaj (on loan from Bari)
97	FW	ITA	Alessio Re (on loan from Ascoli)
