= Daniele Ferretti =

Italian football player (born 1986)

Personal information
- Date of birth: 30 August 1986 (age 40)
- Place of birth: Atri, Italy
- Height: 1.70 m (5 ft 7 in)
- Position: Midfielder

Team information
- Current team: Fermana
- Number: 7

Senior career*
Years	Team	Apps	(Gls)
2004–2005	Alba Adriatica	28	(4)
2005–2009	Civitanovese	121	(12)
2009–2011	Mezzocorona	62	(14)
2011–2013	Bassano	51	(5)
2013–2014	Delta Porto Tolle	31	(6)
2014–2015	Lucchese	35	(6)
2015–2017	Gubbio	70	(18)
2017–2020	Trapani	37	(7)
2020	Avellino	8	(0)
2020–2021	Ravenna	38	(3)
2021	Sambenedettese	12	(2)
2021–2024	Recanatese	79	(3)
2024–	Fermana	11	(1)
- * Club domestic league appearances and goals as of 17 November 2024

Daniele Ferretti (born 30 August 1986) is an Italian football player who plays for Serie D club Fermana.

== Club career ==
He spent the first seven seasons of his senior career in the fifth-tier Eccellenza and fourth-tier Lega Pro Seconda Divisione.

He made his professional debut in the 2011–12 season in Lega Pro Prima Divisione for Bassano.

For the 2019–20 season, his club Trapani advanced to the second-tier Serie B.

He made his Serie B debut for Trapani on 24 August 2019 in a game against Ascoli. He substituted Felice Evacuo at half-time and scored his first Serie B goal in an eventual 1–3 loss. He made his first Serie B start on 31 August 2019 in a game against Venezia.

On 31 January 2020, he signed a 1.5-year contract with Avellino.

On 14 September 2020, he moved to Ravenna on a season-long contract that would be automatically renewed if some conditions are met.

On 24 September 2021, he joined Sambenedettese in Serie D.
