= Niccolò Ricchi =

Italian footballer

Personal information
- Date of birth: 10 December 2000 (age 25)
- Place of birth: Florence, Italy
- Height: 1.81 m (5 ft 11 in)
- Position: Left back

Youth career
- Empoli

Senior career*
Years	Team	Apps	(Gls)
2018–2020	Empoli	0	(0)
2019–2020	→ Ravenna (loan)	11	(0)
2020	→ Cavese (loan)	5	(0)
2020–2021	Cavese	21	(1)
2021–2022	Viterbese	4	(0)
2022–2023	Lucchese	0	(0)
- * Club domestic league appearances and goals as of 23 April 2023

Niccolò Ricchi (born 10 November 1998) is an Italian professional footballer who plays as a left back.

== Club career ==
Born in Florence, Ricchi started his career in Empoli youth sector. He was promoted to the first team in the 2018–19 season, and was an unused substitute on 19 January 2020 against Cagliari for Serie A.

On 18 July 2019, he was loaned to Serie C club Ravenna.

In January 2020, he was loaned again to Serie C club Cavese. He signed with the club the next season.

On 6 July 2021, he signed with Viterbese.

On 8 February 2022, he joined Lucchese.
