= Emilio Dierna =

Italian football player (born 1987)

Personal information
- Date of birth: 12 February 1987 (age 39)
- Place of birth: Gela, Italy
- Height: 1.89 m (6 ft 2 in)
- Position: Centre back

Team information
- Current team: Viterbese

Senior career*
Years	Team	Apps	(Gls)
2005–2006	Cosenza	20	(1)
2006–2007	Montevarchi	18	(0)
2007–2008	Grosseto	1	(0)
2008–2009	Sangiovannese	29	(0)
2010–2013	Poggibonsi	93	(10)
2013–2014	Arezzo	31	(1)
2014–2015	Ancona	29	(1)
2015–2017	Viterbese	51	(4)
2017–2018	Gubbio	22	(0)
2018–2019	Modena	27	(3)
2019–2020	Pianese	25	(1)
2020–2024	Follonica Gavorrano	121	(15)
2024	Scarlino		
2024–2025	Grosseto	16	(4)
2025–	Viterbese		
- * Club domestic league appearances and goals as of 14 December 2025

Emilio Dierna (born 12 February 1987) is an Italian football player who plays for Eccellenza club Viterbese.

== Club career ==
He made his Serie B debut for Grosseto on 1 June 2008 in a game against Spezia.

On 7 July 2020 he signed with Follonica Gavorrano.
