= Miguel Alcântara =

Brazilian footballer

Personal information
- Full name: Miguel de Alcântara
- Date of birth: 22 February 2000 (age 26)
- Place of birth: Americana, Brazil
- Height: 1.93 m (6 ft 4 in)
- Position: Centre-back

Team information
- Current team: Kluczevia Stargard

Youth career
- –2019: São Paulo

Senior career*
Years	Team	Apps	(Gls)
2017–2019	São Paulo	1	(0)
2019–2021	Ascoli	0	(0)
2021	→ Água Santa (loan)	3	(0)
2022	Votuporanguense	14	(0)
2022–2023	Inter de Lages	11	(1)
2023	→ Cianorte (loan)	2	(0)
2023	→ União São João (loan)	28	(1)
2024	Velo Clube	17	(0)
2024–2025	Bagé	8	(0)
2025	→ FC Cascavel (loan)	9	(0)
2025–2026	São Bernardo FC	0	(0)
2026	→ CRAC (loan)	10	(1)
2026	→ Manaus (loan)	0	(0)
2026–	Kluczevia Stargard	0	(0)
- * Club domestic league appearances and goals as of 11:22, 20 July 2026 (UTC)

Miguel de Alcântara (born 22 February 2000) is a Brazilian professional footballer who plays as a centre-back for Polish III liga club Kluczevia Stargard.

== Career ==
Graduated from São Paulo's youth categories, he participated in a game with the B team in the 2017 Copa Paulista, in addition to being champion in 2018 of the Copa do Brasil U20. In September 2019, he was transferred to Ascoli for €500,000.

In 2023, Alcântara was one of the main players in União São João's title campaign in the Second Division of São Paulo. In 2024, Alcantara was part of the 2024 Campeonato Paulista Serie A2 title campaign with Velo Clube, and later played for Bagé. For the 2025 season, Alcântara moved on loan to Cascavel. In 2025, he was signed by São Bernardo FC but never played for the team, being loaned to CRAC and Manaus in 2026.

On 15 July 2026, the Polish fourth division club ZKS Kluczevia Stargard announced the signing of Alcântara.

== Honours ==
São Paulo

- Copa do Brasil Sub-20: 2018

União São João

- Campeonato Paulista Segunda Divisão: 2023

Velo Clube

- Campeonato Paulista Série A2: 2024
