= Maria Alinda Bonacci Brunamonti =

Italian poet and scholar

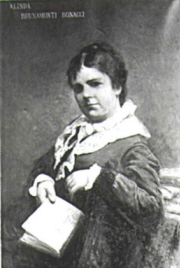
Maria Alinda Bonacci Brunamonti

Maria Alinda Bonacci Brunamonti (21 August 1841 – 3 February 1903) was an Italian poet and scholar. Her poetry dealt with contemporary issues, and she became the first woman in Italy to vote.

Bonacci Brunamonti published her first poetry aged 14. Her motto was innovare serbando ("innovation through conservation"). Bonacci Brunamonti's poetry explored conflicts, such as the 1859 Perugia uprising, the Battle of Magenta and the Battle of Solferino. As a devout Catholic, she dedicated some of her works to Pope Pius IX. Her poetry used classical metre and verse structures. Bonacci Brunamonti was forced to stop writing following a stroke in 1897.

On 9 November 1860, she was permitted to vote in a plebiscite regarding the annexation of Marche and Umbria to Piedmont, due to her political poetry. She was the first woman in Italy to vote.

Her father was Gratiliano Bonacci (1802–1871), a lawyer and professor of rhetoric. Born Maria Alinda Bonacci, she married Pietro Brunamonti in 1868. Bonacci Brunamonti was born in and died in Perugia, and she lived there for much of her life, also frequently visiting her father's birthplace of Recanati. Bonacci Brunamonti taught at the Sapienza University of Rome. She was a watercolor painter of flowers and plants.
