= Gabriel Meli =

Italian football player (born 1999)

Personal information
- Full name: Gabriel Manuel Meli
- Date of birth: 5 February 1999 (age 27)
- Place of birth: Bagno a Ripoli, Italy
- Height: 1.88 m (6 ft 2 in)
- Position: Goalkeeper

Team information
- Current team: Messina

Youth career
- –2012: Prato
- 2012–2018: Empoli

Senior career*
Years	Team	Apps	(Gls)
2016–2023	Empoli	0	(0)
2018–2019	→ Pistoiese (loan)	21	(0)
2020	→ Rimini (loan)	5	(0)
2020–2021	→ Fano (loan)	17	(0)
2021–2022	→ Südtirol (loan)	0	(0)
2022–2023	→ Apollon Larissa (loan)	5	(0)
2023	→ Recanatese (loan)	2	(0)
2023–2024	Recanatese	35	(0)
2024–2025	Taranto	2	(0)
2025–	Messina	0	(0)

International career^{‡}
2015–2016	Italy U17	2	(0)
2016–2017	Italy U18	5	(0)
2017	Italy U19	1	(0)
2018	Italy U20	1	(0)
- * Club domestic league appearances and goals as of 27 January 2025 ‡ National team caps and goals as of 8 August 2018

Gabriel Manuel Meli (born 5 February 1999) is an Italian professional footballer who plays as a goalkeeper for Serie D club Messina.

== Club career ==
=== Empoli ===
Meli is a youth product of Empoli youth system. He made his first appearance for the team as an un-used substitute for the last matches of the 2015–16 season, he made also other bench appearances in the 2016–17 and 2017–18 seasons, but he never appeared on the field. Meli also won the 2017–18 Serie B title.

==== Loan to Pistoiese ====
On 18 July 2018, Meli was loaned to Serie C club Pistoiese on a 2-year loan deal. On 26 September he made his professional debut in Serie C debut for Pistoiese in a 3–3 away draw against Pro Piacenza. On 3 November he kept his first clean sheet for Pistoiese in a 0–0 home draw against Alessandria. He became Pistoiese's first-choice early in the season. Eight days later, he kept his second consecutive clean sheet in a 0–0 away draw against Cuneo. One week later, on 18 November, he kept his third clean sheet in a 2–0 home win over Piacenza. However he became the second goalkeeper behind Jacopo Pagnini in the second part of the season. Meli ended his season-long loan to Pistoiese with 21 appearances, 5 clean sheets and 27 goals conceded. Empoli recalled him from loan early, at the end of the first season.

==== Loan to Rimini ====
After remaining an unused goalkeeper in the first part of the season, on 21 January 2020, Meli was loaned to Serie C club Rimini on loan until the end of the season. Five days later, on 26 January, Meli made his debut for Rimini in a 3–1 home defeat against Vicenza Virtus. He became Rimini's first-choice goalkeeper in the second part season. Three weeks later, on 15 February, he kept his first clean sheet for the club in a 2–0 home win over Modena and one more week later, on 22 February, he kept his second clean sheet in a 0–0 away draw against Virtus Verona. Meli ended his 6-month loan to Rimini with only 5 appearances, 6 goals conceded and 2 clean sheet, however at the end of the season Rimini was relegated in Serie D.

==== Loan to Fano ====
On 21 August 2020, Meli was signed by Serie C club Alma Juventus Fano on a season-long loan deal. On 27 September he made his league debut for the club in a 2–2 away draw against Perugia. Ten days later, on 7 October, Meli kept his first clean sheet for the club in a 0–0 away draw against Carpi. On 11 November he kept his second clean sheet for the club in a 0–0 away draw against Fermana and four weeks later his third clean sheet with another 0–0 away draw against Vis Pesaro. He lost the role of starting goalkeeper to Aniello Viscovo in the second half of the season. Meli ended his season-long loan to Fano with 17 appearances, all in the first part of the season, 23 goals conceded and 4 clean sheet.

==== Loan to Südtirol ====
On 27 July 2021, he was loaned to Serie C club Südtirol.

==== Loan to Recanatese ====
On 25 January 2023, Meli moved to Serie C club Recanatese on loan.

=== Taranto ===
On 20 August 2024, Meli signed a one-year deal with Taranto.

== International career ==
Meli was part of the Italy squad at the 2016 UEFA European Under-17 Championship, but stayed on the bench in all games behind the first-choice goalkeeper Alessandro Plizzari.

== Career statistics ==
=== Club ===
As of 18 July 2021

Club	Season	League			Cup		Europe		Other		Total	
Club	Season	League	Apps	Goals	Apps	Goals	Apps	Goals	Apps	Goals	Apps	Goals
Pistoiese (loan)	2018–19	Serie C	21	0	0	0	—		—		21	0
Rimini (loan)	2019–20	Serie C	5	0	—		—		—		5	0
Fano (loan)	2020–21	Serie C	17	0	0	0	—		—		17	0
Career total			43	0	0	0	—		—		43	0

== Honours ==
=== Club ===
Empoli

- Serie B: 2017–18
