= Biagio Morrone =

Italian footballer (born 2000)

Personal information
- Date of birth: 4 March 2000 (age 26)
- Place of birth: Castellammare di Stabia, Italy
- Height: 1.76 m (5 ft 9 in)
- Position: Midfielder

Team information
- Current team: Nocerina
- Number: 4

Youth career
- Sant'Aniello di Gragnano
- Benevento
- –2014: Paganese
- 2014–2019: Juventus
- 2019–2020: Salernitana

Senior career*
Years	Team	Apps	(Gls)
2018–2019	Juventus U23	0	(0)
2019–2020	Salernitana	0	(0)
2020–2022	Lazio	0	(0)
2020	→ Rieti (loan)	6	(0)
2020–2021	→ Foggia (loan)	19	(0)
2021–2022	→ Monopoli (loan)	24	(0)
2022–2024	Recanatese	69	(3)
2024–2025	Turris		
2025–	Nocerina	31	(0)

International career
2017	Italy U18	4	(0)
- * Club domestic league appearances and goals as of 22 Juny 2026

Biagio Morrone (born 4 March 2000) is an Italian footballer who plays as a midfielder for Serie D club Nocerina.

== Club career ==
Morrone joined Juventus youth teams in 2014 and began to play for their Under-19 squad in the 2017–18 season. He played for Juventus in the 2017–18 UEFA Youth League and 2018–19 UEFA Youth League. In 2018–19 season, he was part of their Serie C farm-club Juventus U23, but did not make any league appearances.

On 12 July 2019, he signed a three-year contract with Serie B club Salernitana. He spent most of the first part of the 2019–20 season with Salernitana's senior squad, but again remained on the bench in all the league and cup games.

On 31 January 2020, Salernitana sold his rights to Serie A club Lazio. On the same day, Lazio loaned him to Serie C club Rieti.

He made his professional Serie C debut for Rieti on 2 February 2020 in a game against Potenza. He substituted Enrico Zampa in the 24th minute and was sent-off in the 83rd minute after receiving two cautions in short succession. He made his first start on 16 February 2020 against Paganese.

On 10 October 2020, he joined Foggia on loan.

On 5 August 2021, he went to Monopoli on loan.

On 1 September 2022, Morrone signed with Recanatese.

== International career ==
Morrone was first called up to represent his country in September 2017 for the Under-18 squad friendlies.
