= Emilio Lazzari =

Italian painter (1823–1902)

Emilio Lazzari (1823 in Arcisate or Legnano – 1902 in Turate, Milan) was an Italian painter, mainly depicting landscapes.

He studied in Brera Academy, and won an award there in 1850. He was a resident of Milan. He exhibited few works. His canvas Salve! was exhibited at Rome alla Mostra Nazionale del 1883, and Ultima onda che venne at Turin in 1884.
