= Simone Ambrogio =

Italian footballer (born 2000)

Personal information
- Date of birth: 11 February 2000 (age 26)
- Place of birth: Turin, Italy
- Height: 1.80 m (5 ft 11 in)
- Positions: Centre back; full-back

Team information
- Current team: Pianese

Youth career
- –2019: Torino

Senior career*
| Years | Team | Apps | (Gls) |
| 2019–2020 | Torino | 0 | (0) |
| 2019–2020 | → Pianese (loan) | 13 | (0) |
| 2020 | Pianese | 0 | (0) |
| 2020– | Pianese | 3 | (0) |

International career
| 2015 | Italy U15 | 1 | (0) |
| 2015–2016 | Italy U16 | 10 | (0) |
- * Club domestic league appearances and goals as of 19:24, 1 January 2021 (UTC)

Simone Ambrogio (born 11 February 2000) is an Italian football player who plays for U.S. Pianese in Serie D.

He was born as a central defender, but if necessary he can also be used as a full-back on both sides. He prefers the right foot, but does not disdain the use of the opposite foot and is a good header.

== Club career ==
=== Torino ===
At the age of 8 he is selected at the Academy of Torino FC. In the grenade team, he carries out the entire youth sector, from the Pulcini to the Primavera. With the latter he played two seasons, in which he won the 2018 Italian Cup in the category.

==== Pianese ====
On 14 July 2019 he joined Serie C club Pianese on loan.

He made his professional Serie C debut for Pianese on 25 August 2019 in a game against Pro Vercelli. He started the game and played the whole match.

On 2 January in training he suffered a compound fracture of the fifth metatarsal of his right foot. He was subsequently operated on 15 January at the Maria Vittoria Hospital in Turin. He was expected to return to the field at the end of February. Serie C season was abandoned before he could recover due to the COVID-19 pandemic in Italy.

Ambrogio left Pianese at the end of the 2019–20 season. He remained without contract until 25 November 2020, where he signed a new deal with Pianese.

== International ==
He was first called up to represent his country in 2015 for the Under-15 squad friendlies.

He also played for the Under-16 squad, but not for any older age brackets.
