= Federico Nacci =

Italian footballer (born 1998)

Personal information
- Date of birth: 5 April 1998 (age 28)
- Place of birth: Collegno, Italy
- Height: 1.84 m (6 ft 0 in)
- Position: Midfielder

Team information
- Current team: Cuneo

Youth career
- –2015: Juventus
- 2014–2015: → Torino (loan)
- 2015–2016: Alessandria

Senior career*
| Years | Team | Apps | (Gls) |
| 2016 | Chieri | 0 | (0) |
| 2016–2017 | Pro Eureka | 28 | (3) |
| 2017–2020 | Pisa | 0 | (0) |
| 2018–2019 | → Paganese (loan) | 38 | (1) |
| 2019–2020 | → Lecco (loan) | 5 | (0) |
| 2020 | → Bisceglie (loan) | 8 | (0) |
| 2021 | Portici 1906 | 18 | (0) |
| 2021–2022 | Campobasso | 10 | (1) |
| 2022 | Chisola Calcio | 7 | (0) |
| 2022–2023 | Vastese | 18 | (0) |
| 2023–2024 | PDHAE | 32 | (2) |
| 2024–2025 | GS Arconatese 1926 | 29 | (0) |
| 2025– | Cuneo | | |
- * Club domestic league appearances and goals as of 08:41, 23 October 2026 (UTC)

Federico Nacci (born 5 April 1998) is an Italian footballer who plays as a midfielder for Cuneo.

== Career ==
Born in Collegno, Nacci started his career in Juventus, Torino and Alessandria youth sector. As a senior, he joined to Serie D club Chieri for the 2015–16 season.

Nacci made his senior debut in the 2016–17 Serie D season with Pro Eureka.

On 5 July 2017, he moved to Serie D club Pisa. At the middle of the season, in January 2018, he joined to Serie C club Paganese on loan. Nacci made his professional debut on 4 February against Juve Stabia. His loan was extended the next year.

On 13 August 2019, he was loaned to Lecco.

On 13 February 2021, he joined to Serie D club Portici 1906.

The next season, on 9 August 2021, he returned to Serie C and signed with Campobasso.
