= Daniele Lazzari =

Italian footballer (born 1997)

Personal information
- Date of birth: 3 December 1997 (age 28)
- Place of birth: Rome, Italy
- Height: 1.92 m (6 ft 4 in)
- Position: Goalkeeper

Team information
- Current team: Viterbese

Youth career
- 2009–2017: Lazio
- 2014–2015: → Bari (loan)
- 2015: → Trapani (loan)
- 2016: → Racing Roma (loan)
- 2017: → Flaminia (loan)

Senior career*
Years	Team	Apps	(Gls)
2017–2018	Lupa Roma	30	(0)
2018–2019	Salernitana	0	(0)
2019	Rieti	10	(0)
2020	Salernitana	0	(0)
2020–2022	Juve Stabia	3	(0)
2022–2023	Grosseto	3	(0)
2023–	Viterbese	0	(0)
- * Club domestic league appearances and goals as of 11 December 2022

Daniele Lazzari (born 3 December 1997) is an Italian footballer who plays as a goalkeeper for Promozione Lazio Group B club Viterbese.

== Club career ==
Lazzari played at Lazio youth levels, loaned to different low-tier teams. He made his professional debut in the Lega Pro in Racing Roma, on 13 November 2016 against Piacenza, coming as a substitute for Luca Savelloni at half-time. This was his last match in the 2016–17 third league. In the summer of 2018, Serie B side Salernitana signed him for an undisclosed fee.

On 25 July 2019, he signed with Rieti.

On 26 February 2020, he returned to Salernitana until the end of the 2019–20 season.

On 19 September 2020, he joined Juve Stabia. On 27 January 2022, his contract was terminated by mutual consent.

On 17 February 2023, Lazzari signed with Viterbese.
