= Gianluca Carpani =

Italian footballer

Personal information
- Date of birth: 29 August 1993 (age 33)
- Place of birth: Ascoli Piceno, Italy
- Height: 1.82 m (6 ft 0 in)
- Position: Midfielder

Team information
- Current team: Teramo
- Number: 11

Senior career*
Years	Team	Apps	(Gls)
2010–2013	Sambenedettese	53	(9)
2013–2019	Ascoli	115	(11)
2019	→ Rieti (loan)	13	(0)
2019–2021	Fano	59	(3)
2021–2022	Montevarchi Aquila	31	(4)
2022–2024	Recanatese	74	(20)
2024–2025	Catania	20	(3)
2025	Ascoli	13	(1)
2025–	Teramo	12	(5)
- * Club domestic league appearances and goals as of 11 January 2026

Gianluca Carpani (born 29 August 1993) is an Italian footballer who plays as a midfielder for Serie D club Teramo.

== Club career ==
On 30 January 2019, he joined Rieti on loan.

On 12 August 2019, he signed a 2-year contract with Serie C club Fano.

On 9 September 2021, he joined Montevarchi Aquila.

On 9 July 2022, he moved to Recanatese.
