= Riccardo Moreo =

Italian footballer

Personal information
- Date of birth: 24 February 1996 (age 30)
- Place of birth: Milan, Italy
- Height: 1.88 m (6 ft 2 in)
- Position: Forward

Team information
- Current team: Sanremese
- Number: 9

Youth career
- –2013: Milan
- 2013–2016: AlbinoLeffe
- 2015–2016: → Virtus Entella (loan)

Senior career*
Years	Team	Apps	(Gls)
2013–2015	AlbinoLeffe	1	(0)
2016–2018	AlbinoLeffe	22	(0)
2017–2018	→ Akragas (loan)	32	(0)
2018–2019	Prato	32	(20)
2019–2021	Cosenza	2	(0)
2019–2020	→ Monopoli (loan)	5	(0)
2020–2021	→ Lucchese (loan)	8	(0)
2021	→ Novara (loan)	6	(0)
2021–2022	Pergolettese	13	(2)
2022–2023	Pro Sesto	9	(0)
2023	Roma City	7	(2)
2023	Pro Sesto	0	(0)
2023–2024	Prato	26	(5)
2025	APC Chions	13	(2)
2025–	Sanremese	25	(5)
- * Club domestic league appearances and goals as of 25 June 2026

Riccardo Moreo (born 24 February 1996) is an Italian footballer who plays as a forward for Serie D club Sanremese.

== Career ==
Moreo made his Serie C debut for AlbinoLeffe on 11 October 2014 in a game against Feralpisalò.

On 15 July 2019, he signed a three-year contract with Cosenza.

On 2 September 2019, he joined Monopoli on loan. On 5 October 2020, he was loaned to Lucchese. On 1 February 2021, he moved on a new loan to Novara.

On 27 August 2021, he went to Pergolettese on permanent basis.

On 20 July 2022, Moreo signed with Pro Sesto. His contract with Pro Sesto was terminated by mutual consent on 31 January 2023, and he joined Roma City in Serie D.
