= Alessandro Bordin =

Italian footballer (born 1998)

Personal information
- Date of birth: 1 August 1998 (age 28)
- Place of birth: Latina, Italy
- Height: 1.76 m (5 ft 9 in)
- Position: Midfielder

Team information
- Current team: Anzio
- Number: 8

Youth career
- –2017: Roma

Senior career*
Years	Team	Apps	(Gls)
2017–2019	Roma	0	(0)
2017–2018	→ Ternana (loan)	6	(0)
2018–2019	→ Perugia (loan)	5	(0)
2019–2021	Spezia	0	(0)
2019–2020	→ Pistoiese (loan)	19	(0)
2020–2021	→ Casertana (loan)	15	(0)
2021–2022	Fidelis Andria	3	(0)
2022–2023	Latina	22	(0)
2023–2025	ASD Atletico Pontinia		
2025–	Anzio	0	(0)

International career
2014	Italy U16	6	(0)
2014	Italy U17	4	(0)
2015–2016	Italy U18	7	(2)
2016–2017	Italy U19	9	(0)
2018	Italy U20	2	(1)
- * Club domestic league appearances and goals as of 21 February 2026

Alessandro Bordin (born 1 August 1998) is an Italian footballer who plays as a midfielder for Serie D club Anzio.

== Club career ==
=== Roma ===
Born in Latina, Bordin was a youth exponent of Roma.

==== Loan to Ternana ====
On 6 July 2017, Bordin was loaned to Serie B club Ternana with an option to buy. On 16 September, Bordin made his Serie B debut for Ternana as a substitute replacing Andrea Paolucci in the 28th minute of a 3–1 away defeat against Virtus Entella. Four weeks later, on 14 October, he played his first entire match for the club, a 4–2 home win over Spezia. Bordin ended his season-long loan to Ternana with only 6 appearances, including 5 as a starter and playing 2 entire matches, remaining an unused substitute for 35 times during the season between Serie B and Coppa Italia, however Ternana was relegated in Serie C.

==== Loan to Perugia ====
On 17 August 2018, Bordin was signed by Serie B side Perugia on a season-long loan deal. On 30 September he made his debut for Perugia in Serie B as a substitute replacing Raffaele Bianco in the 83rd minute of a 1–1 away draw against Cosenza. On 2 December he played his first match as a starter for Perugia, a 2–1 home win over Pescara, he was replaced by Pasquale Mazzocchi after 81 minutes. Six days later, on 8 December, he played his first entire match, a 0–0 away draw against Lecce. Bordin ended his loan to Perugia with only 5 appearances, including 4 as a starter, remaining a used substitute for 24 matches.

=== Spezia ===
On 31 July 2019, Bordin signed to Serie B club Spezia.

==== Loan to Pistoiese ====
On the same day he was loaned to Serie C club Pistoiese on loan for the entire 2019–20 season. Four weeks later, on 25 August, Bordin made his Serie C debut for Pistoiese in a 2–1 home defeat against AlbinoLeffe, he played the entire match. He became Pistoiese's first-choice early in the season. On 7 December, he was sent-off, for the first time in his career, with a double yellow card in the 84th minute of a 0–0 away draw against Pro Vercelli. Bordin ended his season-long loan to Pistoiese with 19 appearances, including 15 of them as a starter, and making 1 assist.

==== Loan to Casertana ====
On 23 September 2020, Bordin was signed by Serie C side Casertana on a season-long loan deal. Two weeks later, on 7 October, he made his dubut for the club in a 2–2 away draw against Potenza, he played the entire match.

=== Fidelis Andria ===
On 30 August 2021, he signed with Fidelis Andria. In January 2022 he left the club by mutual consensus.

=== Latina ===
On 9 August 2022, Bordin joined his hometown club Latina on a one-year deal. He left the club at the end of the season.

=== Atletico Pontinia ===
In September 2023, Bordin moved to Eccellenza club Atletico Pontinia.

== International career ==
Bordin represented Italy at Under-16, Under-17, Under-18, Under-19 and Under-20 level. On 11 March 2013 he made his U-16 debut in a 2–1 away win over Croatia U-16, he played the entire match. On 10 October 2014 he made his U-17 debut in a 0–0 away draw against Israel U-17. Bordin with Italy U-17 played also a match as a substitute in the 2014 UEFA European Under-17 Championship qualifying round against Moldavia U-17. On 12 August 2015, Bordin made his debut with Italy U-18 in a 0–0 home draw against Bulgaria U-18, he was replaced by Fabio Castellano in the 57th minute. Two months later, on 12 October he scored his first international goal in the 30th minute of a 2–1 home defeat against Poland U-18. One more month later he played his first entire match, a 2–0 away defeat against Austria U-18. On 11 September 2016, Bordin made his U-19 debut as a substitute replacing Edoardo Degl'Innocenti in the 54th minute of a 1–0 home defeat against Croatia U-19. On 27 March 2018 he made his U-20 debut as a substitute replacing Giulio Maggiore in the 72nd minute of a 3–2 home defeat against Switzerland U-19 in the 2017–18 Under 20 Elite League. One month later, on 25 April he scored his first goal at U-20 level in the 23rd minute of a 3–0 home win over Croatia U-20.

== Career statistics ==
=== Club ===
As of match played 26 September 2021

Club	Season	League			Cup		Europe		Other		Total	
Club	Season	League	Apps	Goals	Apps	Goals	Apps	Goals	Apps	Goals	Apps	Goals
Ternana (loan)	2017–18	Serie B	6	0	0	0	—		—		6	0
Perugia (loan)	2018–19	Serie B	5	0	0	0	—		—		5	0
Pistoiese (loan)	2019–20	Serie C	19	0	0	0	—		—		19	0
Casertana (loan)	2020–21	Serie C	15	0	0	0	—		1 (Note: Appearance(s) in Promotion Playoffs)	0	16	0
Fidelis Andria	2021–22	Serie C	3	0	0	0	—		—		3	0
Career total			48	0	0	0	—		1	0	49	0

== Honours ==
=== Club ===
Roma Primavera

- Campionato Nazionale Primavera: 2015–16
- Coppa Italia Primavera: 2016–17
- Supercoppa Primavera: 2017
