= Giuseppe Stancampiano =

Italian footballer

Personal information
- Date of birth: 9 January 1987 (age 39)
- Place of birth: Palermo, Italy
- Height: 1.80 m (5 ft 11 in)
- Position: Goalkeeper

Team information
- Current team: Anzio calcio 1924
- Number: 49

Senior career*
Years	Team	Apps	(Gls)
2004–2007	Ferentino	68	(0)
2007–2009	Latina	0	(0)
2009–2010	Caperanese	0	(0)
2011–2012	Boville Ernica	40	(0)
2012–2013	Cadiz B	0	(0)
2013–2014	Chiavari Caperana	33	(0)
2014–2016	Sestri Levante	68	(0)
2016–2017	Imolese	24	(0)
2017–2018	Cuneo	30	(0)
2018–2019	Città Di Anagni	32	(0)
2019–2020	Trapani	1	(0)
2020–2021	Livorno	21	(0)
2021–2022	Catania	11	(0)
2022–2024	Pontedera	18	(0)
2024–	Atletico Lodigiani	7	(0)
- * Club domestic league appearances and goals as of 17 November 2024

Giuseppe Stancampiano (born in Palermo, 9 January 1987) is an Italian footballer who plays as a goalkeeper for Serie D club Atletico Lodigiani.

== Club career ==
On 9 July 2021, he signed a two-year contract with Catania. On 9 April 2022, he was released together with all of his Catania teammates following the club's exclusion from Italian football due to its inability to overcome a number of financial issues.
