= Massimiliano Benucci =

Italian footballer

Personal information
- Date of birth: 10 November 1998 (age 28)
- Place of birth: Cavriglia, Italy
- Height: 1.81 m (5 ft 11 in)
- Position: Midfielder

Team information
- Current team: Sangiovannese

Youth career
- –2017: Arezzo
- 2016–2017: → Grosseto (loan)
- 2017: → Varese (loan)

Senior career*
| Years | Team | Apps | (Gls) |
| 2017–2018 | Arezzo | 17 | (1) |
| 2018–2019 | Empoli | 0 | (0) |
| 2018–2019 | → Arezzo (loan) | 10 | (1) |
| 2019–2021 | Arezzo | 26 | (1) |
| 2021–2022 | Sansovino | | |
| 2022–2023 | Terranuova | 31 | (3) |
| 2023 | Montevarchi | 9 | (1) |
| 2023– | Sangiovannese | 4 | (2) |
- * Club domestic league appearances and goals as of 20 December 2023

Massimiliano Benucci (born 10 November 1998) is an Italian football player who plays as a midfielder for Serie D club Sangiovannese.

== Club career ==
=== Arezzo ===
On 4 October 2017, Benucci made his professional debut, in Serie C, for Arezzo, as a substitute replacing Curtis Yebili in the 87th minute of a 2–1 home win over Pontedera. On 23 December, Benucci played his first match as a starter for Arezzo, a 2–1 away defeat against Arzachena, he was replaced by Eugenio D'Ursi in the 54th minute. On 30 December he scored his first professional goal, as a substitute, in the 84th minute of a 4–2 home win over Giana Erminio. On 10 April 2018 he played his first entire match for Arezzo, a 3–2 away win over Olbia.

=== Empoli ===
On 12 July 2018, he signed with Serie A club Empoli who immediately loaned him back to Arezzo for the 2018–19 season.

=== Arezzo ===
On 21 August 2019, he returned to Arezzo on a permanent basis.

== Career statistics ==
=== Club ===
As of 6 June 2018

| Club | Season | League | | | Cup | | Europe | | Other | | Total | |
| Club | Season | League | Apps | Goals | Apps | Goals | Apps | Goals | Apps | Goals | Apps | Goals |
|---|---|---|---|---|---|---|---|---|---|---|---|---|
| Arezzo | 2017–18 | Serie C | 17 | 1 | 0 | 0 | — | | — | | 17 | 1 |
| Career total | | | 17 | 1 | 0 | 0 | — | | — | | 17 | 1 |
