= FC Rieti =

Italian football club

Rieti
- Full name: Football Club Rieti
- Nicknames: Gli Amarantocelesti (The Claret and Sky Blue)
- Founded: 1936; 90 years ago 1948 (re-founded)
- Ground: Stadio Centro d'Italia – Manlio Scopigno, Rieti, Italy
- Capacity: 9,980
- Owner: Riccardo Curci
- Chairman: Riccardo Curci
- Coach: Bruno Caneo
- League: Promozione Lazio Group B
- 2022–23: Prima Categoria Lazio Group B, 2nd of 15 (promoted)
- Website: http://www.rieticalcio.it/
Home colours	Away colours	Third colours

Football Club Rieti, commonly known as FC Rieti or simply Rieti, is an Italian association football club, based in Rieti, Lazio. The club compete in Eccellenza, the fifth tier of Italian football, playing home matches at the Stadio Centro d'Italia – Manlio Scopigno.

Formed in 1936, the team took the current name in 1996. Its main achievement has been the promotion to Serie B of Southern Italy in 1946.

== History ==
The club was founded in 1936 as Supertessile Rieti and refounded in 1948 as S.S. Rieti and 1996 with the current name.

In the seasons 1946–47 and 1947–48 it played in Serie B South.

In the seasons 2005–06 and 2006–07 it played in Serie C2.

In May 2018, under the presidency of Riccardo Curci, the team was promoted to Serie C. Curci had been looking for buyers since then; at first Greek businessman Manthos Poulinakis bought the team, but some months later withdrew and sold it back to Curci.

After being relegated back to Serie D, Rieti started suffering a number of financial issues, which ultimately led to the club voluntarily withdrawing from the league in July 2022.

== Colors and badge ==
=== Colors ===
The team's colors are amaranth (Italian: amaranto) and sky blue (Italian: celeste).

=== Badge ===
==== Coat of arms ====
In 1989, when the team changed its name to SC Rieti, the crest consisted of a white shield, divided into four by amaranth-blue lines, where four crenellated portals appeared.

In 1996, when the club changed its name to FC Rieti , the crest became simply the city crest accompanied by the words "Football Club Rieti". The crest was modified by inserting the city shield in an oval with an amaranth-blue striped background, with the "FC R" above the city shield and the year of the re-foundation "1996" below it. In 2005, FC Rieti promoted to Serie C2, the year "1996" was replaced with "2005" to memorial the promotion.

The city's coat of arms, used as the team's logo around the 1990s

== Stadium ==
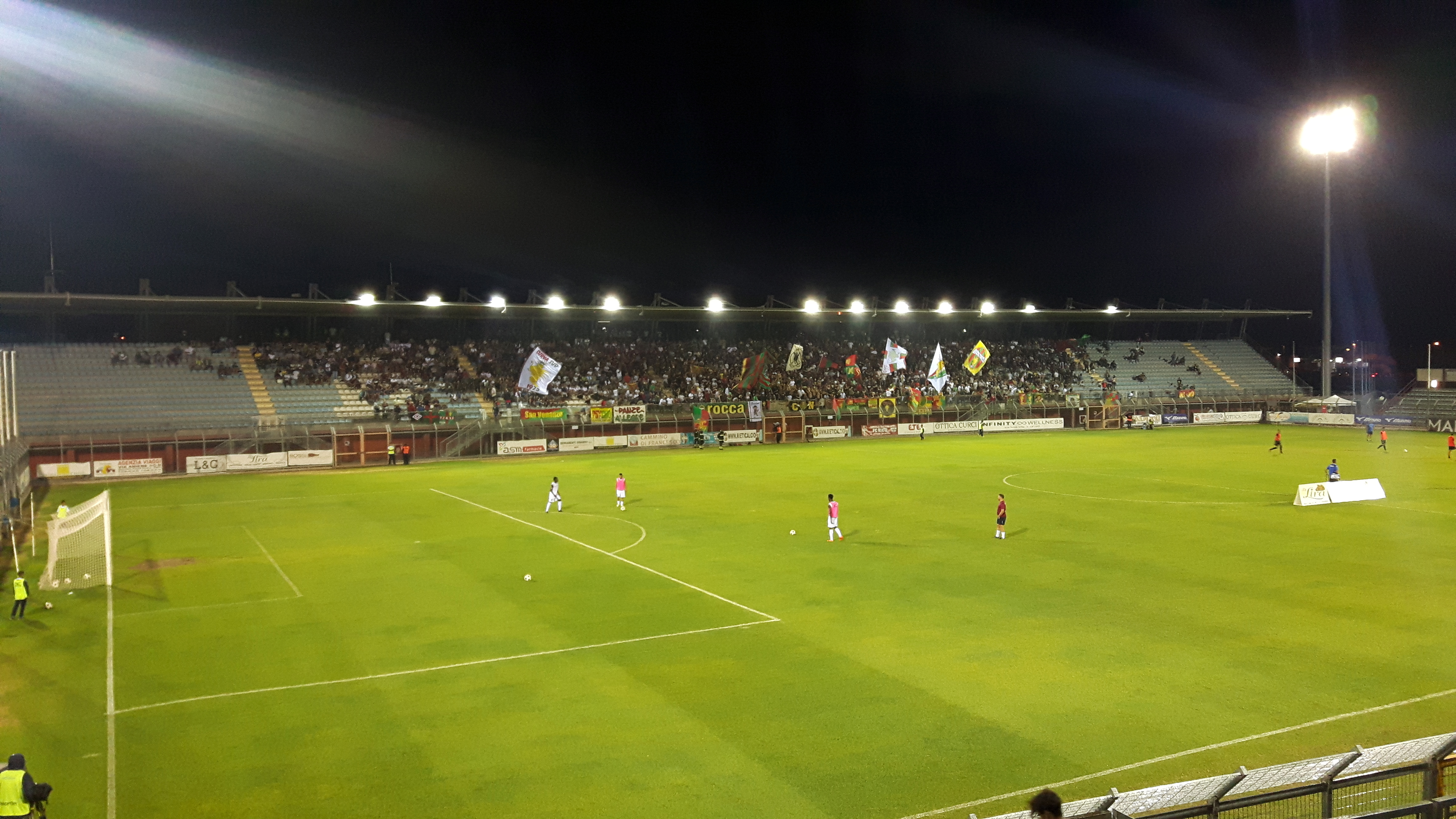
The Centro d'Italia-Manlio Scopigno stadium

Since its foundation, Rieti played their home matches in the Fulvio Iacoboni Stadium for 60 years.

In the 90s, the old stadium was replaced by a newer, the Centro d'Italia-Manlio Scopigno stadium.

== Honours ==
- Regional Coppa Italia Lazio:
  - Winners 1: 2011–12
