= Schuster =

Schuster is a German surname meaning 'shoemaker', 'cobbler'. It is sometimes spelled Shuster. Other spelling variants of the name include Schuester, Šustr and Šuštar. Notable people with the surname include:

== Arts and entertainment ==
- Augusto Schuster (born 1992), Chilean actor, singer, dancer and model
- David Michael Schuster (born 1952), American opera singer
- Frank Schuster (music patron) (1852–1927), British patron of the arts
- Ida Schuster (1918–2020), Scottish actress
- Ira Schuster (1889–1946), American songwriter
- Joseph Schuster (cellist) (1903–1969), Russian-Jewish cellist
- Joseph Schuster (composer) (1748–1812), German composer
- Leon Schuster (born 1951), South African filmmaker, singer and radio presenter
- Michaela Schuster, German opera singer

== Science and academia ==
- Arthur Schuster (1851–1934), German-born British physicist
- David Israel Schuster (born 1935), American chemist
- Gary Schuster (born 1946), American chemist
- Guido Schuster, Swiss computer scientist
- Hans-Emil Schuster (born 1934), German astronomer
- Josef Schuster (born 1954), Israeli-born German medical doctor
- Norah Schuster (1892–1991), British pathologist
- Peter Schuster (theoretical chemist) (born 1941), Austrian theoretical chemist
- Robert Schuster (rubber scientist) (born 1942), German rubber industry scientist
- Rose Schuster Taylor (1863–1951), American writer and naturalist
- Sheldon Schuster (born 1947), American biochemist
- Shlomit C. Schuster (1951–2016), Israeli philosophical counselor
- Stefan Schuster (born 1961), German biophysicist
- Tanja Schuster, Austrian taxonomist
- Theodor Schuster (1808–1872), German jurist and medical doctor
- Wilhelm Schuster (1880–1942), German pastor and naturalist

== Sport ==
- Bernd Schuster (born 1959), German football player and manager
- Bill Schuster (1912–1987), American baseball player
- Curtis Schuster (born 1968), American Thai boxer
- Dirk Schuster (born 1967), German football player and manager
- Frank Schuster (footballer) (born 1955), German footballer
- Fred Schuster (born 1948), Samoan rugby player
- George Schuster (driver) (1873–1972), American racing driver
- Hans Schuster (1888–1970), Swedish long-distance runner
- Hector Schuster (1942–2007), New Zealand cricketer
- Jannik Schuster (born 2006), Austrian footballer
- Jérôme Schuster (born 1985), French rugby union player
- Josh Schuster (born 2001), Samoan international rugby league footballer
- Julian Schuster (born 1985), German football manager
- Kaja Schuster (born 2004), Slovenian judoka
- Mirko Schuster (born 1994), German footballer
- Norman Schuster (born 1979), German boxer
- Patrick Schuster (born 1990), American baseball pitcher
- Peter Schuster (rugby union), Samoan-New Zealand rugby union player and administrator
- Schuster (Portuguese footballer) (born 1978), Portuguese footballer
- Susanne Schuster (born 1963), German swimmer
- Werner Schuster (sportsman) (born 1969), Austrian ski jumping coach

== Other ==
- Albert Hugo Schuster (1912–1973), Nazi war criminal
- Alfredo Ildefonso Schuster (1880–1954), Italian cardinal and Archbishop of Milan
- Alon Schuster (born 1957), Israeli politician
- Armin Schuster (born 1961), German politician
- Arnold Schuster (1927–1952), American businessman
- Assaf Schuster (born 1958), Israeli entrepreneur and professor of computer science
- Claud Schuster (1869–1956), British civil servant
- Eugenia Schuster (1865–1946), American community activist
- Felix Schuster (1854–1936), 1st Baronet and British banker
- Frank R. Schuster (born 1971), American Roman Catholic prelate
- Franz Schuster (1904–1943), Austrian member of the resistance
- George Ernest Schuster (1881–1982), British colonial administrator and politician
- Karlgeorg Schuster (1886–1973), German naval officer
- Lefau Harry Schuster, Samoan Minister of Police and Prisons
- M. Lincoln Schuster (1897–1970), American book publisher
- Marina Schuster (born 1975), German politician
- Rudolf Schuster (born 1934), Slovak president in 1999–2004
- Toeolesulusulu Cedric Schuster, Samoean environmentalist and politician
- Werner Schuster (politician) (1939–2001), German politician
- Wolfgang Schuster (born 1949), German politician

== See also ==
- Dimitrius Schuster-Koloamatangi (born 2001), New Zealand actor
- JuJu Smith-Schuster (born 1996) American football wide receiver
- Benjamin and Marian Schuster Performing Arts Center
- Simon & Schuster, New York publishing house
