= List of Italian football transfers winter 2017–18 =

This is a list of Italian football transfers featuring at least one Serie A or Serie B club which were completed in the winter of the 2017–18 season. The winter transfer window opened on 3 January 2018, although a few transfers were made official prior to that date. The window closed at midnight on 31 January 2018. Free agents could join a club at any time, either during or in between transfer windows, as long as the team registered them.

== Transfers ==
Legend

- Those clubs in Italic indicate that the player already left the team on loan this season or new signing that immediately left the club.

Date	Name	Moving from	Moving to	Fee
19 December 2017	(Norway) Vajebah Sakor	Juventus	(Sweden) Göteborg	Undisclosed (Note: The player already played for his new club in 2017–18 season, the deal turned from temporary to definitive.)
19 December 2017	Giuseppe Rossi	Unattached	Genoa	Free
29 December 2017	(Brazil) Gilberto	Fiorentina	(Brazil) Fluminense	12-month loan
3 January 2018	Simone Salviato	Cremonese	Padova	Free
3 January 2018	Mirko Pigliacelli	Pescara	Pro Vercelli	Loan
3 January 2018	(Brazil) Gladestony	Unattached	Pro Vercelli	Free
4 January 2018	(Ghana) Nii Nortey Ashong	Unattached	Benevento	Free
4 January 2018	(Montenegro) Ognjen Stijepovic	(Montenegro) Mladost Podgorica	Sampdoria	Loan
5 January 2018	Emanuele Gatto	Chievo	Alessandria	Undisclosed
5 January 2018	(Slovenia) Jure Balkovec	(Slovenia) Domžale	Bari	Undisclosed
5 January 2018	(France) Jean-Claude Billong	(Slovenia) Maribor	Benevento	Undisclosed
5 January 2018	(Croatia) Marko Pjaca	Juventus	(Germany) Schalke 04	Loan
6 January 2018	(Mali) Aly Mallé	Udinese	(Spain) Lorca	Loan
6 January 2018	(Slovenia) Andrej Kotnik	Crotone	(Spain) Formentera	Loan
8 January 2018	(Brazil) Raphael Martinho	Bari	Ascoli	Undisclosed
8 January 2018	Federico Melchiorri	Cagliari	Carpi	Loan
8 January 2018	Leandro Greco	Bari	Foggia	Loan
8 January 2018	Marco Zambelli	Unattached	Foggia	Free
8 January 2018	(Sweden) Melker Hallberg	Udinese	(Sweden) Kalmar	Loan
8 January 2018	(Uruguay) Martín Cáceres	Hellas Verona	Lazio	Undisclosed
8 January 2018	Matteo Rossini	Matelica	Sassuolo	End of Loan
8 January 2018	Michele Portoghese	Bari	Taranto	Loan
9 January 2018	Samuele Perisan	Udinese	Arezzo	Loan
9 January 2018	Simone Ganz	Pescara	Ascoli	Undisclosed
9 January 2018	Matteo Liviero	Unattached	Cittadella	Free
9 January 2018	Davide Cinaglia	Ascoli	Cremonese	Undisclosed
9 January 2018	(Slovenia) Nino Kukovec	(Slovenia) Maribor	Fiorentina	Loan
9 January 2018	Denis Tonucci	Bari	Foggia	Undisclosed
9 January 2018	(Belgium) Corentin Fiore	(Belgium) Standard Liège	Palermo	Undisclosed
9 January 2018	(Netherlands) Alessio Da Cruz	Novara	Parma	Undisclosed
9 January 2018	Luca Germoni	Lazio	Perugia	Loan
9 January 2018	Simone Palombi	Lazio	Salernitana	Loan
9 January 2018	Riccardo Cappa	Roma	Sassuolo	Undisclosed
10 January 2018	Loris Zonta	Inter	Bassano Virtus	Undisclosed
10 January 2018	Nicolò Bruschi	Sassuolo	Cuneo	Loan
10 January 2018	Tommaso Nobile	Pro Vercelli	Fano	Loan
10 January 2018	Matteo Manfroni	Juventus	Lucchese	Loan
10 January 2018	Leonardo Lucchesi	Lucchese	Pro Vercelli	Loan
10 January 2018	Alberto Marini	Prato	Sassuolo	Loan
10 January 2018	Federico Piovaccari	(China) Zhejiang Yiteng	Ternana	Undisclosed
10 January 2018	Michele Rigione	Chievo	Ternana	Loan
10 January 2018	Marco Firenze	Crotone	Venezia	Loan
10 January 2018	(Ghana) Carlos Buxton Opoku	Paganese	Hellas Verona	Loan return
10 January 2018	(Brazil) Ryder Matos	Udinese	Hellas Verona	Loan
10 January 2018	Leonardo Gatto	Salernitana	Virtus Entella	Undisclosed
10 January 2018	Vittorio Antonino	Pescara	Unattached	Released
11 January 2018	(Greece) Marios Oikonomou	Bologna	Bari	Loan
11 January 2018	(Austria) Denis Omic	Roma	(Austria) Blau-Weiß Linz	Loan
11 January 2018	Daniele Borra	Virtus Entella	Carrarese	Loan
11 January 2018	Giuseppe Caccavallo	Venezia	Catania	Loan
11 January 2018	Simone Emmanuello	Atalanta	Cesena	Loan
11 January 2018	Emanuele Suagher	Atalanta	Cesena	18-month loan
11 January 2018	Marco Capuano	Cagliari	Crotone	Loan
11 January 2018	(France) Zinédine Machach	Unattached	Napoli	Free
11 January 2018	Stefano Moreo	Venezia	Palermo	Loan
11 January 2018	Antonio Junior Vacca	Foggia	Parma	Undisclosed
11 January 2018	Gennaro Armeno	Novara	Reggina	Loan
11 January 2018	(Slovenia) Jasmin Kurtić	Atalanta	SPAL	Loan
11 January 2018	Leonardo Candellone	Torino	Südtirol	Loan
11 January 2018	Francesco Corapi	Parma	Trapani	Undisclosed
11 January 2018	(Croatia) Bruno Petković	Bologna	Hellas Verona	Loan
12 January 2018	(Brazil) Leandro Castán	Roma	Cagliari	Loan
12 January 2018	Luigi Scaglia	Parma	Foggia	Loan
12 January 2018	Luigi Luciani	Venezia	Gavorrano	Loan
12 January 2018	Alberto Cotticelli	Benevento	(Malta) Sliema Wanderers	Loan
12 January 2018	(Ghana) Nii Nortey Ashong	Benevento	(Malta) Sliema Wanderers	Undisclosed
12 January 2018	Leonardo Taurino	Ternana	Fidelis Andria	Loan
13 January 2018	Luca Rizzo	Bologna	Atalanta	Loan
13 January 2018	(Brazil) Alan Empereur	Foggia	Bari	Loan
13 January 2018	Wladimiro Falcone	Sampdoria	Gavorrano	Loan
13 January 2018	Luca Vignali	Spezia	Reggiana	Loan
13 January 2018	(Poland) Thiago Cionek	Palermo	SPAL	Undisclosed
13 January 2018	(Senegal) Boukary Dramé	Atalanta	SPAL	Undisclosed
13 January 2018	(Mali) Cheick Diabaté	(Turkey) Osmanlıspor	Benevento	Loan
14 January 2018	Simone Moschin	Pro Vercelli	Cuneo	Loan
15 January 2018	(Germany) Oliver Kragl	Crotone	Foggia	Loan
15 January 2018	(Ghana) Yussif Raman Chibsah	Benevento	Frosinone	Loan
15 January 2018	(Uruguay) Leandro Cabrera	Crotone	(Spain) Getafe	Loan
15 January 2018	(Argentina) Lisandro López	(Portugal) Benfica	Internazionale	Loan
15 January 2018	Simone Gozzi	Alessandria	Pro Vercelli	Loan
15 January 2018	(Georgia (country)) Irakli Shekiladze	Spezia	Lucchese	Loan
15 January 2018	Raffaele Palladino	Genoa	Spezia	Undisclosed
15 January 2018	Simone Festa	Brescia	Trento	Loan
15 January 2018	Gennaro Acampora	Spezia	Virtus Entella	Loan
15 January 2018	Francesco Bombagi	Ternana	Pordenone	Undisclosed
16 January 2018	(Nigeria) David Okereke	Spezia	Cosenza	Loan
16 January 2018	Emmanuele Cicerelli	Salernitana	Pordenone	Loan
16 January 2018	Youssef Maleh	Cesena	Ravenna	Loan
16 January 2018	Manuel De Luca	Torino	Renate	Loan
16 January 2018	Giuseppe Statella	Cosenza	Ternana	Undisclosed
16 January 2018	Alberto Picchi	Empoli	Pistoiese	Loan
16 January 2018	(Belgium) Reno Wilmots	(Belgium) Roeselare	Avellino	Undisclosed
16 January 2018	(Romania) Ianis Hagi	Fiorentina	(Romania) Viitorul Constanța	Undisclosed
16 January 2018	Paolo Dellafiore	Unattached	Perugia	Free
16 January 2018	Gaetano Monachello	Atalanta	Ascoli	Loan
16 January 2018	Marcello Gazzola	Sassuolo	Parma	Loan
16 January 2018	Giuseppe Scalera	Bari	Fidelis Andria	Loan
17 January 2018	(Guadeloupe) Andreaw Gravillon	Benevento	Pescara	Undisclosed
17 January 2018	(Libya) Ahmad Benali	Pescara	Crotone	Loan
17 January 2018	(Luxembourg) Dany Mota	Virtus Entella	Sassuolo	Loan
17 January 2018	Federico Maracchi	Trapani	Novara	Loan
17 January 2018	(Scotland) Liam Henderson	(Scotland) Celtic	Bari	Undisclosed
17 January 2018	(Montenegro) Stefan Bajic	Cremonese	Triestina	Loan
17 January 2018	(Ivory Coast) Moussa Koné	Cesena	Frosinone	Loan
18 January 2018	Amato Ciciretti	Benevento	Parma	Loan
18 January 2018	(Serbia) Filip Đuričić	Sampdoria	Benevento	Loan
18 January 2018	(Slovakia) Dávid Ivan	Sampdoria	Pro Vercelli	Loan
18 January 2018	Luca Cattaneo	Brescia	Reggiana	Undisclosed
18 January 2018	Gabriel Cleur	Virtus Entella	Siena	Loan
18 January 2018	Carlo De Risio	Padova	Avellino	Undisclosed
18 January 2018	(Montenegro) Cristian Hadžiosmanović	Sampdoria	Reggina	Loan
18 January 2018	Domenico Cuomo	Sampdoria	SPAL	Loan
18 January 2018	Luca Vido	Atalanta	Cittadella	Loan
18 January 2018	Edoardo Sbampato	Chievo	Virtus Francavilla	Loan
19 January 2018	Luca Barlocco	Juventus	Alessandria	Loan
19 January 2018	(Brazil) Sandro	(Turkey) Antalyaspor	Benevento	Loan
19 January 2018	(Brazil) Guilherme	(Poland) Legia Warsaw	Benevento	Free
19 January 2018	Thomas Saloni	Spezia	Virtus Francavilla	Loan
19 January 2018	Angelo Tartaglia	Novara	Fidelis Andria	Loan
19 January 2018	Giuseppe Rizzo	Salernitana	Catania	Loan
19 January 2018	Federico Ricci	Sassuolo	Crotone	Loan
19 January 2018	Michele Rocca	Sampdoria	FeralpiSalò	Loan
19 January 2018	(Venezuela) Andrés Ponce	Sampdoria	FeralpiSalò	Loan
19 January 2018	Nicolò Gigli	Ternana	Matera	Loan
19 January 2018	(Romania) Deian Boldor	Bologna	Verona	Loan
19 January 2018	(Switzerland) Blerim Džemaili	(Canada) Montreal Impact	Bologna	Loan return
19 January 2018	Giuseppe Cuomo	Crotone	Rende	Loan
19 January 2018	Franklyn Akammadu	Cesena	Prato	Loan
19 January 2018	Andrea Ciofi	Roma	Cesena	Undisclosed
19 January 2018	Armando Anastasio	Napoli	Parma	18-month loan
20 January 2018	(Croatia) Mateo Bertoša	Unattached	Pro Vercelli	Free
20 January 2018	(Poland) Paweł Bochniewicz	Udinese	(Poland) Górnik Zabrze	Loan
20 January 2018	(Belgium) Mohamed Soumarè	Avellino	(Luxembourg) Dudelange	Loan
20 January 2018	Edoardo Soleri	Roma	(Spain) Almería	Loan
20 January 2018	(Bosnia and Herzegovina) Riad Bajić	Udinese	(Turkey) İstanbul Başakşehir	Loan
21 January 2018	Gianluca Litteri	Cittadella	Venezia	Loan
22 January 2018	(Greece) Charalambos Lykogiannis	(Austria) Sturm Graz	Cagliari	Undisclosed
22 January 2018	(Colombia) Damir Ceter	(Colombia) Independiente Santa Fe	Cagliari	Undisclosed
22 January 2018	(Brazil) Rafinha	(Spain) Barcelona	Inter	Loan
22 January 2018	Filippo Falco	Bologna	Pescara	Loan
22 January 2018	Giuseppe Borello	Crotone	Torino	Loan
22 January 2018	(Slovakia) Erik Gliha	Avellino	Unattached	Released
23 January 2018	Elio Calderini	Foggia	Viterbese	Loan
23 January 2018	(France) Arthur Yamga	Chievo	Pescara	Loan
23 January 2018	Ferdinando Del Sole	Pescara	Juventus	Loan return
23 January 2018	Alberto De Francesco	Reggina	Spezia	Undisclosed
23 January 2018	(Algeria) Saphir Taïder	Bologna	(Canada) Montreal Impact	2-year loan
23 January 2018	(Slovakia) Nikolas Špalek	(Slovakia) Žilina	Brescia	Undisclosed
23 January 2018	(Brazil) Felipe Curcio	Fidelis Andria	Brescia	Undisclosed
23 January 2018	(Uruguay) Mauricio Lemos	(Spain) Las Palmas	Sassuolo	Loan
23 January 2018	(Serbia) Jagoš Vuković	(Greece) Olympiacos	Verona	Loan
23 January 2018	Arturo Calabresi	Roma	Foggia	Undisclosed
23 January 2018	Davide Mordini	Cesena	Mestre	Loan
24 January 2018	(Latvia) Kristaps Zommers	Parma	Cosenza	Loan
24 January 2018	Matteo Gasperi	Cesena	Fano	Loan
24 January 2018	King Udoh	Juventus	Fano	Loan
24 January 2018	Luca Mora	SPAL	Spezia	Undisclosed
24 January 2018	(Brazil) Ewandro	Udinese	(Portugal) Estoril	Loan
24 January 2018	Marco Imperiale	Catanzaro	Empoli	Undisclosed
24 January 2018	Matteo Brighi	Perugia	Empoli	Free
24 January 2018	(Sweden) Samuel Gustafson	Torino	Perugia	Loan
25 January 2018	(Albania) Naser Aliji	Unattached	Virtus Entella	Free
25 January 2018	Massimiliano Gatto	Chievo	Pro Vercelli	Undisclosed
25 January 2018	Raffaele Alcibiade	FeralpiSalò	Pro Vercelli	Undisclosed
25 January 2018	(Slovenia) Jan Mlakar	Fiorentina	(Slovenia) Maribor	Undisclosed
25 January 2018	Filippo Tiscione	Ternana	Matera	Loan
25 January 2018	Francesco Signori	Venezia	Ternana	Loan
25 January 2018	(Portugal) Iuri Medeiros	(Portugal) Sporting CP	Genoa	18-month loan
26 January 2018	(France) Sofiane Ahmed-Kadi	Salernitana	Alessandria	Loan
26 January 2018	Francesco Giorno	Parma	Vicenza	Loan
26 January 2018	(Senegal) Moustapha Seck	Roma	Novara	Loan
26 January 2018	(Bosnia and Herzegovina) Andrej Modić	Milan	(Bosnia and Herzegovina) Željezničar	Undisclosed
26 January 2018	Jacopo Manconi	Novara	Livorno	Loan
26 January 2018	(Portugal) João Mário	Inter	(England) West Ham	Loan
26 January 2018	(Argentina) Tiago Casasola	Alessandria	Salernitana	Undisclosed
26 January 2018	Francesco Zampano	Pescara	Udinese	Loan
26 January 2018	Matthias Solerio	Avellino	AlbinoLeffe	Loan
27 January 2018	(Bosnia and Herzegovina) Mihael Modic	Rende	Milan	End of loan
27 January 2018	(Nigeria) Umar Sadiq	Roma	(Netherlands) NAC Breda	Loan
27 January 2018	Nicola Leali	Juventus	Perugia	Loan
29 January 2018	Daniele Ragatzu	Olbia	Cagliari	Undisclosed
29 January 2018	Daniele Ragatzu	Cagliari	Olbia	18-month loan
29 January 2018	(North Korea) Choe Song-Hyok	Perugia	Olbia	Loan
29 January 2018	(Argentina) Santiago Morero	Juve Stabia	Avellino	Undisclosed
30 January 2018	Riccardo Ragni	Ascoli	Alessandria	Undisclosed
30 January 2018	Michael Agazzi	Alessandria	Ascoli	Undisclosed
30 January 2018	(Brazil) Emerson Palmieri	Roma	(England) Chelsea	€20+9M
30 January 2018	(Uruguay) Alejandro González	Verona	Perugia	Loan
30 January 2018	Andrea Bianchimano	Reggina	Perugia	Undisclosed
30 January 2018	Andrea Bianchimano	Perugia	Reggina	Loan
30 January 2018	(France) Bryan Dabo	(France) Saint-Étienne	Fiorentina	Undisclosed
30 January 2018	(Belgium) Zinho Vanheusden	Inter	(Belgium) Standard Liège	Loan
30 January 2018	(Argentina) Nehuén Paz	(Argentina) Newell's Old Boys	Bologna	Undisclosed
30 January 2018	(Morocco) Nabil Jaadi	Udinese	(Greece) Asteras Tripolis	Loan
30 January 2018	(Brazil) Gabriel	Milan	Empoli	Loan
30 January 2018	(Argentina) Bruno Zuculini	Verona	(Argentina) River Plate	Loan
30 January 2018	Nicolò Casale	Verona	Prato	Loan
30 January 2018	(Sweden) Oscar Hiljemark	Panathinaikos	Genoa	Loan
30 January 2018	(Netherlands) Andries Noppert	(Netherlands) NAC Breda	Foggia	Undisclosed
30 January 2018	Lorenzo Babbi	Cesena	Atalanta	Undisclosed
30 January 2018	Lorenzo Babbi	Atalanta	Cesena	Loan
30 January 2018	Riccardo Fiamozzi	Genoa	Pescara	Loan
31 January 2018	Francesco Bonfiglio	Palermo	AlbinoLeffe	Loan
31 January 2018	Agostino Camigliano	Cittadella	Cosenza	Loan
31 January 2018	Giuseppe Carriero	Casertana	Parma	Undisclosed
31 January 2018	Mirco Severini	Cesena	Juve Stabia	Loan
31 January 2018	(Croatia) Ricardo Bagadur	Brescia	FeralpiSalò	Loan
31 January 2018	Davide Costa	Inter	Bassano Virtus	Loan
31 January 2018	Luigi Liguori	Napoli	Fidelis Andria	Loan
31 January 2018	(Ghana) Ransford Selasi	Pescara	Lecce	Loan
31 January 2018	Andrea Dossena	Atalanta	Siena	Loan
31 January 2018	(Uruguay) Juan Ramos	Parma	Cosenza	Loan
31 January 2018	(Nigeria) Abdullahi Nura	Roma	Perugia	18-month loan
31 January 2018	(Mexico) Héctor Moreno	Roma	(Spain) Real Sociedad	€6M
31 January 2018	(Senegal) Falou Samb	Genoa	Reggina	Loan
31 January 2018	(Liechtenstein) Yanik Frick	Perugia	Livorno	Undisclosed
31 January 2018	(Ecuador) Bryan Cabezas	Atalanta	Avellino	Loan
31 January 2018	Fabrizio Caligara	Juventus	Cagliari	Undisclosed
31 January 2018	(Colombia) Carlos Sánchez	Fiorentina	(Spain) Espanyol	Loan
31 January 2018	Salvatore Monaco	Perugia	Salernitana	Loan
31 January 2018	(North Korea) Han Kwang-song	Perugia	Cagliari	Loan return
31 January 2018	(Senegal) Khouma Babacar	Fiorentina	Sassuolo	Loan
31 January 2018	Giangiacomo Magnani	Siracusa	Perugia	Undisclosed
31 January 2018	(Serbia) Petar Mićin	(Serbia) Čukarički	Chievo	Loan
31 January 2018	(Serbia) Strahinja Tanasijević	(Serbia) Rad	Chievo	Loan
31 January 2018	Emanuele Giaccherini	Napoli	Chievo	Loan
31 January 2018	Diego Falcinelli	Sassuolo	Fiorentina	Loan
31 January 2018	Federico Mattiello	Juventus	Atalanta	€2,5M
31 January 2018	Federico Mattiello	Atalanta	S.P.A.L.	Loan
31 January 2018	Tommaso Costantini	S.P.A.L.	Ravenna	Loan
31 January 2018	(France) Nicolas Frey	Chievo	Venezia	Loan
31 January 2018	(Spain) Alejandro Rodríguez	Chievo	Empoli	Loan
31 January 2018	Luca Garritano	Chievo	Carpi	Loan
31 January 2018	Riccardo Orsolini	Juventus	Bologna	18-month loan
31 January 2018	(Spain) Pol Lirola	Juventus	Sassuolo	€7M
31 January 2018	(England) Rolando Aarons	(England) Newcastle	Verona	Loan
31 January 2018	Giampaolo Pazzini	Verona	(Spain) Levante	Loan
31 January 2018	Tommaso Coletti	Foggia	Triestina	Undisclosed
31 January 2018	(Japan) Yuto Nagatomo	Inter	(Turkey) Galatasaray	Loan
31 January 2018	(Australia) Chris Ikonomidis	Lazio	(Australia) Western Sydney Wanderers	Loan
31 January 2018	(Spain) Mamadou Tounkara	Lazio	(Albania) Flamurtari	Loan
31 January 2018	(Albania) Progon Maloku	(Germany) Bayern Munich	Lazio	Undisclosed
31 January 2018	(Brazil) Daniel Bessa	Verona	Genoa	Loan
31 January 2018	(Senegal) Adama Sane	Juventus	Verona	Loan return
31 January 2018	Andrea Badan	Verona	AlbinoLeffe	Loan
31 January 2018	Nicolò Cherubin	Verona	Ascoli	Loan
31 January 2018	Ernesto Torregrossa	Verona	Brescia	Undisclosed
31 January 2018	(Croatia) Lorenco Šimić	Sampdoria	SPAL	Loan
31 January 2018	Fabrizio Paghera	Avellino	Pro Vercelli	Loan
31 January 2018	Christian Puggioni	Sampdoria	Benevento	Undisclosed
31 January 2018	(Romania) Alin Toșca	(Spain) Real Betis	Benevento	Loan
31 January 2018	(Slovenia) Vid Belec	Benevento	Sampdoria	Loan
31 January 2018	(Guinea-Bissau) Idrissa Camará	Avellino	Akragas	Loan
31 January 2018	(Albania) Armando Vajushi	Pro Vercelli	Avellino	Loan
31 January 2018	(Switzerland) Matteo Fedele	Foggia	Cesena	Undisclosed
31 January 2018	Cristian Bunino	Juventus	Pescara	Undisclosed
31 January 2018	Leonardo Mancuso	Pescara	Juventus	Undisclosed
31 January 2018	Leonardo Mancuso	Juventus	Pescara	18-month loan
31 January 2018	Fabio Morselli	Juventus	Pescara	Undisclosed
31 January 2018	(Senegal) Franck Kanouté	Pescara	Ascoli	Loan
31 January 2018	(Equatorial Guinea) José Machín	Roma	Pescara	Loan
31 January 2018	(Ivory Coast) Emmanuel Latte Lath	Pescara	Atalanta	Loan return
31 January 2018	Luca Forte	Pescara	Monza	Loan
31 January 2018	Lorenzo Paolucci	Pescara	Monopoli	Loan
31 January 2018	Gianluca Scamacca	Sassuolo	Cremonese	Loan
31 January 2018	Giovanni Sbrissa	Sassuolo	Cremonese	Loan
31 January 2018	Andrea Cisco	Padova	Sassuolo	Undisclosed
31 January 2018	Andrea Cisco	Sassuolo	Padova	Loan
31 January 2018	Alessandro Tripaldelli	Juventus	Sassuolo	Undisclosed
31 January 2018	Alessandro Tripaldelli	Sassuolo	Juventus	Loan
31 January 2018	Michele Cremonesi	S.P.A.L.	Virtus Entella	Loan
31 January 2018	Domenico Maietta	Bologna	Empoli	Undisclosed
31 January 2018	Simone Romagnoli	Empoli	Bologna	Loan
31 January 2018	(Argentina) Lucas Boyé	Torino	(Spain) Celta de Vigo	Loan
31 January 2018	(Nigeria) Orji Okwonkwo	Bologna	Brescia	Loan
31 January 2018	(Greece) Dimitris Konstantinidis	(Greece) PAOK	Brescia	Undisclosed
31 January 2018	(Chile) Thomas Rodríguez	Genoa	(Portugal) Vitória de Setúbal	Loan
31 January 2018	(Argentina) Federico Andrada	(Argentina) River Plate	Bari	Undisclosed
1 February 2018	(Netherlands) Gregory van der Wiel	Cagliari	(Canada) Toronto	Loan
1 February 2018	(Croatia) Franjo Prce	Lazio	(Croatia) Istra	Loan
1 February 2018	(Hungary) Krisztián Adorján	Novara	(Republic of Ireland) Dundalk	Loan
2 February 2018	Andrea Rossi	Pescara	Teramo	Free
3 February 2018	(France) Bacary Sagna	Unattached	Benevento	Free
4 February 2018	(Argentina) Nehuén Paz	Bologna	(Argentina) Lanús	Loan
5 February 2018	Cosimo Chiricò	Unattached	Cesena	Free
12 February 2018	(Ivory Coast) Jean-Daniel Akpa Akpro	Unattached	Salernitana	Free
13 February 2018	(Albania) Azdren Llullaku	Unattached	Virtus Entella	Free
17 February 2018	Alessandro Diamanti	Unattached	Perugia	Free
23 February 2018	(Croatia) Hrvoje Milić	Unattached	Napoli	Free
23 February 2018	Paolo Baiocco	Unattached	Pescara	Free
27 February 2018	(Croatia) Hrvoje Miličević	Pescara	(Kazakhstan) Aktobe	Free
27 February 2018	(Poland) Petar Brlek	Genoa	(Poland) Wisła Kraków	Loan
28 February 2018	(Brazil) Maurício	Lazio	(Poland) Legia Warsaw	Loan
1 March 2018	Angelo Casadei	Unattached	Avellino	Free
