= Mohamed Abousalem =

KGI president

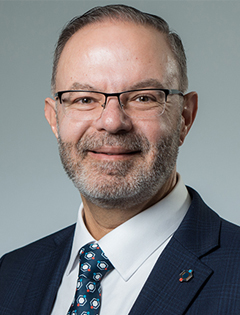

3rd President of Keck Graduate Institute
- Incumbent
- Assumed office July 1, 2024
- Preceded by: Sheldon Schuster

Personal details
- Education: Alexandria University (BS) University of Calgary (MS,PhD) Santa Clara University (MBA)
- Website: Office of the President

Mohamed Abousalem is an Egyptian engineer who has been the 3rd president of the Keck Graduate Institute since 2024. He previously was the Vice President for Research and Innovation and as President of the Board of Directors of the SJSU Research Foundation at San José State University from 2019 to 2024.

== Early life and education ==
Abousalem was born in Alexandria, Egypt, and went to school at Victoria College. He earned a B.S. in civil engineering from the Faculty of Engineering at Alexandria University before moving to Canada, where he received an M.S. and Ph.D. in geomatics engineering from the University of Calgary. Abousalem also holds an M.B.A. from Santa Clara University.

== Career ==
In 1993, Abousalem began his career as a geomatics engineer at Pulsearch Navigation. In 1996, Abousalem joined NCS International as a senior geomatics engineer before moving to Position Inc. in 1997 to serve as manager of research and development. Abousalem joined Magellan Corporation in 1998 and held several positions, including Senior Director of OEM Solutions.

In 2007, Abousalem became Vice President of Marketing and Business Development at Hemisphere GPS and also held the role of Vice President of Corporate Development and Human Resources there prior to leaving in 2010. Abousalem joined Tecterra Inc. in 2010 as their Chief Executive Officer, a position he held until 2016.

Abousalem moved into higher education in 2016, joining University of California Santa Cruz as the Assistant Vice Chancellor of Research for Industry Alliances and Technology Commercialization. In 2019, Abousalem became San Jose State University's inaugural Vice President of Research and Innovation. During his tenure at San Jose State University, "he grew the research enterprise from $47 million to $87 million."

In 2022, California Governor Gavin Newsom appointed Abousalem to the Independent Citizens' Oversight Committee of the California Institute for Regenerative Medicine.

On July 1, 2024, Abousalem became the third president of Keck Graduate Institute.

== Publications ==
Abousalem, M. A. (1993). Development of a robust GPS kinetic positioning module for automatic vehicle location and navigation systems (Master's thesis, University of Calgary, Calgary, Canada). Retrieved from https://ucalgary.scholaris.ca. doi:10.11575/PRISM/16447

M. A. Abousalem, J. F. McLellan and E. J. Krakiwsky, "A new technique for quality control in GPS kinematic positioning," Proceedings of 1994 IEEE Position, Location and Navigation Symposium - PLANS'94, Las Vegas, NV, USA, 1994, pp. 621-628, doi: 10.1109/PLANS.1994.303368. https://ieeexplore.ieee.org/abstract/document/303368

M. A. Abousalem and E. J. Krakiwsky, "A quality control approach for GPS-based automatic vehicle location and navigation systems," Proceedings of VNIS '93 - Vehicle Navigation and Information Systems Conference, Ottawa, ON, Canada, 1993, pp. 466-471, doi: 10.1109/VNIS.1993.585673. https://ieeexplore.ieee.org/abstract/document/585673

Abousalem, M. A. (1996). Development and analysis of wide area differential GPS algorithms (Doctoral thesis, University of Calgary, Calgary, Canada). https://ucalgary.scholaris.ca.

Gao, Y., McLellan, J. F., & Abousalem, M. A. (1997). Single-point GPS positioning accuracy using precise GPS data. Australian Surveyor, 42(4), 185–192. https://doi.org/10.1080/00050326.1997.10441821

Farwell, Mark, Caldwell, Doug, Abousalem, Mohamed, "RTK-Based Vehicle Tracking and Unmanned Operation for Agriculture," Proceedings of the 12th International Technical Meeting of the Satellite Division of The Institute of Navigation (ION GPS 1999), Nashville, TN, September 1999, pp. 2047-2054. https://www.ion.org/publications/abstract.cfm?articleID=3362

Haas, Lin, Abousalem, Mohamed, Murphy, James, "The Ashtech G12-HDMA: A Low Cost, High Performance GPS Space Receiver," Proceedings of the 13th International Technical Meeting of the Satellite Division of The Institute of Navigation (ION GPS 2000), Salt Lake City, UT, September 2000, pp. 350-354. https://www.ion.org/publications/abstract.cfm?articleID=1424

Abousalem, Mohamed, et al. "Ashtech® Instant-RTK™: A Revolutionary Solution for Surveying Professionals." 3rd Int. Symp. on Mobile Mapping Technology. 2001. https://sup.xenya.si/sup/info/ashtech/Z-Max/Instant-RTK%20122100.pdf
