= Canadian GeoAlliance =

GeoAlliance Canada was an umbrella organization founded in 2015. The organization addresses sector-wide strategic priorities by pooling the energy and resources of existing Canadian business, non-profit, academia and government organizations in the geomatics sector.

== History ==
GeoAlliance Canada is a new umbrella organization created to help unite the geomatics sector

GeoAlliance Canada was formed by the Canadian Geomatics Community Round Table, a collaborative group of professionals from all fields of geomatics. The group met regularly to consider the challenges that the industry would be facing in the upcoming years, propose solutions and strategies that could help guide the direction of the sector and strengthen it for the years to come. Seven strategy dimensions were used to create the Pan-Canadian Geomatics Strategy document with input from the geospatial community that helped the strategy development process, leading to the formation of GeoAlliance Canada.

This organization appears to be defunct, with the last live website date of July 7, 2020.

== See also ==
- Canadian Institute of Geomatics
- Geomatics Association of Nova Scotia
- Tecterra
