= Henry Riggs =

Henry Riggs may refer to:

- Henry H. Riggs (1875–1943), Christian missionary
- Henry E. Riggs (1935–2015), Silicon Valley entrepreneur, professor of engineering and vice president at Stanford University
