= Mirko =

Mirko (Cyrillic script: Мирко) is a masculine given name of South Slavic origin.

By Slavic etymology, the name is composed of the root mir (meaning peace) and hypocoristic suffix -ko usual in South Slavic languages, which together means "the peaceful one". Mirko is sometimes used as a short, hypocoristic form of Miroslav in some Slavic languages.

The name is widely popular in Serbia, Croatia, Bulgaria, Bosnia and Herzegovina, Montenegro, Slovenia, Italy and Germany. An alternative spelling in Italian and German is Mirco. The nationality of those men with the forename Mirko who are from outside the Slavic region is listed next to the name.

Notable men with the forename Mirko:

- Prince Mirko of Montenegro
- Mirko Alilović, Croatian handball player
- Mirko Bašić Croatian handball player
- Mirko Bellodi, Italian footballer
- Mirko Bogović, Croatian poet and politician
- Mirko Boland, German footballer
- Mirko Bolesan, Italian footballer
- Mirko Bortolotti, Italian race car driver
- Mirko Bröder, Hungarian-Serbian chess player
- Mirko Bunjevčević, Serbian footballer
- Mirko Casper, German footballer
- Mirko Castillo, Peruvian footballer
- Mirko Celestino, Italian racing cyclist
- Mirko Corsano, Italian volleyball player
- Mirko Cvetković Prime Minister of Serbia (2008-2012)
- Mirko Damjanović, Serbian football coach
- Mirko Derenčin, Hungarian-Croatian nobleman and soldier
- Mirko Dickhaut, German association football player and former player
- Mirko Dorner, German-Hungarian cellist, composer and painter
- Mirko Eichhorn, German figure skater
- Mirko Ellis, Swiss-Italian actor
- Mirko Englich, German Greco-Roman wrestler
- Mirko Eramo, Italian footballer
- Mirko Fait, Italian saxophonist and composer
- Mirko Filipović, better known as Mirko Cro Cop, Croatian former professional mixed martial artist, kickboxer and amateur boxer
- Mirko Gashi, Albanian journalist
- Mirko Giansanti, Italian motorcycle road racer
- Mirko Gori, Italian footballer
- Mirko Grabovac, Singaporean footballer
- Mirko Grmek, Croatian and French historian of medicine, writer and scientist
- Mirko Guadalupi, Italian footballer
- Mirko Höfflin, German ice hockey player
- Mirko Hrgović, Bosnian football coach and former player
- Mirko Ilić, Bosnian-born comics artist and graphic designer
- Mirko Ivanić, Montenegrin footballer
- Mirko Ivanovski, Macedonian association footballer
- Mirko Jeličić, Australian soccer player
- Mirko Jović, Serbian politician
- Mirko Jozić, Croatian football manager and player
- Mirko Jurkovic, American football player
- Mirko Kokotović, Croatian footballer
- Mirko Koršič, Yugoslav fencer
- Mirko Kovač (basketball), Serbian basketball player
- Mirko Kovač (writer), Yugoslav writer
- Mirko Kramarić, Croatian footballer
- Mirko Lamantia, Italian footballer
- Mirko Lang, German actor
- Mirko Marić Bosnian professional footballer
- Mirko Marjanović, Prime Minister of Serbia (1994–2000)
- Mirko Martucci, Italian footballer
- Mirko Messner, Austrian slavicist and politician
- Mirko Mihić, Serbian football coach and retired player
- Mirko Mikić, Bosnian handball player
- Mirko Milašević, Montenegrin handball player
- Mirko Mulalić, Slovenian basketball player
- Mirko Müller, German figure skater
- Mirko Murovic, Canadian ice hockey player
- Mirko Giacomo Nenzi, Italian speed skater
- Mirko Nišović, Serbian sprint canoeist
- Mirko Norac Kevo, Croatian general of the Croatian army
- Mirko Novosel, Croatian basketball player and coach
- Mirko Oremuš, Croatian footballer
- Mirko Paetzold, German bobsledder
- Mirko Palazzi, Sammarinese footballer
- Mirko Petrović (athlete), Serbian athlete
- Mirko Petrović (politician), Serbian politician
- Mirko Petrović-Njegoš, Montenegrin military commander, politician and poet
- Mirko Pieri, Italian footballer
- Mirko Pigliacelli, Italian footballer
- Mirko Plantić, Croatian footballer
- Mirko Puzović, Yugoslav boxer
- Mirko Rački, Croatian painter
- Mirko Radovanović, Serbian footballer
- Mirko Radović, Montenegrin handball player
- Mirko Raičević, Montenegrin football player
- Mirko Salvi, Swiss association football player
- Mirko Sandić, Serbian water polo player
- Mirko Šarović Bosnian politician
- Mirko Savini, Italian footballer
- Mirko Savone, Italian voice-over actor
- Mirko Schuster, German association football player
- Mirko Selak, Croatian footballer
- Mirko and Stjepan Seljan, Croatian explorers
- Mirko Selvaggi, Italian road bicycle racer
- Mirko Serrano, Chilean footballer
- Mirko Slomka, German football manager
- Mirko Spada, Swiss decathlete
- Mirko Stangalino, Italian ski mountaineer
- Mirko Stojanović, Croatian footballer
- Mirko Szewczuk, German cartoonist
- Mirko Taccola, Italian footballer
- Mirko Tedeschi (cyclist, born 1987), Italian cyclist
- Mirko Tedeschi (cyclist, born 1989), Italian cyclist
- Mirko Teodorović, Serbian footballer
- Mirko Tomassoni, Sammarinese politician
- Mirko Tomianovic, Bolivian footballer
- Mirko Tremaglia, Italian politician
- Mirko Trosino, Italian racing cyclist
- Mirko Turri, Italian bobsledder
- Mirko Valdifiori, Italian association football player
- Mirko Vičević, Montenegrin water polo player
- Mirko Vidaković, Croatian biologist
- Mirko Vidović, Croatian writer
- Mirko Vindiš, Slovenian athletics competitor
- Mirko Virius, Croatian painter
- Mirko Vučinić, Montenegrin footballer
- Mirko Vuillermin, Italian short track speed skater
- Mirko Wolter, German speedway rider

== See also ==
- Mirco
- Mirković
- Slavic names
