= Šustr =

Šustr (feminine: Šustrová) is a Czech surname, a Czechised form of the German surname Schuster. Notable people with the surname include:

- Andrej Šustr (born 1990), Czech ice hockey player
- Martin Šustr (1990–2022), Czech footballer
- Petruška Šustrová (1947–2023), Czech dissident, journalist and translator
- Vratislav Šustr (born 1959), Czech cyclist

== See also ==
- Shuster
