= Mirco =

Mirco is a masculine given name popular in Italy, an alternative spelling of the name Mirko. It may refer to:

- Mirco Antenucci (born 1984), Italian footballer
- Mirco Baldacci (born 1977), rally driver from San Marino
- Mirco Bergamasco (born 1983), Italian rugby player
- Mirco Bertolina (born 1991), Italian cross-country skier
- Mirco Born (born 1994), German footballer
- Mirco Colina (born 1990), Curaçaoan footballer
- Mirco Demuro (born 1979), Italian jockey based in Japan
- Mirco Di Tora (born 1986), Italian swimmer
- Mirco Gasparetto (born 1980), Italian footballer
- Mirco Gennari (born 1966), Sammarinese footballer
- Mirco Gualdi (born 1968), Italian racing cyclist
- Mirco Lorenzetto (born 1981), Italian racing cyclist
- Mirco Lüdemann (born 1973), German ice hockey player
- Mirco Maestri (born 1991), Italian cyclist
- Mirco Mezzanotte (born 1974), Italian ski mountaineer
- Mirco Miori (born 1995), Italian footballer
- Mirco Müller (born 1995), Swiss ice hockey player
- Mirco Poloni (born 1974), Italian footballer
- Mirco Pruyser (born 1989), Dutch field hockey player
- Mirco Reseg (born 1972), German actor and comedian
- Mirco Ruggiero (born 1969), Italian bobsledder
- Mirco Sadotti (born 1975), Italian professional footballer
- Mirco Scarantino (born 1995), Italian weightlifter
- Mirco Severini (born 1997), Italian footballer
- Mirco Spighi (born 1990), Italian footballer
- Mirco Zuliani (born 1953), Italian Air Force officer

== See also ==
- Jesse Mirco (born 1997), Australian player of Canadian football
- Mirko
- Mirco Games, a pinball and arcade game manufacturer from Phoenix, Arizona that existed from 1969 to 1978
