= Geomatics Association of Nova Scotia =

The Geomatics Association of Nova Scotia (GANS) is a non-profit association to promote the geomatics industry in Nova Scotia.

== Background ==
The Geomatics Association of Nova Scotia, also known as GANS, was incorporated in 1990 as a non-profit association with the mission to promote the further development of the Nova Scotia geomatics industry, making it competitive both domestically and internationally, and increasing its material contribution to the provincial economy.

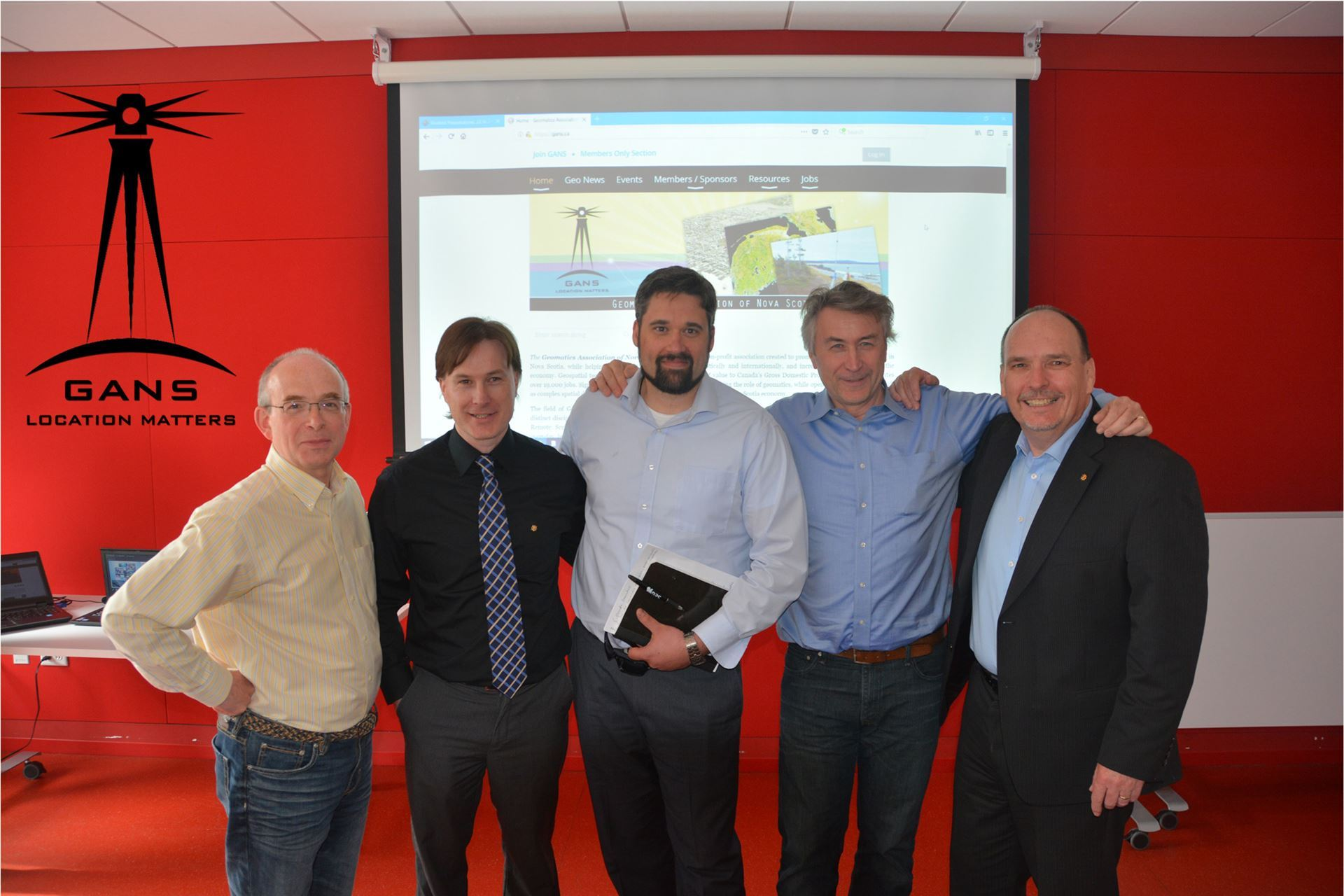
Geomatics Association of Nova Scotia Presidents 2012 to 2018

Through a collaboration among a broad membership representing academia, all levels of government, and private industry, GANS provides both professional and social events, networking opportunities, a mentoring program, geospatial job postings and professional development. The number of members in the regional association fluctuates from year to year but is typical around 250.

"The Geomatics Association of Nova Scotia (GANS) has a special interest in mapping in Nova Scotia. We are an organization whose sole purpose is to promote the science and application of geomatics ('mapping') in Nova Scotia."

GANS was one of the founding members of Canadian GeoAlliance, an umbrella organization created to address sector-wide strategic priorities in the geomatics sector.

=== GANS logo ===
In 2012 GANS went through a creative re-branding process that forced the association's Board of Directors to revisit the objectives of the association and helped identify challenges that were not previously being addressed. It also enabled the board to model a brand around those challenges in an effort to tackle them head on. An example of this was attracting students and young professionals to the Association; therefore an attempt was made to ensure to design a brand that is youthful, fresh, compelling, and easily understood.

GANS chose to model their brand around the concept of a 'lighthouse'. The GANS lighthouse provides guidance and is a beacon for everyone interested in geomatics in Nova Scotia. It is symbolic of the association's maritime roots and represents both a survey tripod and a compass, measuring the shape of the Earth and surveying everything on top. The top of the lighthouse is meant to resemble a total station. The radiating light symbolizes the arms of a compass rose, portraying the notion of direction.

The light itself is representative of knowledge and the Association's long history in promoting the geomatics industry in Nova Scotia. Therefore, the GANS 'Lighthouse' logo is distinct and memorable.

=== Geography Helped Me Get Where I am Now ===
Since 2015, GANS has been producing customized geography posters for Nova Scotia high schools to help promote geospatial careers and the study of geography. The unique posters are sent to high school geography classrooms throughout Nova Scotia. Each poster features a past student from that school who now works in a geomatics-related discipline. The poster includes details of their education, present career title and employer.

To date GANS has produced over 20 posters, with the goal of having over 100 unique posters in schools all across Nova Scotia by 2020.

== See also ==
- Canadian GeoAlliance
- Canadian Institute of Geomatics
