= Alexei Vranich =

American anthropologist

Alexei Vranich (/ˈvrænɪtʃ/ VRAN-itch; born July 15, 1968) is an American archaeologist specializing in the pre-Columbian South America. His current position as a professor at the University of Warsaw. He is currently based at the Center for Andean Studies at the University of Warsaw. The project focuses on the origins and composition of the Inca Empire. His previous positions include visiting professor at the University of Warsaw, Poland (2021–22), Lecturer at the Department of Material Sciences at MIT (2021–22), Research Associate, and Assistant Dean at Bowles Hall Residential College (2016–18) at the University of California, Berkeley, Research Associate and Visiting Assistant Professor (2009–2015) at UCLA, and a Lecturer and Research Associate at the University of Pennsylvania from 1999 to 2004. Summer Field Instructor at Harvard University from 2003 to 2006. He received his B.A. from the University of California, Berkeley in 1990 and his Ph.D. from the University of Pennsylvania in 1999. He is a Fulbright Scholar and Dumbarton Oaks Harvard Fellow.

== Contributions ==
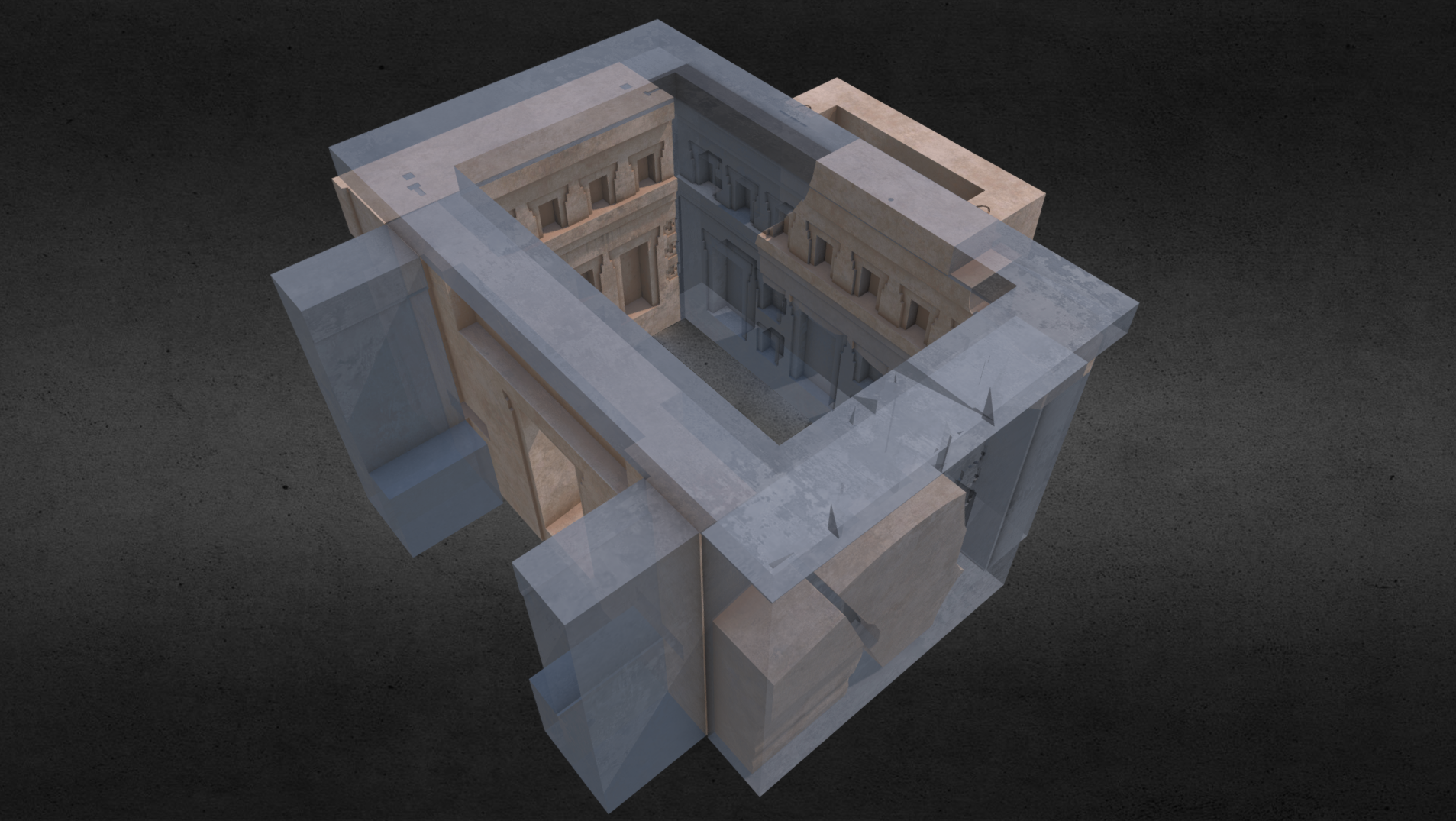
Virtual reconstruction of Pumapunku temple fragments

Vranich has conducted archaeology research in Spain, Italy, India, Bulgaria, Costa Rica and Cambodia, with notable contributions in Peru and Bolivia – Cusco, Machu Picchu, and Tiwanaku respectively. He has developed advanced techniques for computer modeling and geomatics of historical sites.

Notable publication relates to the use of 3D printing for reconstruction ancient architecture was ranked in the top 99th percentile of online attention of over 12 million articles tracked by Altmetric.

== Publications ==
=== Articles ===
- Reconstructing Ancient Architecture at Tiwanaku, Bolivia: The Potential and Promise of 3d Printing. Heritage Science. https://heritagesciencejournal.springeropen.com/articles/10.1186/s40494-018-0231-0
- Fusion of Three-Dimensional Data at Tiwanaku: An Approach to Spatial Data Integration. Christopher Goodmaster and Alexei Vranich.
- Prehistoric Urban Archaeology in the Americas: A View from Cusco, Peru. Alexei Vranich, Thomas Hardy, and Stephen Berquist. Backdirt Magazine, Cotsen Institute of Archaeology, Los Angeles, December 2014.
- Seeing What is Not There: Reconstructing the Monumental Experience. Alexei Vranich, edited by James R. Matheiu. Experimental Archaeology: replicating past objects, behaviors, and processes. Barr International Series 1035, 2002.
- Visions of Tiwanaku. Alexei Vranich. Cotsen Institute of Archaeology Press, Los Angeles 2013. ISBN 978-0-917956-09-6.
- Blackwell Studies in Global Archaeology: Experiencing the Cities of Wari and Tiwanaku. Alexei Vranich and William H. Isbell, edited by Helaine Silverman. Blackwell Publishing Limited, 2004.
- Señoras de los Imperios del Sol, Colección Arte y Tesoros del Peru: Plataformas, plazas y palacios en Tiwanaku, Bolivia (500-1000 a.d.). Alexei Vranich.
- Max Uhle, Evaluaciones de sus Investigaciones y Obras: Revalorizando a Max Uhle en Tiwanaku. Alexei Vranich. Fondo Editorial, Universidad Catolica del Peru.
- The Development of the Ritual Core of Tiwanaku. Alexei Vranich. Tiwanaku: Papers from the 2005 Mayer Symposium at the Denver Art Museum. Denver Art Museum, 2005.
- Coping with Chaos. By Alexei Vranich. Archeology magazine, May/June 2003.
- Revalorizando a Max Uhle en Tiwanaku, in Max Uhle (1856–1944). Evaluaciones de sus Investigaciones y Obras. Alexei Vranich. Edited by Peter Kaulicke, Fondo Editorial PUCP, Lima, Perú.
- Fusion of Three-Dimensional Data at Tiwanaku: An approach to Spatial Data Integration. Jackson Cothren, Christopher Goodmaster, Adam Barnes, Eileen Ernenein, Alexei Vranich, W. Fredrick Limp, Angelia Payne.
- La pirámide de Akapana: Reconsiderando el centro monumental de Tiwanaku. Alexei Vranich. Boletin de Arqueologia PUCP, No. 5, 2001.
- The Construction and Reconstruction of Ritual Space at Tiwanaku, Bolivia
- Recreating Cusco in Three Dimensions. J. Cothren, A. Barnes, A. Vranich. CAA 2010: Fusion of Cultures.
- Reed Boats and Experimental Archaeology on Lake Titicaca. Alexei Vranich, Paul Harmon, Chris Knutson. University of Pennsylvania Museum of Archaeology and Anthropology Press, Expedition magazine, Vol 47, No. 2, 2005.

=== Books ===
- Visions of Tiwanaku. Alexei Vranich and Charles Stanish. Cotsen Institute of Archaeology Press, Los Angeles 2013. ISBN 9780917956096.
- Advances in Titicaca Basin Archaeology-2. Alexei Vranich and Abigail Levine. Cotsen Institute of Archaeology Press, Los Angeles, 2013. ISBN 9781931745727.
- Advances in Titicaca Basin Archaeology-3. Alexei Vranich, Elizabeth Klarich and Charles Stanish. Cotsen Institute of Archaeology Press, Los Angeles, 2013.

== Television ==
- ‘Rise and Fall of the Incas’ at Pernel Media. France on RMC Découvertes 2025. On screen talent
- Ancient Unexplained files. 2021. On screen talent
- Expedition Unknown: Bolivia, 2018. On-screen talent and consultant. Discovery.
- What on Earth, 2017 On-screen talent and consultant. Science Channel
- Lost Kingdoms of South America, 2013. On Screen Expert and Primary Consultant.
- The Ancient Life, 2011. On Screen Expert.
- BrewMasters, 2010. On Screen Expert and Consultant.
- Voyage to the American Stonehenge, 2007. Host and Primary Consultant.
- Debunked!, 2004. Host and Primary Consultant.
