= Keck Graduate Institute =

Private graduate school in Claremont, California, US

Coordinates: 34.092796°N 117.723042°W

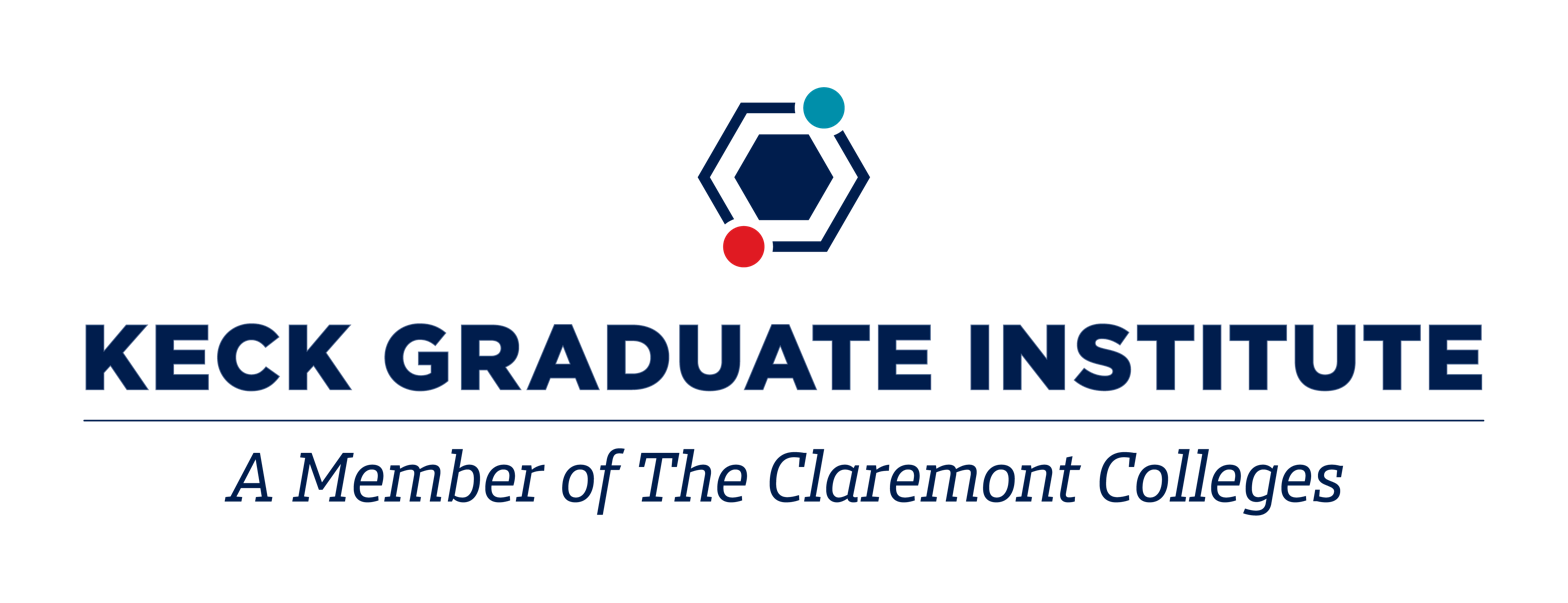
- Keck Graduate Institute logo
- Type: Private
- Established: 1997; 29 years ago
- Affiliations: Claremont Colleges
- Endowment: $58.45 million (2024)
- President: Mohamed Abousalem
- Students: 617
- Location: Claremont, California, U.S.
- Campus: Suburban
- Colors: Navy blue; aqua; red
- Website: www.kgi.edu

Keck Graduate Institute (KGI) is a private graduate school in Claremont, California, United States. Founded by Henry Riggs and David J. Galas in 1997, it is the seventh and newest member of the Claremont Colleges.

== History ==
Henry Riggs, then president of Harvey Mudd College, established the institute in 1997 to address what he perceived as a lack of scientists trained to convert new scientific discoveries into practical uses. He also became the institute's first president, serving until 2003. Co-founder David J. Galas served as the chief academic and scientific officer, dean of the faculty, and Norris Professor of Applied Life Sciences.

The decision to establish Keck Graduate Institute as a seventh Claremont College was met with some opposition, particularly from faculty of the other Claremont Colleges who objected to its lack of tenure, and environmentalists who opposed its plans to build a campus next to the Bernard Field Station, an area of undeveloped scrubland. The environmental issue was largely settled when KGI decided to establish its campus at a different location, and other opposition gradually faded.

The institute received a $50 million endowment from the W. M. Keck Foundation, after which it was named. It awarded its first Master of Bioscience degree in 2002.

In 2003, Sheldon Schuster became the second president in the institute's history and in 2023, announced his retirement. Schuster took over from Riggs, who became chairman of the school's board of trustees. Schuster is a biochemist who previously served as director of the University of Florida's biotechnology research program. In 2024, Keck Graduate Institute's board of trustees named Mohamed Abousalem as KGI's third president.

== Academics ==
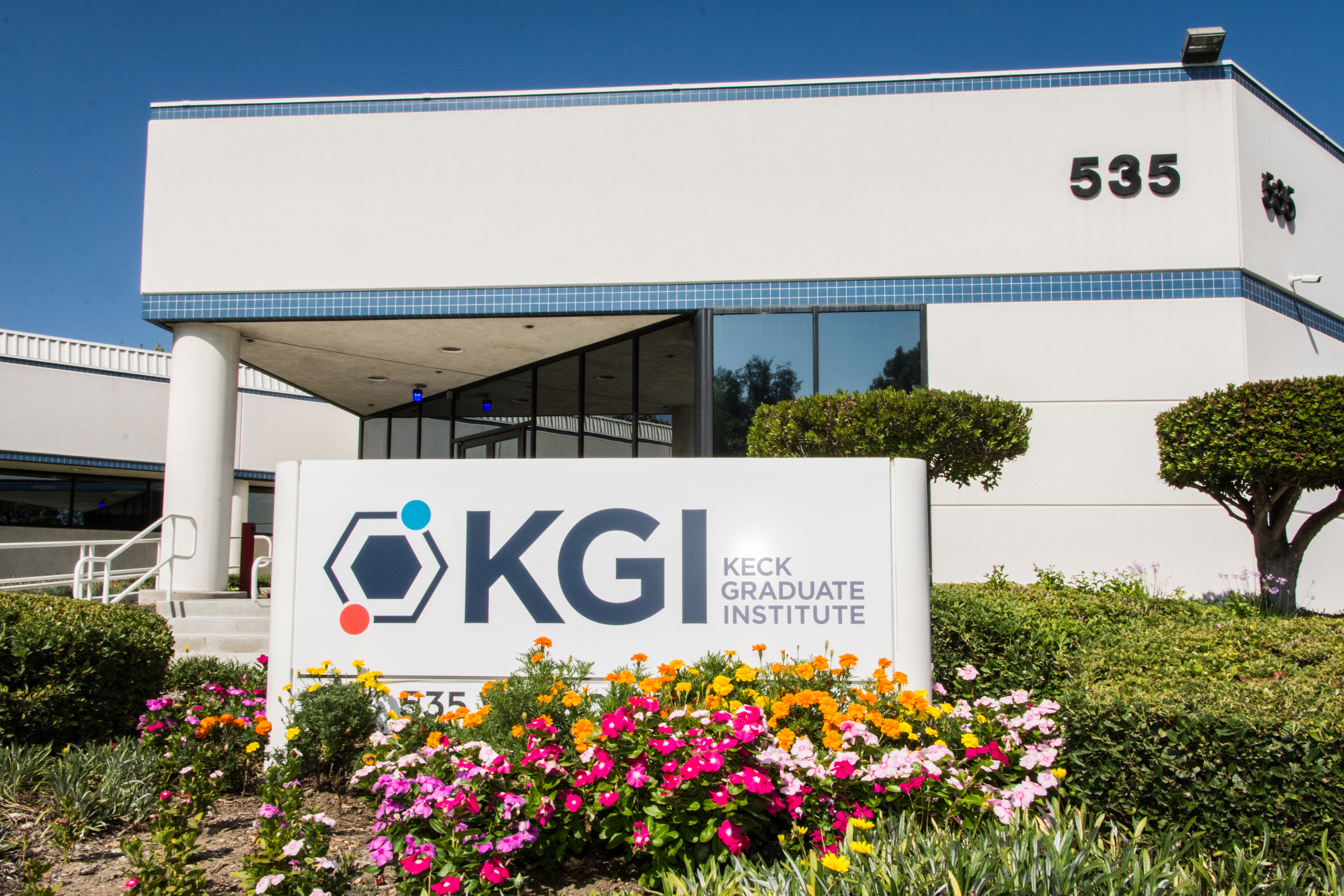
Keck Graduate Institute campus

Academic programs at KGI are organized into three schools: Henry E. Riggs School of Applied Life Sciences, School of Health Sciences, and School of Pharmacy. Keck Graduate Institute of Applied Life Sciences is accredited by the Accrediting Commission for Senior Colleges and Universities of the Western Association of Schools and Colleges. The School of Pharmacy is accredited by the Accreditation Council for Pharmacy Education (ACPE). In August 2019, KGI appointed J. Mario Molina dean of the new School of Medicine.

KGI also has a Master of Science in Human Genetics and Genetic Counseling program accredited by Accreditation Council for Genetic Counseling.

== Research centers ==
KGI maintains four research centers: the Center for Rare Disease Therapies, the Center for Biomarker Research, the Science Heritage Center and the Amgen Bioprocessing Center. The Amgen Bioprocessing Center was funded by a 2004 grant of $2 million to KGI from Amgen, a pharmaceutical company based in Thousand Oaks, California.

On December 28, 2016, KGI announced a plan to start a Master of Science in Human Genetics and Genetic Counseling program funded by an additional $1.5 million grant from Amgen.

=== Spin-off companies ===
Ionian Technologies was founded in 2000, and was the first spin-off company to commercialize technology developed at KGI. Ionian focuses on molecular diagnostics for emerging and infectious diseases, and in 2004 was awarded a contract to develop a handheld biothreat detector using isothermal amplification of DNA. Other KGI startups include Zuyder Pharmaceuticals and Claremont BioSolutions.

== Noted people ==
=== Presidents ===
#	Image	Name	Term start	Term end	Ref.
1		Henry E. Riggs	1997	July 14, 2003	
2		Sheldon Schuster	July 15, 2003	June 30, 2024	
3		Mohamed Abousalem	July 1, 2024	present	

== See also ==
- Association of Independent Technological Universities
