= Henry E. Riggs =

American academic administrator (1935–2015)

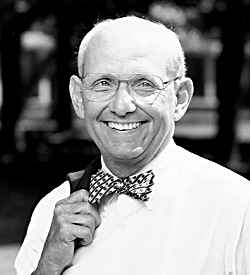
Hank Riggs

Henry E. ("Hank") Riggs (February 26, 1935 - June 10, 2015) was an early Silicon Valley entrepreneur, a professor of engineering and vice president at Stanford University, president of Harvey Mudd College, and founding president of Keck Graduate Institute (KGI) of Applied Life Sciences at the Claremont Colleges. His areas of specialization included financial analysis and control, management technology, technical strategy, and new venture management. Riggs was a popular professor who taught for over 45 years and published multiple books. He started the large-scale academic fund-raising efforts that are now widely used by major institutions, launched a graduate school focused solely on training leaders in biosciences (KGI), and served on numerous boards.

== Early life and education ==
Riggs was raised in Hinsdale, Illinois, the youngest of three children born to Joseph and Gretchen Riggs (siblings Ruth and Joseph Andrew). His father helped run the Goss Printing Press Company, which developed presses for newspapers. Riggs attended boarding school at Phillips Academy, Andover, followed by Stanford University, where he earned a BS in Industrial Engineering in 1957. Riggs then received an MBA from the Harvard Business School in 1960. He also holds honorary Doctorates in Engineering from Harvey Mudd College and in Applied Life Sciences from the Keck Graduate Institute.

== Early business career ==
Riggs worked for over a decade at early Silicon Valley companies and institutes. Between undergraduate and graduate school (1957–1958) he worked at Ampex, and from 1960 to 1963 at the Stanford Research Institute (now SRI International). From 1963 to 1970 Riggs worked at Icore Industries, as president for his final three years, and from 1970 to 1974, he was Chief Financial Officer at Measurex.

== Teaching career ==
While working at Icore Riggs began to teach part-time at Stanford and joined the faculty full time in 1974. He was the Thomas Ford Professor of Engineering Management. From 1978 to 1983 he was chair of the Stanford Industrial Engineering and Engineering Management Department. One of Riggs' key courses at Stanford was Industrial Accounting (IE 133; now IE 140), which covered principles of financial and cost accounting. He was a dedicated teacher, and in 1979 was awarded the Tau Beta Pi Award for Excellence in Undergraduate Engineering Teaching, and in 1980 he received Stanford's highest award for excellence in teaching: the Walter J. Gores Faculty Achievement Award. Riggs commonly used case studies in his teaching, and as he biked through campus to class, he cut quite a figure in his suit and signature bow-tie. He continued to teach while taking on academic leadership roles (below). Following his retirement from KGI, he returned to Stanford as emeritus Professor and continued to teach there from 2004 until 2015. Riggs was teaching “The Art and Logic of Fundraising” course as part of Stanford's Continuing Studies Program just weeks before his death.

== Academic leadership career ==
=== Vice President for Development at Stanford ===
In 1983 Riggs was named vice president for Development at Stanford and headed all university fundraising efforts. In this role he re-imagined academic philanthropy as a large-scale operation. With this approach he successfully led the Stanford Centennial Campaign, the first billion dollar academic fund-raising effort, which has been widely followed by major institutions.

=== President of Harvey Mudd College ===
Riggs was named President of Harvey Mudd College in 1988. During his 9 years as president major advances were made to the college. This included building multiple new buildings and the Linde student recreation center, providing new or renovated space to all faculty members, increasing enrollment by 70 students, attracting new faculty members, launching Biology and Computer Science Departments, successfully undertaking a large fund-raising campaign, and balancing the college's budget.

=== Founding President of Keck Graduate Institute (KGI) ===
Riggs' early career in Silicon Valley left him convinced that colleges and universities need to be more flexible and entrepreneurial to serve their students and the public good. In 1997 Riggs founded the seventh Claremont College, the Keck Graduate Institute of Applied Life Sciences (KGI). Riggs' vision for KGI was based on the realization that life sciences would dominate the 21st century and that new institutions were needed to educate the future leaders in this realm. KGI was the nation's first graduate school dedicated solely to preparing students for professional careers in life sciences and offers a Master of Bioscience (MBS) degree and a doctoral degree (MBS-PhD) in Applied Life Sciences. The KGI curriculum uses entrepreneurial, team-based learning and real-world projects that integrate computational and systems biology, bioengineering, business management and bioethics. Riggs served as President of KGI from 1997 to 2003, as chair of the Board of Trustees from 2003 to 2004, and President Emeritus from 2003 to 2015. In 2006 the Henry E. Riggs Professor of Management was endowed at KGI in honor of Riggs' vision founding the school, and more recently KGI has named their life sciences school the Henry E. Riggs School of Applied Life Sciences

== Other leadership roles ==
Riggs held a number of important leadership roles in industry and education.

- Board on Higher Education & Workforce, National Academies.
- Trustee, Phillips Andover Academy.
- Board of trustees of Franklin W. Olin College of Engineering.
- Board Institute for Systems Biology.
- Member of the California Council on Science and Technology.
- Chair of the Stanford University alumni association's board of directors.
- Board, Capital Group (Growth Fund of America, American Balanced Fund, Income Fund of America, Fundamental Investors, and International Growth and Income Fund).
- Board, International Technology Corporation
- Board of the American Automobile Association.
- Board, Avenidas

== Writing ==
Riggs wrote many articles and books.

- The Price of Perception, influential New York Times op-ed challenging the practices by which top-tier colleges set tuition rates.
- The Mouths of Gift Horses, about leveraging gifts for both institutions and society.
- Accounting: A Survey
- Managing High-Technology Companies, Wadsworth, 1983.
- Financial and Economic Analysis for Engineering and Technology Management
- Understanding the Financial Score, 2007
- The Art and Logic of Fundraising, 2014.

== Personal ==
He met his wife, Gayle Carson Riggs, when they were both undergraduates at Stanford and they married in 1958. They have three children and six grandchildren.

Academic offices
Preceded by D. Kenneth Baker	3rd President of Harvey Mudd College; 1988–1997	Succeeded by Jon Strauss
New office	2nd President of Keck Graduate Institute; 2003–present	Succeeded by Sheldon Schuster
