= Umbrella organization =

Group of industry-specific institutions

An umbrella organization is an association of (often related, industry-specific) institutions who work together formally to coordinate activities and/or pool resources. In business, political, and other environments, it provides resources and identities to the smaller organizations. In this kind of arrangement, it is sometimes responsible, to some degree, for the groups under its care. Umbrella organizations are prominent in cooperatives and in civil society, and can engage in advocacy or collective bargaining on behalf of their members.

== Examples ==
- AFL–CIO and other national trade union centers
- DD172
- Department of Public Safety
- European Armenian Federation for Justice and Democracy
- European Music Council
- European Federation for Welding, Joining and Cutting (EWF)
- Federation of Poles in Great Britain
- Federation of Student Islamic Societies
- Independent Sector
- National Retail Federation
- National Wrestling Alliance
- Open Source Geospatial Foundation
- Software in the Public Interest
- UEFA
- Ulster Defence Association
- United Way
- Yamaguchi-gumi
- National Federation of Coffee Growers of Colombia
- ANC

=== Asia ===
==== Bangladesh ====
- Hefazat-e-Islam Bangladesh

=== Europe ===
==== Russia ====
- The former KGB

==== United Kingdom ====
- Bond: network for organisations working in international development
- NAVCA (National Association for Voluntary and Community Action) (UK)
- Transport for London
- Maritime UK

=== North America ===
- Canadian GeoAlliance
- Canadian Hockey League
- Central Intelligence Agency
- Jewish Federations of North America
- Rainbow Railroad
- Metropolitan Toronto School Board and its six boards
- United Fund for the Arts and Humanities
- United States Geospatial Intelligence Foundation

=== Global ===
- International Co-operative Alliance
- International Federation of Organic Agriculture Movements
- Girls on the Run
- United Nations umbrella organizations

== See also ==
- Big tent
- Federation
- Supraorganization
- Umbrella brand
- Umbrella company
- Umbrella fund
- Umbrella school
- Umbrella term
