= Mirković =

Mirković (Serbian Cyrillic: Мирковић, pronounced [mǐːrkoʋitɕ]; meaning "son of "Mirko") is a Serbian and Croatian surname, and may refer to:

- Borivoje Mirković (1884–1969), Yugoslav brigadier general
- Čedomir Mirković (1944–2005), Serbian writer
- Dragana Mirković (born 1968), Serbian pop-folk singer
  - DM SAT (Dragana Mirković Satelitska Televizija), Serbian cable/satellite music video and entertainment channel
- Ivan Mirković (born 1987), Serbian footballer
- Mijo Mirković "Mate Balota" (1898–1963), Croatian economist
- Milan Mirković (born 1985), Serbian handballer
- Miško Mirković (born 1966), Serbian footballer
- Nikola Mirković (born 1991), Serbian football goalkeeper
- Slađana Mirković (born 1995), Serbian volleyball player
- Sreten Mirković (born 1958), Serbian boxer
- Stojadin Mirković (1972–1991), Yugoslav soldier
- Vlado Mirković (born 1975), Serbian-Montenegrin footballer
- Zoran Mirković (born 1971), Serbian footballer
