= Canadian Institute of Geomatics =

The Canadian Institute of Geomatics (CIG, French: Association canadienne des sciences géomatiques) is a not-for-profit scientific association based in Ottawa, Ontario, devoted to the development of geomatics in Canada. It was previously known as "Canadian Institute of Surveying and Mapping" and the "Association canadienne des sciences géodésiques et cartographiques".

Founded in 1882, the Canadian Institute of Geomatics evolved into be a non-profit scientific and technical association that represents the largest and most influential geospatial community in Canada. The Canadian Institute of Geomatics are one of the founding members of Canadian GeoAlliance, an umbrella organization started to help address sector-wide strategic priorities in the geomatics sector.

CIG sponsors the academic journal Geomatica, published by Elsevier. It was previously published by Canadian Science Publishing.

== See also ==
- American Congress on Surveying and Mapping
- Geomatics Association of Nova Scotia
- International Federation of Surveyors
