= Schuester =

Schuester is a surname. Notable people and fictional characters with the surname include:

- Will Schuester, a fictional character from the musical comedy-drama TV series Glee
- Terri Schuester, a fictional character from Glee
