= Measurex =

Coordinates: 37.317°N 122.052°W

Measurex Corp.
- Company type: Corporation
- Founded: January 18, 1968
- Fate: Acquired by Honeywell in March 1997
- Successor: Honeywell
- Headquarters: 1 Results Way; Cupertino, California, U.S.
- Key people: David A. "Dave" Bossen, Founder; Dr. Erik B. Dahlin, software Mat Boissevain, sensors
- Products: MX1000, MX2000, MX2001, MX 2002, MXVision MXOpen

Measurex was an American company based in Cupertino, California. It was one of the first companies to develop computer control systems for industry, primarily the paper-making industry. The development of the control systems included the development of control software, and development of scanning sensors to measure different properties of paper.

The company was acquired by Honeywell in March 1997, at a price tag of almost $600 million. At the acquisition, Measurex had 2,250 employees in 30 countries and revenue of $254 million.

== History ==
=== Early years ===
Measurex was conceived in 1967 by David A. "Dave" Bossen, then a sales manager at Industrial Nucleonics, and the new company opened its doors on January 18, 1968, in Santa Clara, California. It was first a garage set-up based on paper industry experiences (circa 1966) at 330 Mathew Street, but later moved several miles southwest to Cupertino to an old cannery property. Ground was broken for the 52,000-square-foot (4,800 m^{2}) new headquarters in July 1971 and it opened the following year. Its initial public offering of 60,000 shares was completed on March 28, 1972, trading as symbol MSRX on NASDAQ. In 1973, a 20,000 sq ft (1,900 m^{2}) plant was opened in Waterford, Ireland, in June and 41,000 sq ft (3,800 m^{2}) was added to the Cupertino campus.

The use of mini-computers was a part of the business plan, and Measurex initially used the Hewlett Packard 2116B mini-computer in the MX1000 (1968) and MX2000 (1974)systems. Later on, with the MX2001 systems (1977), Measurex used the 21MX mini-computer.

In 1978, 127,000 sq ft (11,800 m^{2}) was added in Cupertino, the Waterford plant expanded to 80,000 sq ft (7,400 m^{2}), and a new 47,000 sq ft (4,400 m^{2}) facility in Ireland was constructed in Cork. By the end of the year, nearly 1,000 systems had been installed in 25 countries and Measurex had more than 1,800 employees worldwide.

Starting with the MX2002 systems in 1980, Measurex started to use the DEC LSI 11. Intel based system was introduced with the MX2002 Vision systems (using Intel 8086) in 1983, but still with the LSI 11 as a Scanner Support Processor (SSP). The reason for keeping the older LSI 11 in the architecture, was the computer's ability of near real-time processing of gauge data and also the LSI 11's support for hardware interrupts.

=== Acquisition of Devron ===
Measurex acquired the British Columbia firm Devron-Hercules Inc. in 1991. Devron was a company specializing in solutions for Cross Directional optimization of the paper sheet in paper machines.

=== Acquisition of Roibox ===
In April 1993, Measurex acquired the Finnish company Roibox Oy, for approximately $1.7 million.

=== Honeywell-Measurex ===
Honeywell kept the name Measurex for a number of years after the acquisition, giving the subsidiary the name Honeywell-Measurex.

== Development of sensors ==
Early sensors were almost exclusively based on continuous process pulp and paper making, beginning with basis weight, moisture, caliper and whiteness. Later sensors were developed for new industries, including tire calendaring, cigarette fill, aluminum rolling mill gage thickness and others. Some of the early sensors were based on emissions from radioactive source materials it would probably be difficult for a similar firm to experiment with today. Even with the regulatory and training burden, nuclear sources continue to be the core sensor for sheet moisture and basis weight.

== Service ==
Measurex had a service business that was 40% of the annual revenue. Most of the mills at the time could not support a computer control system, and at the same time get an up-time of 99% or better. Measurex provided dedicated, on-site service for this, since it was a very expensive investment for a mill to train a technician.

Customers of Measurex systems reported that the dedication and expertise of the service organization was a considerable factor in creating the customer confidence that resulted in sales growth, especially the repeat sales that fueled the remarkable growth during the 25 years leading up to the acquisition by Honeywell. As founder Dave Bossen often told service personnel: "Our results are far greater with a superior field service organization working with average systems, compared to manufacturing superior systems, but installed and maintained by an average field service organization". Of course, he was also quite emphatic about having manufacturing produce superior systems as well, resulting in their standing as a lead supplier of quality and control systems for the paper industry.

== Results guarantee ==
One business strategy for Measurex was the Result Guarantee, which allowed the customer to return the Measurex system. This allowed customers to gain confidence in the systems. In 1975 a company wide competition was held for employees to name the new street upon which the new Measurex facilities were built. None of the employee submittals was selected and founder Dave Bossen chose "1 Results Way" to amplify the company's commitment to results. (not quite the whole story, the selection committee gave the award for the name to the employee who submitted "Digital Drive" but Dave changed it to "Results Way," stating that digital was a technology with only temporary relevance and what if the street had been named a few years earlier as "Analog Ave"?)

== Corporate campus ==
The twenty-acre (8 ha) Measurex campus in Cupertino became the "Results Way Corporate Center," owned by Embarcadero Capital Partners of Belmont.

In 2011, Apple Inc. leased the property and it became the company's Results Way campus. Embarcadero sold the 383,000-square-foot (35,600 m^{2}) complex to New York City-based Deutsche Asset & Wealth Management in 2013.
