= Andrea Bianchimano =

Italian footballer (born 1996)

Personal information
- Date of birth: 25 December 1996 (age 29)
- Place of birth: Carate Brianza, Italy
- Height: 1.96 m (6 ft 5 in)
- Position: Striker

Team information
- Current team: Clodiense

Youth career
- –2014: Biassono
- 2015–2016: Milan

Senior career*
Years	Team	Apps	(Gls)
2014–2015	Olginatese	23	(8)
2016–2017	Milan	0	(0)
2016–2017	→ Reggina (loan)	29	(4)
2017–2018	Reggina	14	(6)
2018–2022	Perugia	36	(8)
2018	→ Reggina (loan)	11	(3)
2019–2020	→ Catanzaro (loan)	34	(9)
2022–2023	Viterbese	17	(1)
2022–2023	→ Lucchese (loan)	20	(4)
2023–2024	Renate	12	(1)
2024	Olbia	14	(0)
2024–2025	Fermana	30	(9)
2025–	Clodiense	6	(0)
- * Club domestic league appearances and goals as of 4 March 2026

Andrea Bianchimano (born 25 December 1996) is an Italian professional footballer who plays as a striker for Serie D club Clodiense.

== Career ==
=== Early career ===
Bianchimano was born in the Lombardy town of Carate Brianza. He began his career at local side Biassono, before signing for Olginatese in 2014. After making just one appearance for the Serie D side, playing 54 minutes of a 2–2 draw with Pergolettese on 19 October 2014, Bianchimano was signed by Lombardy side and Serie A giants Milan.

=== Milan ===
Bianchimano played in the Milan youth teams, eventually making his way into the Primavera side. He made 15 appearances, scoring 3 goals. Milan felt that Bianchimano was developed enough to play at the professional level, and subsequently sent him on a one-year loan to newly-promoted Lega Pro side Reggina. The 1.96 m (6 ft 5 in) striker made his debut for the Amaranto on 21 August 2016, playing the full 90 minutes of a 0–1 loss to Paganese in the Coppa Italia Lega Pro. His first goal for the club came in the second minute of injury time in the game against Catanzaro, rescuing a 1–1 draw after starting the game on the bench and only playing the last 10 minutes.

=== Perugia ===
==== Loan to Catanzaro ====
On 18 January 2019, he joined Serie C club Catanzaro on loan until the end of the 2018–19 season.

=== Viterbese ===
On 18 January 2022, he went to Serie C club Viterbese. On 24 August 2022, Bianchimano was loaned by Lucchese.

=== Olbia ===
On 17 January 2024, Bianchimano signed a 1.5-year contract with Olbia.
