= Joseph Molina =

Former CEO of Molina Healthcare (born 1958)

- Born: May 16, 1958 (age 68); California, United States
- Occupations: Business executive, physician
- Known for: Former CEO of Molina Healthcare

Joseph Mario Molina (born May 16, 1958) is an American business executive in the healthcare industry who was the former CEO of his family's business Molina Healthcare.

== Early life and education ==
Joseph Molina was born in California in 1958. He obtained his M.D. from the University of Southern California, where he was elected to membership in Alpha Omega Alpha and Sigma Xi. He has an honorary doctorate from Claremont Graduate University.

Molina did his medical internship and residency at the Johns Hopkins Hospital. After that, he was a fellow for four years at the University of California, San Diego, and the San Diego Veterans Affairs Medical Center, in endocrinology and metabolism. Thereafter he became assistant professor of medicine at USC.

== Career ==
The whole Molina family launched the health care business that would become Molina Healthcare Inc.. The siblings Mario, Joseph, John and three sisters working at the first three clinics for their father. They were expected to help out so they worked the reception desk, painted buildings, cleaned, washed windows and did anything that needed to be done, other than seeing patients. Mario however did eventually see patients, after qualifying as a doctor.

Prior to his leadership roles at the firm, Joseph Molina held a number of other key roles at Molina Healthcare. These included Medical Director (supervising medical and risk management matters) and vice president (in charge of provider contracting, member services, marketing and QA).

Following the death of his father and founder of the company, C. David Molina, MD in 1996, Joseph Molina took on key executive roles as chief executive officer, chairman of the board and president.

In 2009 Molina Healthcare took in $3.7 billion, of which $31 million was profit. Molina's personal total compensation for 2014 was: $7,854,147.

== Other positions ==
He is also a director of America's Health Insurance Plans and a member of the Financial Solvency Standards Board, the American College of Physicians, California Medical Association and the boards of the California Association of Health Insurance Plans, Aquarium of the Pacific, and the Homeboy Industries. He is also on the board of trustees at Johns Hopkins Medicine.

== Recognition ==
Molina received the Ernst & Young Greater Los Angeles Entrepreneur of the Year Award in 2002. In the same year, he was inducted into the Long Beach Community College Hall of Fame. He became an honoree of the Greater Long Beach National Conference for Community and Justice. Time Magazine featured him as one of America's most influential Hispanics in 2005.
