= Leonardo Taurino =

Italian footballer

Personal information
- Date of birth: 25 July 1995 (age 31)
- Place of birth: Taranto, Italy
- Height: 1.68 m (5 ft 6 in)
- Position: Forward

Team information
- Current team: Virtus Francavilla

Youth career
- –2012: Taranto
- 2012–2014: Ternana

Senior career*
Years	Team	Apps	(Gls)
2014–2018	Ternana	2	(0)
2016	→ Martina Franca (loan)	16	(1)
2016–2017	→ Casertana (loan)	12	(2)
2018	→ Fidelis Andria (loan)	10	(2)
2018–2020	Vibonese	52	(10)
2020–2022	Bitonto	58	(8)
2022–2024	Casertana	36	(2)
2024–2025	Virtus Francavilla	?	(?)
2025-2026	Fidelis Andria	?	(?)
2026-	Taranto	0	(0)
- * Club domestic league appearances and goals as of 5 May 2024

Leonardo Taurino (born 25 July 1995) is an Italian football player who plays for Eccellenza club Taranto

== Club career ==
He made his Serie B debut for Ternana on 4 November 2014 in a game against Virtus Entella.
