= Shuster =

Shuster (originally a spelling variant of Schuster) is the surname of several people:

- Bill Shuster, American politician from Pennsylvania
- Bud Shuster, American politician and Bill Shuster's father
- David Shuster, American reporter
- Frank Shuster, Canadian comedian
- Jared Shuster (born 1998), American baseball player
- Joe Shuster, Canadian-American comic book artist
- John Shuster, American Olympic curler
- Mike Shuster, journalist
- William Morgan Shuster, American diplomat
- Savik Shuster, Ukrainian journalist
- Suzy Shuster, reporter
- William Howard Shuster, American artist
