= Tecterra =

TECTERRA Inc.
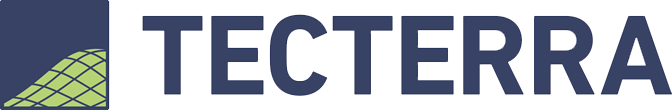
- Formation: June 2010
- Type: Non-profit
- Headquarters: Calgary
- Services: Commercialization and development of Geomatics technology
- Website: www.tecterra.com

Tecterra, usually written as TECTERRA or TECTERRA Inc., is a Canadian geomatics technology innovation support centre. Established in June 2010 as a non-profit organization, Tecterra assists geomatics technology companies across Alberta to achieve commercial success faster than they can on their own. With current funding from the Government of Alberta, Tecterra is focused on investing in geomatics innovation for resource management and other markets. The organization's funding model is unique, as support for companies does not require intellectual property ownership or corporate equity in exchange for funds.

== History ==
Beginning operations in 2010, Tecterra was created in collaboration with the Alberta government to better utilize the natural resources in Alberta through the commercialization of geomatics technology. Tecterra's goal is to create prosperity through innovation, where innovation is the tangible value gained from the use of technology in everyday life. Tecterra's funding sources have included: Western Economic Diversification Canada, Alberta Innovates - Technology Futures, and the Government of Canada - Centres of Excellence for Commercialization and Research.

== Programs ==
Tecterra supports companies through funding and support programs. Companies are invited to apply to their programs at any time, and an internal review process is conducted alongside Tecterra's advisory committees. Programs include:

=== Industry Investment Program (IND) ===
The Industry Investment Program enables and supports small to medium size Alberta geomatics companies in the development and commercialization of innovative geomatics solutions for integrated resource management. Funding is focused on solutions for energy, forestry, agriculture, environment, land management and land development. Companies that apply under this program are eligible to receive from $150,000 to $500,000 in matching contribution. Funding is provided as an interest free loan repayable only after commercial success.

Qualifying companies fit the following criteria

- A for-profit company
- Incorporated and operating in Alberta
- Minimum of one and no more than 500 full-time employees
- Annual sales revenue ordinarily not exceeding $50 million

=== Commercialization Support Services Program (CSS) ===
The Commercialization Support Services program provides funds assisting Alberta geomatics entrepreneurs and companies in the implementation of best-practice techniques in the development, management and growth of their business. Tecterra provides necessary funding in order for companies to work with industry experts such as marketing, accounting, IP management, and business development to ensure that companies grow the appropriate business capacity and become self-sufficient. The CSS program provides up to $50,000 towards eligible costs in one calendar year per applicant. The company is responsible for repaying 25% of the funding provided at project completion. The program focuses on small businesses or individual entrepreneurs who may have the technical knowledge to develop a product, but lack the skills necessary in order to successfully run a business.

=== GEO-Placement Program (GEO) ===
The GEO-Placement Funding Program is designed to create economic value for small companies in Alberta by facilitating the engagement and employment of highly qualified technical and business geomatics personnel. The grant reimburses companies up to 50% of the employees salary for the first year, up to $50,000. Moving costs are covered to a max of $10,000 if the employee is moving to Alberta from another province. Funding is provided as a non-repayable grant.

=== Tradeshow Attendance Program (TAP) ===
The Tradeshow Attendance Program is designed to assist Alberta geomatics companies and entrepreneurs attend relevant industry events, conferences and trade shows in support of the commercialization of their products and technology. The program provides up to 100% of event registration costs, three nights of hotels costs, and other eligible costs up to $20,000 and two separate events. Funding is provided as a non-repayable grant.

=== Geomatics Lab ===
Tecterra's Geomatics Lab provides geomatics equipment for use by Alberta companies and those engaging in applied R&D programs. Equipment is available to borrow at no cost for portfolio companies, and to rent at a subsidized rate for non-portfolio companies.

== Events ==
=== Tecterra Showcase ===
The Tecterra Geomatics Showcase is the organization's main event that takes place annually in Calgary, Alberta, Canada.

Their most recent Showcase, held at the Calgary TELUS Convention Centre on June 24, 2015, featured more than 60 portfolio companies and four university applied research projects, with keynote speaker, Nolan Bushnell, world renowned entrepreneur and founder of Atari Inc. Michelle Rempel, former Minister of State for Western Economic Diversification Canada, was also in attendance and provided a speech. More than 500 geomatics and industry professionals were in attendance, marking this as the organization's biggest event to date.

== Economic impact ==
Since June 2010, Tecterra has committed over $33.9 million to geomatics companies and applied research groups for innovative geomatics technology and commercialization, training and new job creation across Alberta and Canada. This amount has been matched with $23.3 million in private investments. To date, the organization has generated over $145 million in actual economic impact on the Canadian economy, with a projection to grow to over $300 million in the next five years.

Highlights from Tecterra's economic impact include:

| Project / activity type | # of Units | Investment $ |
|---|---|---|
| Small and medium geomatics companies supported through project investments and various business support programs | 171 companies | $20,731,991 |
| New HQP jobs (including those within funded projects) | 284 HQP | $1,827,162 |
| University applied research projects | 25 projects | $4,678,505 |
| HQP trained on state-of-the-art geomatics technology | 610 HQP | $248,147 |
| Tecterra Geomatics Lab investment for product development and HQP training | 25,258 equipment days, 97 training days | $6,424,809 |

Tecterra has funded private and government programs such as Avalanche Canada and Blackbridge Geomatics.

Tecterra has in the past, funded university projects and also provided scholarships for students in the geomatics sector.

== International relations ==
In 2014, members of Tecterra were invited by the Consulate General of France in Vancouver to visit several technology institutions in France. These included: the University of Avignon - UMR Espace and Laboratoire Souterrain à Bas Bruit, TERINOV Cluster, and the National Research Institute of Science and Technology for Environment and Agriculture. The purpose of the visit was to establish relations between technology partners in France and Canada, and discover possible collaborations and technology transfers between the two countries.

== Notable achievements ==
- 2014 Outstanding Contribution to the Alberta Science and Technology Community - ASTech Foundation
- Commissioning of HMS Erebus 3D model by CARIS and with support of Fisheries and Oceans Canada
- A recognized Centre of Excellence for Commercialization and Research by the Government of Canada
- Launch of the Mountain Information Network in partnership with Avalanche Canada
