= Wilhelm Schuster =

German ornithologist (1880–1942)

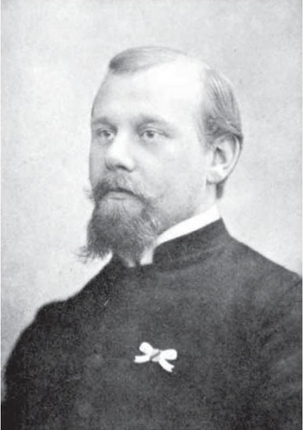
Schuster c. 1908

Wilhelm Schuster sometimes given as Wilhelm Schuster von Forstner (26 October 1880 – 3 April 1942) was a German pastor and amateur naturalist with an interest in birds. He wrote nearly 500 articles on birdlife and started a private ornithological institution, but was noted for needlessly raking up controversy and arguing with established ornithologists. Some have suggested that he was mentally ill. He was repeatedly taken to court on charges of begging and making false claims while raising charity. His arrest followed the banning of his book by Nazi authorities, and he was killed in the Sachsenhausen concentration camp.

== Life and work ==
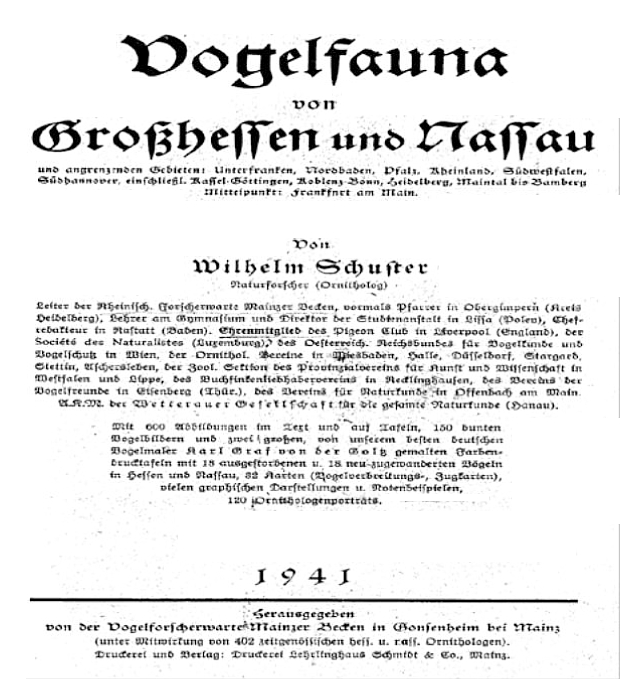
Title page of the book that led to his arrest

Schuster was born in Oberroßbach to Protestant pastor Wilhelm Ludwig Schuster and, along with three of his ten siblings, took an interest in birds at an early age. He grew up in Frischborn and went to high school in Fulda. He wrote a book on birds even as a student, in 1902. He studied philosophy and theology at the Universities of Strasbourg, Greifswald and Giessen. Following the family tradition, he too became a pastor first at Liverpool and then at Durmersheim and Obergimpern. He was apparently suspended from the church in 1912 and banned from using the title of pastor. He married in 1913 and used his wife's name as Schuster von Forstner without a legal procedure, leading to disputes after their divorce. In 1916, he joined the Prussian Army but deserted from the western front and became a private tutor in Poland in a German grammar school at Leszno. He did not do well and returned to Germany, where he attempted to work on ornithology, collecting money from various people, some of whom went to court for false claims made by him. He built a private ornithological institution at Mainz-Gonsenheim in 1928, and he was fined for building violations and imprisoned for ten days. At court, he was told that he could not call it an ornithological station ("Vogelwarte" was reserved for state institutions), so he renamed it an ornithological research station. He continued his attempts to raise funds, for which people complained to the Nazi regime in 1933, and in 1935, he received a two-year prison term. A German biographical account notes that his problems began after Otto Schmidtgen reported him to the SS. He was released in 1938 and he began to write a book on birds Vogelfauna von Großhessen und Nassau which was published in 1941. It included political statements, particularly anti-war statements. This led to his book being banned, and in September 1941, he was arrested and sent to the Sachsenhausen concentration camp.

=== Scientific contribution ===
Analysis of Schuster's works, including his first writing in 1902 on climate change in the Tertiary Period has been debated. According to Nowak, he was among the first to recognize a second global warming. Others have considered his work of dubious scientific value.

=== Death ===
One of the SS-Oberscharfuhrer officers in command at the camp was Wilhelm Schubert, who had been nicknamed 'Pistol Schubert' for his habit of shooting prisoners casually. On 3 April 1942, during a morning muster of prisoners, Schubert suddenly caught sight of Schuster and abused him for being a pastor and punched him. After Schubert fell to the ground, he kicked him to death. Schubert was arrested in 1946 and taken by the Soviet NKVD. Schubert received a life imprisonment sentence from the Soviet military tribunal in 1947. In 1956, Schubert was returned following negotiations by Konrad Adenauer, and he was released. He was again arrested in 1956 and tried in 1958 in Bonn. The court ruled that he was guilty of 46 murders, and he was given 46 life imprisonment terms. Ornithologist Eugeniusz Nowak met him and interviewed him in prison and found him an unrepentant admirer of Hitler and the Third Reich.
