= Šuštar =

Šuštar is a Slovenian surname. Notable people with the surname include:

- Alojzij Šuštar (1920–2007), Slovenian Roman Catholic prelate
- Franc Šuštar (born 1959), Slovenian Roman Catholic prelate
- Predrag Šustar (born 1970), Croatian professor and politician

== See also ==
- Shushtar, a city in Iran
