= Guido Schuster =

Guido M. Schuster is a professor of Electrical and Computer Engineering at the Hochschule für Technik Rapperswil (HSR), Rapperswil, St. Gallen, Switzerland, where he focuses on digital signal processing and wireless sensor networks.

== Biography ==
Schuster obtained the M.S. and Ph.D. degrees from the Department of Electrical and Computer Engineering, Northwestern University, Evanston, Illinois, USA, in 1992 and 1996, respectively.

In 1996, he joined the Network Systems Division of USRobotics in Mount Prospect, Illinois (later purchased by 3Com). He co-founded the 3Com Advanced Technologies Research Center and served as its associate director. He also co-founded the 3Com Internet Communications Business Unit and developed the first commercially available SIP IP Telephony system. He was promoted to Chief Technology Officer and Senior Director of this Business Unit. During this time, he also served as an Adjunct Professor in the Electrical and Computer Engineering Department at Northwestern University.

In 2007, he became the director of the Master Research Unit "Sensor, Actuator and Communication Systems", which consists of six full-time professors and is supported by the Institute for Communication Systems and the Institute for Microelectronics and Embedded Systems.

Schuster holds over 50 U.S. patents in fields ranging from adaptive control over video compression to Internet telephony. He is the co-author of the book Rate-Distortion Based Video Compression (Kluwer Academic Publishers) and has published over 60 peer reviewed journal, proceedings, and book articles.

He is the recipient of the gold medal for academic excellence at the NTB, the winner of the first Landis & Gyr fellowship competition, the recipient of the 3Com inventor of the year 1999 award, the recipient of the Institute of Electrical and Electronics Engineers Signal Processing Society Best Paper Award 2001 in the multimedia signal processing area, and the recipient of the FUTUR Technology Transfer Innovation Award 2006 and 2007.
