= Nii Nortey Ashong =

Ghanaian professional footballer

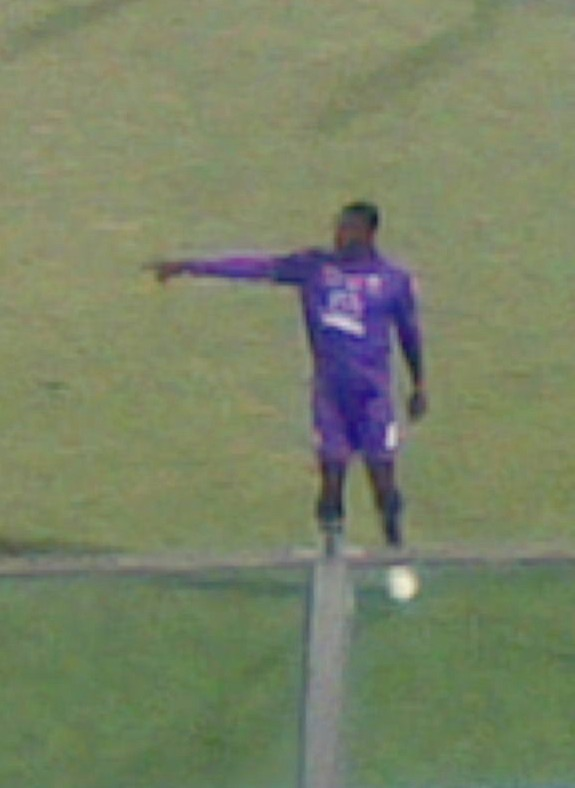

Personal information
- Date of birth: 17 November 1994 (age 31)
- Place of birth: Accra, Greater Accra, Ghana
- Height: 1.78 m (5 ft 10 in)
- Position: Defender

Team information
- Current team: Sliema Wanderers
- Number: 11

Youth career
- Triestina
- 2011–2013: Fiorentina

Senior career*
Years	Team	Apps	(Gls)
2011–2014	Fiorentina	0	(0)
2013–2014	→ Spezia	2	(0)
2014–2015	Latina	0	(0)
2015	→ Matera (loan)	5	(0)
2015–2017	Lucchese	20	(1)
2017	Fano	1	(0)
2018	Benevento	0	(0)
2018–	Sliema Wanderers	27	(1)
- * Club domestic league appearances and goals as of 18 August 2019 (UTC)

Nii Nortey Ashong (born November 17, 1994, in Accra) is a Ghanaian professional footballer who plays as a WW for Sliema Wanderers in the Maltese Premier League.

== Career ==
Ashong made his Coppa Italia debut for Fiorentina on November 24, 2011, in a match against Empoli. On 30 May 2012 Fiorentina pay 300.000 euro for the other part of the co-ownership by Triestina.

On 10 July 2013, Ashong completed a one-year loan transfer to Spezia.

At the end of season he moves to Latina.

== Career statistics ==
As of 10 February 2012

Club performance			League		Cup		Continental		Total	
Season	Club	League	Apps	Goals	Apps	Goals	Apps	Goals	Apps	Goals
Italy			League		Coppa Italia		Europe		Total	
2011–12	Fiorentina	Serie A	0	0	1	0	0	0	1	0
			League		Cup		Continental		Total	
Total	Italy		0	0	1	0	0	0	1	0
Career total			0	0	1	0	0	0	1	0
