= Sheldon Schuster =

American biochemist

Sheldon Mark Schuster
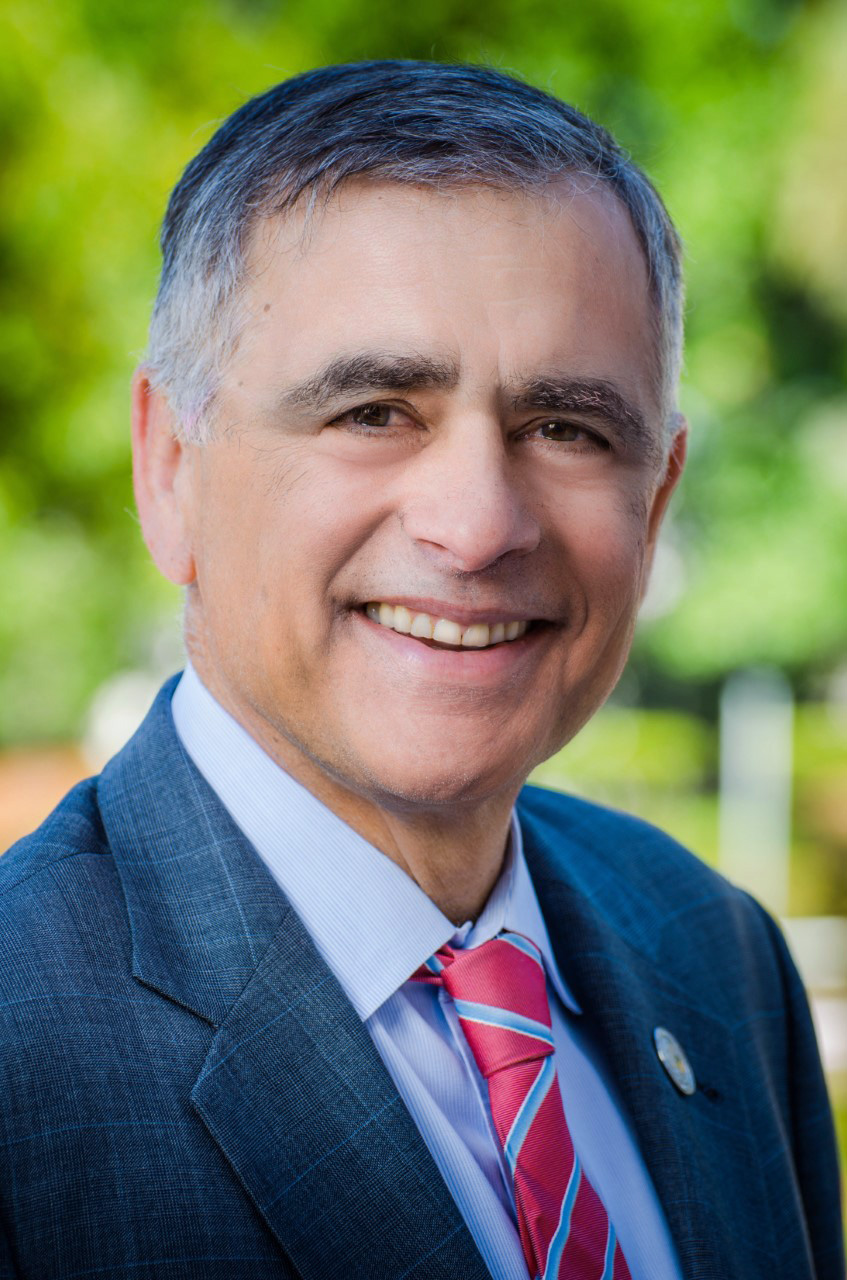
- Schuster in 2015

2nd President of Keck Graduate Institute
- In office July 15, 2003 – June 30, 2024
- Preceded by: Henry E. Riggs
- Succeeded by: Mohamed Abousalem

Personal details
- Born: 1947 San Mateo, California, U.S.
- Scientific career
- Education: University of California, Davis (BS); University of Arizona (PhD)
- Fields: Biochemistry and molecular biology
- Workplaces: Keck Graduate Institute; UF Brain Institute; University of Florida; University of Nebraska–Lincoln; University of Wisconsin-Madison
- Thesis: The Regulation of the Pyruvate Dehydrogenase Multienzyme Complex by Calcium and Magnesium in Heart Mitochondrial Systems (1974)
- Doctoral advisor: Merle S. Olson

Sheldon M. Schuster (born 1947) is an American biochemist, cancer researcher and academic. He served as president of Keck Graduate Institute from 2003–2024. He previously served as a professor at University of Nebraska–Lincoln and University of Florida. While at Florida, he was the director of research and the university's biotechnology program.

== Early life ==
Schuster was born in 1947 in San Francisco Bay Area, California where he was also raised.

He attended University of California, Davis, graduating with a bachelor's degree in biochemistry. He went on to attend a doctorate program at University of Arizona, graduating in 1974 with a PhD in biochemistry; after which, he conducted postdoctoral research at the University of Wisconsin Institute for Enzyme Research.

== Career ==
In 1976, Schuster began teaching chemistry and biology at the University of Nebraska–Lincoln. He continued teaching at the university until 1988, when he left to join the faculty of University of Florida.

Schuster became a professor of biochemistry and molecular biology at University of Florida in 1989. In 1992, he went on to become the director of the biotechnology program and also served as the assistant VP of research at the University of Florida (UF).

In 2000, while working at the UF Brain Institute, Weihong Tan, Schuster, Jeffery Li and Xiaohong Fang published a study on a synthetic DNA that acts like a photophore. The molecule, which illuminates when exposed to particular other molecules, can potentially be used to detect specific proteins or genes, which could allow for the detection of certain diseases.

On July 15, 2003, Schuster became the second president of Keck Graduate Institute (KGI), taking over for the founding president of the institute, Henry E. Riggs. According to the National Research Council, Schuster helped expand KGI's Professional Science Master's Degree program "to include new centers focused on bioprocessing, rare diseases, and biomarkers." Schuster served as president at KGI for 21 years and retired in 2024.

He is currently one of the editors of the Biochemistry and Molecular Biology Education journal and a fellow of the American Association for the Advancement of Science. He has co-founded two pharmaceutical companies, AquaGene and Restoragen (previously known as BioNebraska). Schuster also serves as the vice chairman for the National Organization for Rare Disorders.

== Published work ==
- Schuster, Sheldon M. (1974). The Regulation of the Pyruvate Dehydrogenase Multienzyme Complex by Calcium and Magnesium in Heart Mitochondrial Systems (Ph.D. thesis). University of Arizona. hdl:10150/288235. OCLC 1118678641. ProQuest 302736512.
- Schuster, Sheldon M.; Olson, Merle S. (1974-11-25). "Studies of the Energy-dependent Uptake of Divalent Metal Ions by Beef Heart Mitochondria". Journal of Biological Chemistry. 249 (22): 7151–7158. doi:10.1016/S0021-9258(19)42086-3. PMID 4474172.
- Schuster, S. M.; Ebel, R. E.; Lardy, H. A. (1975-10-10). "Kinetic studies on rat liver and beef heart mitochondrial ATPase. Evidence for nucleotide binding at separate regulatory and catalytic sites". Journal of Biological Chemistry. 250 (19): 7848–7853. doi:10.1016/S0021-9258(19)40893-4. PMID 126241.
- Arpaia, E.; Dumbrille-Ross, A.; Maler, T.; Neote, K.; Tropak, M.; Troxel, C.; Schuster, S. M.; Clarke, J. T. R.; Gravel, R. A. (1988-05-05). "Identification of an altered splice site in Ashkenazi Tay–Sachs disease". Nature. 333 (6168): 85–86. Bibcode:1988Natur.333...85A. doi:10.1038/333085a0. PMID 3362213. S2CID 4273187.
- Chakrabarti, R.; Wylie, D. E.; Schuster, S. M. (1989-09-15). "Transfer of monoclonal antibodies into mammalian cells by electroporation". Journal of Biological Chemistry. 264 (26): 15494–15500. doi:10.1016/S0021-9258(19)84857-3. PMID 2768274.
- Fang, Xiaohong; Liu, Xiaojing; Schuster, Sheldon; Tan, Weihong (1999-03-01). "Designing a Novel Molecular Beacon for Surface-Immobilized DNA Hybridization Studies". Journal of the American Chemical Society. 121 (12): 2921–2922. Bibcode:1999JAChS.121.2921F. doi:10.1021/ja9837809. S2CID 95972270.
- Li, Jianwei Jeffery; Fang, Xiaohong; Schuster, Sheldon M.; Tan, Weihong (2000-03-17). "Molecular Beacons: A Novel Approach to Detect Protein – DNA Interactions". Angewandte Chemie. 112 (6): 1091–1094. Bibcode:2000AngCh.112.1091L. doi:10.1002/(sici)1521-3757(20000317)112:6<1091::aid-ange1091>3.0.co;2-t.
- Ando, Miki; Sugimoto, Koichi; Kitoh, Toshiyuki; Sasaki, Makoto; Mukai, Kouichi; Ando, Jun; Egashira, Motoki; Schuster, Sheldon M.; Oshimi, Kazuo (2005-09-01). "Selective apoptosis of natural killer-cell tumours by l-asparaginase". British Journal of Haematology. 130 (6): 860–868. doi:10.1111/j.1365-2141.2005.05694.x. PMID 16156856. S2CID 9164321.

== Sources ==
- "Cancer Researchers Say Cigarette Taxes Needed". Trend Magazine. 1984-01-24. p. 1. ProQuest 401215294.
- Hagy, J. R. (1990). "Catching a Glimpse of the Future". Florida Trend Magazine. Vol. 32, no. 13. p. 11. ProQuest 212298002.
- "Three set to interview for UNL vice chancellor position". Lincoln Journal Star. 2001-01-31. p. B5. ProQuest 247999932.
- Hong, Peter Y. (2003-06-12). "Scientist Named Keck Graduate Institute President". Los Angeles Times.
- National Research Council; et al. (2012-09-14). From Science to Business: Preparing Female Scientists and Engineers for Successful Transitions into Entrepreneurship: Summary of a Workshop (PDF). National Academies Press. p. 47. ISBN 9780309256094.

Academic offices
Preceded by Henry E. Riggs	2nd President of Keck Graduate Institute; 2003–present	Incumbent
