= Matteo Gasperi =

Italian footballer

Personal information
- Date of birth: 17 July 1997 (age 29)
- Place of birth: Forlì, Italy
- Height: 1.84 m (6 ft 0 in)
- Position: Midfielder

Youth career
- Cesena

Senior career*
Years	Team	Apps	(Gls)
2015–2018	Cesena	1	(0)
2017	→ Fermana (loan)	3	(0)
2018	→ Fano (loan)	7	(0)
2018–2019	San Marino	32	(5)
2019–2020	Virtus Verona	7	(0)
2020	Südtirol	2	(0)
2020–2021	Legnago	19	(0)
2021–2022	Ancona-Matelica	31	(0)
2022–2023	Monterosi	26	(0)
2023–2024	Renate	22	(0)
2024–2025	Union Clodiense Chioggia	11	(0)
2025–2026	Desenzano	28	(3)
- * Club domestic league appearances and goals as of 2 May 2026

Matteo Gasperi (born 17 July 1997) is an Italian footballer who plays as a midfielder.

== Club career ==
He made his Serie B debut for Cesena on 23 January 2016 in a game against Virtus Entella.

On 16 July 2019, he joined Virtus Verona.

On 31 January 2020, he signed a 1.5-year contract with Südtirol with an option to extend for another season.

On 23 September 2020, he moved to Legnago.

On 11 July 2021, he joined Ancona-Matelica.

On 8 July 2022, Gasperi signed with Monterosi.
