= Mirko Schuster =

German footballer (born 1994)

Personal information
- Date of birth: 21 July 1994 (age 32)
- Place of birth: Mannheim, Germany
- Height: 1.87 m (6 ft 2 in)
- Position: Defender

Team information
- Current team: Eintracht Trier
- Number: 37

Youth career
- –2007: Waldhof Mannheim
- 2007–2013: Karlsruher SC

Senior career*
| Years | Team | Apps | (Gls) |
| 2013–2015 | Karlsruher SC II | 21 | (0) |
| 2015–2016 | Sonnenhof Großaspach | 17 | (0) |
| 2016–2017 | TSV Steinbach | 26 | (1) |
| 2017–2019 | Waldhof Mannheim | 38 | (1) |
| 2020 | VfB Oldenburg | 1 | (1) |
| 2020–2024 | SV Rödinghausen | 91 | (10) |
| 2024– | Eintracht Trier | 38 | (6) |
- * Club domestic league appearances and goals as of 26 June 2026

Mirko Schuster (born 21 July 1994) is a German footballer who plays as a defender for Regionalliga Südwest club Eintracht Trier.

== Career ==
Born in Mannheim, Schuster started out playing in the youth ranks of local side Waldhof Mannheim before moving to Karlsruher SC in 2007, where he played with the U17 and U19 teams. He trained with the first team during a ten-day camp in the summer of 2012.

In June 2013, Schuster was permanently promoted to the first team. Despite making several appearances on the bench, he never played a match for Karlsruher. Instead, Schuster made 21 appearances with the reserve team in the Oberliga Baden-Württemberg. In January 2014, he underwent multiple emergency surgeries after sustaining an injury to his right thigh during winter training camp in Belek, Turkey; he suffered from acute compartment syndrome and was forced to miss the remainder of the season.

Schuster made the move to 3. Liga side SG Sonnenhof Großaspach in January 2015, signing an 18-month contract. He finally made his senior debut on 14 February 2015, playing the full 90 minutes of a 1–1 draw against Hansa Rostock. Schuster made 17 appearances for Sonnenhof Großaspach.

In July 2016, Schuster joined Regionalliga side TSV Steinbach.

In 2019, Schuster suffered a scaphoid fracture in his left arm.

In 2024, Schuster signed a two-year contract (with a player option for a third year) with Regionalliga side Eintracht Trier, who needed a replacement midfielder following the retirement of club stalwart Maurice Roth. Schuster made his club debut against FC 08 Homburg, scoring a brace in a 4–1 win.
