= Mirco Severini =

Italian footballer

Personal information
- Date of birth: 21 April 1997 (age 29)
- Place of birth: Iesi, Italy
- Height: 1.79 m (5 ft 10 in)
- Position: Forward

Team information
- Current team: Atletico Ascoli

Youth career
- –2016: Cesena

Senior career*
Years	Team	Apps	(Gls)
2016–2017	Cesena	2	(0)
2017	→ Castelvetro (loan)	17	(6)
2017–2018	Ravenna	9	(0)
2018	→ Juve Stabia (loan)	1	(0)
2018–2019	Castelfidardo	23	(2)
2019	Matelica	5	(0)
2019–2020	Vigasio	9	(0)
2020–2022	Tolentino	63	(6)
2022–2023	Fano	29	(3)
2023–	Atletico Ascoli	4	(2)
- * Club domestic league appearances and goals as of 8 October 2023

Mirco Severini (born 21 April 1997) is an Italian football player who plays for Serie D club Atletico Ascoli.

== Club career ==
He made his Serie B debut for Cesena on 26 March 2016 in a game against Latina.
