= Geomatics =

Geographic data discipline

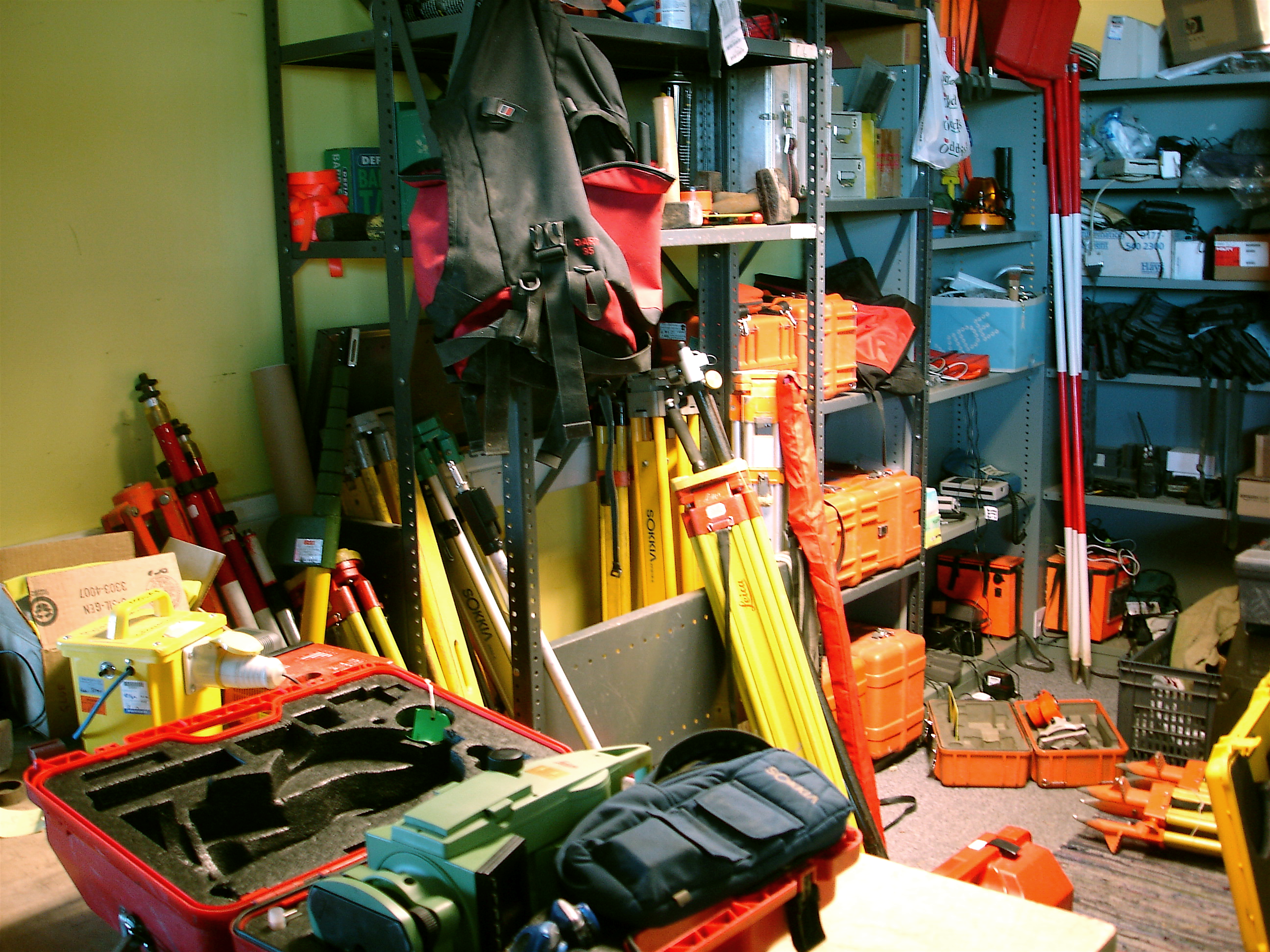
A surveyor's shed showing equipment used for geomatics

Geomatics is defined in the ISO/TC 211 series of standards as the "discipline concerned with the collection, distribution, storage, analysis, processing, presentation of geographic data or geographic information". Under another definition, it consists of products, services and tools involved in the collection, integration and management of geographic (geospatial) data.

== History and etymology ==
Surveying engineering was the common name used for geomatics engineering in the past. The term was placed by the UNESCO Encyclopedia of Life Support Systems under the branch of technical geography, which is geared towards interpreting and communicating spatial data. In Germany, "geodesy and geoinformatics" or "geodesy and geoinformation" is commonly used for describing this discipline. In addition, "geospatial engineering" or "geodetic and geoinformatic engineering" are alternative terms to "geomatic(s) engineering".

The term was proposed in French ("géomatique") at the end of the 1960s by scientist Bernard Dubuisson to reflect at the time recent changes in the jobs of surveyor and photogrammetrist. On June 1, 1971, 'geomatics' was first employed in a French Ministry of Public Works memorandum instituting a "standing committee of geomatics" in the government.

At the centennial congress of the Canadian Institute of Surveying (now known as the Canadian Institute of Geomatics) in April 1982, the new classification was further popularised in English by French-Canadian surveyor Michel Paradis in keynote address. Paradis claimed that at the end of the 20th century the needs for geographical information would reach a scope without precedent in history and that, in order to address these needs, it was necessary to integrate in a new discipline both the traditional disciplines of land surveying and the new tools and techniques of data capture, manipulation, storage and diffusion.

Evolving from its Canadian origins, the term has since been adopted by recognized governmental groups, like the International Organization for Standardization and the Royal Institution of Chartered Surveyors. Many other international authorities, such as those in the United States, have shown a preference for the term geospatial technology, which may be defined as a synonym of "geospatial information and communications technology".

== Types of geomatics ==
Geomatics is an umbrella term that includes the tools and techniques used to analyze the Earth's surface. These can range from land surveying, remote sensing, nautical charts, cartography, geographic information systems (GIS), and several other related forms of earth mapping. Some scientists and researchers intend to restrict geomatics to the perspective of surveying and engineering toward geographic information in order to avoid forming a vague concept. Geoinformatics and Geographic information science has been proposed as alternative comprehensive term; however, their popularity is, like geomatics, largely dependent on country.

=== Land surveying ===
The methodology of land surveying includes the measurement and analysis of points on the ground. These readings relay information regarding the angles, distances, and heights, of the points. It is often regarded as the art and science that helped established land boundaries that cultivated into current, legal property.

Land surveying is heavily involved with subdivision planning and design, civil engineering, and construction.

=== Geovisualization ===
Geovisualization combines both cartography and computer science to bring spatial data to life. The interactive tools and techniques used assist in supporting exploration and communicate a finished conclusion. As such, the process of knowledge construction is emphasized, unlike traditional maps. These can be presented in the form of 3D models, time-lapse animations, and manipulated images.

The computer processing involved allows users to quickly change visual parameters through filter data layers, which produces an image of higher clarity in relation to static, paper maps. In relation to geomatics, a geomatics engineer will gather raw data and geovisualization will make this information easily understandable.

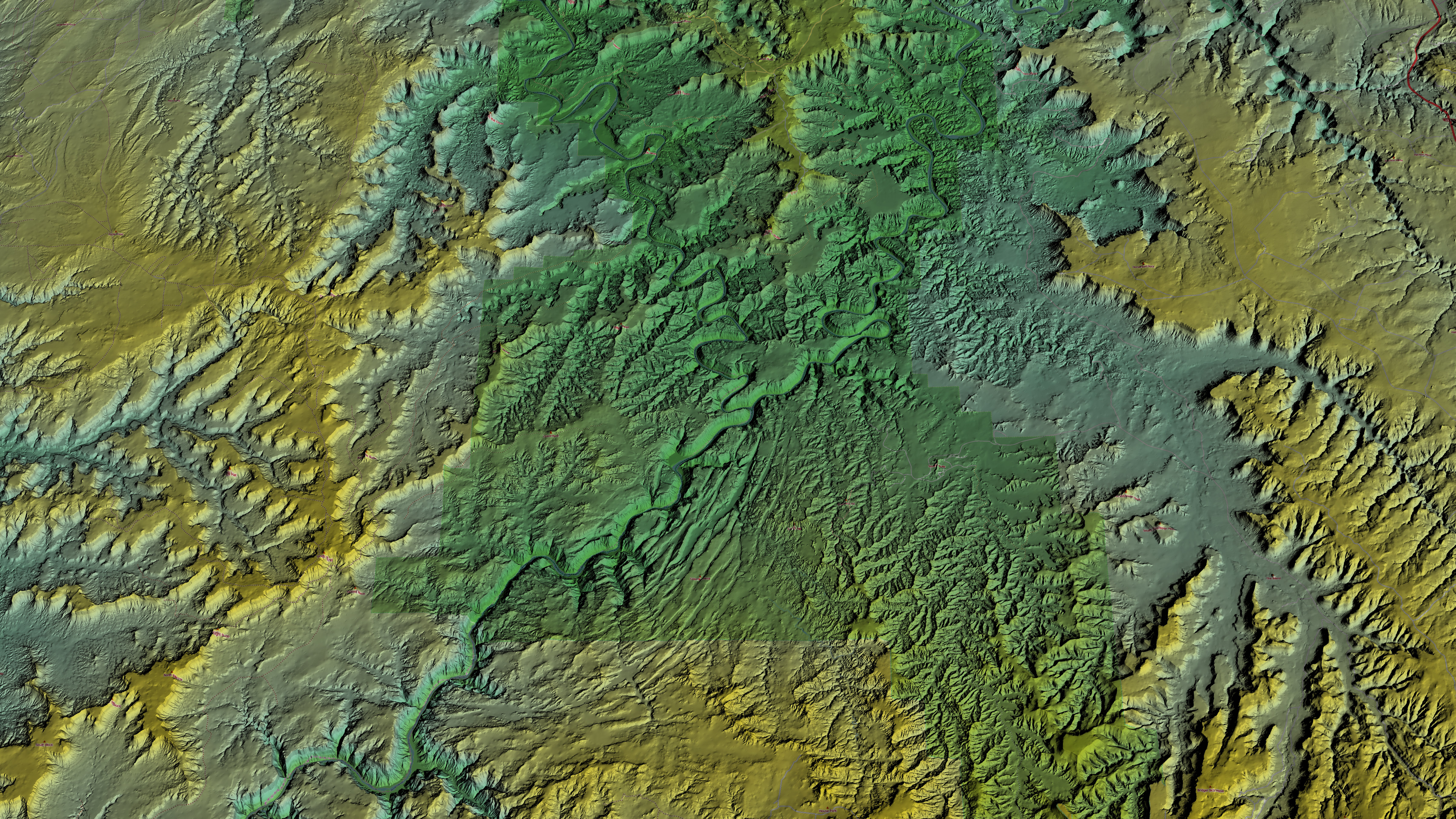
Image of the canyonlands generated using TruFlite and displays hues of green, blue, and yellow for elevation. - Martin D. Adamiker

=== Hydro geomatics ===
The related field of hydrogeomatics covers the area associated with surveying work carried out on, above, or below the surface of the sea or other areas of water. The subfield is otherwise, and more commonly, known as hydrography, which was coined in the mid-16th century.

One pioneer of hydro geomatics is Alexander Dalrymple, the first hydrographer and was appointed by the British navy in 1795. His job was to prep and print charts for travel, thus contributing to naval and merchant shipping. Dalrymple's history ties directly into the foundational militant ties that the field possesses, and its modern-day scope has widened to include more aspects of hydrogeography from military surveillance to oceanic habitat conservation. After the UK Hydrographic Office (UKHO) was founded in 1795, the U.S. Naval Observatory and Hydrographic Office (USNO) was officially instituted in 1854, paving the way for safe navigation, global shipping, and defense.

A U.S. governmental agency called the National Oceanic and Atmospheric Administration (NOAA) is one example of how hydro geomatics/hydrography is applied. Underwater topography (or bathymetry) is sought after, and common geomatics technology like multibeam sonars are used to accomplish seabed mapping.

=== Health geomatics ===
Health geomatics can improve our understanding of the important relationship between location and health, and thus assist us in Public Health tasks like disease prevention, and also in better healthcare service planning. An important area of research is the use of open data in planning lifesaving activities.

=== Mining geomatics ===
Mining geomatics is the branch of geomatics dedicated to mining. It focuses on acquiring, processing and analysing spatial data about objects and phenomena in mining environments to support monitoring, modelling, prediction, visualisation and decision-making in mining operations. Its development is increasingly linked with specialized education and the formation of professional competences adapted to the needs of modern mining.

A growing number of university departments which were once titled "surveying", "survey engineering" or "topographic science" have re-titled themselves using the terms "geomatics" or "geomatics engineering", while others have switched to program titles such as "spatial information technology", and similar names.

The rapid progress and increased visibility of geomatics since the 1990s has been made possible by advances in computer hardware, computer science, and software engineering, as well as by airborne and space observation remote-sensing technologies.

=== Global Navigation Satellite Systems (GNSS) ===
Global Satellite Navigation System (GNSS) orbits and comparison

Global navigation satellite systems are a collection of geospatial systems that provide global coverage. The technology has a variety of purposes from communications to mobile navigation. The six GNSS constellations in operation are the U.S. GPS Operational Constellation, GLObal NAvigation Satellite System (GLONASS) stemming from Russia, the European Galileo, China's BeiDou/Compass, Japan's Quasi-Zenith Satellite System (QZSS), and The Indian Regional Navigation Satellite System (IRNSS).

== Geomatics engineering ==
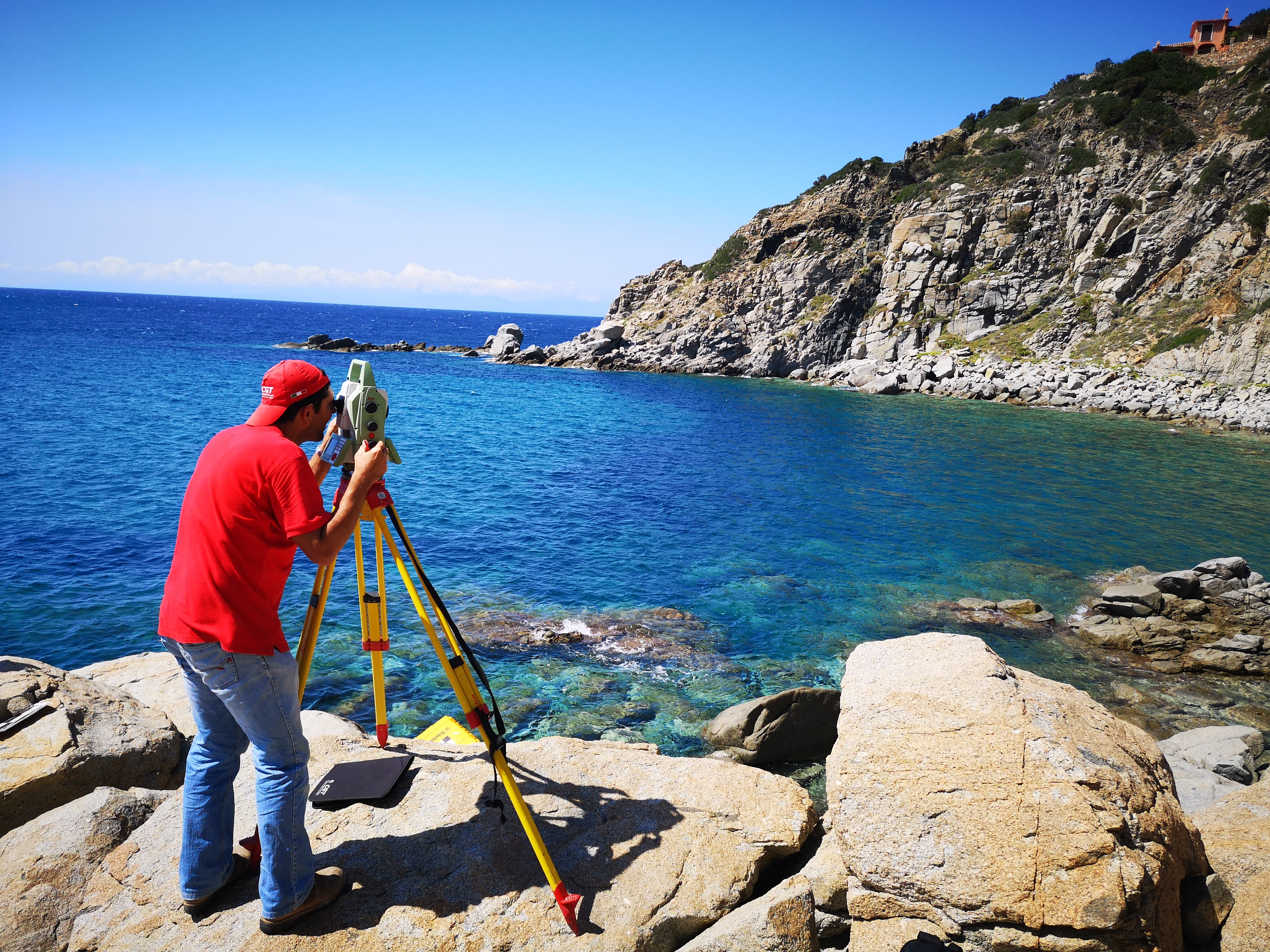
Surveyor using a total station

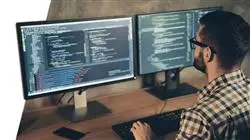
Geomatician

Geomatics engineering is a rapidly developing engineering discipline which focuses on spatial information (i.e. information that has a location). The location is the primary factor used to integrate a very wide range of data for spatial analysis and visualization. Geomatics engineers design, develop, and operate systems for collecting and analyzing spatial information about the land, the oceans, natural resources, and manmade features. Geomatics engineers or geomatician apply engineering principles to spatial information and implement relational data structures involving measurement sciences, thus using geomatics and acting as spatial information engineers. They sit at the nexus of geography and computer science. A geomatician practices geomatics, by combining "geo", (the earth) with information and automation.

Geomatics engineers manage local, regional, national and global spatial data infrastructures. Geomatics engineering also involves aspects of Computer Engineering, Software Engineering and Civil Engineering. Geomatic engineers acquire, measure, create, and process data using a geographic information system (GIS) and then model phenomena associated with places. Geomaticians have alternative titles, including Geographic Information System (GIS) technologist, spatial data analyst, city/urban planner and cartographer.

Geomaticians are often found working in the public sector, in land registry, urban planning departments where they are involved in surveying and cadastral mapping. They also work in the private sector, in mapping companies, publishing houses or in remote sensing companies.

=== Required skills ===
Geomaticians handle the entire value chain associated with processing geodata. Their work begins with data collection and acquisition. Geomatics specialists must be able to distinguish between topographic methods (e.g., total station or differential GPS) (which involve going to the point to be measured) and remote sensing methods (e.g., photogrammetry or lidar) (remote measurement). They must also be able to perform planimetric measurements (x, y or latitude, longitude), altimetric surveys (z or H), or satellite telemetry measurements (analysis of measurements taken from space). The collected data is then cleaned and made available for further processing.

=== Education ===
Geomaticians are responsible for verifying the accuracy (spatial and temporal), completeness, and, if verification is impossible (e.g., inaccessible terrain), the plausibility of geodata. Despite attempts at automation, they are still called to calculate the location and the geographic coordinate system, then at least two coordinates: latitude and longitude, and sometimes altitude of entities (points, lines, areas) and their associated attributes (e.g., their nature, area, volume, population, and whether or not they are connected to a drinking water network). Their geodata then undergoes processing and analysis to create data models and thus databases. If necessary, the data is formatted (selection of scale, colors, line thicknesses, and legend) to create maps.

Skilled geomaticians are in short supply, and there are not sufficient professionals in the pipeline who can distinguish between different data exchange formats, convert them, and evaluate, interpret, and merge data from various sources.

=== Spatial statistics ===
The work of geomatics engineers includes the analysis of spatial data and statistics. This information models "spatially-indexed dependence structures", which combats the idea of an independent and identically distributed set of data. It is also known as geospatial analytics, and is the information pertaining to a specific location in geospace. The analysis done by geomatics engineers in this field provides actionable insight in accordance to what is being examined.

=== Subdivision planning ===
Working alongside civil engineers, geomatics engineers will utilize the GNSS and high precision instruments to determine legal and geographic boundaries of an area. The raw data is processed through a Geographic Information System (GIS) database, which will then be used as a source by a team.

To assess the most optimal layout, the proposed design is run through constraint data such as floodplains, wetlands, and steep slopes. A Subdivision Plat is prepared, which is the legally recorded map illustrating boundaries, dimensions, and associated partitions.

== Impact ==
Geomatics and the technology associated with it has made several breakthroughs in climate change efforts, population health, and oceanic activities. This application is especially evident in the use of photogrammetry, where images utilized by geomatics can be turned into 3D models. Furthermore, data from geospatial techniques are employed for governmental use to ameliorate the issues on Earth's surface.

=== Sustainability ===
The ability to interpret geodata is pushing companies in the industry to achieve net-zero emissions. Agreements and plans across the globe promote climate neutrality such as the Sustainable Developmental Goals (SDGs) and the various editions of the United Nations Climate Change conference series.

The Earth Archive Initiative, launched by Christopher Fisher, aims to create a digital baseline of Earth and mitigate the climate crisis. LiDAR, a remote sensing technology, will be used to carry out scans of the planet's landmass, which estimates to about 30% of the Earth's surface area. The LiDAR scans would provide a dataset of present data available and the Earth's future state. Doing so will assist in understanding and combating the climate change crisis with a visual representation.

== See also ==
- Geographic Information Science
- Geoinformatics
