= 2015–16 in Italian football =

Football in Italy
- Season: 2015–16

Men's football
- Serie A: Juventus
- Serie B: Cagliari
- Coppa Italia: Juventus
- Supercoppa Italiana: Juventus

The 2015–16 season was the 114th season of competitive football in Italy.

== Promotions and relegations (pre-season) ==
Teams promoted to Serie A

- Carpi
- Frosinone
- Bologna

Teams relegated from Serie A

- Cagliari
- Cesena
- Parma

Teams promoted to Serie B

- Novara
- Teramo
- Salernitana
- Como

Teams relegated from Serie B

- Catania
- Cittadella
- Brescia
- Varese

== National teams ==
=== Italy national football team ===
==== UEFA Euro 2016 qualifying ====
Pos	Team	Pld	W	D	L	GF	GA	GD	Pts	Qualification
1	Italy	10	7	3	0	16	7	+9	24	Qualify for final tournament
2	Croatia (Note: Croatia were deducted one point after charges for racist behaviour in the home match against Italy.)	10	6	3	1	20	5	+15	20	Qualify for final tournament
3	Norway	10	6	1	3	13	10	+3	19	Advance to play-offs
4	Bulgaria	10	3	2	5	9	12	−3	11	
5	Azerbaijan	10	1	3	6	7	18	−11	6	
6	Malta	10	0	2	8	3	16	−13	2	

Source: UEFA
Rules for classification: Qualification tiebreakers
Notes:
12 June 2015
20:45
(20:45 UTC+2)

Croatia	1–1	Italy
Mandžukić 11'	Report	Candreva 36' (pen.)

Stadion Poljud, Split
Attendance: 0 (Note: Due to punishment handed by UEFA for crowd trouble in their home match against Norway on 28 March 2015, Croatia must play their next home qualifying game behind closed doors, and the Croatian FA were fined €50,000.)
Referee: Martin Atkinson (England)
3 September 2015
20:45
(20:45 UTC+2)

Italy	1–0	Malta
Pellè 69'	Report

Stadio Artemio Franchi, Florence
Attendance: 12,551
Referee: Ivan Kružliak (Slovakia)
6 September 2015
20:45
(20:45 UTC+2)

Italy	1–0	Bulgaria
De Rossi 6' (pen.)	Report

Stadio Renzo Barbera, Palermo
Attendance: 21,000
Referee: Sergei Karasev (Russia)
10 October 2015
18:00
(21:00 UTC+5)

Azerbaijan	1–3	Italy
Nazarov 31'	Report	Éder 11'; El Shaarawy 43'; Darmian 65'

National Stadium, Baku
Attendance: 48,000
Referee: Willie Collum (Scotland)
13 October 2015
20:45
(20:45 UTC+2)

Italy	2–1	Norway
Florenzi 73'; Pellè 82'	Report	Tettey 23'

Stadio Olimpico, Rome
Attendance: 30,000
Referee: Felix Brych (Germany)

==== Friendlies ====
31 March 2015 Friendly	Italy	1–1	England	Turin, Italy
20:45 CEST (UTC+02:00)	Pellè 29'	Report	Townsend 79'	Stadium: Juventus Stadium; Attendance: 31,138; Referee: Felix Brych (Germany)

16 June 2015 Friendly	Italy	0–1	Portugal	Geneva, Switzerland
		Report	Éder 52'	Stadium: Stade de Genève

13 November 2015 Friendly	Belgium	3–1	Italy	Brussels, Belgium
20:45 CEST (UTC+02:00)	Vertonghen 13', (yellow card) 25'; Witsel (yellow card) 33'; De Bruyne 74'; Batshuayi 82'	Report	Candreva 3'; Éder (yellow card) 27'; Chiellini (yellow card) 34'; Antonelli (yellow card) 90'	Stadium: King Baudouin Stadium; Referee: Szymon Marciniak (Poland)

17 November 2015 Friendly	Italy	2–2	Romania	Bologna, Italy
20:45 CEST (UTC+02:00)	Marchisio 55' (pen.); Éder (yellow card) 56'; Gabbiadini 66'; Candreva (yellow card) 90'	Report	Stancu 8'; Hoban (yellow card) 15'; Andone 89'; Chiricheș (yellow card) 90'	Stadium: Stadio Renato Dall'Ara; Attendance: 22,511; Referee: Adrien Jaccottet (Switzerland)

24 March 2016 Friendly	Italy	1–1	Spain	Udine, Italy
20:45 CET (UTC+01:00)	Insigne 68'	Report	Aduriz 70'	Stadium: Stadio Friuli; Attendance: 23,300; Referee: Deniz Aytekin (Germany)

29 March 2016 Friendly	Germany	4–1	Italy	Munich, Germany
20:45 CEST (UTC+02:00)	Kroos 24'; Götze 45'; Hector 59'; Özil 75' (pen.)	Report	El Shaarawy 83'	Stadium: Allianz Arena; Attendance: 62,653; Referee: Oliver Drachta (Austria)

== League season ==
=== Serie A ===
Pos	Team	Pld	W	D	L	GF	GA	GD	Pts	Qualification or relegation
1	Juventus (C)	38	29	4	5	75	20	+55	91	Qualification to Champions League group stage
2	Napoli	38	25	7	6	80	32	+48	82	Qualification to Champions League group stage
3	Roma	38	23	11	4	83	41	+42	80	Qualification to Champions League play-off round
4	Internazionale	38	20	7	11	50	38	+12	67	Qualification to Europa League group stage (Note: Since the winners of the 2015–16 Coppa Italia, Juventus, qualified for European competition based on league position, the spot awarded to the cup winners (Europa League group stage) was passed to fifth-placed team and the spot awarded to the fifth-placed team (Europa League third qualifying round) was passed to the sixth-placed team.)
5	Fiorentina	38	18	10	10	60	42	+18	64	Qualification to Europa League group stage
6	Sassuolo	38	16	13	9	49	40	+9	61	Qualification to Europa League third qualifying round
7	Milan	38	15	12	11	49	43	+6	57	
8	Lazio	38	15	9	14	52	52	0	54	
9	Chievo	38	13	11	14	43	45	−2	50	
10	Empoli	38	12	10	16	40	49	−9	46 (Note: Empoli ahead of Genoa on head-to-head goal difference; Empoli +1, Genoa –1.)	
11	Genoa	38	13	7	18	45	48	−3	46	
12	Torino	38	12	9	17	52	55	−3	45 (Note: Torino ahead of Atalanta on head-to-head points; Torino 6 points, Atalanta 0 points.)	
13	Atalanta	38	11	12	15	41	47	−6	45	
14	Bologna	38	11	9	18	33	45	−12	42	
15	Sampdoria	38	10	10	18	48	61	−13	40	
16	Palermo	38	10	9	19	38	65	−27	39 (Note: Palermo ahead of Udinese on head-to-head points; Palermo 6 points, Udinese 0 points.)	
17	Udinese	38	10	9	19	35	60	−25	39	
18	Carpi (R)	38	9	11	18	37	57	−20	38	Relegation to Serie B
19	Frosinone (R)	38	8	7	23	35	76	−41	31	Relegation to Serie B
20	Hellas Verona (R)	38	5	13	20	34	63	−29	28	Relegation to Serie B

Source: Serie A, Soccerway
Rules for classification: 1) Points; 2) Head-to-head points; 3) Head-to-head goal difference; 4) Goal difference; 5) Goals scored; 6) Draw.
(C) Champions; (R) Relegated

=== Serie B ===
Pos	Team	Pld	W	D	L	GF	GA	GD	Pts	Promotion, qualification or relegation
1	Cagliari (C, P)	42	25	8	9	78	41	+37	83	Promotion to Serie A
2	Crotone (P)	42	23	13	6	61	36	+25	82	Promotion to Serie A
3	Trapani	42	20	13	9	64	49	+15	73	Qualification to promotion play-offs semi-finals
4	Pescara (O, P)	42	21	9	12	69	52	+17	72	Qualification to promotion play-offs semi-finals
5	Bari	42	19	11	12	58	48	+10	68	Qualification to promotion play-offs preliminary round
6	Cesena (Note: Cesena at the beginning was deducted one point for financial irregularities, then the deduction was removed.)	42	19	11	12	57	37	+20	68	Qualification to promotion play-offs preliminary round
7	Spezia	42	17	15	10	47	45	+2	66	Qualification to promotion play-offs preliminary round
8	Novara (Note: Novara was deducted two points for administrative irregularities.)	42	19	10	13	57	35	+22	65	Qualification to promotion play-offs preliminary round
9	Virtus Entella	42	17	13	12	51	40	+11	64	
10	Perugia	42	14	13	15	40	40	0	55	
11	Brescia	42	14	12	16	55	64	−9	54	
12	Ternana	42	15	8	19	50	56	−6	53	
13	Vicenza	42	11	16	15	41	53	−12	49	
14	Avellino	42	13	10	19	52	66	−14	49	
15	Ascoli	42	13	8	21	45	64	−19	47	
16	Latina	42	10	16	16	44	51	−7	46	
17	Pro Vercelli	42	11	13	18	43	53	−10	46	
18	Salernitana (O)	42	9	18	15	48	62	−14	45	Relegation play-out
19	Virtus Lanciano (Note: Virtus Lanciano was deducted four points for financial irregularities.) (R, E, R, R)	42	12	12	18	43	56	−13	44	Bankruptcy after play-out
20	Livorno (R)	42	10	12	20	45	57	−12	42	Relegation to Lega Pro
21	Modena (R)	42	11	9	22	37	55	−18	42	Relegation to Lega Pro
22	Como (R)	42	5	18	19	39	64	−25	33	Relegation to Lega Pro

Source: Lega Serie B
(C) Champions; (E) Eliminated; (O) Play-off winners; (P) Promoted; (R) Relegated

=== Lega Pro ===
Group A
Pos	Team	Pld	Pts
1	Cittadella (C, P)	34	76
2	Pordenone	34	65
3	Bassano Virtus	34	62
4	Alessandria	34	57
5	Padova	34	54
6	Cremonese	34	53
7	Reggiana	34	52
8	Feralpisalò	34	50
9	Pavia (R)	34	49
10	Südtirol	34	44
11	Renate	34	43
12	Giana Erminio	34	42
13	Lumezzane	34	42
14	Pro Piacenza (O)	34	39
15	Mantova (O)	34	34
16	Cuneo (R)	34	34
17	AlbinoLeffe	34	20
18	Pro Patria (R)	34	7

Source: Lega Pro
(C) Champions;
(O) Play-off winners;
(P) Promoted;
(R) Relegated

Group B
Pos	Team	Pld	Pts
1	SPAL (C, P)	34	71
2	Pisa (O, P)	34	62
3	Maceratese	34	58
4	Ancona	34	53
5	Carrarese	34	51
6	Siena	34	46
7	Pontedera	34	45
8	Teramo	34	43
9	Arezzo	34	42
10	Tuttocuoio	34	40
11	Santarcangelo	34	39
12	Pistoiese	34	39
13	Lucchese	34	39
14	Prato (O)	34	37
15	Rimini (R)	34	36
16	L'Aquila (R)	34	33
17	Lupa Roma	34	27
18	Savona (R)	34	22

Source: Lega Pro
(C) Champions;
(O) Play-off winners;
(P) Promoted;
(R) Relegated

Group C
Pos	Team	Pld	Pts
1	Benevento (C, P)	34	70
2	Foggia	34	65
3	Lecce	34	63
4	Casertana	34	63
5	Cosenza	34	60
6	Matera	34	53
7	Fidelis Andria	34	45
8	Messina	34	45
9	Paganese	34	42
10	Juve Stabia	34	42
11	Catanzaro	34	41
12	Akragas	34	40
13	Catania	34	39
14	Monopoli (O)	34	39
15	Melfi	34	30
16	Martina Franca (R)	34	22
17	Ischia (R)	34	21
18	Lupa Castelli Romani	34	12

Source: Lega Pro
(C) Champions;
(O) Play-off winners;
(P) Promoted;
(R) Relegated

== Cup competitions ==
=== Supercoppa Italiana ===
8 August 2015
20:00 UTC+08:00

Juventus	2–0	Lazio
Mandžukić 69'; Dybala 73'	Report

Shanghai Stadium, Shanghai, China
Attendance: 30,000
Referee: Luca Banti

Juventus	Lazio

GK	1	(Italy) Gianluigi Buffon (c)
CB	15	(Italy) Andrea Barzagli
CB	19	(Italy) Leonardo Bonucci
CB	4	(Uruguay) Martín Cáceres
RWB	26	(Switzerland) Stephan Lichtsteiner
LWB	33	(France) Patrice Evra
RM	27	(Italy) Stefano Sturaro	(substituted off) 90'
CM	8	(Italy) Claudio Marchisio
LM	10	(France) Paul Pogba
CF	11	(France) Kingsley Coman	(substituted off) 61'
CF	17	(Croatia) Mario Mandžukić	(substituted off) 80'
Substitutes:
GK	25	(Brazil) Neto
GK	34	(Brazil) Rubinho
DF	2	(Chile) Mauricio Isla
DF	24	(Italy) Daniele Rugani
DF	42	(Italy) Giulio Parodi
MF	20	(Italy) Simone Padoin
MF	37	(Argentina) Roberto Pereyra	(substituted on) 90'
MF	40	(Italy) Mattia Vitale
MF	43	(Colombia) Andrés Tello
FW	7	(Italy) Simone Zaza
FW	14	(Spain) Fernando Llorente	(substituted on) 80'
FW	21	(Argentina) Paulo Dybala	(substituted on) 61'
Manager:
(Italy) Massimiliano Allegri

GK	22	(Italy) Federico Marchetti
RB	26	(Romania) Ștefan Radu
CB	6	(Argentina) Santiago Gentiletti
CB	3	(Netherlands) Stefan de Vrij
LB	8	(Serbia) Dušan Basta
RM	32	(Italy) Danilo Cataldi	(substituted off) 75'
CM	20	(Argentina) Lucas Biglia (c)
LM	23	(Nigeria) Ogenyi Onazi
AM	10	(Brazil) Felipe Anderson	(substituted off) 87'
AM	87	(Italy) Antonio Candreva
CF	11	(Germany) Miroslav Klose	(substituted off) 61'
Substitutes:
GK	55	(Italy) Guido Guerrieri
GK	99	(Albania) Etrit Berisha
DF	2	(Netherlands) Wesley Hoedt
DF	4	(Spain) Patric
DF	29	(France) Abdoulay Konko
DF	33	(Brazil) Maurício
MF	7	(England) Ravel Morrison	(substituted on) 87'
MF	21	(Serbia) Sergej Milinković-Savić
MF	70	(Australia) Chris Ikonomidis
FW	9	(Serbia) Filip Đorđević	(substituted on) 61'
FW	14	(Senegal) Keita
FW	88	(Netherlands) Ricardo Kishna	(substituted on) 75'
Manager:
(Italy) Stefano Pioli

=== Coppa Italia ===
21 May 2016
20:45 CEST (UTC+2)

Milan	0–1 (a.e.t.)	Juventus
	Report	Morata 110'

Stadio Olimpico, Rome
Referee: Gianluca Rocchi

Milan	Juventus

GK	99	(Italy) Gianluigi Donnarumma
RB	96	(Italy) Davide Calabria
CB	17	(Colombia) Cristián Zapata	(yellow card) 50'
CB	13	(Italy) Alessio Romagnoli
LB	2	(Italy) Mattia De Sciglio
DM	18	(Italy) Riccardo Montolivo (c)		(substituted off) 108'
CM	27	(Slovakia) Juraj Kucka		(substituted off) 112'
CM	16	(Italy) Andrea Poli		(substituted off) 84'
RW	10	(Japan) Keisuke Honda	(yellow card) 88'
CF	70	(Colombia) Carlos Bacca
LW	28	(Italy) Giacomo Bonaventura
Substitutes:
GK	1	(Spain) Diego López
DF	4	(Italy) José Mauri	(yellow card) 119'	(substituted on) 108'
DF	5	(France) Philippe Mexès
FW	7	(France) Jérémy Ménez
FW	9	(Brazil) Luiz Adriano
FW	19	(France) M'Baye Niang	(yellow card) 101'	(substituted on) 84'
GK	32	(Italy) Christian Abbiati
DF	33	(Brazil) Alex
FW	45	(Italy) Mario Balotelli		(substituted on) 112'
MF	72	(Ghana) Kevin-Prince Boateng
MF	73	(Italy) Manuel Locatelli
MF	91	(Italy) Andrea Bertolacci
Manager:
(Italy) Cristian Brocchi

GK	25	(Brazil) Neto
CB	24	(Italy) Daniele Rugani	(yellow card) 120+2'
CB	15	(Italy) Andrea Barzagli	(yellow card) 105'
CB	3	(Italy) Giorgio Chiellini (c)	(yellow card) 117'
RWB	26	(Switzerland) Stephan Lichtsteiner		(substituted off) 75'
CM	18	(Gabon) Mario Lemina
CM	11	(Brazil) Hernanes		(substituted off) 108'
CM	10	(France) Paul Pogba	(yellow card) 62'
LWB	33	(France) Patrice Evra		(substituted off) 62'
CF	21	(Argentina) Paulo Dybala
CF	17	(Croatia) Mario Mandžukić
Substitutes:
GK	1	(Italy) Gianluigi Buffon
FW	7	(Italy) Simone Zaza
FW	9	(Spain) Álvaro Morata	(yellow card) 119'	(substituted on) 108'
DF	12	(Brazil) Alex Sandro		(substituted on) 62'
FW	16	(Colombia) Juan Cuadrado		(substituted on) 75'
MF	20	(Italy) Simone Padoin
MF	22	(Ghana) Kwadwo Asamoah
MF	27	(Italy) Stefano Sturaro
GK	34	(Brazil) Rubinho
MF	37	(Argentina) Roberto Pereyra
Manager:
(Italy) Massimiliano Allegri

Match rules

- 90 minutes.
- 30 minutes of extra time if necessary.
- Penalty shoot-out if scores still level.
