= 2015–16 SS Lazio season =

Lazio
2015–16 season
- President: Claudio Lotito
- Manager: Stefano Pioli (until 3 April 2016); Simone Inzaghi (from 3 April 2016)
- Stadium: Stadio Olimpico
- Serie A: 8th
- Supercoppa Italiana: Runners-up
- Coppa Italia: Quarter-finals
- UEFA Champions League: Play-off round
- UEFA Europa League: Round of 16
- Top goalscorer: League: Antonio Candreva (10); All: Antonio Candreva (12)
- Highest home attendance: 38,917 vs Bayer Leverkusen (18 August 2015, Champions League)
- Lowest home attendance: 1,970 vs Udinese (17 December 2015, Coppa Italia)
- Average home league attendance: 21,025
- Biggest win: 5–2 vs Verona; 4–1 vs Chievo; 3–0 vs Torino; 3–0 vs Palermo
- Biggest defeat: 0–5 vs Napoli
Home colours	Away colours	Third colours

The 2015–16 season was Società Sportiva Lazio's 116th since their founding and the club's 28th consecutive season in the top-flight of Italian football. The club competed in Serie A, the Coppa Italia, the UEFA Champions League, and the UEFA Europa League. Having finished 3rd the previous season, Lazio began in the play-off round but failed to qualify after a 3–1 loss on aggregate against Bayer Leverkusen.

== Players ==
=== Squad information ===
As of 13 January 2016

Note: Flags indicate national team as defined under FIFA eligibility rules; some limited exceptions apply. Players may hold more than one non-FIFA nationality.

No.	Pos.	Nation	Player
2	DF	NED	Wesley Hoedt
3	DF	NED	Stefan de Vrij
4	DF	ESP	Patric
5	DF	NED	Edson Braafheid
6	MF	ITA	Stefano Mauri
7	MF	ENG	Ravel Morrison
8	DF	SRB	Dušan Basta
9	FW	SRB	Filip Đorđević
10	MF	BRA	Felipe Anderson
11	FW	GER	Miroslav Klose
13	DF	SRB	Milan Biševac
14	FW	SEN	Keita Baldé
16	MF	ITA	Marco Parolo
17	FW	ITA	Alessandro Matri (on loan from Milan)

No.	Pos.	Nation	Player
18	DF	ARG	Santiago Gentiletti
19	MF	BIH	Senad Lulić
20	MF	ARG	Lucas Biglia (captain)
21	MF	SRB	Sergej Milinković-Savić
22	GK	ITA	Federico Marchetti
23	MF	NGR	Ogenyi Onazi
26	DF	ROU	Ștefan Radu (vice-captain)
29	DF	FRA	Abdoulay Konko
32	MF	ITA	Danilo Cataldi
33	DF	BRA	Maurício
87	MF	ITA	Antonio Candreva
88	FW	NED	Ricardo Kishna
99	GK	ALB	Etrit Berisha

== Transfers ==
=== In ===
Date	Pos.	Player	Age	Moving from	Fee	Notes	Source
21 January 2015	DF	(Netherlands) Wesley Hoedt	20	(Netherlands) AZ	Free		
15 February 2015	MF	(England) Ravel Morrison	22	(England) West Ham United	Free		
9 June 2015	MF	(Spain) Patric	22	(Spain) Barcelona	Free		
1 July 2015	DF	(Serbia) Dušan Basta	30	(Italy) Udinese	€5M		
1 July 2015	DF	(Brazil) Maurício	26	(Portugal) Sporting CP	€2.65M		
1 July 2015	DF	(Italy) Riccardo Serpieri	21	(Italy) Cosenza	Free		
1 July 2015	DF	(Croatia) Franjo Prce	19	(Italy) Lazio Primavera	Free	Youth Academy	
1 July 2015	MF	(Australia) Christopher Ikonomidis	20	(Italy) Lazio Primavera	Free	Youth Academy	
1 July 2015	MF	(Italy) Alessandro Murgia	18	(Italy) Lazio Primavera	Free	Youth Academy	
28 July 2015	FW	(Netherlands) Ricardo Kishna	20	(Netherlands) Ajax	€4M		
6 August 2015	MF	(Serbia) Sergej Milinković-Savić	20	(Belgium) Genk	€9M		
6 January 2016	DF	(Serbia) Milan Biševac	32	(France) Lyon	Undisclosed		

==== Loans in ====
Date	Pos.	Player	Age	Moving from	Fee	Notes	Source
31 August 2015	FW	(Italy) Alessandro Matri	31	(Italy) Milan	Loan		

=== Out ===
Date	Pos.	Player	Age	Moving to	Fee	Notes	Source
24 June 2015	DF	(Argentina) Diego Novaretti	30	(Mexico) Club León	Released		
12 July 2015	DF	(Belgium) Luis Pedro Cavanda	24	(Turkey) Trabzonspor	Undisclosed		
15 July 2015	MF	(Portugal) Bruno Pereirinha	27	(Brazil) Atlético Paranaense	Free		
19 July 2015	DF	(France) Michaël Ciani	31	(Portugal) Sporting CP	Free Agent		
19 July 2015	MF	(Brazil) Ederson	29	(Brazil) Flamengo	Mutual Consent		
12 August 2015	FW	(Italy) Ettore Mendicino	25	(Italy) Siena	Undisclosed		
12 August 2015	MF	(Italy) Enrico Zampa	23	(Italy) Ternana	Undisclosed		
31 August 2015	MF	(Albania) Lorik Cana	32	(France) Nantes	Undisclosed		

==== Loans out ====
Date	Pos.	Player	Age	Moving to	Fee	Notes	Source
25 June 2015	DF	(Croatia) Josip Elez	21	(Denmark) Aarhus	Loan		
6 July 2015	MF	(Cameroon) Joseph Minala	18	(Italy) Latina	Loan		
9 July 2015	DF	(Italy) Gianluca Pollace	19	(Italy) Salernitana	Loan		
31 August 2015	FW	(Italy) Cristiano Lombardi	20	(Italy) Ancona	Loan	Loan until the end of the season	
10 January 2016	MF	(Australia) Chris Ikonomidis	20	(Italy) Salernitana	Loan		

== Pre-season and friendlies ==
12 July 2015 Friendly	Lazio	14–0	C.S. Auronzo	Auronzo di Cadore
17:00 CEST (UTC+02:00)	Perea 5', 64', 90'; Keita 27', 53', 67', 82'; Bettina 30' (o.g.); Morrison 36', 41'; Đorđević 45'; Patric 69'; Gentiletti 76' (pen.); Ikonomidis 80'	Report		Stadium: Stadio Rodolfo Zandegiacomo; Referee: Mattia Dal Pan

15 July 2015 Friendly	Lazio	9–1	Top 11 Radio Club 103	Auronzo di Cadore
17:00 CEST (UTC+02:00)	Morrison 43', 57'; Đorđević 54'; Felipe Anderson 65', 72'; Klose 73'; Hoedt 78'; Lulić 82'; Basta 90+1'	Report	Vedana 88'	Stadium: Stadio Rodolfo Zandegiacomo; Referee: Davide Santarossa

18 July 2015 Friendly	Lazio	0–1	Vicenza	Auronzo di Cadore
17:00 CEST (UTC+02:00)		Report	Vita 68'	Stadium: Stadio Rodolfo Zandegiacomo; Referee: Zanonato

19 July 2015 Friendly	Anderlecht (Belgium)	3–1	(Italy) Lazio	Anderlecht, Belgium
18:00 CEST (UTC+02:00)	Sylla 19'; Gillet (yellow card) 13', (goal) 25'; Suárez 34' (pen.); Proto (yellow card) 44'	Report	Braafheid (yellow card) 21'; Đorđević 80'	Stadium: Constant Vanden Stock Stadium; Referee: Sebastien Delferiere

26 July 2015 Friendly	Sigma Olomouc (Czech Republic)	3–2	(Italy) Lazio	Olomouc, Czech Republic
18:30 CEST (UTC+02:00)	Habusta (yellow card) 45'; Jemelka 47'; Hladik 51'; Ševčík 76'	Report	Gentiletti (yellow card) 24'; Candreva (yellow card) 32'; Đorđević 40'; Maurício (yellow card) 69'; Keita 90+2'	Stadium: Andrův Stadion; Referee: Markus Hameter

29 July 2015 Friendly	Mainz 05 (Germany)	3–0	(Italy) Lazio	Mainz, Germany
19:30 CEST (UTC+02:00)	Joo-Ho Park (yellow card) 20'; Mallı 43'; Samperio 48'; Bell (yellow card) 57'; Clemens 69'	Report	Lulić (yellow card) 27'	Stadium: Bruchwegstadion; Referee: Jochen Drees

== Competitions ==
=== Supercoppa Italiana ===
8 August 2015	Juventus	2–0	Lazio	Shanghai, China
14:00 CEST (UTC+02:00)	Mandžukić 69'; Dybala 73'	Report		Stadium: Shanghai Stadium; Attendance: 30,000; Referee: Luca Banti

=== Serie A ===
==== League table ====
Pos	Team	Pld	W	D	L	GF	GA	GD	Pts	Qualification or relegation
6	Sassuolo	38	16	13	9	49	40	+9	61	Qualification to Europa League third qualifying round
7	Milan	38	15	12	11	49	43	+6	57	
8	Lazio	38	15	9	14	52	52	0	54	
9	Chievo	38	13	11	14	43	45	−2	50	
10	Empoli	38	12	10	16	40	49	−9	46 (Note: Empoli ahead of Genoa on head-to-head goal difference; Empoli +1, Genoa –1.)	

Source: Serie A, Soccerway
Rules for classification: 1) Points; 2) Head-to-head points; 3) Head-to-head goal difference; 4) Goal difference; 5) Goals scored; 6) Draw.

==== Results summary ====
Overall								Home						Away					
Pld	W	D	L	GF	GA	GD	Pts	W	D	L	GF	GA	GD	W	D	L	GF	GA	GD
38	15	9	14	52	52	0	54	10	3	6	32	23	+9	5	6	8	20	29	−9

Last updated: 15 May 2016.
Source: Competitive matches

==== Results by round ====
Round	1	2	3	4	5	6	7	8	9	10	11	12	13	14	15	16	17	18	19	20	21	22	23	24	25	26	27	28	29	30	31	32	33	34	35	36	37	38
Ground	H	A	H	A	H	A	H	A	H	A	H	A	H	A	H	H	A	H	A	A	H	A	H	A	H	A	H	A	H	A	H	A	H	A	A	H	A	H
Result	W	L	W	L	W	W	W	L	W	L	L	L	D	L	L	D	W	D	W	D	W	D	L	D	W	D	L	D	W	D	L	W	W	L	L	W	W	L
Position	4	13	9	10	8	5	3	6	5	6	7	9	8	10	10	12	10	10	9	9	9	8	9	9	7	8	8	8	8	8	8	8	8	9	9	8	8	8

Updated to match(es) played on 15 May 2016. Source: Competitive matches
A = Away; H = Home; W = Win; D = Draw; L = Loss

==== Matches ====
23 August 2015 1	Lazio	2–1	Bologna	Rome
20:45 CEST (UTC+02:00)	Biglia 17'; Kishna 23'; Milinković-Savić (yellow card) 68'; Radu (yellow card) 90'	Report	Mancosu 43'; Brighi (yellow card) 54'	Stadium: Stadio Olimpico; Attendance: 19,464; Referee: Gianluca Rocchi

30 August 2015 2	Chievo	4–0	Lazio	Verona
20:45 CEST (UTC+02:00)	Meggiorini 12'; Paloschi 30', 68'; Birsa 45'	Report	Cataldi (yellow card) 73'	Stadium: Stadio Marc'Antonio Bentegodi; Attendance: 10,000; Referee: Marco Di Bello

13 September 2015 3	Lazio	2–0	Udinese	Rome
18:00 CEST (UTC+02:00)	Matri 64', 73'	Report	Iturra (yellow card) 90+2'	Stadium: Stadio Olimpico; Attendance: 24,350; Referee: Gianpaolo Calvarese

20 September 2015 4	Napoli	5–0	Lazio	Naples
20:45 CEST (UTC+02:00)	Higuaín 14', 59'; Allan 35'; Insigne 48'; Koulibaly (yellow card) 77'; Gabbiadini 79'	Report	Lulić (yellow card) 19'; Maurício (yellow card) 56'	Stadium: Stadio San Paolo; Attendance: 18,766; Referee: Antonio Damato

23 September 2015 5	Lazio	2–0	Genoa	Rome
20:45 CEST (UTC+02:00)	Cataldi (yellow card) 25'; Đorđević 35'; Maurício (yellow card) 42'; Felipe Anderson 62'; Gentiletti (yellow card) 64'; Milinković-Savić (yellow card) 76'	Report	Marchese (yellow card) 38'; Cissokho (yellow card) 54' (yellow-red card) 56'; Figueiras (yellow card) 78'; Pandev (red card) 85'	Stadium: Stadio Olimpico; Attendance: 17,000; Referee: Nicola Rizzoli

27 September 2015 6	Hellas Verona	1–2	Lazio	Verona
15:00 CEST (UTC+02:00)	Hallfreðsson (yellow card) 14'; Helander 33'; Sala (yellow card) 78'	Report	Maurício (yellow card) 25' (yellow-red card) 81'; Biglia 63' (pen.); Lulić (yellow card) 67'; Parolo 86', (yellow card) 90+2'	Stadium: Stadio Marc'Antonio Bentegodi; Attendance: 16,591; Referee: Piero Giacomelli

4 October 2015 7	Lazio	2–0	Frosinone	Rome
18:00 CEST (UTC+02:00)	Biglia (yellow card) 53'; Gentiletti (yellow card) 59'; Felipe Anderson (yellow card) 68'; Keita 80', (yellow card) 81'; Đorđević 90+4'	Report	Dionisi (yellow card) 53'	Stadium: Stadio Olimpico; Attendance: 27,806; Referee: Marco Di Bello

18 October 2015 8	Sassuolo	2–1	Lazio	Reggio Emilia
15:00 CEST (UTC+02:00)	Berardi 7' (pen.); Sansone (yellow card) 44'; Missiroli 60'	Report	Lulić (yellow card) 7'; Milinković-Savić (yellow card) 20'; Felipe Anderson 67'; Cataldi (yellow card) 75' (yellow-red card) 90+3'; Maurício (yellow card) 85'	Stadium: Mapei Stadium – Città del Tricolore; Attendance: 11,812; Referee: Marco Guida

25 October 2015 9	Lazio	3–0	Torino	Rome
18:00 CET (UTC+01:00)	Maurício (yellow card) 30'; Lulić 40'; Klose (yellow card) 60'; Felipe Anderson 70', 90+4'	Report	Moretti (yellow card) 33'; Vives (yellow card) 39'; Benassi (yellow card) 78'	Stadium: Stadio Olimpico; Attendance: 22,131; Referee: Paolo Mazzoleni

28 October 2015 10	Atalanta	2–1	Lazio	Bergamo
20:45 CET (UTC+01:00)	Masiello (yellow card) 65'; Basta 69' (o.g.); Raimondi (yellow card) 72'; Gómez 86'	Report	Biglia (yellow card) 11', (goal) 17'; Onazi (yellow card) 31'; Lulić (yellow card) 74'; Milinković-Savić (yellow card) 90+2'	Stadium: Stadio Atleti Azzurri d'Italia; Attendance: 14,519; Referee: Massimiliano Irrati

1 November 2015 11	Lazio	1–3	Milan	Rome
20:45 CET (UTC+01:00)	Basta (yellow card) 59'; Kishna 85'; Gentiletti (yellow card) 90+2'	Report	Bertolacci 25'; Mexès 53'; Romagnoli (yellow card) 66'; Bacca 79'; Bonaventura (yellow card) 88'	Stadium: Stadio Olimpico; Attendance: 28,020; Referee: Antonio Damato

8 November 2015 12	Roma	2–0	Lazio	Rome
15:00 CET (UTC+01:00)	Džeko 10' (pen.); Gervinho 63'; Rüdiger (yellow card) 66'; Vainqueur (yellow card) 68'; Digne (yellow card) 70'	Report	Gentiletti (yellow card) 9'; Biglia (yellow card) 28'; Radu (yellow card) 65'; Felipe Anderson (yellow card) 90+5'	Stadium: Stadio Olimpico; Attendance: 35,253; Referee: Paolo Tagliavento

22 November 2015 13	Lazio	1–1	Palermo	Rome
15:00 CET (UTC+01:00)	Gentiletti (yellow card) 60'; Matri (yellow card) 62'; Candreva 70' (pen.); Biglia (yellow card) 90+3'	Report	Goldaniga 21'; Chochev (yellow card) 58'; Hiljemark (yellow card) 69'; Trajkovski (yellow card) 78'	Stadium: Stadio Olimpico; Attendance: 17,175; Referee: Domenico Celi

29 November 2015 14	Empoli	1–0	Lazio	Empoli
18:00 CET (UTC+01:00)	Tonelli 5', (yellow card) 33'; Paredes (yellow card) 16'; Livaja (yellow card) 28'; Pucciarelli (yellow card) 90+5'	Report		Stadium: Stadio Carlo Castellani; Attendance: 9,362; Referee: Michael Fabbri

4 December 2015 15	Lazio	0–2	Juventus	Rome
20:45 CET (UTC+01:00)	Gentiletti (yellow card) 15'; Maurício (yellow card) 37'; Parolo (yellow card) 60'; Klose (yellow card) 84'	Report	Gentiletti 7' (o.g.); Mandžukić (yellow card) 26'; Dybala 32'; Alex Sandro (yellow card) 68'; Evra (yellow card) 75'	Stadium: Stadio Olimpico; Attendance: 27,740; Referee: Luca Banti

14 December 2015 16	Lazio	1–1	Sampdoria	Rome
20:45 CET (UTC+01:00)	Gentiletti (yellow card) 30'; Matri 78'; Berisha (yellow card) 90+2'	Report	Zukanović (yellow card) 24', (goal) 90+3'; Soriano (yellow card) 61'; Cassano (yellow card) 68'; Carbonero (yellow card) 76'	Stadium: Stadio Olimpico; Attendance: 16,544; Referee: Gianpaolo Calvarese

20 December 2015 17	Internazionale	1–2	Lazio	Milan
20:45 CET (UTC+01:00)	Biabiany (yellow card) 55'; Icardi 61'; Melo (red card) 90'	Report	Candreva 5', 87', (yellow card) 90+2'; Biglia (yellow card) 49'; Milinković-Savić (yellow card) 65' (yellow-red card) 90+3'	Stadium: San Siro; Attendance: 46,260; Referee: Paolo Mazzoleni

6 January 2016 18	Lazio	0–0	Carpi	Rome
15:00 CET (UTC+01:00)	Cataldi (yellow card) 53'; Onazi (yellow card) 90+4'	Report	Pasciuti (yellow card) 51'	Stadium: Stadio Olimpico; Attendance: 20,090; Referee: Carmine Russo

9 January 2016 19	Fiorentina	1–3	Lazio	Florence
18:00 CET (UTC+01:00)	Gonzalo (yellow card) 19'; Valero (yellow card) 42'; Roncaglia 90+4'; Pasqual (yellow card) 90+4'	Report	Maurício (yellow card) 23'; Keita 45+1'; Parolo (yellow card) 49'; Hoedt (yellow card) 69'; Konko (yellow card) 74'; Milinković-Savić 90+2'; Felipe Anderson 90+6'	Stadium: Stadio Artemio Franchi; Attendance: 25,361; Referee: Nicola Rizzoli

17 January 2016 20	Bologna	2–2	Lazio	Bologna
15:00 CET (UTC+01:00)	Giaccherini 2'; Destro 18', (yellow card) 55'; Masina (red card) 69'	Report	Maurício (yellow card) 42'; Candreva 71' (pen.); Biglia (yellow card) 73'; Lulić 77'	Stadium: Stadio Renato Dall'Ara; Attendance: 16,449; Referee: Marco Di Bello

24 January 2016 21	Lazio	4–1	Chievo	Rome
15:00 CET (UTC+01:00)	Lulić (yellow card) 37'; Candreva 66' (pen.), 81'; Cataldi 72', (yellow card) 73'; Radu (red card) 82'; Keita 90+6'	Report	Cesar 5', (yellow card) 22' (yellow-red card) 47'	Stadium: Stadio Olimpico; Attendance: 17,118; Referee: Gianpaolo Calvarese

31 January 2016 22	Udinese	0–0	Lazio	Udine
15:00 CET (UTC+01:00)	Théréau (yellow card) 29'; Danilo (yellow card) 31' (yellow-red card) 42'; Wagué (yellow card) 36'	Report	Đorđević (yellow card) 31'; Parolo (yellow card) 50'; Cataldi (yellow card) 66'; Matri (red card) 85'; Milinković-Savić (yellow card) 90+4'	Stadium: Stadio Friuli; Attendance: 13,611; Referee: Domenico Celi

3 February 2016 23	Lazio	0–2	Napoli	Rome
15:00 CET (UTC+01:00)	Lulić (yellow card) 38'; Hoedt (yellow card) 57'; Maurício (yellow card) 73'; Keita (yellow card) 90+4'	Report	Higuaín 24'; Callejón 27'; Koulibaly (yellow card) 87'; Jorginho (yellow card) 90+2'	Stadium: Stadio Olimpico; Attendance: 20,189; Referee: Massimiliano Irrati

6 February 2016 24	Genoa	0–0	Lazio	Genoa
19:45 CET (UTC+01:00)	Suso (yellow card) 52'; Muñoz (yellow card) 61'; Rincón (yellow card) 85'	Report	Parolo (yellow card) 19'; Cataldi (yellow card) 72'; Lulić (yellow card) 86'	Stadium: Stadio Luigi Ferraris; Attendance: 19,670; Referee: Daniele Orsato

11 February 2016 25	Lazio	5–2	Hellas Verona	Rome
19:45 CET (UTC+01:00)	Matri 45'; Mauri 50'; Felipe Anderson 69'; Maurício (yellow card) 71'; Keita 82'; Candreva 90' (pen.)	Report	Greco 72'; Toni 79'	Stadium: Stadio Olimpico; Attendance: 10,000; Referee: Andrea Gervasoni

21 February 2016 26	Frosinone	0–0	Lazio	Frosinone
17:00 CET (UTC+01:00)	Rosi (yellow card) 75'; Chibsah (yellow card) 90+4'	Report		Stadium: Stadio Matusa; Attendance: 7,954; Referee: Carmine Russo

29 February 2016 27	Lazio	0–2	Sassuolo	Rome
18:00 CET (UTC+01:00)	Maurício (yellow card) 40'	Report	Magnanelli (yellow card) 20'; Berardi 41' (pen.); Consigli (yellow card) 58'; Defrel 67'	Stadium: Stadio Olimpico; Attendance: 13,995; Referee: Antonio Damato

6 March 2016 28	Torino	1–1	Lazio	Turin
15:00 CET (UTC+01:00)	Belotti 12'; Vives (yellow card) 23'; Peres (yellow card) 49'; Acquah (yellow card) 57'	Report	Konko (yellow card) 51'; Parolo (yellow card) 70'; Biglia 78' (pen.)	Stadium: Stadio Olimpico di Torino; Attendance: 18,863; Referee: Davide Massa

13 March 2016 29	Lazio	2–0	Atalanta	Rome
15:00 CET (UTC+01:00)	Cataldi (yellow card) 66'; Klose 67', 90+5'; Patric (yellow card) 80'	Report	Cigarini (yellow card) 24'; Sportiello (yellow card) 68'; Toloi (yellow card) 88'; Masiello (yellow card) 90+1'	Stadium: Stadio Olimpico; Attendance: 16,553; Referee: Marco Guida

20 March 2016 30	Milan	1–1	Lazio	Milan
15:00 CET (UTC+01:00)	Bacca 15'; Abate (yellow card) 76'	Report	Parolo 9'; Lulić (yellow card) 61' (yellow-red card) 84'; Biglia (yellow card) 72'	Stadium: San Siro; Attendance: 33,481; Referee: Paolo Tagliavento

3 April 2016 31	Lazio	1–4	Roma	Rome
15:00 CEST (UTC+02:00)	Patric (yellow card) 24'; Candreva (yellow card) 27'; Biglia (yellow card) 37'; Hoedt (yellow card) 65' (yellow-red card) 90+5'; Cataldi (yellow card) 69'; Parolo 75'	Report	El Shaarawy 15'; Nainggolan (yellow card) 41'; Rüdiger (yellow card) 56'; Džeko 64'; Florenzi 83'; Perotti 87'	Stadium: Stadio Olimpico; Attendance: 29,205; Referee: Luca Banti

10 April 2016 32	Palermo	0–3	Lazio	Palermo
15:00 CEST (UTC+02:00)	Quaison (yellow card) 33'; Jajalo (yellow card) 71'	Report	Klose 10', 15'; Parolo (yellow card) 19'; Gentiletti (yellow card) 50'; Felipe Anderson 72'; Maurício (yellow card) 88'	Stadium: Stadio Renzo Barbera; Attendance: 22,531; Referee: Andrea Gervasoni

17 April 2016 33	Lazio	2–0	Empoli	Rome
15:00 CEST (UTC+02:00)	Candreva 6' (pen.); Keita (yellow card) 27'; Biglia (yellow card) 28'; Parolo (yellow card) 30'; Onazi 44'	Report	Ćosić (yellow card) 6'; Mchedlidze (yellow card) 90'	Stadium: Stadio Olimpico; Attendance: 20,983; Referee: Angelo Cervellera

20 April 2016 34	Juventus	3–0	Lazio	Turin
20:45 CEST (UTC+02:00)	Mandžukić 39'; Dybala 52' (pen.), 64'; Sturaro (yellow card) 75'	Report	Patric (yellow card) 42' (yellow-red card) 48'; Lulić (yellow card) 75'	Stadium: Juventus Stadium; Attendance: 38,655; Referee: Paolo Mazzoleni

24 April 2016 35	Sampdoria	2–1	Lazio	Genoa
15:00 CEST (UTC+02:00)	Fernando 20'; Dodô (yellow card) 44'; Diakité 78'; Škriniar (yellow card) 90+4'	Report	Đorđević 3'; Hoedt (yellow card) 22'; Candreva (yellow card) 32'; Keita (yellow card) 38'; Konko (yellow card) 55'; Gentiletti (yellow card) 81'; Maurício (yellow card) 84'	Stadium: Stadio Luigi Ferraris; Attendance: 20,560; Referee: Nicola Rizzoli

1 May 2016 36	Lazio	2–0	Internazionale	Rome
15:00 CEST (UTC+02:00)	Klose 8', (yellow card) 64'; Gentiletti (yellow card) 13'; Keita (yellow card) 52'; Lulić (yellow card) 68'; Candreva 84' (pen.), (yellow card) 85'	Report	Murillo (yellow card) 81' (yellow-red card) 83'	Stadium: Stadio Olimpico; Attendance: 20,000; Referee: Luca Banti

8 May 2016 37	Carpi	1–3	Lazio	Modena
15:00 CEST (UTC+02:00)	Poli (yellow card) 24'; Pasciuti (yellow card) 26'; Romagnoli (yellow card) 43'; Lollo (yellow card) 55'; Mbakogu 84'; Letizia (yellow card) 90+1'	Report	Biševac 23'; Candreva 32'; Maurício (yellow card) 41'; Parolo (yellow card) 42'; Biglia (yellow card) 42' (yellow-red card) 83'; Klose 73'; Đorđević (red card) 90'	Stadium: Stadio Alberto Braglia; Attendance: 9,881; Referee: Gianluca Rocchi

15 May 2016 38	Lazio	2–4	Fiorentina	Rome
15:00 CEST (UTC+02:00)	Lulić 2'; Klose 74' (pen.)	Report	Vecino 31', 70'; Bernardeschi 40'; Tello 45'; Costa (yellow card) 89'	Stadium: Stadio Olimpico; Attendance: 31,108; Referee: Gianluca Manganiello

=== Coppa Italia ===
17 December 2015 Round of 16	Lazio	2–1	Udinese	Rome
16:00 CET (UTC+01:00)	Matri 70'; Cataldi 79', (yellow card) 80'	Report	Ali Adnan (yellow card) 59'; Kone 67'	Stadium: Stadio Olimpico; Attendance: 1,970; Referee: Antonio Damato

20 January 2016 Quarter-finals	Lazio	0–1	Juventus	Rome
20:45 CET (UTC+01:00)	Lulić (yellow card) 31'; Maurício (yellow card) 55'; Konko (yellow card) 60'	Report	Chiellini (yellow card) 44'; Lichtsteiner 66'; Zaza (yellow card) 90'; Dybala (yellow card) 90+3'	Stadium: Stadio Olimpico; Attendance: 30,799; Referee: Antonio Damato

=== UEFA Champions League ===
==== Play-off round ====
18 August 2015 First leg	Lazio (Italy)	1–0	(Germany) Bayer Leverkusen	Rome, Italy
20:45 CEST (UTC+02:00)	Maurício (yellow card) 49'; Keita 77'; Milinković-Savić (yellow card) 82'	Report	Kießling (yellow card) 20'; Leno (yellow card) 31'; Wendell (yellow card) 36'; Papadopoulos (yellow card) 82'	Stadium: Stadio Olimpico; Attendance: 38,917; Referee: Jonas Eriksson (Sweden)

26 August 2015 Second leg	Bayer Leverkusen (Germany)	3–0 (3–1 agg.)	(Italy) Lazio	Leverkusen, Germany
20:45 CEST (UTC+02:00)	Bellarabi (yellow card) 37', (goal) 88'; Çalhanoğlu 40'; Mehmedi 48'; Wendell (yellow card) 67'; Hilbert (yellow card) 86'	Report	Maurício (yellow card) 60' (yellow-red card) 68'; Parolo (yellow card) 71'; Lulić (yellow card) 74'	Stadium: BayArena; Attendance: 28,222; Referee: Carlos Velasco Carballo (Spain)

=== UEFA Europa League ===
==== Group stage ====
Pos	Team	Pld	W	D	L	GF	GA	GD	Pts	Qualification	LAZ	SET	DNI	ROS
1	(Italy) Lazio	6	4	2	0	13	6	+7	14	Advance to knockout phase	—	3–2	3–1	3–1
2	(France) Saint-Étienne	6	2	3	1	10	7	+3	9	Advance to knockout phase	1–1	—	3–0	2–2
3	(Ukraine) Dnipro Dnipropetrovsk	6	2	1	3	6	8	−2	7		1–1	0–1	—	3–0
4	(Norway) Rosenborg	6	0	2	4	4	12	−8	2		0–2	1–1	0–1	—

Source: Soccerway
Rules for classification: Group stage tiebreakers

17 September 2015 1	Dnipro Dnipropetrovsk (Ukraine)	1–1	(Italy) Lazio	Dnipropetrovsk, Ukraine
21:05 CEST (UTC+02:00)	Matheus (yellow card) 50'; Ruiz (yellow card) 65'; Edmar (yellow card) 81'; Seleznyov 90+4'	Report	Milinković-Savić 34', (yellow card) 45'; Hoedt (yellow card) 44'; Radu (yellow card) 66'	Stadium: Dnipro-Arena; Attendance: 150; Referee: Arnold Hunter (Northern Ireland)

1 October 2015 2	Lazio (Italy)	3–2	(France) Saint-Étienne	Rome, Italy
19:00 CEST (UTC+02:00)	Onazi 22', (yellow card) 25'; Hoedt 48'; Biglia 80'	Report	Sall 6', (yellow card) 48' (yellow-red card) 77'; Berić (red card) 33'; Monnet-Paquet 84'	Stadium: Stadio Olimpico; Attendance: 11,039; Referee: Halis Özkahya (Turkey)

22 October 2015 3	Lazio (Italy)	3–1	(Norway) Rosenborg	Rome, Italy
19:00 CEST (UTC+02:00)	Maurício (red card) 6'; Matri 28', (yellow card) 90'; Felipe Anderson 54'; Candreva 79'; Milinković-Savić (yellow card) 84'; Konko (yellow card) 90+3'	Report	Bjørdal (yellow card) 62'; Søderlund 69'	Stadium: Stadio Olimpico; Attendance: 8,630; Referee: Paweł Gil (Poland)

5 November 2015 4	Rosenborg (Norway)	0–2	(Italy) Lazio	Trondheim, Norway
21:05 CET (UTC+01:00)		Report	Đorđević 9', 29'; Radu (yellow card) 21'; Kishna (yellow card) 82'; Keita (red card) 83'	Stadium: Lerkendal Stadion; Attendance: 16,038; Referee: Andre Marriner (England)

26 November 2015 5	Lazio (Italy)	3–1	(Ukraine) Dnipro Dnipropetrovsk	Rome, Italy
19:00 CET (UTC+01:00)	Candreva 4'; Radu (yellow card) 53'; Parolo 68', (yellow card) 78'; Milinković-Savić (yellow card) 85'; Đorđević 90+3'	Report	Gama 65'; Danilo (yellow card) 79'; Léo Matos (yellow card) 82'	Stadium: Stadio Olimpico; Attendance: 3,058; Referee: Gediminas Mažeika (Lithuania)

10 December 2015 6	Saint-Étienne (France)	1–1	(Italy) Lazio	Saint-Étienne, France
21:05 CET (UTC+01:00)	Brison (yellow card) 41'; Eysseric 76'	Report	Hoedt (yellow card) 5'; Maurício (yellow card) 33'; Matri 52'; Cataldi (yellow card) 72'	Stadium: Stade Geoffroy-Guichard; Attendance: 28,954; Referee: Kevin Blom (Netherlands)

==== Knockout phase ====
===== Round of 32 =====
18 February 2016 First leg	Galatasaray (Turkey)	1–1	(Italy) Lazio	Istanbul, Turkey
21:05 CET (UTC+01:00)	Sarıoğlu 12'; Donk (yellow card) 20'	Report	Milinković-Savić 21'; Parolo (yellow card) 60'; Biglia (yellow card) 77'	Stadium: Türk Telekom Arena; Attendance: 33,353; Referee: Michael Oliver (England)

25 February 2016 Second leg	Lazio (Italy)	3–1 (4–2 agg.)	(Turkey) Galatasaray	Rome, Italy
19:00 CET (UTC+01:00)	Parolo 59'; Felipe Anderson 61'; Klose 72'	Report	Öztekin 62'	Stadium: Stadio Olimpico; Attendance: 14,019; Referee: Vladislav Bezborodov (Russia)

===== Round of 16 =====
10 March 2016 First leg	Sparta Prague (Czech Republic)	1–1	(Italy) Lazio	Prague, Czech Republic
21:05 CET (UTC+01:00)	Frýdek 13'; Zahustel (yellow card) 52'	Report	Parolo 38'; Matri (yellow card) 38'	Stadium: Generali Arena; Attendance: 17,482; Referee: Alberto Undiano Mallenco (Spain)

17 March 2016 Second leg	Lazio (Italy)	0–3 (1–4 agg.)	(Czech Republic) Sparta Prague	Rome, Italy
19:00 CET (UTC+01:00)	Lulić (yellow card) 71'	Report	Dočkal 10'; Krejčí 12'; Juliš 44'; Frýdek (yellow card) 78'	Stadium: Stadio Olimpico; Attendance: 18,827; Referee: Ruddy Buquet (France)

== Statistics ==
=== Appearances and goals ===
No.	Pos	Nat	Player	Total		Serie A		Supercoppa Italiana		Coppa Italia		Europe	
No.	Pos	Nat	Player	Apps	Goals	Apps	Goals	Apps	Goals	Apps	Goals	Apps	Goals
Goalkeepers
22	GK	(Italy) ITA	Federico Marchetti	35	0	29	0	1	0	0	0	5	0
99	GK	(Albania) ALB	Etrit Berisha	20	0	9+2	0	0	0	2	0	7	0
Defenders
2	DF	(Netherlands) NED	Wesley Hoedt	35	1	24+1	0	0	0	1+1	0	8	1
3	DF	(Netherlands) NED	Stefan de Vrij	5	0	2	0	1	0	0	0	2	0
4	DF	(Spain) ESP	Patric	9	0	6+3	0	0	0	0	0	0	0
5	DF	(Netherlands) NED	Edson Braafheid	5	0	3+2	0	0	0	0	0	0	0
8	DF	(Serbia) SRB	Dušan Basta	29	0	21+2	0	1	0	0	0	4+1	0
13	DF	(Serbia) SRB	Milan Biševac	15	1	11	1	0	0	1	0	3	0
18	DF	(Argentina) ARG	Santiago Gentiletti	27	0	19	0	1	0	0	0	3+4	0
26	DF	(Romania) ROU	Ștefan Radu	25	0	13	0	1	0	2	0	9	0
29	DF	(France) FRA	Abdoulay Konko	29	0	17+1	0	0	0	2	0	9	0
33	DF	(Brazil) BRA	Maurício	36	0	19+5	0	0	0	2	0	8+2	0
Midfielders
6	MF	(Italy) ITA	Stefano Mauri	19	1	6+6	1	0	0	0+1	0	3+3	0
7	MF	(England) ENG	Ravel Morrison	7	0	0+4	0	0+1	0	0	0	1+1	0
10	MF	(Brazil) BRA	Felipe Anderson	47	9	21+14	7	1	0	1+1	0	8+1	2
16	MF	(Italy) ITA	Marco Parolo	40	6	30+1	3	0	0	0	0	9	3
19	MF	(Bosnia and Herzegovina) BIH	Senad Lulić	39	2	28+2	2	0	0	1	0	5+3	0
20	MF	(Argentina) ARG	Lucas Biglia	36	5	26+1	4	1	0	2	0	6	1
21	MF	(Serbia) SRB	Sergej Milinković-Savić	35	3	17+8	1	0	0	2	0	5+3	2
23	MF	(Nigeria) NGR	Ogenyi Onazi	22	2	14+1	1	1	0	0	0	6	1
32	MF	(Italy) ITA	Danilo Cataldi	27	2	16+4	1	1	0	1	1	4+1	0
87	MF	(Italy) ITA	Antonio Candreva	44	12	28+2	10	1	0	2	0	7+4	2
Forwards
9	FW	(Serbia) SRB	Filip Đorđević	32	6	16+11	3	0+1	0	0+1	0	2+1	3
11	FW	(Germany) GER	Miroslav Klose	31	7	14+10	6	1	0	1	0	3+2	1
14	FW	(Senegal) SEN	Keita Baldé	39	5	15+16	4	0	0	1	0	4+3	1
17	FW	(Italy) ITA	Alessandro Matri	31	7	7+12	4	0	0	1+1	1	7+3	2
88	FW	(Netherlands) NED	Ricardo Kishna	16	2	7+4	2	0+1	0	0	0	3+1	0
Players transferred out during the season

Last updated: 15 May 2016
Source: Competitions

=== Goalscorers ===
Rank	No.	Pos	Nat	Name	Serie A	Supercoppa	Coppa Italia	UEFA CL	UEFA EL	Total
1	87	MF	(Italy)	Antonio Candreva	10	0	0	0	2	12
2	10	MF	(Brazil)	Felipe Anderson	7	0	0	0	2	9
3	11	FW	(Germany)	Miroslav Klose	7	0	0	0	1	8
4	17	FW	(Italy)	Alessandro Matri	4	0	1	0	2	7
5	9	FW	(Serbia)	Filip Đorđević	3	0	0	0	3	6
5	16	MF	(Italy)	Marco Parolo	3	0	0	0	3	6
7
7	14	FW	(Senegal)	Keita Baldé	4	0	0	1	0	5
7	20	MF	(Argentina)	Lucas Biglia	4	0	0	0	1	5
9	19	MF	(Bosnia and Herzegovina)	Senad Lulić	3	0	0	0	0	3
9	21	MF	(Serbia)	Sergej Milinković-Savić	1	0	0	0	2	3
11
11	23	MF	(Nigeria)	Ogenyi Onazi	1	0	0	0	1	2
11	32	MF	(Italy)	Danilo Cataldi	1	0	1	0	0	2
11	88	FW	(Netherlands)	Ricardo Kishna	2	0	0	0	0	2
14	2	DF	(Netherlands)	Wesley Hoedt	0	0	0	0	1	1
14	6	MF	(Italy)	Stefano Mauri	1	0	0	0	0	1
14	13	DF	(Serbia)	Milan Biševac	1	0	0	0	0	1
Own goal					0	0	0	0	0	0
Totals					52	0	2	1	18	73

Last updated: 15 May 2016

=== Clean sheets ===
Rank	No.	Pos	Nat	Name	Serie A	Supercoppa	Coppa Italia	UEFA CL	UEFA EL	Total
1	22	GK	(Italy)	Federico Marchetti	10	0	0	0	0	10
1	99	GK	(Albania)	Etrit Berisha	3	0	0	1	1	5
Totals					13	0	0	1	1	15

Last updated: 1 May 2016
