= 2014–15 SS Lazio season =

Lazio
2014–15 season
- President: Claudio Lotito
- Manager: Stefano Pioli
- Stadium: Stadio Olimpico
- Serie A: 3rd
- Coppa Italia: Runners-up
- Top goalscorer: League: Miroslav Klose (13); All: Miroslav Klose (16)
- Highest home attendance: 60,000 vs Juventus (20 May 2015, Coppa Italia)
- Lowest home attendance: 3,903 vs Varese (2 December 2014, Coppa Italia)
- Average home league attendance: 34,949
- Biggest win: 4–0 vs Empoli
- Biggest defeat: 0–3 vs Juventus
Home colours	Away colours	Third colours

The 2014–15 season was Società Sportiva Lazio's 115th season since their founding and the club's 27th consecutive season in the top-flight of Italian football. They finished third, behind eventual winner Juventus and Roma.

== Players ==
As of 10 May 2015.

Note: Flags indicate national team as defined under FIFA eligibility rules; some limited exceptions apply. Players may hold more than one non-FIFA nationality.

No.	Pos.	Nation	Player
1	GK	ALB	Etrit Berisha
2	DF	FRA	Michaël Ciani
3	DF	NED	Stefan de Vrij
5	DF	NED	Edson Braafheid
6	MF	ITA	Stefano Mauri (captain)
7	MF	BRA	Felipe Anderson
8	DF	SRB	Dušan Basta (on loan from Udinese)
9	FW	SRB	Filip Đorđević
10	MF	BRA	Ederson
11	FW	GER	Miroslav Klose
13	DF	FRA	Abdoulay Konko
14	FW	ESP	Keita Baldé
16	MF	ITA	Marco Parolo
17	MF	POR	Bruno Pereirinha
18	DF	ARG	Santiago Gentiletti
19	MF	BIH	Senad Lulić
20	MF	ARG	Lucas Biglia

No.	Pos.	Nation	Player
22	GK	ITA	Federico Marchetti
23	MF	NGA	Ogenyi Onazi
24	MF	ITA	Cristian Ledesma (vice-captain)
26	DF	ROU	Ștefan Radu (vice-captain)
27	DF	ALB	Lorik Cana
32	MF	ITA	Danilo Cataldi
33	DF	BRA	Maurício (on loan from Sporting CP)
34	FW	COL	Brayan Perea
39	DF	BEL	Luis Pedro Cavanda
55	GK	ITA	Guido Guerrieri
77	GK	ALB	Thomas Strakosha
78	FW	ESP	Mamadou Tounkara
85	DF	ARG	Diego Novaretti
87	MF	ITA	Antonio Candreva

== Transfers ==
=== In ===
Date	Pos.	Player	Age	Moving from	Fee	Source
30 June 2014	MF	(Italy) Danilo Cataldi	19	(Italy) Crotone	Return from loan	
1 July 2014	GK	(Italy) Guido Guerrieri	18	(Italy) Lazio Primavera	Free	
1 July 2014	FW	(Serbia) Filip Đorđević	26	(France) Nantes	Free	
1 July 2014	MF	(Italy) Marco Parolo	29	(Italy) Parma	€5,500,000	
1 July 2014	MF	(Serbia) Dušan Basta	29	(Italy) Udinese	Loan	
1 July 2014	FW	(Spain) Mamadou Tounkara	18	(Italy) Lazio Primavera	Free	
30 July 2014	DF	(Netherlands) Stefan de Vrij	22	(Netherlands) Feyenoord	€6,500,000	
1 August 2014	DF	(Netherlands) Edson Braafheid	31	(Germany) 1899 Hoffenheim	Free	
21 August 2014	DF	(Argentina) Santiago Gentiletti	29	(Argentina) San Lorenzo	€750,000	
21 January 2015	DF	(Brazil) Maurício	26	(Portugal) Sporting CP	Loan	
27 January 2015	DF	(Colombia) Brayan Perea	21	(Italy) Perugia	Return from loan	

=== Out ===
Date	Pos.	Player	Age	Moving to	Fee	Source
12 July 2014	MF	(Italy) Enrico Zampa	22	(Italy) Trapani	Loan	
12 July 2014	FW	(Italy) Cristiano Lombardi	19	(Italy) Trapani	Loan	
1 February 2015	MF	(Uruguay) Álvaro González	30	(Italy) Torino	Loan	

== Competitions ==
=== Serie A ===
==== League table ====
Pos	Team	Pld	W	D	L	GF	GA	GD	Pts	Qualification or relegation
1	Juventus (C)	38	26	9	3	72	24	+48	87	Qualification for the Champions League group stage
2	Roma	38	19	13	6	54	31	+23	70	Qualification for the Champions League group stage
3	Lazio	38	21	6	11	71	38	+33	69	Qualification for the Champions League play-off round
4	Fiorentina	38	18	10	10	61	46	+15	64	Qualification for the Europa League group stage (Note: Since the winners of the 2014–15 Coppa Italia (Juventus) qualified for European competition based on league position, the spot awarded to the cup winners (Europa League group stage) was passed to the fifth-placed team and the spot originally meant for the fifth-placed team (Europa League third qualifying round) was given to the highest placed team that has obtained an UEFA licence and not already qualified for European competition.)
5	Napoli	38	18	9	11	70	54	+16	63	Qualification for the Europa League group stage

Source: 2014–15 Serie A, 2014-15 Serie A classification.
Rules for classification: 1) points; 2) head-to-head points; 3) head-to-head goal difference; 4) goal difference; 5) number of goals scored; 6) draw. (Head-to-head record is applied for clubs with the same number of points only once all matches between said clubs have been played.).
(C) Champions

==== Results summary ====
Overall								Home						Away					
Pld	W	D	L	GF	GA	GD	Pts	W	D	L	GF	GA	GD	W	D	L	GF	GA	GD
38	21	6	11	71	38	+33	69	12	1	6	40	18	+22	9	5	5	31	20	+11

Last updated: 31 May 2015.
Source: Competitive matches

==== Results by round ====
Round	1	2	3	4	5	6	7	8	9	10	11	12	13	14	15	16	17	18	19	20	21	22	23	24	25	26	27	28	29	30	31	32	33	34	35	36	37	38
Ground	A	H	A	H	A	H	A	H	A	H	A	H	A	A	H	A	H	A	H	H	A	H	A	H	A	H	A	H	A	H	A	H	H	A	H	A	H	A
Result	L	W	L	L	W	W	W	W	D	W	L	L	D	W	W	D	W	D	L	W	L	L	W	W	W	W	W	W	W	W	L	D	W	D	L	W	L	W
Position	18	8	12	15	9	8	6	5	3	3	5	6	7	3	3	3	3	3	5	4	4	6	5	4	4	3	3	3	3	2	2	2	2	3	3	3	3	3

Updated to match(es) played on 31 May 2015. Source: Competitive matches
A = Away; H = Home; W = Win; D = Draw; L = Loss

==== Matches ====
31 August 2014 1	Milan	3–1	Lazio	Milan
18:00 CEST (UTC+02:00)	Honda 7'; De Jong (yellow card) 20'; Muntari 56'; Ménez 64' (pen.); López (yellow card) 71'	Report	Radu (yellow card) 25'; Lulić (yellow card) 37'; De Vrij (yellow card) 62'; Alex 67' (o.g.)	Stadium: San Siro; Attendance: 36,674; Referee: Paolo Tagliavento

14 September 2014 2	Lazio	3–0	Cesena	Rome
15:00 CEST (UTC+02:00)	Candreva 19'; Parolo (yellow card) 28', (goal) 56'; Biglia (yellow card) 44'; Braafheid (yellow card) 68'; Mauri 90'	Report	Lucchini (yellow card) 25'	Stadium: Stadio Olimpico; Attendance: 31,200; Referee: Massimiliano Irrati

21 September 2014 3	Genoa	1–0	Lazio	Genoa
15:00 CEST (UTC+02:00)	Rincón (yellow card) 47'; Pinilla 87'; De Maio (yellow card) 90+3'	Report	Ledesma (yellow card) 57'; De Vrij (yellow card) 70' (yellow-red card) 85'	Stadium: Stadio Luigi Ferraris; Attendance: 18,279; Referee: Marco Guida

25 September 2014 4	Lazio	0–1	Udinese	Rome
20:45 CEST (UTC+02:00)	Novaretti (yellow card) 15'; Candreva (yellow card) 45+4'; Lulić (yellow card) 88'	Report	Théréau 26'; Kone (yellow card) 45+1'	Stadium: Stadio Olimpico; Attendance: 26,919; Referee: Gianluca Rocchi

29 September 2014 5	Palermo	0–4	Lazio	Palermo
21:00 CEST (UTC+02:00)	Morganella (yellow card) 42'; Vázquez (yellow card) 90+2'	Report	Parolo (yellow card) 20', (goal) 90+2'; Đorđević 45', 75', 83'; Mauri (yellow card) 64'; Cana (yellow card) 65'; Marchetti (yellow card) 79'	Stadium: Stadio Renzo Barbera; Attendance: 17,087; Referee: Marco Di Bello

5 October 2014 6	Lazio	3–2	Sassuolo	Rome
15:00 CEST (UTC+02:00)	Mauri 9'; Đorđević 25'; Onazi (yellow card) 27'; Candreva 35'; Cana (yellow card) 42' (yellow-red card) 49'; Marchetti (yellow card) 82'	Report	Berardi 26', 50' (pen.); Peluso (yellow card) 28' (yellow-red card) 61'; Cannavaro (yellow card) 67'	Stadium: Stadio Olimpico; Attendance: 29,381; Referee: Dino Tommasi

19 October 2014 7	Fiorentina	0–2	Lazio	Florence
12:30 CEST (UTC+02:00)	Pizarro (yellow card) 25'; Neto (yellow card) 90+2'	Report	Đorđević (yellow card) 31', (goal) 35'; Parolo (yellow card) 37'; Cavanda (yellow card) 45+1'; Marchetti (yellow card) 53'; Radu (yellow card) 71'; Lulić 90+2'	Stadium: Stadio Artemio Franchi; Attendance: 30,967; Referee: Sebastiano Peruzzo

26 October 2014 8	Lazio	2–1	Torino	Rome
18:00 CET (UTC+01:00)	Biglia 15'; Cavanda (yellow card) 24'; Klose 60', (yellow card) 66'	Report	Benassi (yellow card) 27'; Farnerud 53'	Stadium: Stadio Olimpico; Attendance: 34,782; Referee: Piero Giacomelli

30 October 2014 9	Hellas Verona	1–1	Lazio	Verona
20:45 CET (UTC+01:00)	Martić (yellow card) 26'; Toni 69' (pen.); Campanharo (yellow card) 88'	Report	Onazi (yellow card) 22'; Lulić 42'; Cavanda (yellow card) 49' (yellow-red card) 68'; Biglia (yellow card) 77'	Stadium: Stadio Marc'Antonio Bentegodi; Attendance: 17,760; Referee: Massimiliano Irrati

3 November 2014 10	Lazio	4–2	Cagliari	Rome
21:00 CET (UTC+01:00)	Mauri 7'; Klose 25', 26'; De Vrij (yellow card) 43'; Lulić (yellow card) 72'; Ederson 90+2'	Report	Braafheid 48' (o.g.); Ceppitelli (yellow card) 56'; Crisetig (yellow card) 63'; Conti (yellow card) 68'; Ibarbo (red card) 72'; João Pedro 84'	Stadium: Stadio Olimpico; Attendance: 32,569; Referee: Marco Di Bello

9 November 2014 11	Empoli	2–1	Lazio	Empoli
15:00 CET (UTC+01:00)	Barba 52'; Maccarone 55'; Mário Rui (yellow card) 84'	Report	Cavanda (yellow card) 38'; Ederson (yellow card) 57'; Đorđević 66'	Stadium: Stadio Carlo Castellani; Attendance: 8,153; Referee: Paolo Mazzoleni

22 November 2014 12	Lazio	0–3	Juventus	Rome
20:45 CET (UTC+01:00)	Basta (yellow card) 49'; Lulić (yellow card) 74'	Report	Pogba 24', 64'; Padoin (yellow card) 36' (yellow-red card) 70'; Lichtsteiner (yellow card) 52'; Tevez 55'; Bonucci (yellow card) 67'	Stadium: Stadio Olimpico; Attendance: 42,044; Referee: Antonio Damato

29 November 2014 13	Chievo	0–0	Lazio	Verona
20:45 CET (UTC+01:00)	Cesar (yellow card) 56'	Report		Stadium: Stadio Marc'Antonio Bentegodi; Attendance: 7,500; Referee: Luca Banti

7 December 2014 14	Parma	1–2	Lazio	Parma
15:00 CET (UTC+01:00)	Lodi (yellow card) 3'; Santacroce (yellow card) 33'; Palladino 45'; Gobbi (yellow card) 48'; Acquah (yellow card) 88'	Report	Biglia (yellow card) 10'; Mauri 45+3'; Felipe Anderson (yellow card) 58', (goal) 59'; Parolo (yellow card) 68'; Radu (yellow card) 89'	Stadium: Stadio Ennio Tardini; Attendance: 10,778; Referee: Marco Guida

13 December 2014 15	Lazio	3–0	Atalanta	Rome
20:45 CET (UTC+01:00)	Mauri 51', 71'; Lulić 81'	Report	Denis (yellow card) 37'; Migliaccio (yellow card) 48'	Stadium: Stadio Olimpico; Attendance: 24,477; Referee: Gianluca Rocchi

21 December 2014 16	Internazionale	2–2	Lazio	Milan
20:45 CET (UTC+01:00)	D'Ambrosio (yellow card) 50'; Kovačić 66'; Palacio 80'	Report	Felipe Anderson 2', 37', (yellow card) 18'; Lulić (yellow card) 30'; Klose (yellow card) 32'; González (yellow card) 87'	Stadium: San Siro; Attendance: 36,344; Referee: Paolo Tagliavento

5 January 2015 17	Lazio	3–0	Sampdoria	Rome
20:45 CET (UTC+01:00)	Parolo 38'; Felipe Anderson 41'; Cana (yellow card) 45+1'; Basta (yellow card) 56'; Đorđević 66'	Report	Gastaldello (yellow card) 19'; Soriano (yellow card) 64'	Stadium: Stadio Olimpico; Attendance: 31,322; Referee: Gianpaolo Calvarese

11 January 2015 18	Roma	2–2	Lazio	Rome
15:00 CET (UTC+01:00)	Iturbe (yellow card) 32'; Nainggolan (yellow card) 39'; Totti 48', 64'; Pjanić (yellow card) 58'; De Rossi (yellow card) 72'	Report	Felipe Anderson (yellow card) 16', (goal) 29'; Mauri 25', (yellow card) 32'; Cana (yellow card) 31'; Marchetti (yellow card) 51'	Stadium: Stadio Olimpico; Attendance: 51,252; Referee: Daniele Orsato

18 January 2015 19	Lazio	0–1	Napoli	Rome
12:30 CET (UTC+01:00)	Ledesma (yellow card) 16'; Parolo (yellow card) 43'; Keita (yellow card) 70'	Report	Higuaín 18'; López (yellow card) 32'; Mertens (yellow card) 58'; Gargano (yellow card) 78'	Stadium: Stadio Olimpico; Attendance: 26,857; Referee: Nicola Rizzoli

24 January 2015 20	Lazio	3–1	Milan	Rome
20:45 CET (UTC+01:00)	Radu (yellow card) 3'; Biglia (yellow card) 36'; Cataldi (yellow card) 40'; Parolo 47', 81'; Klose 51'; Mauri (yellow card) 90+3'	Report	Alex (yellow card) 3'; Ménez 4'; Poli (yellow card) 10'; Armero (yellow card) 42'; Mexès (red card) 90+2'	Stadium: Stadio Olimpico; Attendance: 32,228; Referee: Paolo Mazzoleni

1 February 2015 21	Cesena	2–1	Lazio	Cesena
15:00 CET (UTC+01:00)	Defrel 60'; Cataldi 77' (o.g.); Capelli (yellow card) 87'	Report	Parolo (yellow card) 48'; Maurício (yellow card) 57'; Marchetti (yellow card) 78'; Klose 87'	Stadium: Stadio Dino Manuzzi; Attendance: 14,818; Referee: Sebastiano Peruzzo

9 February 2015 22	Lazio	0–1	Genoa	Rome
20:45 CET (UTC+01:00)	Mauri (yellow card) 14'; Cana (yellow card) 16'; Marchetti (red card) 27'; Candreva (yellow card) 44'; De Vrij (yellow card) 45+3'	Report	Bertolacci (yellow card) 18'; Perotti 30' (pen.); Roncaglia (yellow card) 50'; De Maio (yellow card) 70'; Lestienne (yellow card) 88'; Pavoletti (yellow card) 89'	Stadium: Stadio Olimpico; Attendance: 28,355; Referee: Andrea Gervasoni

15 February 2015 23	Udinese	0–1	Lazio	Udine
15:00 CET (UTC+01:00)	Wagué (yellow card) 22'; Allan (yellow card) 54'	Report	Candreva 23' (pen.), (yellow card) 63'; Onazi (yellow card) 29'; Cataldi (yellow card) 78'; Felipe Anderson (yellow card) 83'; Radu (yellow card) 88'	Stadium: Stadio Friuli; Attendance: 8,282; Referee: Davide Massa

22 February 2015 24	Lazio	2–1	Palermo	Rome
15:00 CET (UTC+01:00)	Mauri 33'; Parolo (yellow card) 36'; Radu (yellow card) 61'; Maurício (yellow card) 63'; Candreva 78'	Report	Quaison (yellow card) 23'; Dybala 26'; Jajalo (yellow card) 59'; Barreto (yellow card) 90+2' (yellow-red card) 90+4'; Rispoli (yellow card) 90+4'	Stadium: Stadio Olimpico; Attendance: 27,186; Referee: Marco Di Bello

1 March 2015 25	Sassuolo	0–3	Lazio	Reggio Emilia
15:00 CET (UTC+01:00)	Gazzola (yellow card) 22'; Bianco (yellow card) 39'; Longhi (yellow card) 63'; Taïder (yellow card) 76'	Report	Parolo (yellow card) 29', (goal) 77'; Keita (yellow card) 42'; Felipe Anderson 45'; Klose 70'	Stadium: Mapei Stadium – Città del Tricolore; Attendance: 11,807; Referee: Carmine Russo

9 March 2015 26	Lazio	4–0	Fiorentina	Rome
19:00 CET (UTC+01:00)	Biglia 6'; Maurício (yellow card) 48'; Candreva 65' (pen.), (yellow card) 65'; Klose 75', 85'	Report	Basanta (yellow card) 28'; Kurtić (yellow card) 63'; Tomović (yellow card) 64'	Stadium: Stadio Olimpico; Attendance: 33,025; Referee: Paolo Tagliavento

16 March 2015 27	Torino	0–2	Lazio	Turin
19:00 CET (UTC+01:00)	Maksimović (yellow card) 28'; Amauri (yellow card) 39'; El Kaddouri (yellow card) 51'	Report	Radu (yellow card) 49'; Felipe Anderson 71', 78'; Basta (yellow card) 89'	Stadium: Stadio Olimpico di Torino; Attendance: 12,932; Referee: Daniele Orsato

22 March 2015 28	Lazio	2–0	Hellas Verona	Rome
20:45 CET (UTC+01:00)	Felipe Anderson 4'; Candreva 45+2'	Report	Rodríguez (yellow card) 45+1'	Stadium: Stadio Olimpico; Attendance: 40,119; Referee: Davide Massa

4 April 2015 29	Cagliari	1–3	Lazio	Cagliari
15:00 CEST (UTC+02:00)	Sau 49'; Crisetig (yellow card) 60'; Rossettini (yellow card) 63'; Diakité (red card) 68'; M'Poku (yellow card) 78'; Balzano (yellow card) 90+1'	Report	Parolo (yellow card) 15', (goal) 90+2'; Maurício (yellow card) 22'; Klose 31'; Basta (yellow card) 55'; Biglia 60' (pen.); Keita (yellow card) 85'	Stadium: Stadio Sant'Elia; Attendance: 11,000; Referee: Gianluca Rocchi

12 April 2015 30	Lazio	4–0	Empoli	Rome
15:00 CEST (UTC+02:00)	Mauri 4'; Klose 31', (yellow card) 55'; Candreva 44'; Novaretti (yellow card) 46' (yellow-red card) 58'; Felipe Anderson 53'; Cana (yellow card) 75'; Cavanda (yellow card) 81'	Report		Stadium: Stadio Olimpico; Attendance: 49,096; Referee: Sebastiano Peruzzo

18 April 2015 31	Juventus	2–0	Lazio	Turin
20:45 CEST (UTC+02:00)	Tevez 17'; Bonucci 28'; Evra (yellow card) 50'; Marchisio (yellow card) 59'; Chiellini (yellow card) 63'	Report	Maurício (yellow card) 45+2'; Lulić (yellow card) 45+5'; Candreva (yellow card) 60'; Cana (yellow card) 68'; Cataldi (red card) 89'	Stadium: Juventus Stadium; Attendance: 38,916; Referee: Nicola Rizzoli

26 April 2015 32	Lazio	1–1	Chievo	Rome
15:00 CEST (UTC+02:00)	Klose 45'; Ledesma (yellow card) 47'; Onazi (yellow card) 57'	Report	Zukanović (yellow card) 10'; Radovanović (yellow card) 42'; Dainelli (yellow card) 49'; Cesar (yellow card) 66'; Paloschi 75'; Schelotto (yellow card) 84'	Stadium: Stadio Olimpico; Attendance: 45,359; Referee: Dino Tommasi

29 April 2015 33	Lazio	4–0	Parma	Rome
20:45 CEST (UTC+02:00)	Parolo 10'; Klose 13', (yellow card) 63'; Candreva 16'; Keita 81'	Report	Belfodil (yellow card) 20'; Mirante (yellow card) 27'; Varela (yellow card) 29'	Stadium: Stadio Olimpico; Attendance: 32,367; Referee: Gianpaolo Calvarese

3 May 2015 34	Atalanta	1–1	Lazio	Bergamo
15:00 CEST (UTC+02:00)	Masiello (yellow card) 32'; Biava 49'; Sportiello (yellow card) 85'	Report	Felipe Anderson (yellow card) 33'; Cataldi (yellow card) 37'; Ciani (yellow card) 45'; Basta (yellow card) 73'; Parolo 77'; Perea (yellow card) 80'; Maurício (yellow card) 90+5'	Stadium: Stadio Atleti Azzurri d'Italia; Attendance: 15,479; Referee: Daniele Orsato

10 May 2015 35	Lazio	1–2	Internazionale	Rome
20:45 CEST (UTC+02:00)	Candreva 8'; Maurício (red card) 24'; Mauri (yellow card) 24'; Marchetti (yellow card) 27' (red card) 61'; Biglia (yellow card) 71'	Report	D'Ambrosio (yellow card) 12'; Hernanes 26', 84', (yellow card) 67'; Nagatomo (yellow card) 90+2'	Stadium: Stadio Olimpico; Attendance: 47,367; Referee: Davide Massa

16 May 2015 36	Sampdoria	0–1	Lazio	Genoa
20:45 CEST (UTC+02:00)	Palombo (yellow card) 16'; Silvestre (yellow card) 40'	Report	Gentiletti 54'	Stadium: Stadio Luigi Ferraris; Attendance: 21,843; Referee: Paolo Mazzoleni

24 May 2015 37	Lazio	1–2	Roma	Rome
15:00 CEST (UTC+02:00)	Lulić (yellow card) 22'; Gentiletti (yellow card) 32'; Biglia (yellow card) 35'; Klose (yellow card) 62'; Đorđević 81'	Report	Totti (yellow card) 9'; Torosidis (yellow card) 52'; Iturbe 73', (yellow card) 74'; Yanga-Mbiwa 85'; Florenzi (yellow card) 87'	Stadium: Stadio Olimpico; Attendance: 49,385; Referee: Nicola Rizzoli

31 May 2015 38	Napoli	2–4	Lazio	Naples
20:45 CEST (UTC+02:00)	Higuaín 55', 64'; Ghoulam (yellow card) 66' (yellow-red card) 70'; Andújar (yellow card) 85'	Report	Đorđević (yellow card) 19'; Parolo 33', (yellow card) 55' (yellow-red card) 62'; Maurício (yellow card) 43'; Candreva 45+1', (yellow card) 88'; Lulić (yellow card) 75'; Onazi 85'; Klose 90+2'	Stadium: Stadio San Paolo; Attendance: 49,085; Referee: Gianluca Rocchi

=== Coppa Italia ===
24 August 2014 Third round	Lazio	7–0	Bassano	Rome
20:30 CEST (UTC+02:00)	Cana (yellow card) 4'; Candreva 46'; Keita 53', 68'; De Vrij 59'; Parolo 80'; Basta 87'; Klose 90+2'			Stadium: Stadio Olimpico; Attendance: 9,354; Referee: Marco Di Bello

2 December 2014 Fourth round	Lazio	3–0	Varese	Rome
16:00 CET (UTC+01:00)	Šimić 24' (o.g.); Đorđević 26'; Onazi (yellow card) 27'; Felipe Anderson (yellow card) 34', (goal) 80'		Zecchin (yellow card) 57'	Stadium: Stadio Olimpico; Attendance: 3,903; Referee: Luigi Nasca

14 January 2015 Round of 16	Torino	1–3	Lazio	Turin
21:00 CET (UTC+01:00)	Amauri (yellow card) 42'; Martínez 49', (yellow card) 90'; Padelli (red card) 55'; Gazzi (yellow card) 77'		Keita 12'; Klose 29'; Cavanda (yellow card) 52'; Ledesma 57' (pen.)	Stadium: Stadio Olimpico di Torino; Attendance: 4,305; Referee: Carmine Russo

27 January 2015 Quarter-finals	Milan	0–1	Lazio	Milan
20:45 CET (UTC+01:00)	Rami (yellow card) 64'		Biglia 38' (pen.); Cana (yellow card) 40' (yellow-red card) 45'; Keita (yellow card) 85'; Pereirinha (yellow card) 85'	Stadium: San Siro; Attendance: 9,672; Referee: Gianluca Rocchi

4 March 2015 Semi-finals; First leg	Lazio	1–1	Napoli	Rome
20:45 CET (UTC+01:00)	Klose 33', (yellow card) 66'; Basta (yellow card) 53'; Keita (yellow card) 79'		Britos (yellow card) 21'; Mesto (yellow card) 54'; Gabbiadini 58', (yellow card) 60'; Albiol (yellow card) 65'; Inler (yellow card) 83'	Stadium: Stadio Olimpico; Attendance: 27,000; Referee: Antonio Damato

8 April 2015 Semi-finals; Second leg	Napoli	0–1 (1–2 agg.)	Lazio	Naples
20:45 CEST (UTC+02:00)	Albiol (yellow card) 32'; De Guzmán (yellow card) 85'		Maurício (yellow card) 49'; Lulić 79'; Parolo (yellow card) 90+2'	Stadium: Stadio San Paolo; Attendance: 46,477; Referee: Daniele Orsato

20 May 2015 Final	Juventus	2–1 (a.e.t.)	Lazio	Rome
20:45 CEST (UTC+02:00)	Chiellini 11'; Evra (yellow card) 60'; Bonucci (yellow card) 64'; Matri 97', (yellow card) 97'		Radu 4'; Parolo (yellow card) 18'; Candreva (yellow card) 109'	Stadium: Stadio Olimpico; Attendance: 60,000; Referee: Daniele Orsato

== Statistics ==
=== Appearances and goals ===
No.	Pos	Nat	Player	Total		Serie A		Coppa Italia	
No.	Pos	Nat	Player	Apps	Goals	Apps	Goals	Apps	Goals
Goalkeepers
1	GK	(Albania) ALB	Etrit Berisha	16	0	8+2	0	6	0
22	GK	(Italy) ITA	Federico Marchetti	30	0	30	0	0	0
55	GK	(Italy) ITA	Guido Guerrieri	0	0	0	0	0	0
77	GK	(Albania) ALB	Thomas Strakosha	0	0	0	0	0	0
Defenders
2	DF	(France) FRA	Michaël Ciani	12	0	9+3	0	0	0
3	DF	(Netherlands) NED	Stefan de Vrij	35	1	29+1	0	5	1
5	DF	(Netherlands) NED	Edson Braafheid	18	0	12+4	0	2	0
8	DF	(Serbia) SRB	Dušan Basta	33	1	27	0	6	1
13	DF	(France) FRA	Abdoulay Konko	5	0	2	0	3	0
18	DF	(Argentina) ARG	Santiago Gentiletti	6	1	5	1	1	0
26	DF	(Romania) ROU	Ștefan Radu	29	1	24	0	5	1
27	DF	(Albania) ALB	Lorik Cana	20	0	15+2	0	3	0
33	DF	(Brazil) BRA	Maurício	17	0	14	0	3	0
39	DF	(Belgium) BEL	Luis Pedro Cavanda	17	0	15	0	2	0
85	DF	(Argentina) ARG	Diego Novaretti	7	0	2+3	0	2	0
Midfielders
6	MF	(Italy) ITA	Stefano Mauri	31	9	25+4	9	2	0
7	MF	(Brazil) BRA	Felipe Anderson	37	11	23+9	10	5	1
10	MF	(Brazil) BRA	Ederson	5	1	0+4	1	1	0
16	MF	(Italy) ITA	Marco Parolo	40	11	34	10	6	1
17	MF	(Portugal) POR	Bruno Pereirinha	5	0	2+1	0	2	0
19	MF	(Bosnia and Herzegovina) BIH	Senad Lulić	29	4	22+3	3	4	1
20	MF	(Argentina) ARG	Lucas Biglia	31	4	27	3	4	1
23	MF	(Nigeria) NGA	Ogenyi Onazi	19	1	6+10	1	3	0
24	MF	(Italy) ITA	Cristian Ledesma	16	1	7+6	0	3	1
32	MF	(Italy) ITA	Danilo Cataldi	21	0	11+5	0	5	0
87	MF	(Italy) ITA	Antonio Candreva	38	11	31+3	10	4	1
Forwards
9	FW	(Serbia) SRB	Filip Đorđević	26	9	15+9	8	2	1
11	FW	(Germany) GER	Miroslav Klose	40	16	21+13	13	6	3
14	FW	(Spain) ESP	Keita	28	4	6+17	1	5	3
34	FW	(Colombia) COL	Brayan Perea	7	0	0+5	0	2	0
78	FW	(Spain) ESP	Mamadou Tounkara	1	0	0	0	1	0
Players transferred out during the season
15	MF	(Uruguay) URU	Álvaro González	5	0	4	0	1	0

Last updated: 31 May 2015
Source: Competitions

=== Goalscorers ===
Rank	No.	Pos	Nat	Name	Serie A	Coppa Italia	Total
1	11	FW	(Germany)	Miroslav Klose	13	3	16
2	7	MF	(Brazil)	Felipe Anderson	10	1	11
2	16	MF	(Italy)	Marco Parolo	10	1	11
2	87	MF	(Italy)	Antonio Candreva	10	1	11
5	6	MF	(Italy)	Stefano Mauri	9	0	9
5	9	FW	(Serbia)	Filip Đorđević	8	1	9
7	14	FW	(Spain)	Keita	1	3	4
7	19	MF	(Bosnia and Herzegovina)	Senad Lulić	3	1	4
7	20	MF	(Argentina)	Lucas Biglia	3	1	4
10	3	DF	(Netherlands)	Stefan de Vrij	0	1	1
10	8	DF	(Serbia)	Dušan Basta	0	1	1
10	10	MF	(Brazil)	Ederson	1	0	1
10	18	DF	(Argentina)	Santiago Gentiletti	1	0	1
10	23	MF	(Nigeria)	Ogenyi Onazi	1	0	1
10	24	MF	(Italy)	Cristian Ledesma	0	1	1
10	26	DF	(Romania)	Ștefan Radu	0	1	1
Own goal					1	1	2
Totals					71	17	88

Last updated: 20 June 2015
