= Marco Parolo =

Italian footballer (born 1985)

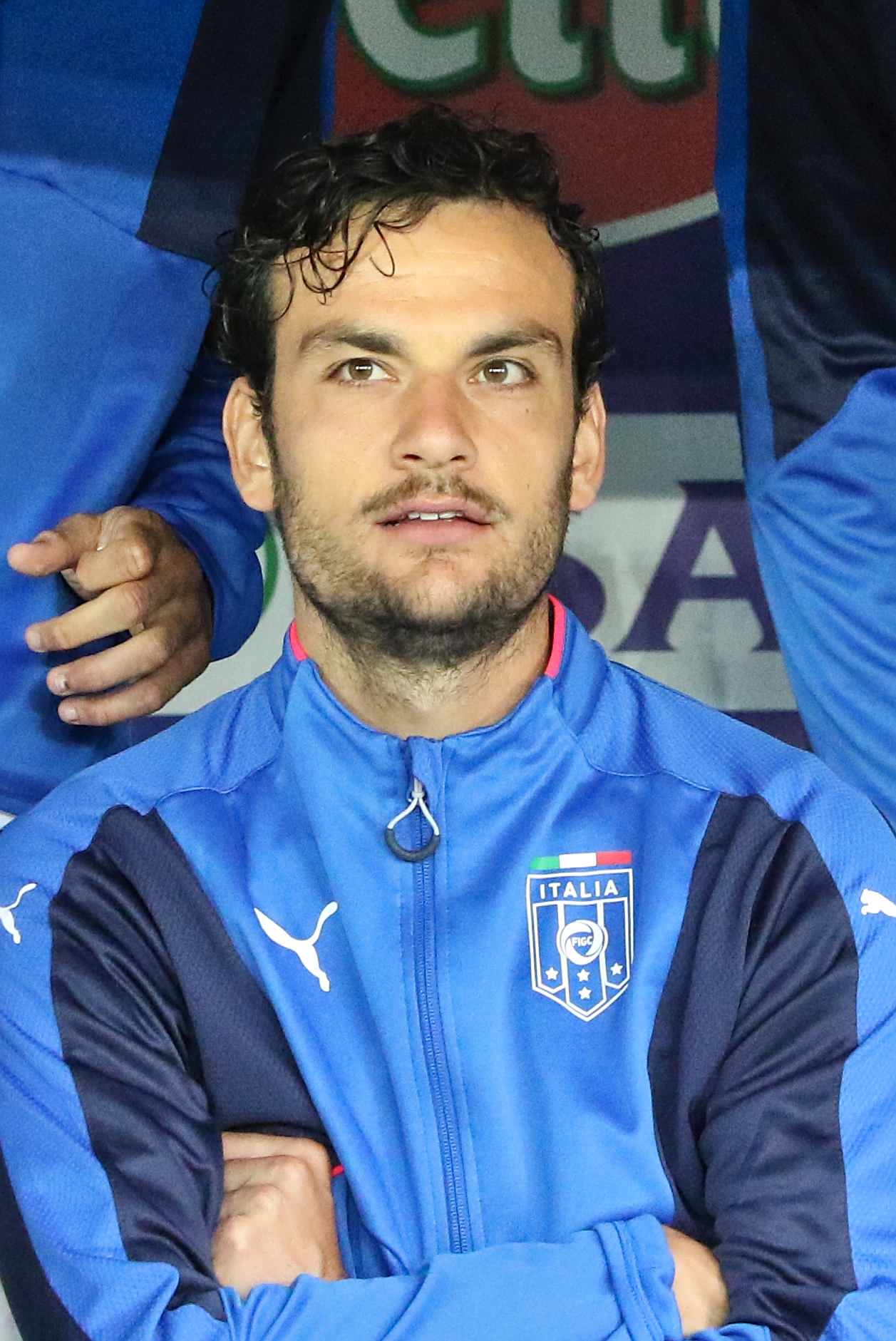
- Parolo with Italy in 2015

Personal information
- Full name: Marco Parolo
- Date of birth: 25 January 1985 (age 41)
- Place of birth: Gallarate, Italy
- Height: 1.86 m (6 ft 1 in)
- Position: Midfielder

Youth career
- 1996–1998: A.S.C.D. Torino Club
- 1998–2001: G.S. Soccer Boys
- 2001–2004: Como

Senior career*
Years	Team	Apps	(Gls)
2004–2005	Como	31	(3)
2005–2007	Pistoiese	52	(3)
2007–2008	Foligno	29	(3)
2008–2009	Verona	32	(4)
2009–2012	Cesena	104	(11)
2012–2014	Parma	72	(11)
2014–2021	Lazio	211	(27)
Total		531	(62)

International career
2011–2018	Italy	36	(0)
- * Club domestic league appearances and goals

Marco Parolo (Italian pronunciation: [ˈmarko paˈrɔːlo]; born 25 January 1985) is an Italian former professional footballer who played as a central midfielder.

During his club career, Parolo played for Como, Pistoiese, Foligno, Verona, Cesena, and Parma, before moving to Lazio in 2014. At international level, he represented Italy at the 2014 FIFA World Cup and at UEFA Euro 2016.

== Club career ==
=== Youth ===
Parolo played for A.S.C.D. Torino Club of Gallarate from 1996 to 1998 and G.S. Soccer Boys of Turbigo from 1998 to 2001, which the clubs received €18,000 (reduced from €36,000 by appeal) and €53,484.54 (increased from €50,902.26 by appeal) respectively from Cesena after Parolo made his Serie A debut in 2010, a solidarity contribution system to youth and amateur clubs. Parolo finished as the losing quarter-finalists in 2003 Primavera Reserve League for Calcio Como. He made 2 appearances in the playoffs round, as the substitutes of Greco and Caremi respectively. In 2004 Como reserve was eliminated by Inter reserve in the round of 16 of the playoffs round, in 6–0 aggregate loss. Parolo was in the starting XI in the two matches.

=== Como ===
Parolo made his professional debut at Como as a front-lying midfielder in a 4–4–1–1 formation on 19 September 2004, which he scored an own goal. Despite the own goal, La Gazzetta dello Sport gave a score of 6.5/10 to his debut, the 3rd highest score among his teammate. He remained with the club in the whole 2004–05 Serie C1 despite they were declared bankrupt in December 2004. Parolo was in the starting XI in Como's relegation "play-out", which the playoffs matches Como losing to Novara 2–1 on aggregate. Como folded at the end season as a takeover bid was denied.

=== Chievo ===
On 30 August 2005, Parolo was signed by Chievo but was immediately sent to Serie C1 club Pistoiese in a co-ownership deal, worth €10,000. Parolo made 52 league appearances in two seasons, including 38 starts.

In June 2007, Chievo bought back Parolo for around €15,000. In August 2007, Parolo was sent to another Serie C1 club Foligno for a peppercorn of €500. Parolo made 25 starts and four substitutes for Foligno in 2007–08 Serie C1. He also played twice in promotion playoffs, losing to Cittadella in the first round.

On 4 July 2008, Parolo returned to Chievo again for €50,000. He was immediately sold to "city rivals" Verona in another co-ownership deal for a fee of €250, along with Leonardo Moracci (co-ownership for €250) and Domenico Girardi (loan). In June 2009, Parolo and Moracci returned to Chievo for a peppercorn.

=== Cesena ===
Parolo joined Cesena on 10 July 2009 on a temporary deal, where he would rejoin former Foligno head coach Pierpaolo Bisoli, whom Parolo had previously played under during his short spell with Foligno. The club finished as the runner-up of 2009–10 Serie B season, winning promotion to Serie A for the 2010–11 Serie A season. In June 2010, Cesena exercised the rights to sign the player in a co-ownership deal, for a fee of €300,000, and Parolo signed a contract until 2013.

Parolo made his Serie A debut on 28 August 2010, in a goalless draw with A.S. Roma.

After a good season in which Parolo earned a national team call-up, Cesena bought the remaining 50% rights from Chievo for €3 million and extended his contract to 2015.

=== Parma ===
On 7 July 2012, Serie A club Parma signed Parolo on a loan, for €1 million. As part of the arrangement, they had the option to buy the player the following summer. Moreover, Gonçalo Brandão moved to Cesena as part of the temporary deal, with Parma subsidising €1.8 million to Cesena for Brandão's wage. The loan of Brandão was also followed by Rossi, which Parma also subsidized Cesena for €1.2 million. Parolo made 36 appearances in 2012–13 Serie A, only missing two matches due to suspension. He was handed the no.16 shirt by the club in 2012.

On 1 July 2013, Parma exercised the rights to sign Parolo from Cesena for €1 million, but part of a mega cashless player swap. (Note: Cesena signed Del Pivo for €1.5 million, Palumbo for €1.5 million, Adorni for €1 million and Đurić for €500; Parma signed Lapadula for €1.4 million, Benalouane for €600,000, Parolo and Paolini for €1 million each.) In the 2013–14 Serie A season Parma finished 6th, which earned them a place in the 2014–15 UEFA Europa League. However, Parma were not granted a UEFA licence by FIGC and the application was declined due to overdue tax. Thus the place went to 7th placed Torino, which hold a UEFA licence. Parolo made 36 appearances for them during 2013–14 Serie A season, again missing twice due to suspension.

=== Lazio ===
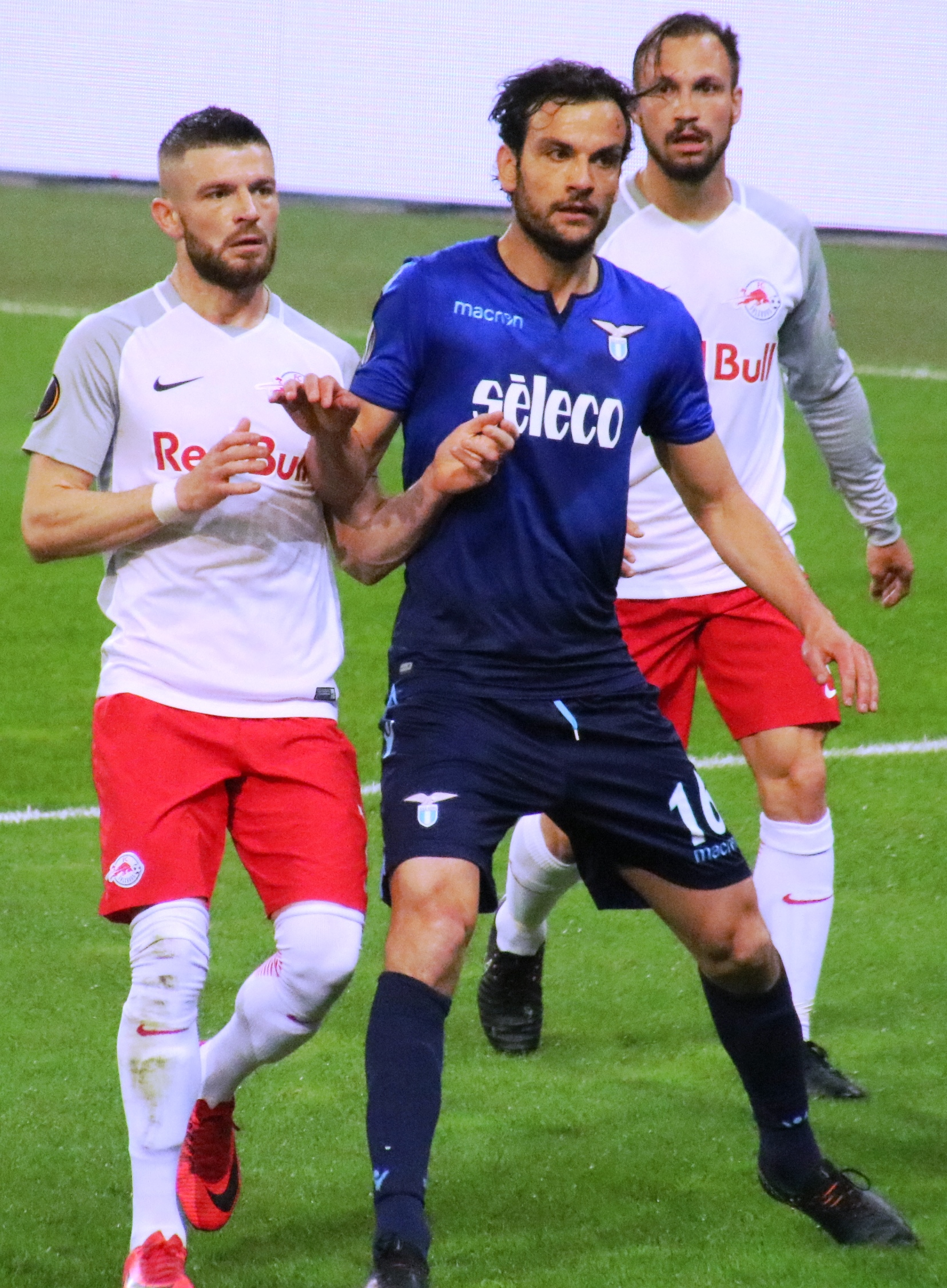
Parolo (blue shirt) playing for Lazio in 2018

On 30 June 2014, Claudio Lotito, chairman of Serie A club Lazio, announced the signing of Parolo from Parma, subject to a medical. The transfer fee was later revealed as €4.5 million.

On 19 October 2017, S.S. Lazio announced that Parolo had signed a new deal until June 2020. On 5 February 2017, Parolo scored four goals in a 6–2 away victory over Pescara.

He had become a fundamental part of Lazio's starting XI usually playing full matches and resting very little due to his high level of importance. He played in a holding midfield type of role where he often scored with frequent runs through the opposition's defense. On 8 November 2018, Parolo scored the opening goal of Lazio's fourth group stage game of the Europa League, helping his team to qualify for the knockout stage with two games to spare.

== International career ==
Parolo received his first national team call-up on 20 March 2011, for a friendly match and UEFA Euro 2012 qualifying. The technical director of Cesena, Lorenzo Minotti, hinted Parolo would receive a call-up on 15 March in an interview by il Resto del Carlino. He was subsequently selected by Cesare Prandelli as part of his 23-man squad for the 2014 FIFA World Cup, and made his debut in the competition playing as a substitute in the first game against England.

On 31 May 2016, he was named in Antonio Conte's 23-man Italy squad for UEFA Euro 2016.

== Style of play ==
An offensive-minded player, Parolo usually played as a mezzala, and was known for his tendency to make attacking runs from midfield, and also possessed a keen eye for goal due to his powerful, accurate shooting ability from distance, with either foot, and his strength in the air. A physical, reliable, and hard-working central, defensive, or box-to-box midfielder, he was also known for his stamina, positional sense, defensive qualities, and ability to break down opposing attacks, as well as his solid technique and distribution, while his efficient and intelligent passing game allowed him to start attacking plays after winning back possession. He was also deployed in other positions on occasion, including as a right–sided winger or makeshift wing-back in a 3–5–2 formation, or even as a central defender in a three–man back–line. Former fellow Italy, Parma, and Lazio midfielder Dino Baggio praised Parolo in 2013, and drew comparisons between their playing styles due to their eye for goal from midfield.

== Career statistics ==
=== Club ===
Appearances and goals by club, season and competition
Club	Season	League			Coppa Italia		Europe		Other		Total	
Club	Season	Division	Apps	Goals	Apps	Goals	Apps	Goals	Apps	Goals	Apps	Goals
Como	2004–05	Serie C1	31	3	3	0	—		2 (Note: Appearances in C1 play-out)	0	36	3
Pistoiese		Serie C1										
Pistoiese	2005–06	Serie C1	24	1	0	0	—		—		24	1
Pistoiese	2006–07	Serie C1	28	2	0	0	—		—		28	2
Pistoiese	Total		52	3	0	0	—		—		52	3
Foligno	2007–08	Serie C1	31	3	0	0	—		2	0	31	3
Hellas Verona	2008–09	Lega Pro Prima	32	4	0	0	—		—		32	4
Cesena	2009–10	Serie B	36	5	0	0	—		—		36	5
Cesena	2010–11	Serie A	37	5	1	0	—		—		38	5
Cesena	2011–12	Serie A	31	1	3	0	—		—		34	1
Cesena	Total		104	11	4	0	—		—		108	11
Parma (loan)	2012–13	Serie A	36	3	1	0	—		—		37	3
Parma	2013–14	Serie A	36	8	2	0	—		—		38	8
Parma	Total		72	11	3	0	—		—		75	11
Lazio
Lazio	2014–15	Serie A	34	10	6	1	—		—		40	11
Lazio	2015–16	Serie A	31	3	0	0	9	3	0 (Note: Appearances in Supercoppa Italiana)	0	40	6
Lazio	2016–17	Serie A	34	5	4	0	—		—		38	5
Lazio	2017–18	Serie A	31	4	3	0	8	2	1	0	43	6
Lazio	2018–19	Serie A	34	4	4	0	4	2	—		42	6
Lazio	2019–20	Serie A	29	1	2	1	5	0	1	0	37	2
Lazio	2020–21	Serie A	18	0	2	1	5	2	—		25	3
Lazio	Total		211	27	21	3	31	9	2	0	265	39
Career total			531	62	31	3	31	9	6	0	599	74

=== International ===
Appearances and goals by national team and year
National team	Year	Apps	Goals
Italy	2011	1	0
Italy	2012	0	0
Italy	2013	1	0
Italy	2014	6	0
Italy	2015	8	0
Italy	2016	13	0
Italy	2017	5	0
Italy	2018	2	0
Total		36	0

== Honours ==
Cesena

- Serie B runner-up: 2009–10

Lazio

- Coppa Italia: 2018–19; runner-up 2014–15
- Supercoppa Italiana: 2017, 2019; runner-up 2015
