= 2015 Supercoppa Italiana =

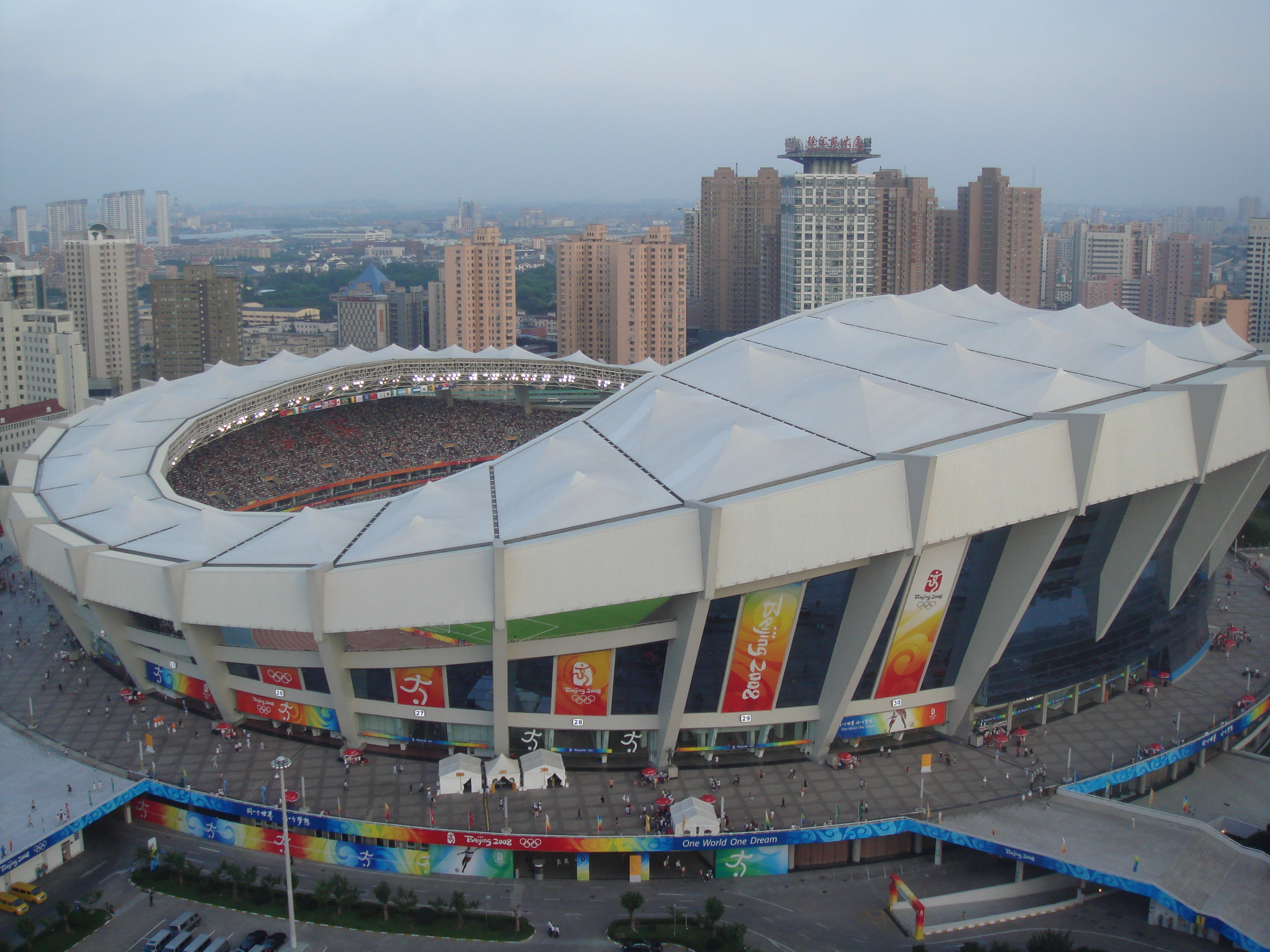
- The Shanghai Stadium hosted the match
- Event: Supercoppa Italiana
Juventus	Lazio
Serie A	Coppa Italia
2	0
- Date: 8 August 2015
- Venue: Shanghai Stadium, Shanghai, China
- Referee: Luca Banti
- Attendance: 20,000

The 2015 Supercoppa Italiana was the 28th edition of the Supercoppa Italiana. It was played on 8 August 2015 at the Shanghai Stadium in Shanghai, China. With Juventus winning both the 2014–15 Serie A championship and the 2014–15 Coppa Italia, the game was played between Juventus and the 2014–15 Coppa Italia runners-up, Lazio. Juventus won the game 2–0 for their record seventh title.

== Background ==
Juventus made a record 11th appearance, and won a record seventh cup in their fourth successive appearance in the Supercoppa, with an overall record of seven wins and four defeats. Lazio made its sixth appearance, and first since 2013, with an overall record of three wins and three defeats. The two teams had met twice before (1998, 2013), each winning once.

== Match ==
=== Details ===
8 August 2015
20:00 UTC+08:00

Juventus	2–0	Lazio
Mandžukić 69'; Dybala 73'	Report

Shanghai Stadium, Shanghai
Attendance: 20,000
Referee: Luca Banti

Juventus	Lazio

GK	1	(Italy) Gianluigi Buffon (c)
CB	15	(Italy) Andrea Barzagli
CB	19	(Italy) Leonardo Bonucci
CB	4	(Uruguay) Martín Cáceres
RWB	26	(Switzerland) Stephan Lichtsteiner
LWB	33	(France) Patrice Evra
RM	27	(Italy) Stefano Sturaro	(substituted off) 89'
CM	8	(Italy) Claudio Marchisio
LM	10	(France) Paul Pogba
CF	11	(France) Kingsley Coman	(substituted off) 60'
CF	17	(Croatia) Mario Mandžukić	(substituted off) 77'
Substitutes:
GK	25	(Brazil) Neto
GK	34	(Brazil) Rubinho
DF	2	(Chile) Mauricio Isla
DF	24	(Italy) Daniele Rugani
DF	42	(Italy) Giulio Parodi
MF	20	(Italy) Simone Padoin
MF	37	(Argentina) Roberto Pereyra	(substituted on) 89'
MF	40	(Italy) Mattia Vitale
MF	43	(Colombia) Andrés Tello
FW	7	(Italy) Simone Zaza
FW	14	(Spain) Fernando Llorente	(substituted on) 77'
FW	21	(Argentina) Paulo Dybala	(substituted on) 60'
Manager:
(Italy) Massimiliano Allegri

GK	22	(Italy) Federico Marchetti
RB	8	(Serbia) Dušan Basta
CB	6	(Argentina) Santiago Gentiletti
CB	3	(Netherlands) Stefan de Vrij
LB	26	(Romania) Ștefan Radu
RM	32	(Italy) Danilo Cataldi	(substituted off) 75'
CM	20	(Argentina) Lucas Biglia (c)
LM	23	(Nigeria) Ogenyi Onazi
AM	87	(Italy) Antonio Candreva
AM	10	(Brazil) Felipe Anderson	(substituted off) 87'
CF	11	(Germany) Miroslav Klose	(substituted off) 61'
Substitutes:
GK	55	(Italy) Guido Guerrieri
GK	99	(Albania) Etrit Berisha
DF	2	(Netherlands) Wesley Hoedt
DF	4	(Spain) Patric
DF	29	(France) Abdoulay Konko
DF	33	(Brazil) Maurício
MF	7	(England) Ravel Morrison	(substituted on) 87'
MF	21	(Serbia) Sergej Milinković-Savić
MF	70	(Australia) Chris Ikonomidis
FW	9	(Serbia) Filip Đorđević	(substituted on) 61'
FW	14	(Senegal) Keita
FW	88	(Netherlands) Ricardo Kishna	(substituted on) 75'
Manager:
(Italy) Stefano Pioli

== See also ==
- 2015–16 Serie A
- 2015–16 Coppa Italia
- 2015–16 Juventus FC season
- 2015–16 SS Lazio season

Played between same clubs:

- 1998 Supercoppa Italiana
- 2013 Supercoppa Italiana
- 2017 Supercoppa Italiana
- 2019 Supercoppa Italiana
