= Filip Đorđević =

Serbian footballer (born 1987)

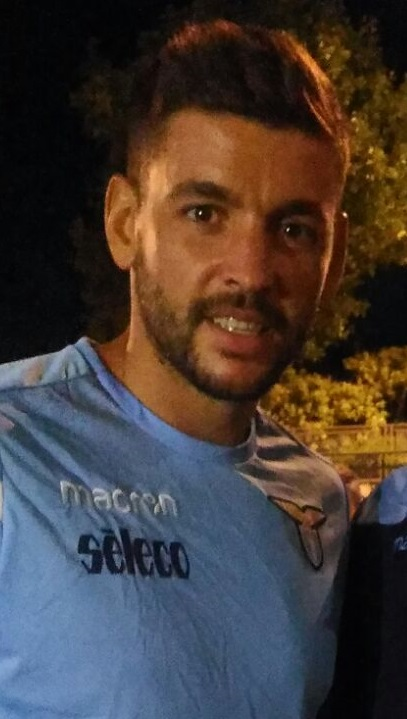
- Đorđević in 2017

Personal information
- Date of birth: 28 September 1987 (age 39)
- Place of birth: Belgrade, SR Serbia, Yugoslavia
- Height: 1.86 m (6 ft 1 in)
- Position: Forward

Youth career
- Radnički Beograd
- Red Star Belgrade

Senior career*
Years	Team	Apps	(Gls)
2005–2008	Red Star Belgrade	8	(0)
2006–2007	→ Rad (loan)	35	(16)
2008	→ Nantes (loan)	18	(7)
2008–2014	Nantes	163	(52)
2014–2018	Lazio	68	(11)
2018–2021	Chievo	73	(15)
Total		365	(101)

International career^{‡}
2007–2009	Serbia U21	14	(8)
2012–2014	Serbia	14	(4)
- * Club domestic league appearances and goals as of 13:49, 18 May 2021 (UTC) ‡ National team caps and goals as of 18 August 2020

Filip Đorđević (Serbian Cyrillic: Филип Ђорђевић, pronounced [fǐlip dʑǒːrdʑeʋitɕ]; born 28 September 1987) is a Serbian retired professional footballer who played as a forward.

Đorđević earned 14 caps and scored 4 goals for Serbia from 2012 to 2014.

== Club career ==
=== Early career ===
Born in Belgrade, Đorđević began his career at his hometown club Red Star Belgrade, where he spent eight years. He also spent time on loan at Rad. For Red Star, he only appeared in eight league games before moving to France.

=== Nantes ===
After being loaned to Ligue 2 side Nantes and helping them achieve promotion to the top-flight Ligue 1 after the 2007–08 season, Nantes agreed to sign him permanently to a four-year contract. In the club's return to Ligue 1, Đorđević featured in 19 league games and scored a total of two goals over the 2008–09 season, and Nantes was demoted to Ligue 2 again. In the subsequent 2009–10 season, he produced nearly identical statistics to the previous season, although Nantes remained in Ligue 2 following its campaign. Finally, Đorđević developed great consistency in the 2010–11 season and appeared in 36 league games, scoring a total of 12 goals and assisting on five occasions. In the 2011–12 season, with Nantes still in Ligue 2, Đorđević played 28 league games and scored six goals as well as providing five assists.

From the 2012–13 season, Đorđević exploded in form and directly contributed to Nantes' promotion at the end of the season. Over 34 league games, he scored 20 goals and was the top scorer of Ligue 2 at the end of the season. On 16 August 2013, Lyon allegedly proposed between €3 and 5 million for Đorđević, although Đorđević and Nantes declined the transfer. In the club's return to Ligue 1, Đorđević scored seven goals in the first 12 games, rivalling Radamel Falcao and Zlatan Ibrahimović for a top place in the Ligue's list of high scorers of the season.

=== Lazio ===
On 19 March 2014, Đorđević announced that he would be departing Nantes for Italian Serie A side Lazio. He signed a pre-contract agreement with Lazio after he entered the final six-months of his Nantes contract and joined the team on a free transfer on 1 July 2014. Đorđević's first goals for Lazio came on 29 September 2014, scoring a hat-trick as the club defeated Palermo 4–0, lifting the club into the top half of the Serie A table. He scored again in the club's next match, heading in an Antonio Candreva cross in the 25th minute, in a 3–2 home win over Sassuolo.

=== Chievo ===
On 13 June 2018, Chievo announced the signing of Đorđević when his contract expired on 30 June. The contract signed by the Serbian would last three years with an optional extension for a fourth year.

== International career ==
Đorđević was called up for the Serbia national team for 24 November 2007 Euro 2008 Group A qualifier at home against Kazakhstan, but did not make an appearance. Five years after his first call-up, Serbia head coach Siniša Mihajlović selected him for an exhibition match against Chile on 14 November 2012. He scored two minutes after entering the field as a substitute on his debut. After a 2014 World Cup qualifier against Macedonia on 15 October 2013, an image of completely naked Đorđević, accompanied by Nenad Tomović and Aleksandar Kolarov, leaked after a fan sneaked into the dressing room.

== Career statistics ==
=== Club ===
As of match played 13 May 2021

Appearances and goals by club, season and competition
Club	Season	League			National cup (Note: Includes Serbia and Montenegro Cup, Serbian Cup, Coupe de France, Coppa Italia)		League cup (Note: Includes Coupe de la Ligue)		Continental		Other		Total	
Club	Season	Division	Apps	Goals	Apps	Goals	Apps	Goals	Apps	Goals	Apps	Goals	Apps	Goals
Red Star Belgrade	2005–06	Serbia and Montenegro SuperLiga	1	0	2	0	—		0	0	—		3	0
Red Star Belgrade	2007–08	Serbian SuperLiga	7	0	1	0	—		6	0	—		14	0
Red Star Belgrade	Total		8	0	3	0	—		6	0	—		17	0
Rad (loan)	2006–07	Serbian First League	35	16			—		—		—		35	16
Nantes (loan)	2007–08	Ligue 2	18	7	1	0	0	0	—		—		19	7
Nantes	2008–09	Ligue 1	19	2	0	0	1	0	—		—		20	2
Nantes	2009–10	Ligue 2	19	2	1	0	0	0	—		—		20	2
Nantes	2010–11	Ligue 2	36	12	4	4	1	0	—		—		41	16
Nantes	2011–12	Ligue 2	28	6	2	1	1	0	—		—		31	7
Nantes	2012–13	Ligue 2	34	20	3	3	1	0	—		—		38	23
Nantes	2013–14	Ligue 1	27	10	0	0	2	2	—		—		29	12
Nantes	Total		181	59	11	8	6	2	—		—		198	69
Lazio	2014–15	Serie A	24	8	2	1	—		—		—		26	9
Lazio	2015–16	Serie A	27	3	1	0	—		3 (Note: Appearances in UEFA Europa League)	3	1	0	32	6
Lazio	2016–17	Serie A	17	0	1	1	—		—		—		18	1
Lazio	2017–18	Serie A	0	0	0	0	—		0	0	0	0	0	0
Lazio	Total		68	11	4	2	—		3	3	1	0	76	16
Chievo	2018–19	Serie A	13	1	1	0	—		—		—		14	1
Chievo	2019–20	Serie A	33	10	1	0	—		—		—		34	10
Chievo	2020–21	Serie A	27	4	0	0	—		—		—		27	4
Chievo	Total		73	15	2	0	—		—		—		75	15
Career total			365	101	21	10	6	2	9	3	1	0	401	116

=== International ===
Appearances and goals by national team and year
National team	Year	Apps	Goals
Serbia	2012	1	1
Serbia	2013	7	2
Serbia	2014	6	1
Total		14	4

Scores and results list Serbia's goal tally first, score column indicates score after each Đorđević goal.

List of international goals scored by Filip Đorđević
No.	Date	Venue	Opponent	Score	Result	Competition
1	14 November 2012	AFG Arena, St. Gallen, Switzerland	Chile	2–0	3–1	Friendly
2	10 September 2013	Cardiff City Stadium, Cardiff, Wales	Wales	1–0	3–0	2014 FIFA World Cup qualifying
3	15 November 2013	Zabeel Stadium, Dubai	Russia	1–1	1–1	Friendly
4	5 March 2014	Aviva Stadium, Dublin, Republic of Ireland	Republic of Ireland	2–1	2–1	Friendly

== Honours ==
Red Star Belgrade

- First League of Serbia and Montenegro: 2005–06
- Serbia and Montenegro Cup: 2005–06

Lazio

- Supercoppa Italiana: 2017; runner-up: 2015
- Coppa Italia runner-up: 2014–15, 2016–17

Individual

- Serbian First League Top Scorer: 2006–07
- Nantes Team of the Decade: 2010–2020

Records

- Fastest Goal in Ligue 1: 2013–14
- Fastest Debut Goal for Serbia
