= Giulio Parodi =

Italian footballer (born 1997)

Personal information
- Date of birth: 30 September 1997 (age 29)
- Place of birth: Bari, Italy
- Height: 1.88 m (6 ft 2 in)
- Position: Defender

Team information
- Current team: Latina
- Number: 32

Youth career
- Bari
- Juventus

Senior career*
Years	Team	Apps	(Gls)
2015–2021	Juventus	0	(0)
2016–2018	→ Pordenone (loan)	38	(2)
2018–2021	→ Juventus U23 (res.)	1	(0)
2021–2024	Pro Vercelli	36	(0)
2022–2023	→ Fermana (loan)	32	(1)
2024–2025	Foggia	24	(1)
2025–	Latina	25	(1)

International career^{‡}
2012	Italy U15	1	(0)
- * Club domestic league appearances and goals as of 1 May 2026 ‡ National team caps and goals as of 23 February 2012

Giulio Parodi (born 30 September 1997) is an Italian professional footballer who plays as a defender for Serie C Group B club Latina.

== Club career ==
=== Early career ===
Born in Bari, Parodi began his career as a player of hometown club A.S. Bari. He left Bari in 2013, when he was signed by Serie A reigning champions Juventus to play for their Primavera side.

=== Juventus ===
After impressing for the Primavera side, Parodi was named in the Juventus first-team squad twice in the 2014-15 season, remaining an unused substitute in the 2–0 win over Inter Milan and also in the 2–0 win over Lazio in the final of the 2015 Supercoppa Italiana. On 4 August 2016, Parodi was loaned to Lega Pro side Pordenone until June 2017. On 18 July 2017 the loan was extended for another year to 30 June 2018.

=== Pro Vercelli ===
On 15 January 2021, Parodi moved to Serie C club Pro Vercelli on a permanent deal. He missed most of the 2020–21 and 2021–22 seasons with an ACL rupture. On 24 August 2022, Parodi was loaned by Fermana.

=== Foggia ===
On 14 July 2024, Parodi joined Foggia for two seasons.

== International career ==
On 23 February 2012, Parodi played a friendly match for Italy U15 against Belgium U15.
