= Senad Lulić =

Bosnian footballer (born 1986)

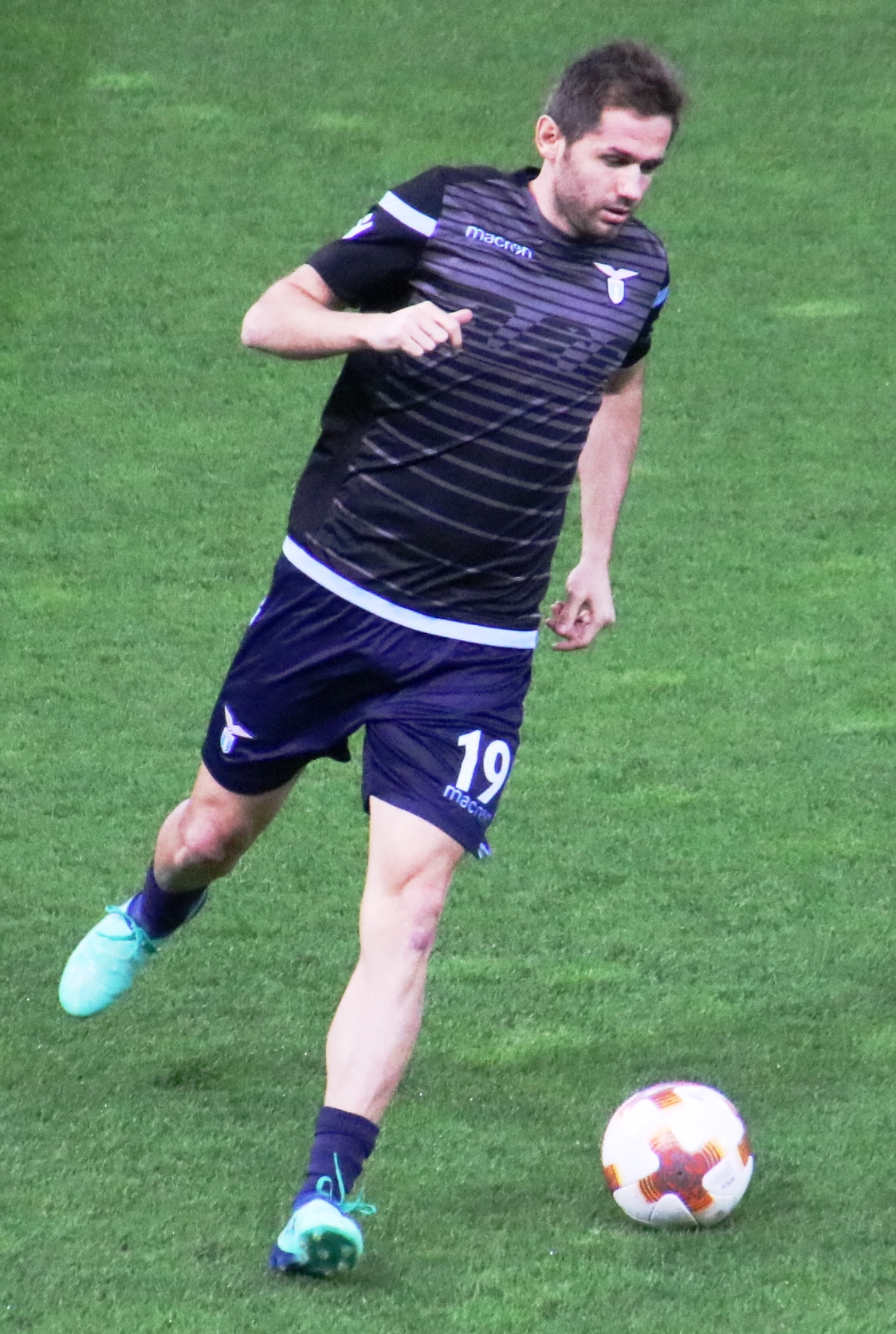
- Lulić with Lazio in 2018

Personal information
- Date of birth: 18 January 1986 (age 40)
- Place of birth: Mostar, SR Bosnia and Herzegovina, Yugoslavia
- Height: 1.83 m (6 ft 0 in)
- Position(s): Left midfielder, left winger, left-back

Youth career
- 1998–2003: Chur 97

Senior career*
| Years | Team | Apps | (Gls) |
| 2003–2006 | Chur 97 | 39 | (2) |
| 2006–2008 | Bellinzona | 63 | (13) |
| 2008–2010 | Grasshoppers | 41 | (6) |
| 2010–2011 | Young Boys | 31 | (6) |
| 2011–2021 | Lazio | 282 | (28) |
| Total | | 456 | (55) |

International career
| 2008–2017 | Bosnia and Herzegovina | 57 | (4) |
- * Club domestic league appearances and goals

Senad Lulić (pronounced [sěnad lǔlitɕ]; born 18 January 1986) is a Bosnian former professional footballer who most commonly played on the left side of the pitch, either as a wide midfielder, winger, or wing-back.

Lulić started his professional career at Chur 97, before joining Bellinzona in 2006. Two years later, he switched to Grasshoppers. In 2010, he was transferred to Young Boys. The following year, he moved to Lazio, where he ended up staying until his retirement in 2021.

Lulić made his senior international debut for Bosnia and Herzegovina in 2008, earning over 50 caps until 2017. He represented the nation at their first major championship, the 2014 FIFA World Cup.

== Club career ==
=== Early career ===
Because of the outbreak of the Bosnian War, Lulić's family fled from his native Bosnia and Herzegovina and moved to Switzerland, where he started playing football at a local club, Chur 97, whose youth setup he joined in 1998. He made his professional debut in 2003 at the age of 17.

In the summer of 2006, Lulić switched to Bellinzona.

In May 2008, he signed with Grasshopper.

In May 2010, he moved to Young Boys.

=== Lazio ===
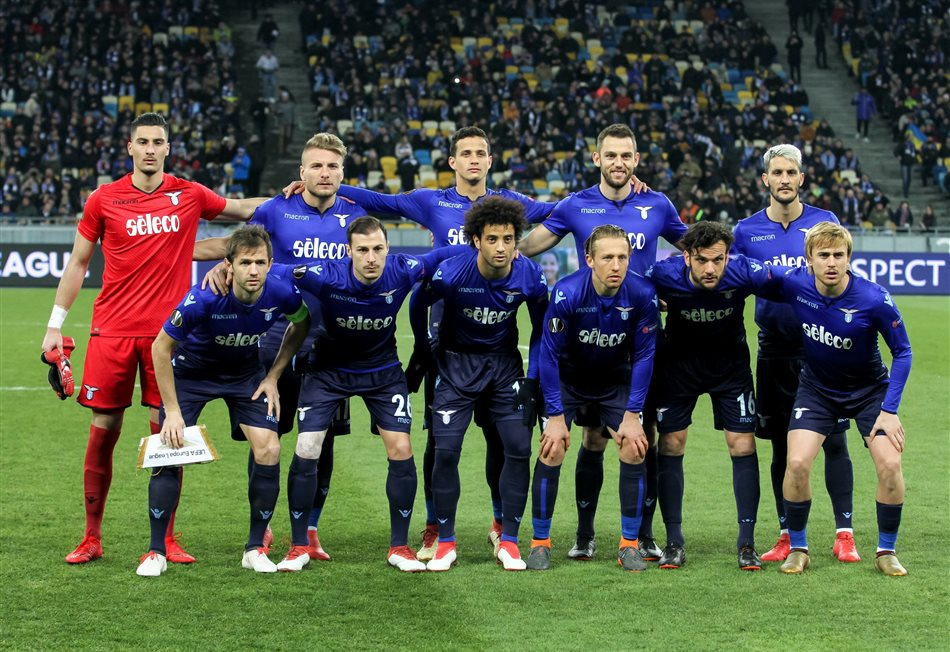
Lulić lining up for Lazio before a UEFA Europa League match against Dynamo Kyiv in March 2018

In June 2011, Lulić was transferred to Italian outfit Lazio for an undisclosed fee. He made his official debut for the team in the UEFA Europa League play-offs against Rabotnički on 18 August. Three weeks later, he made his league debut against Milan. On 23 October, he scored his first goal for Lazio in a triumph over Bologna. He won his first trophy with the club on 26 May 2013, by beating city rivals Roma in the Coppa Italia final. Lulić scored the only goal of the game in the 71st minute.

He played his 100th match for the side against Legia Warsaw on 28 November.

In January 2016, he signed a new four-year contract with Lazio.

He appeared in his 200th game for the team on 16 October.

In July 2017, Lulić was named club captain. He won his first title as captain on 13 August, by triumphing over Juventus in the 2017 Supercoppa Italiana.

Lulić entered Lazio's top 10 appearance makers on 29 November 2018, as he played his 294th game for the club against Apollon Limassol.

He played his 300th game for the side and managed to score a goal on 26 December.

On 7 December 2019, he played his 343rd match for Lazio and overtook Aldo Puccinelli as club's 5th all-time appearance maker.

Lulić debuted in the UEFA Champions League against Bayern Munich on 23 February 2021.

He announced his retirement from football on 1 June 2022.

== International career ==
In May 2008, Lulić received his first senior call-up to Bosnia and Herzegovina, for a friendly game against Azerbaijan, and debuted in that game on 1 June.

On 7 June 2013, in a 2014 FIFA World Cup qualifier against Latvia, Lulić scored his first senior international goal.

In June 2014, Lulić was named in Bosnia and Herzegovina's squad for the 2014 FIFA World Cup, country's first major competition. He made his tournament debut in the opening group match against Argentina on 15 June.

With six assists, Lulić was the best assist provider in the UEFA Euro 2016 qualifying, together with Arkadiusz Milik and Vladimír Weiss.

He retired from international football on 29 December 2017.

== Style of play ==
During his career, Lulić was often deployed as a left midfielder, left winger or left wing-back. He was known for his great stamina and pace.

== Personal life ==
Lulić married his long-time girlfriend Sandra in May 2005. They have three children, a daughter and two sons.

== Career statistics ==
=== Club ===
Appearances and goals by club, season and competition
| Club | Season | League | | | National cup (Note: Includes Swiss Cup, Coppa Italia) | | Continental | | Other | | Total | |
| Club | Season | Division | Apps | Goals | Apps | Goals | Apps | Goals | Apps | Goals | Apps | Goals |
|---|---|---|---|---|---|---|---|---|---|---|---|---|
| Bellinzona | 2006–07 | Swiss Challenge League | 30 | 3 | 2 | 0 | – | | 2 (Note: Appearances in Swiss Super League relegation play-offs) | 0 | 34 | 3 |
| Bellinzona | 2007–08 | Swiss Challenge League | 33 | 10 | 5 | 1 | – | | 2 | 2 | 40 | 13 |
| Bellinzona | Total | | 63 | 13 | 7 | 1 | – | | 4 | 2 | 74 | 16 |
| Grasshoppers | 2008–09 | Swiss Super League | 26 | 3 | 4 | 2 | 6 (Note: Two appearances in UEFA Cup, four appearances and two goals in UEFA Intertoto Cup) | 2 | – | | 36 | 7 |
| Grasshoppers | 2009–10 | Swiss Super League | 15 | 3 | 2 | 0 | – | | – | | 17 | 3 |
| Grasshoppers | Total | | 41 | 6 | 6 | 2 | 6 | 2 | – | | 53 | 10 |
| Young Boys | 2010–11 | Swiss Super League | 31 | 6 | 2 | 0 | 11 (Note: Four appearances and one goal in UEFA Champions League, seven appearances and two goals in UEFA Europa League) | 3 | – | | 44 | 9 |
| Lazio | 2011–12 | Serie A | 27 | 4 | 2 | 0 | 9 (Note: Appearances in UEFA Europa League) | 0 | – | | 38 | 4 |
| Lazio | 2012–13 | Serie A | 33 | 1 | 5 | 1 | 12 | 1 | – | | 50 | 3 |
| Lazio | 2013–14 | Serie A | 30 | 7 | 1 | 0 | 5 | 0 | 1 (Note: Appearance in Supercoppa Italiana) | 0 | 37 | 7 |
| Lazio | 2014–15 | Serie A | 25 | 3 | 4 | 1 | – | | – | | 29 | 4 |
| Lazio | 2015–16 | Serie A | 30 | 3 | 1 | 0 | 8 (Note: Two appearances in UEFA Champions League, six appearances in UEFA Europa League) | 0 | – | | 39 | 3 |
| Lazio | 2016–17 | Serie A | 31 | 3 | 4 | 0 | – | | – | | 35 | 3 |
| Lazio | 2017–18 | Serie A | 35 | 3 | 4 | 1 | 10 | 1 | 1 | 0 | 50 | 5 |
| Lazio | 2018–19 | Serie A | 35 | 4 | 4 | 0 | 7 | 0 | – | | 46 | 4 |
| Lazio | 2019–20 | Serie A | 20 | 0 | 1 | 0 | 5 | 0 | 1 | 1 | 27 | 1 |
| Lazio | 2020–21 | Serie A | 16 | 0 | 2 | 0 | 2 (Note: Appearances in UEFA Champions League) | 0 | – | | 20 | 0 |
| Lazio | Total | | 282 | 28 | 28 | 3 | 58 | 2 | 3 | 1 | 371 | 34 |
| Career total | | | 417 | 53 | 43 | 6 | 75 | 7 | 7 | 3 | 542 | 69 |

=== International ===
Appearances and goals by national team and year
| National team | Year | Apps | Goals |
|---|---|---|---|
| Bosnia and Herzegovina | 2008 | 1 | 0 |
| Bosnia and Herzegovina | 2009 | 0 | 0 |
| Bosnia and Herzegovina | 2010 | 4 | 0 |
| Bosnia and Herzegovina | 2011 | 11 | 0 |
| Bosnia and Herzegovina | 2012 | 7 | 0 |
| Bosnia and Herzegovina | 2013 | 8 | 1 |
| Bosnia and Herzegovina | 2014 | 8 | 0 |
| Bosnia and Herzegovina | 2015 | 8 | 1 |
| Bosnia and Herzegovina | 2016 | 5 | 0 |
| Bosnia and Herzegovina | 2017 | 5 | 2 |
| Total | | 57 | 4 |

Scores and results list Bosnia and Herzegovina's goal tally first, score column indicates score after each Lulić goal.

List of international goals scored by Senad Lulić
| No. | Date | Venue | Cap | Opponent | Score | Result | Competition |
|---|---|---|---|---|---|---|---|
| 1 | 7 June 2013 | Skonto Stadium, Riga, Latvia | 26 | Latvia | 1–0 | 5–0 | 2014 FIFA World Cup qualification |
| 2 | 6 September 2015 | Bilino Polje, Zenica, Bosnia and Herzegovina | 43 | Andorra | 3–0 | 3–0 | UEFA Euro 2016 qualifying |
| 3 | 28 March 2017 | Elbasan Arena, Elbasan, Albania | 53 | Albania | 2–0 | 2–1 | Friendly |
| 4 | 3 September 2017 | Estádio Algarve, Faro/Loulé, Portugal | 56 | Gibraltar | 3–0 | 4–0 | 2018 FIFA World Cup qualification |

== Honours ==
Lazio

- Coppa Italia: 2012–13, 2018–19
- Supercoppa Italiana: 2017, 2019
