= Ogenyi Onazi =

Nigerian footballer (born 1992)

Ogenyi Onazi MON
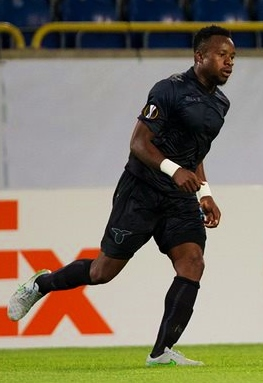
- Onazi with Lazio

Personal information
- Full name: Ogenyi Eddy Onazi
- Date of birth: 25 December 1992 (age 33)
- Place of birth: Jos, Nigeria
- Height: 1.72 m (5 ft 8 in)
- Position: Midfielder

Youth career
- El Kanemi Warriors
- My People
- Bodens BK
- 2011–2012: Lazio

Senior career*
Years	Team	Apps	(Gls)
2010–2011	El Kanemi Warriors	35	(7)
2012–2016	Lazio	76	(4)
2016–2019	Trabzonspor	69	(6)
2020	Denizlispor	9	(0)
2020–2021	SønderjyskE	2	(0)
2021	Žalgiris	19	(2)
2021	Denizlispor	11	(0)
2022	Al-Adalah	15	(0)
2022–2023	Casertana	11	(0)
2023	East Riffa	0	(0)
2023	Kitchee	3	(0)
2023–2024	Avezzano	14	(0)
2025	Charlotte Independence	0	(0)
2025	Acireale	1	(0)
2026	Babrungas	4	(0)

International career^{‡}
2009	Nigeria U17	7	(0)
2011	Nigeria U20	5	(0)
2012–2018	Nigeria	52	(1)
Medal record
Representing Nigeria
Africa Cup of Nations
Winner	2013 South Africa
Men's Football
FIFA U-17 World Cup
Runner-up	2009 Nigeria	U-17 Team
- * Club domestic league appearances and goals as of 13 November 2023 ‡ National team caps and goals as of 14 October 2019

Ogenyi Eddy Onazi MON (born 25 December 1992) is a Nigerian professional footballer who currently plays as a midfielder.

He has also played for the Nigeria national team, with whom he won the Africa Cup of Nations in 2013.

== Club career ==
=== Early years ===
Onazi began playing football in the streets of Jos in 1998. His skills drew a lot of attention afforded him the opportunity to play in some academies in the city.

His footballing abilities came to prominence when he moved to the city of Lagos to play for My People.

=== Lazio ===
Onazi joined Lazio in 2011, alongside his teammate, Sani Emmanuel. The pair trialled in England, Greece and Italy following appearances at the 2009 FIFA U-17 World Cup, in which Nigeria reached the final on home soil, losing to Switzerland.

Onazi was first promoted to the Lazio first team during the 2011–12 season after appearing at youth level. He made his Serie A debut as a substitute in the penultimate match of the season, replacing Senad Lulić in the 90th minute. Lazio recorded a 2–0 victory over Atalanta at the Stadio Atleti Azzurri d'Italia in Bergamo.

In the following 2012–2013 season, Onazi was granted more playing time Under coach Vladimir Petković featuring in a defensive midfielder role alongside Cristian Ledesma. Notably, he started in a UEFA Europa League match against Tottenham Hotspur at White Hart Lane, which ended in a 0–0 draw. On 7 March 2013, he scored his first goal for Lazio against Stuttgart in the last sixteen of the Europa League. He scored his first Serie A goal in a 3–1 win over Inter Milan on 8 May 2013.

On 13 April 2014, he scored his second Serie A goal for Lazio in a 4–2 defeat to Napoli.

On 22 September 2014, Onazi signed a two-year contract extension with Lazio until 2018. Lazio had previously received transfer enquiries in the summer transfer window by three Premier League clubs Everton, Southampton and Sunderland with interest from German, French, Spanish and Russian clubs also being reported. On 31 May 2015, his 88th-minute goal for the final score of 3–2 in Lazio's win over Napoli helped secure the last Champions League place for the club.

=== Trabzonspor ===
On 2 August 2016, Onazi moved to Trabzonspor for €3.5 million.

=== Denizlispor ===
On 15 January 2020, Denizlispor confirmed the arrival of Onazi from Trabzonspor, another club of Turkey's top-tier football league, on a free transfer. it was said that Onazi and Denizlispor reached an agreement for a six-month contract with an option for a further one year. He had a contract with Trabzonspor until May 2020.

=== SønderjyskE ===
On 4 October 2020, Onazi joined Danish Superliga team SønderjyskE on a deal for the 2020–21 season with an option to extend the deal with two further years. He was released by the club on 5 January 2021, three months after arriving.

=== Žalgiris ===
On 18 February 2021, Onazi signed for Lithuanian champions Žalgiris. On 13 July 2021, he scored his first goal for the club against Linfield in the Champions League qualifying stage.

On 18 August 2021, he left FK Žalgiris. In 2021 A Lyga he played 19 matches and scored two goals.

=== Denizlispor ===
On 20 August 2021, Onazi joined Turkish side Denizlispor.

=== Al-Adalah ===
On 19 January 2022, Onazi joined Saudi side Al-Adalah.

=== Casertana ===
On 29 August 2022, Onazi returned to Italy after six years, as he officially joined Serie D side Casertana.

=== Kitchee ===
On 12 July 2023, Onazi joined Hong Kong Premier League club Kitchee.

=== Avezzano ===
In December 2023 he joined Italian Serie D team Avezzano Calcio.

=== Charlotte Independence ===
On 24 April 2025, USL League One side Charlotte Independence announced Onazi joined the squad for the remainder of the 2025 season.

== International career ==
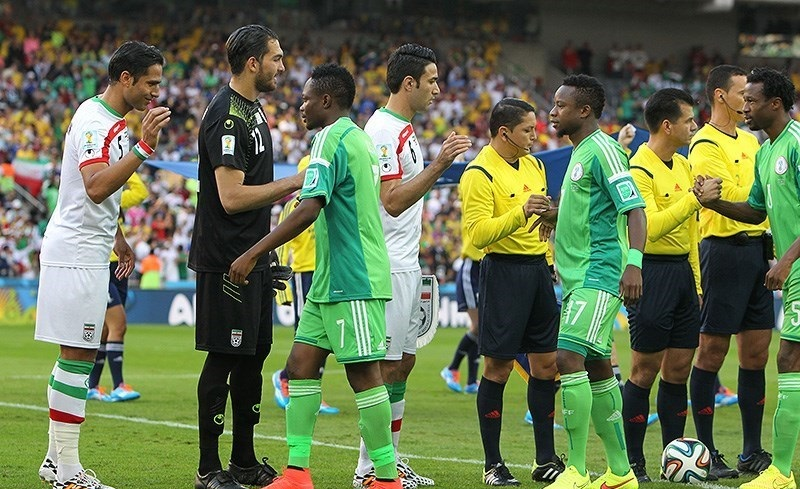
Onazi with Nigeria at 2014 FIFA World Cup against Iran

As a 16-year-old, Onazi represented his country at the 2009 FIFA U-17 World Cup, where Nigeria finished runners-up. However, he was overlooked for selection at the 2011 FIFA U-20 World Cup two years later, despite participating in the training camps in Portugal and Panama.

He made his debut for the senior Nigeria national team in an African Cup of Nations qualification match against Liberia. His first goal came in his second international match, a 3–1 friendly win over Venezuela in Florida.

Onazi was called up to Nigeria's 23-man squad for the 2013 Africa Cup of Nations. He came on as a substitute in Nigeria's first match of the tournament against Burkina Faso, whom they would eventually face again in the final, before going to on to play every minute of all Nigeria's games in the knockout phase, including the final.

He was selected for Nigeria's squad at the 2013 FIFA Confederations Cup. but missed out of the tournament as he suffered a slight knee knock a few weeks before the competition.

Onazi was named in Nigeria's final squad for the 2014 FIFA World Cup in Brazil and started in all four games as Nigeria were eliminated by France in the round of 16. He was also part of the squad for the 2018 FIFA World Cup in Russia, though he did not feature in any of the team's three matches. Onazi was expectedly left out of the national teams provisional squad to AFCON 2019 after failing to fully recover from an Achilles injury suffered in December 2018 while playing for his club in Turkey.

== Personal life ==
In November 2019, Onazi said he would help pay for Sani Emmanuel's medical expenses.

Onazi started his football career from Nigeria Premier Football League (NPFL), spark and moved his craft to Europe where he later established himself.

== Career statistics ==
=== Club ===
As of match played 23 December 2018

Appearances and goals by club, season and competition
Club	Season	League			National cup		Continental		Other		Total	
Club	Season	Division	Apps	Goals	Apps	Goals	Apps	Goals	Apps	Goals	Apps	Goals
Lazio	2011–12	Serie A	1	0	0	0	–		–		1	0
Lazio	2012–13	Serie A	15	1	2	0	11	1	–		28	2
Lazio	2013–14	Serie A	29	1	2	0	8	1	1	0	40	2
Lazio	2014–15	Serie A	16	1	3	0	–		–		19	1
Lazio	2015–16	Serie A	15	1	0	0	6	1	1	0	22	2
Lazio	Total		76	4	7	0	25	3	2	0	110	7
Trabzonspor	2016–17	Süper Lig	32	2	6	0	–		–		38	2
Trabzonspor	2017–18	Süper Lig	21	2	2	1	–		–		23	3
Trabzonspor	2018–19	Süper Lig	16	2	0	0	–		–		16	2
Trabzonspor	Total		69	6	8	1	0	0	0	0	77	7
Career total			145	10	15	1	25	3	2	0	187	14

=== International ===
As of match played 22 June 2018

Appearances and goals by national team and year
National team	Year	Apps	Goals
Nigeria	2012	2	1
Nigeria	2013	15	0
Nigeria	2014	13	0
Nigeria	2015	7	0
Nigeria	2016	5	0
Nigeria	2017	5	0
Nigeria	2018	4	0
Total		51	1

== Honours ==
Lazio

- Coppa Italia: 2012–13

Trabzonspor

- Turkish Cup: 2019–20

Nigeria

- African Cup of Nations: 2013

Orders

- Member of the Order of the Niger
