= Jemelka =

Jemelka is a Czech surname, its female form is Jemelková. Notable people with the surname include:

- Miroslav Jemelka (1931–2021), Czechoslovak sprint canoeist
- Otto Jemelka (1914–2008), Czechoslovak modern pentathlete
- Václav Jemelka (born 1995), Czech footballer
