= Santiago Gentiletti =

Argentine footballer

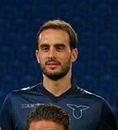
- Gentiletti with Lazio in 2015

Personal information
- Full name: Santiago Juan Gentiletti Selak
- Date of birth: 9 January 1985 (age 41)
- Place of birth: Gödeken, Argentina
- Height: 1.86 m (6 ft 1 in)
- Position: Centre-back

Senior career*
Years	Team	Apps	(Gls)
2003–2008	Gimnasia LP	68	(1)
2008	Provincial Osorno	8	(1)
2009	O'Higgins	30	(0)
2010–2011	Argentinos Juniors	50	(2)
2011–2012	Brest	15	(2)
2012–2014	San Lorenzo	51	(2)
2014–2016	Lazio	24	(1)
2016–2018	Genoa	19	(0)
2018–2019	Albacete	31	(0)
2019–2021	Newell's Old Boys	32	(1)
- * Club domestic league appearances and goals

Santiago Juan Gentiletti Selak (born 9 January 1985) is an Argentine former professional footballer who played as a centre-back.

== Career ==
Gentiletti played over 68 games for Gimnasia de La Plata before signing for Provincial Osorno of Chile in 2008. In 2009, he played for O'Higgins, also of Chile.

In 2010, he was signed by Argentinos Juniors and immediately established himself as an important member of the first team squad under manager Claudio Borghi. He was an important member of the team that won the Clausura 2010 championship having played in 16 of the club's 19 games and scored one goal during their championship winning campaign. In August 2011 he was signed by the French Ligue 1 club Stade Brestois 29 on a loan deal. In August 2014, after winning Copa Libertadores with San Lorenzo from Argentina, he moved to an Italian club, Lazio.

On 18 July 2016, he moved to Genoa.

On 29 August 2018, Gentiletti joined Segunda División side Albacete Balompié.

On 25 June 2019, Gentiletti joined to his country club Newell's Old Boys.

Having been injured for almost a year, Gentiletti retired from professional football on the 12th of July 2021.

== Honours ==
Argentinos Juniors

- Argentine Primera División: 2010 Clausura

San Lorenzo

- Argentine Primera División: 2013 Inicial
- Copa Libertadores: 2014
