= 2018–19 SS Lazio season =

Lazio
2018–19 season
- President: Claudio Lotito
- Manager: Simone Inzaghi
- Stadium: Stadio Olimpico
- Serie A: 8th
- Coppa Italia: Winners
- UEFA Europa League: Round of 32
- Top goalscorer: League: Ciro Immobile (15); All: Ciro Immobile (19)
- Biggest win: 4–1 vs SPAL; 4–1 vs Novara; 4–1 vs Parma; 3–0 vs Roma
- Biggest defeat: 1–4 vs Eintracht Frankfurt
Home colours	Away colours	Third colours

The 2018–19 season was the 118th season in Società Sportiva Lazio's history and their 31st consecutive season in the top-flight of Italian football. Lazio competed in Serie A, the Coppa Italia and the Europa League.

The season was coach Simone Inzaghi's third in charge of the club, having led Lazio to consecutive fifth-placed finishes in the 2016–17 and 2017–18 seasons. Lazio won the 2018–19 Coppa Italia 2–0 over Atalanta, winning their seventh title overall.

== Players ==
=== Squad information ===
As of 26 May 2019

No.	Name	Nat	Position(s)	Date of birth (Age at end of season)	Signed from	Signed in	Contract ends	Apps.	Goals	Notes
Goalkeepers
1	Thomas Strakosha	(Albania)	GK	19 March 1995 (aged 24)	(Italy) Youth Sector	2013	2022	94	0	
23	Guido Guerrieri	(Italy)	GK	25 February 1996 (aged 23)	(Italy) Youth Sector	2014	2021	1	0	
24	Silvio Proto	(Belgium)	GK	23 May 1983 (aged 36)	(Greece) Olympiacos	2018	2021	2	0	
31	Marius Adamonis	(Lithuania)	GK	13 May 1997 (aged 22)	(Italy) Youth Sector	2017	2022	0	0	
Defenders
3	Luiz Felipe	(Brazil)	CB	22 March 1997 (aged 22)	(Brazil) Ituano	2016	2022	35	1	
4	Patric	(Spain)	RB / RWB / RM / CM	17 April 1993 (aged 26)	(Spain) Barcelona	2015	2022	54	0	
5	Jordan Lukaku	(Belgium)	LB / LWB / LM	25 July 1994 (aged 24)	(Belgium) Oostende	2016	2019	53	1	
8	Dušan Basta	(Serbia)	RB / RWB / RM	18 August 1984 (aged 34)	(Italy) Udinese	2015	2019	88	1	
13	Wallace	(Brazil)	CB	14 October 1994 (aged 24)	(Portugal) Braga	2016	2021	54	1	
14	Riza Durmisi	(Denmark)	LB / LWB	8 January 1994 (aged 25)	(Spain) Real Betis	2018	2023	10	0	
15	Bastos	(Angola)	CB	27 March 1991 (aged 28)	(Russia) Rostov	2016	2020	50	5	
26	Ștefan Radu	(Romania)	LB / CB	22 October 1986 (aged 32)	(Romania) Dinamo București	2008	2021	278	4	
33	Francesco Acerbi	(Italy)	CB	10 February 1988 (aged 31)	(Italy) Sassuolo	2018	2023	37	3	
77	Adam Marušić	(Montenegro)	RB / RWB / RM	17 October 1992 (aged 26)	(Belgium) Oostende	2017	2022	58	4	
Midfielders
6	Lucas Leiva	(Brazil)	DM	9 January 1987 (aged 32)	(England) Liverpool	2017	2020	63	2	
7	Valon Berisha	(Kosovo)	CM	7 February 1993 (aged 26)	(Austria) Red Bull Salzburg	2017	2021	8	0	
10	Luis Alberto	(Spain)	AM / SS / LW	28 September 1992 (aged 26)	(England) Liverpool	2016	2022	70	16	
11	Joaquín Correa	(Argentina)	AM / LW	13 August 1994 (aged 24)	(Spain) Sevilla	2018	2023	34	5	
16	Marco Parolo	(Italy)	CM	25 January 1985 (aged 34)	(Italy) Parma	2014	2020	164	26	Vice-captain
19	Senad Lulić	(Bosnia and Herzegovina)	LM / LB / LWB	18 January 1986 (aged 33)	(Switzerland) Young Boys	2011	2020	246	28	Captain
21	Sergej Milinković-Savić	(Serbia)	CM / AM	27 February 1995 (aged 24)	(Belgium) Genk	2015	2022	125	22	
25	Milan Badelj	(Croatia)	DM / CM	25 February 1989 (aged 30)	(Italy) Fiorentina	2018	2022	23	1	
27	Rômulo	(Brazil)	MF	22 May 1987 (aged 32)	(Italy) Genoa	2019	2019	10	0	Loan
32	Danilo Cataldi	(Italy)	CM / DM	6 August 1994 (aged 24)	(Italy) Youth Sector	2013	2020	59	4	
66	Bruno Jordão	(Portugal)	CM	12 October 1998 (aged 20)	(Portugal) Braga	2017	2019	3	0	Loan
Forwards
17	Ciro Immobile	(Italy)	ST	20 February 1990 (aged 29)	(Spain) Sevilla	2016	2022	105	67	
20	Felipe Caicedo	(Ecuador)	ST	5 September 1988 (aged 30)	(Spain) Espanyol	2017	2020	50	11	
30	Pedro Neto	(Portugal)	LW / RW	9 March 2000 (aged 19)	(Portugal) Braga	2017	2019	4	0	Loan
Players transferred during the season
9	Alessandro Rossi	(Italy)	ST	3 January 1997 (aged 22)	(Italy) Youth Sector	2015	2020	3	0	
22	Martín Cáceres	(Uruguay)	CB / RB / LB	7 April 1987 (aged 32)	(Italy) Hellas Verona	2018	2019	10	1	
28	Joseph Minala	(Cameroon)	CM	16 August 1996 (aged 22)	(Italy) Youth Sector	2014	2022	3	0	
48	Lorenzo Filippini	(Italy)	LB	28 July 1995 (aged 23)	(Italy) Youth Sector	2014	2019	0	0	
87	Cristiano Lombardi	(Italy)	RW / LW	19 August 1995 (aged 23)	(Italy) Youth Sector	2013	2022	18	1	
96	Alessandro Murgia	(Italy)	CM / DM	9 August 1996 (aged 22)	(Italy) Youth Sector	2016	2022	31	2	

== Transfers ==
=== In ===
Date	Pos.	Player	Age	Moving from	Fee	Notes	Source
22 June 2018	DF	(Denmark) Riza Durmisi	23	(Spain) Real Betis	€6.5M		
29 June 2018	MF	(Italy) Mattia Sprocati	25	(Italy) Salernitana			
3 July 2018	MF	(Kosovo) Valon Berisha	25	(Austria) Red Bull Salzburg	€7.5M		
4 July 2018	GK	(Belgium) Silvio Proto	35	(Greece) Olympiacos	Free		
11 July 2018	DF	(Italy) Francesco Acerbi	30	(Italy) Sassuolo	€10M	€10M + €2M in bonuses	
1 August 2018	MF	(Croatia) Milan Badelj	29	Unattached	Free		
1 August 2018	MF	(Argentina) Joaquín Correa	23	(Spain) Sevilla	€16M		

==== Loans in ====
Date	Pos.	Player	Age	Moving from	Fee	Notes	Source
31 January 2019	MF	(Brazil) Rômulo	31	(Italy) Genoa		Season-long loan	

=== Out ===
Date	Pos.	Player	Age	Moving to	Fee	Notes	Source
1 July 2018	FW	(Serbia) Filip Đorđević	30	(Italy) Chievo	Free	End of contract	
1 July 2018	DF	(Netherlands) Stefan de Vrij	26	(Italy) Internazionale		End of contract	
1 July 2018	GK	(Italy) Federico Marchetti	35	(Italy) Genoa		End of contract	
15 July 2018	MF	(Brazil) Felipe Anderson	25	(England) West Ham United	€40.5M		
3 August 2018	MF	(Italy) Luca Crecco	22	(Italy) Pescara			
11 September 2018	MF	(Australia) Chris Ikonomidis	23	(Australia) Perth Glory			

==== Loans out ====
Date	Pos.	Player	Age	Moving to	Fee	Notes	Source
3 July 2018	FW	(Senegal) Mamadou Tounkara	22	(Switzerland) Schaffhausen		Season-long loan	
17 August 2018	MF	(Italy) Mattia Sprocati	25	(Italy) Parma			
17 August 2018	FW	(Brazil) André Anderson	18	(Italy) Salernitana		On loan until June 2019	
15 January 2019	FW	(Italy) Cristiano Lombardi	23	(Italy) Venezia	Loan	Loan until the end of the season	
29 January 2019	DF	(Uruguay) Martín Cáceres	31	(Italy) Juventus	€0.6M	On loan until June 2019	
30 January 2019	MF	(Italy) Alessandro Murgia	22	(Italy) SPAL		On loan until June 2019	
14 February 2019	MF	(England) Ravel Morrison	26	(Sweden) Östersund			

== Pre-season and friendlies ==
18 July 2018 Friendly	Lazio	20–0	Auronzo	Auronzo di Cadore, Italy
17:00 CEST (UTC+2)	Cataldi 5'; Wallace 8'; Caicedo 10'; Murgia 22'; Marušić 30'; Leiva 36'; Rossi 55', 59', 65', 68', 74', 88', 90'; Minala 58', 77'; Sprocati 61', 82'; Lombardi 69'; Jordão 83', 85'	Report		Stadium: Stadio Rodolfo Zandegiacomo; Referee: Davide Faraon

22 July 2018 Friendly	Lazio	14–0	Top 11 Radio Club 103	Auronzo di Cadore, Italy
17:00 CEST (UTC+2)	Parolo 6', 45'; Immobile 11', 26'; Berisha 31'; Luis Alberto 38'; Leiva 42'; Caicedo 46'; Neto 51', 65'; Rossi 76', 79', 90'; Cataldi 89'	Report		Stadium: Stadio Rodolfo Zandegiacomo; Referee: Leonardo Tesi

25 July 2018 Friendly	Lazio	3–0	Triestina	Auronzo di Cadore, Italy
	Minala 14'; Immobile 59'; Lulić 80'	Report		Stadium: Stadio Rodolfo Zandegiacomo; Referee: Carlo Rinaldi

28 July 2018 Friendly	Lazio	3–0	SPAL	Auronzo di Cadore, Italy
	Immobile 53'; Caicedo 82'; Rossi 90'	Report		Stadium: Stadio Rodolfo Zandegiacomo; Referee: Luca Zufferli

4 August 2018 Friendly	Arsenal (England)	2–0	(Italy) Lazio	Stockholm, Sweden
20:00 CEST (UTC+2)	Nelson 18'; Aubameyang 64'; Holding (yellow card) 77'	Report		Stadium: Friends Arena; Referee: Martin Strömbergsson (Sweden)

12 August 2018 Friendly	Borussia Dortmund (Germany)	1–0	(Italy) Lazio	Essen, Germany
17:30 CEST (UTC+2)	Reus 6'	Report		Stadium: Stadion Essen; Attendance: 9,650; Referee: Martin Thomsen

== Competitions ==
=== Serie A ===
==== League table ====
Pos	Team	Pld	W	D	L	GF	GA	GD	Pts	Qualification or relegation
6	Roma	38	18	12	8	66	48	+18	66	Qualification for the Europa League group stage
7	Torino	38	16	15	7	52	37	+15	63	Qualification for the Europa League second qualifying round
8	Lazio	38	17	8	13	56	46	+10	57 (Note: Lazio were deducted 2 points by the Italian Football Federation.)	Qualification for the Europa League group stage (Note: Lazio qualified for the Europa League group stage by winning the 2018–19 Coppa Italia)
9	Sampdoria	38	15	8	15	60	51	+9	53	
10	Bologna	38	11	11	16	48	56	−8	44	

Source: Serie A, Soccerway
Rules for classification: 1) Points; 2) Head-to-head points; 3) Head-to-head goal difference; 4) Goal difference; 5) Goals scored; 6) Draw. (Note: Head-to-head record is used only after all the matches between the teams in question have been played).

==== Results summary ====
Overall								Home						Away					
Pld	W	D	L	GF	GA	GD	Pts	W	D	L	GF	GA	GD	W	D	L	GF	GA	GD
38	17	8	13	56	46	+10	57	9	5	5	36	25	+11	8	3	8	20	21	−1

Last updated: 26 May 2019.
Source: Competitive matches

==== Results by round ====
Round	1	2	3	4	5	6	7	8	9	10	11	12	13	14	15	16	17	18	19	20	21	22	23	24	25	26	27	28	29	30	31	32	33	34	35	36	37	38
Ground	H	A	H	A	H	A	A	H	A	H	H	A	H	A	H	A	H	A	H	A	H	A	H	A	H	H	A	H	A	A	H	A	H	A	H	A	H	A
Result	L	L	W	W	W	W	L	W	W	L	W	D	D	D	D	L	W	W	D	L	L	W	W	L	W	W	D	W	W	L	D	L	L	W	L	W	D	L
Position	15	19	16	8	5	4	7	4	4	4	5	4	4	5	5	5	4	4	4	6	8	7	7	7	8	8	8	7	6	6	7	7	8	8	8	8	8	8

Updated to match(es) played on 26 May 2019. Source: Competitive matches
A = Away; H = Home; W = Win; D = Draw; L = Loss

==== Matches ====
18 August 2018 1	Lazio	1–2	Napoli	Rome
20:30 CEST (UTC+02:00)	Immobile 25'	Report	Milik 45+2'; Insigne 59'	Stadium: Stadio Olimpico; Attendance: 38,764; Referee: Luca Banti

25 August 2018 2	Juventus	2–0	Lazio	Turin
18:00 CEST (UTC+02:00)	Pjanić 30'; Alex Sandro (yellow card) 45+1'; Mandžukić 75'; Douglas Costa (yellow card) 81'; Can (yellow card) 87'	Report	Parolo (yellow card) 52'; Milinković-Savić (yellow card) 66'	Stadium: Allianz Stadium; Attendance: 40,173; Referee: Massimiliano Irrati

2 September 2018 3	Lazio	1–0	Frosinone	Rome
20:30 CEST (UTC+02:00)	Parolo (yellow card) 20'; Luis Alberto 49'	Report	Brighenti (yellow card) 3'; Ghiglione (yellow card) 90+2'	Stadium: Stadio Olimpico; Attendance: 34,465; Referee: Gianpaolo Calvarese

16 September 2018 4	Empoli	0–1	Lazio	Empoli
18:00 CEST (UTC+02:00)	Silvestre (yellow card) 7'; Bennacer (yellow card) 34'	Report	Parolo (yellow card) 42', (goal) 47'; Durmisi (yellow card) 80'; Marušić (yellow card) 87'	Stadium: Stadio Carlo Castellani; Attendance: 10,832; Referee: Daniele Orsato

23 September 2018 5	Lazio	4–1	Genoa	Rome
15:00 CEST (UTC+02:00)	Caicedo 7'; Immobile 23', 89'; Milinković-Savić 53'; Badelj (yellow card) 80'	Report	Spolli (yellow card) 11'; Bessa (yellow card) 45+1'; Piątek 46'	Stadium: Stadio Olimpico; Attendance: 31,382; Referee: Rosario Abisso

26 September 2018 6	Udinese	1–2	Lazio	Udine
19:00 CEST (UTC+02:00)	Badelj 80' (o.g.); Pussetto (yellow card) 85'; Troost-Ekong (yellow card) 90+1'	Report	Lulić (yellow card) 42'; Acerbi 61'; Correa 66'; Immobile (yellow card) 81'; Badelj (yellow card) 85'; Bastos (yellow card) 87'; Durmisi (yellow card) 89'; Strakosha (yellow card) 90+6'	Stadium: Dacia Arena; Attendance: 19,455; Referee: Fabio Maresca

29 September 2018 7	Roma	3–1	Lazio	Rome
15:00 CEST (UTC+02:00)	Lo. Pellegrini 45', (yellow card) 66'; Olsen (yellow card) 57'; Džeko (yellow card) 62'; Kolarov 71'; Fazio 86'	Report	Immobile 67'; Badelj (yellow card) 70'	Stadium: Stadio Olimpico; Attendance: 47,600; Referee: Gianluca Rocchi

7 October 2018 8	Lazio	1–0	Fiorentina	Rome
15:00 CEST (UTC+02:00)	Lulić (yellow card) 26'; Caicedo (yellow card) 34'; Immobile 37'; Marušić (yellow card) 52'; Correa (yellow card) 69'; Strakosha (yellow card) 82'	Report	Pjaca (yellow card) 35'; Gerson (yellow card) 45+3'; Vitor Hugo (yellow card) 70'	Stadium: Stadio Olimpico; Attendance: 32,886; Referee: Daniele Orsato

21 October 2018 9	Parma	0–2	Lazio	Parma
15:00 CEST (UTC+02:00)	Gobbi (yellow card) 32'; Siligardi (yellow card) 47'	Report	Lucas (yellow card) 30'; Luis Alberto (yellow card) 50'; Immobile 81' (pen.); Milinković-Savić (yellow card) 88'; Correa 90+4'	Stadium: Stadio Ennio Tardini; Attendance: 18,969; Referee: Michael Fabbri

29 October 2018 10	Lazio	0–3	Internazionale	Rome
20:30 CET (UTC+01:00)	Immobile (yellow card) 31'; Radu (yellow card) 48'; Cataldi (yellow card) 71'	Report	Brozović (yellow card) 19', (goal) 41'; Asamoah (yellow card) 26'; Icardi 28', 70'; Vrsaljko (yellow card) 49'	Stadium: Stadio Olimpico; Attendance: 40,068; Referee: Massimiliano Irrati

4 November 2018 11	Lazio	4–1	SPAL	Rome
12:30 CET (UTC+01:00)	Acerbi (yellow card) 19'; Immobile 26', 35'; Cataldi 59'; Parolo 70'	Report	Antenucci 28'; Everton Luiz (yellow card) 57'; Felipe (yellow card) 69'; Cionek (yellow card) 76'	Stadium: Stadio Olimpico; Attendance: 35,573; Referee: Marco Guida

11 November 2018 12	Sassuolo	1–1	Lazio	Reggio Emilia
18:00 CET (UTC+01:00)	Ferrari 15'; Duncan (yellow card) 23'; Adjapong (yellow card) 51'; Marlon (yellow card) 71'; Locatelli (yellow card) 76'	Report	Parolo 8'; Radu (yellow card) 28'; Luis Alberto (yellow card) 41'; Luiz Felipe (yellow card) 54'	Stadium: Mapei Stadium – Città del Tricolore; Attendance: 11,317; Referee: Gianpaolo Calvarese

25 November 2018 13	Lazio	1–1	Milan	Rome
18:00 CET (UTC+01:00)	Milinković-Savić (yellow card) 33'; Correa 90+4'	Report	Kessié 78'; G. Donnarumma (yellow card) 87'	Stadium: Stadio Olimpico; Attendance: 38,269; Referee: Luca Banti

2 December 2018 14	Chievo	1–1	Lazio	Verona
18:00 CET (UTC+01:00)	Depaoli (yellow card) 22'; Pellissier 25'; Radovanović (yellow card) 51'; Rossettini (yellow card) 60'; Cacciatore (yellow card) 90+5'	Report	Radu (yellow card) 29'; Immobile 66'; Correa (yellow card) 90+4'	Stadium: Stadio Marc'Antonio Bentegodi; Attendance: 11,500; Referee: Fabio Maresca

8 December 2018 15	Lazio	2–2	Sampdoria	Rome
20:30 CET (UTC+01:00)	Caicedo (yellow card) 6'; Immobile (yellow card) 45', (goal) 90+6' (pen.); Wallace (yellow card) 69'; Acerbi 79'	Report	Quagliarella 21'; Bereszyński (yellow card) 40' (yellow-red card) 90+2'; Audero (yellow card) 57'; Linetty (yellow card) 90'; Andersen (yellow card) 90+5'; Saponara 90+9', (yellow card) 90+9'	Stadium: Stadio Olimpico; Attendance: 28,988; Referee: Davide Massa

17 December 2018 16	Atalanta	1–0	Lazio	Bergamo
20:30 CET (UTC+01:00)	Zapata 1', (yellow card) 50'; Djimsiti (yellow card) 88'	Report	Parolo (yellow card) 38'; Wallace (yellow card) 62'; Lukaku (yellow card) 87'; Acerbi (yellow card) 90+3'	Stadium: Stadio Atleti Azzurri d'Italia; Attendance: 17,401; Referee: Daniele Orsato

22 December 2018 17	Lazio	3–1	Cagliari	Rome
12:30 CET (UTC+01:00)	Milinković-Savić 12'; Acerbi 23'; Lulić 67'; Bastos (yellow card) 90+2'; Immobile (yellow card) 90+5'	Report	Faragò (yellow card) 59'; João Pedro 90+3' (pen.)	Stadium: Stadio Olimpico; Attendance: 31,033; Referee: Gianluca Manganiello

26 December 2018 18	Bologna	0–2	Lazio	Bologna
15:00 CET (UTC+01:00)	Calabresi (yellow card) 45'; Palacio (yellow card) 81'	Report	Luiz Felipe 30'; Lulić 90'	Stadium: Stadio Renato Dall'Ara; Attendance: 19,230; Referee: Luca Pairetto

29 December 2018 19	Lazio	1–1	Torino	Rome
15:00 CET (UTC+01:00)	Correa (yellow card) 27'; Luiz Felipe (yellow card) 57'; Milinković-Savić 62'; Luis Alberto (yellow card) 75'; Marušić (red card) 86'; Lucas (yellow card) 90+1'	Report	Djidji (yellow card) 14'; Izzo (yellow card) 41'; Belotti 45+3' (pen.); Lukić (yellow card) 80'; Rincón (yellow card) 90'; Meïté (red card) 90'	Stadium: Stadio Olimpico; Attendance: 41,128; Referee: Massimiliano Irrati

20 January 2019 20	Napoli	2–1	Lazio	Naples
20:30 CET (UTC+01:00)	Callejón 34'; Milik 37'; Zieliński (yellow card) 88'	Report	Milinković-Savić (yellow card) 20'; Acerbi (yellow card) 36' (yellow-red card) 70'; Immobile 65'; Luis Alberto (yellow card) 87'; Lulić (yellow card) 90+1'	Stadium: Stadio San Paolo; Attendance: 19,448; Referee: Gianluca Rocchi

27 January 2019 21	Lazio	1–2	Juventus	Rome
20:30 CET (UTC+01:00)	Lucas (yellow card) 50'; Can 59' (o.g.); Milinković-Savić (yellow card) 80'	Report	Can (yellow card) 24'; Matuidi (yellow card) 49'; De Sciglio (yellow card) 70'; Rugani (yellow card) 73'; Cancelo 74'; Chiellini (yellow card) 80'; Ronaldo 88' (pen.)	Stadium: Stadio Olimpico; Attendance: 60,687; Referee: Marco Guida

4 February 2019 22	Frosinone	0–1	Lazio	Frosinone
19:00 CET (UTC+01:00)	Ciano (yellow card) 66'	Report	Parolo (yellow card) 29'; Caicedo 36', (yellow card) 44'; Lucas (yellow card) 61'; Strakosha (yellow card) 80'; Durmisi (yellow card) 90+3'	Stadium: Stadio Benito Stirpe; Attendance: 14,242; Referee: Michael Fabbri

7 February 2019 23	Lazio	1–0	Empoli	Rome
20:30 CET (UTC+01:00)	Caicedo 42' (pen.); Neto (yellow card) 90+4'	Report	Acquah (yellow card) 89'	Stadium: Stadio Olimpico; Attendance: 28,121; Referee: Daniele Chiffi

17 February 2019 24	Genoa	2–1	Lazio	Genoa
15:00 CET (UTC+01:00)	Sanabria 75'; Romero (yellow card) 79'; Pandev (yellow card) 90+1'; Criscito 90+3', (yellow card) 90+4'	Report	Badelj 44', (yellow card) 90'; Patric (yellow card) 70'	Stadium: Stadio Luigi Ferraris; Attendance: 19,936; Referee: Luca Banti

2 March 2019 26	Lazio	3–0	Roma	Rome
20:30 CET (UTC+01:00)	Caicedo 12'; Lulić (yellow card) 55'; Immobile 73' (pen.); Milinković-Savić (yellow card) 77'; Cataldi 89', (yellow card) 90'; Radu (yellow card) 90+3'	Report	Juan Jesus (yellow card) 5'; Fazio (yellow card) 72'; Džeko (yellow card) 90+2'; Kolarov (yellow card) 90+3' (yellow-red card) 90+3'	Stadium: Stadio Olimpico; Attendance: 53,112; Referee: Paolo Mazzoleni

10 March 2019 27	Fiorentina	1–1	Lazio	Florence
20:30 CET (UTC+01:00)	Ceccherini (yellow card) 42'; Veretout (yellow card) 45'; Muriel 61'; Simeone (yellow card) 90+1'	Report	Immobile 23', (yellow card) 52'	Stadium: Stadio Artemio Franchi; Attendance: 28,727; Referee: Daniele Orsato

17 March 2019 28	Lazio	4–1	Parma	Rome
15:00 CET (UTC+01:00)	Marušić 22'; Luis Alberto 26' (pen.), 38'; Lulić 44'	Report	Inglese (yellow card) 52'; Alves (yellow card) 63'; Sprocati 77'	Stadium: Stadio Olimpico; Attendance: 42,863; Referee: Luca Banti

31 March 2019 29	Internazionale	0–1	Lazio	Milan
20:30 CEST (UTC+02:00)		Report	Milinković-Savić 13'	Stadium: San Siro; Attendance: 56,348; Referee: Paolo Mazzoleni

3 April 2019 30	SPAL	1–0	Lazio	Ferrara
21:00 CEST (UTC+02:00)	Lazzari (yellow card) 82'; Petagna 89' (pen.); Paloschi (yellow card) 90+3'	Report	Milinković-Savić (yellow card) 57'; Immobile (yellow card) 63'; Strakosha (yellow card) 90+4'; Durmisi (yellow card) 90+4'; Parolo (yellow card) 90+5'	Stadium: Stadio Paolo Mazza; Attendance: 13,415; Referee: Marco Guida

7 April 2019 31	Lazio	2–2	Sassuolo	Rome
18:00 CEST (UTC+02:00)	Parolo (yellow card) 31'; Immobile 53' (pen.); Badelj (yellow card) 78'; Lulić 90+5'	Report	Locatelli (yellow card) 52'; Rogério 57'; Berardi 89'	Stadium: Stadio Olimpico; Attendance: 37,487; Referee: Rosario Abisso

13 April 2019 32	Milan	1–0	Lazio	Milan
20:30 CEST (UTC+02:00)	Kessié 79' (pen.); Zapata (yellow card) 90+5'	Report	Rômulo (yellow card) 9'; Luis Alberto (yellow card) 85'	Stadium: San Siro; Attendance: 61,216; Referee: Gianluca Rocchi

17 April 2019 25	Lazio	2–0	Udinese	Rome
19:00 CET (UTC+01:00)	Caicedo 21'; Sandro 24' (o.g.); Luiz Felipe (yellow card) 28'; Lucas (yellow card) 78'	Report		Stadium: Stadio Olimpico; Attendance: 30,162; Referee: Gianpaolo Calvarese
Note: Match originally scheduled for 25 February 2019.

20 April 2019 33	Lazio	1–2	Chievo	Rome
15:00 CEST (UTC+02:00)	Milinković-Savić (red card) 34'; Caicedo 67'	Report	Depaoli (yellow card) 40'; Vignato 49'; Hetemaj 51', (yellow card) 90+4'; Rigoni (yellow card) 55'; Dioussé (yellow card) 73'	Stadium: Stadio Olimpico; Attendance: 33,012; Referee: Daniele Chiffi

28 April 2019 34	Sampdoria	1–2	Lazio	Genoa
18:00 CEST (UTC+02:00)	Ferrari (yellow card) 22'; Ramírez (yellow card) 23' (yellow-red card) 45'; Quagliarella 57'; Tonelli (yellow card) 74'; Murru (yellow card) 90'; Sala (yellow card) 90+4'	Report	Caicedo 3', 19'; Acerbi (yellow card) 32'; Wallace (yellow card) 71'; Lulić (yellow card) 90+2'	Stadium: Stadio Luigi Ferraris; Attendance: 18,450; Referee: Fabio Maresca

5 May 2019 35	Lazio	1–3	Atalanta	Rome
15:00 CEST (UTC+02:00)	Parolo 3'; Bastos (yellow card) 26'; Caicedo (yellow card) 41'; Lucas (yellow card) 60'; Correa (yellow card) 87'	Report	Zapata 22'; Masiello (yellow card) 36'; Gómez (yellow card) 54'; Castagne 58'; Wallace 76' (o.g.); Mancini (yellow card) 83'	Stadium: Stadio Olimpico; Attendance: 32,984; Referee: Gianpaolo Calvarese

11 May 2019 36	Cagliari	1–2	Lazio	Cagliari
18:00 CEST (UTC+02:00)	Barella (yellow card) 85'; Pavoletti 90+1'; Cacciatore (yellow card) 90+4'	Report	Radu (yellow card) 14'; Badelj (yellow card) 26'; Luis Alberto 31'; Correa 53'; Proto (yellow card) 64'; Luiz Felipe (yellow card) 90+4'	Stadium: Sardegna Arena; Attendance: 16,179; Referee: Michael Fabbri

20 May 2019 37	Lazio	3–3	Bologna	Rome
20:30 CEST (UTC+02:00)	Correa 14', (yellow card) 66'; Bastos 59'; Lucas (yellow card) 67'; Milinković-Savić 80'	Report	Poli 50'; Destro 51', (yellow card) 52'; Orsolini 63'	Stadium: Stadio Olimpico; Attendance: 35,644; Referee: Fabrizio Pasqua

26 May 2019 38	Torino	3–1	Lazio	Turin
15:00 CEST (UTC+02:00)	Falque 51'; Lukić 53'; De Silvestri 80'	Report	Immobile 66'; Capanni (yellow card) 83'	Stadium: Stadio Olimpico Grande Torino; Attendance: 24,428; Referee: Rosario Abisso

=== Coppa Italia ===
12 January 2019 Round of 16	Lazio	4–1	Novara	Rome
15:00 CET (UTC+01:00)	Luis Alberto 12'; Immobile 20', 35'; Milinković-Savić 45+3'	Report	Eusepi 49' (pen.)	Stadium: Stadio Olimpico; Attendance: 15,604; Referee: Eugenio Abbattista

31 January 2019 Quarter-finals	Internazionale	1–1 (a.e.t.) (3–4 p)	Lazio	Milan
21:00 CET (UTC+01:00)	Gagliardini (yellow card) 44'; Vecino (yellow card) 82'; Brozović (yellow card) 110'; Asamoah (yellow card) 118'; Icardi 120+5' (pen.)	Report	Wallace (yellow card) 68'; Radu (yellow card) 73', (red card) 120+4'; Marušić (yellow card) 86'; Milinković-Savić (yellow card) 87'; Lucas (yellow card) 96'; Immobile 108', (yellow card) 109'	Stadium: San Siro; Attendance: 23,408; Referee: Rosario Abisso
	Penalties
	Brozović (penalty scored); Martínez (penalty missed); Icardi (penalty scored); Cédric (penalty scored); Nainggolan (penalty missed)		(penalty scored) Immobile; (penalty missed) Durmisi; (penalty scored) Parolo; (penalty scored) Acerbi; (penalty scored) Lucas

26 February 2019 Semi-finals; First leg	Lazio	0–0	Milan	Rome
21:00 CET (UTC+01:00)	Parolo (yellow card) 35'; Patric (yellow card) 78'	Report	Romagnoli (yellow card) 44'; Calabria (yellow card) 78'; G. Donnarumma (yellow card) 80'	Stadium: Stadio Olimpico; Attendance: 31,235; Referee: Daniele Orsato

24 April 2019 Semi-finals; Second leg	Milan	0–1 (0–1 agg.)	Lazio	Milan
20:45 CEST (UTC+02:00)	Musacchio (yellow card) 70'; Bakayoko (yellow card) 79'	Report	Luiz Felipe (yellow card) 37'; Correa 58'; Caicedo (yellow card) 78'	Stadium: San Siro; Attendance: 61,045; Referee: Paolo Mazzoleni

15 May 2019 Final	Atalanta	0–2	Lazio	Rome
20:45 CEST (UTC+02:00)	Masiello (yellow card) 37'; Zapata (yellow card) 41'; Freuler (yellow card) 81'	Report	Bastos (yellow card) 24'; Lulić (yellow card) 39'; Lucas (yellow card) 57'; Milinković-Savić 82'; Marušić (yellow card) 87'; Correa 90'	Stadium: Stadio Olimpico; Attendance: 57,059; Referee: Luca Banti

=== UEFA Europa League ===
==== Group stage ====
Pos	Team	Pld	W	D	L	GF	GA	GD	Pts	Qualification	FRA	LAZ	APL	MAR
1	(Germany) Eintracht Frankfurt	6	6	0	0	17	5	+12	18	Advance to knockout phase	—	4–1	2–0	4–0
2	(Italy) Lazio	6	3	0	3	9	11	−2	9	Advance to knockout phase	1–2	—	2–1	2–1
3	(Cyprus) Apollon Limassol	6	2	1	3	10	10	0	7		2–3	2–0	—	2–2
4	(France) Marseille	6	0	1	5	6	16	−10	1		1–2	1–3	1–3	—

Source: UEFA
Rules for classification: Group stage tiebreakers

20 September 2018 1	Lazio (Italy)	2–1	(Cyprus) Apollon Limassol	Rome, Italy
18:55 CEST (UTC+02:00)	Luis Alberto 14'; Badelj (yellow card) 58'; Milinković-Savić (yellow card) 72'; Lucas (yellow card) 81'; Immobile 84' (pen.)	Report	Yuste (yellow card) 21'; Zelaya 87'	Stadium: Stadio Olimpico; Attendance: 11,898; Referee: Aliyar Aghayev (Azerbaijan)

4 October 2018 2	Eintracht Frankfurt (Germany)	4–1	(Italy) Lazio	Frankfurt, Germany
21:00 CEST (UTC+02:00)	Da Costa 4', 90+4'; De Guzmán (yellow card) 22'; Trapp (yellow card) 23'; Kostić 28', (yellow card) 73'; Russ (yellow card) 45+1'; Jović 52'	Report	Parolo 23'; Basta (yellow card) 36' (yellow-red card) 45+3'; Correa (red card) 59'; Immobile (yellow card) 81'	Stadium: Waldstadion; Attendance: 47,000; Referee: Serdar Gözübüyük (Netherlands)

25 October 2018 3	Marseille (France)	1–3	(Italy) Lazio	Marseille, France
21:00 CEST (UTC+02:00)	Sakai (yellow card) 44'; Strootman (yellow card) 45+1'; Payet (yellow card) 68', (goal) 86'	Report	Wallace 10'; Radu (yellow card) 30'; Lulić (yellow card) 33'; Caicedo 59'; Parolo (yellow card) 74'; Marušić 90'	Stadium: Stade Vélodrome; Attendance: 31,930; Referee: Jesús Gil Manzano (Spain)

8 November 2018 4	Lazio (Italy)	2–1	(France) Marseille	Rome, Italy
18:55 CET (UTC+01:00)	Wallace (yellow card) 27'; Parolo 45+1'; Correa 55'; Milinković-Savić (yellow card) 83'	Report	Ocampos (yellow card) 22'; Thauvin (yellow card) 39', (goal) 60'; Rami (yellow card) 52'; N'Jie (yellow card) 87'; Strootman (yellow card) 88'	Stadium: Stadio Olimpico; Attendance: 14,705; Referee: Vladislav Bezborodov (Russia)

29 November 2018 5	Apollon Limassol (Cyprus)	2–0	(Italy) Lazio	Nicosia, Cyprus
21:00 CET (UTC+01:00)	Faupala 31'; Roberge (yellow card) 49'; Maglica (yellow card) 75'; Marković 82', (yellow card) 87'	Report	Murgia (yellow card) 19'; Luiz Felipe (yellow card) 74'	Stadium: GSP Stadium; Attendance: 1,131; Referee: Roi Reinshreiber (Israel)

13 December 2018 6	Lazio (Italy)	1–2	(Germany) Eintracht Frankfurt	Rome, Italy
18:55 CET (UTC+01:00)	Luis Alberto (yellow card) 51'; Correa 56'; Acerbi (yellow card) 58'; Cataldi (yellow card) 88'	Report	Gaćinović 65'; Haller 71'; Falette (yellow card) 76'; Stendera (yellow card) 90'	Stadium: Stadio Olimpico; Attendance: 18,252; Referee: Halil Umut Meler (Turkey)

==== Knockout phase ====
===== Round of 32 =====
14 February 2019 First leg	Lazio (Italy)	0–1	(Spain) Sevilla	Rome, Italy
18:55 CET (UTC+01:00)	Radu (yellow card) 31'; Correa (yellow card) 60'; Acerbi (yellow card) 90+3'	Report	Ben Yedder 22'; Banega (yellow card) 44'; Mercado (yellow card) 90+1'	Stadium: Stadio Olimpico; Attendance: 19,766; Referee: Slavko Vinčić (Slovenia)

20 February 2019 Second leg	Sevilla (Spain)	2–0 (3–0 agg.)	(Italy) Lazio	Seville, Spain
18:00 CET (UTC+01:00)	Vázquez (yellow card) 18' (yellow-red card) 60'; Ben Yedder 20'; Sarabia 78'	Report	Patric (yellow card) 21'; Caicedo (yellow card) 31'; Marušić (red card) 71'; Immobile (yellow card) 84'	Stadium: Ramón Sánchez Pizjuán; Attendance: 34,521; Referee: Anthony Taylor (England)
Note: The Sevilla v Lazio match was scheduled on 20 February in order to avoid a scheduling conflict with the Real Betis v Rennes match, in the same city.

== Statistics ==
=== Appearances and goals ===
No.	Pos	Nat	Player	Total		Serie A		Coppa Italia		Europa League	
No.	Pos	Nat	Player	Apps	Goals	Apps	Goals	Apps	Goals	Apps	Goals
Goalkeepers
1	GK	(Albania) ALB	Thomas Strakosha	42	0	35	0	3	0	4	0
23	GK	(Italy) ITA	Guido Guerrieri	1	0	1	0	0	0	0	0
24	GK	(Belgium) BEL	Silvio Proto	6	0	2	0	0	0	4	0
Defenders
3	DF	(Brazil) BRA	Luiz Felipe	23	1	15+2	1	1	0	4+1	0
4	DF	(Spain) ESP	Patric	17	0	12+3	0	1	0	1	0
5	DF	(Belgium) BEL	Jordan Lukaku	8	0	1+6	0	1	0	0	0
8	DF	(Serbia) SRB	Dušan Basta	2	0	0	0	0	0	2	0
13	DF	(Brazil) BRA	Wallace	20	1	14+2	0	1	0	3	1
14	DF	(Denmark) DEN	Riza Durmisi	19	0	2+8	0	0+2	0	5+2	0
15	DF	(Angola) ANG	Bastos	26	1	11+7	1	2+1	0	4+1	0
26	DF	(Romania) ROU	Ștefan Radu	32	0	28	0	1	0	3	0
33	DF	(Italy) ITA	Francesco Acerbi	48	3	37	3	3	0	8	0
58	DF	(Italy) ITA	Nicolò Armini	2	0	0+1	0	0	0	0+1	0
77	DF	(Montenegro) MNE	Adam Marušić	33	2	24+2	1	2+1	0	3+1	1
Midfielders
6	MF	(Brazil) BRA	Lucas Leiva	34	0	22+5	0	3	0	3+1	0
7	MF	(Kosovo) KOS	Valon Berisha	14	0	1+7	0	0+1	0	3+2	0
10	MF	(Spain) ESP	Luis Alberto	35	6	25+2	4	2+1	1	3+2	1
11	MF	(Argentina) ARG	Joaquín Correa	42	5	18+16	3	2	0	5+1	2
16	MF	(Italy) ITA	Marco Parolo	40	6	28+6	4	1+1	0	4	2
19	MF	(Bosnia and Herzegovina) BIH	Senad Lulić	44	4	34+1	4	2	0	3+4	0
21	MF	(Serbia) SRB	Sergej Milinković-Savić	38	6	29+1	5	3	1	4+1	0
25	MF	(Croatia) CRO	Milan Badelj	25	1	14+9	1	0	0	2	0
27	MF	(Brazil) BRA	Rômulo	12	0	9+1	0	1	0	0+1	0
32	MF	(Italy) ITA	Danilo Cataldi	18	2	4+8	2	0	0	4+2	0
66	MF	(Portugal) POR	Bruno Jordão	3	0	1+2	0	0	0	0	0
Forwards
17	FW	(Italy) ITA	Ciro Immobile	44	19	31+5	15	3	3	4+1	1
20	FW	(Ecuador) ECU	Felipe Caicedo	36	9	17+11	8	1+2	0	5	1
30	FW	(Portugal) POR	Pedro Neto	5	0	0+4	0	0+1	0	0	0
Players transferred out during the season
9	FW	(Italy) ITA	Alessandro Rossi	2	0	0	0	0	0	0+2	0
22	DF	(Uruguay) URU	Martín Cáceres	8	0	3+1	0	0	0	4	0
87	FW	(Italy) ITA	Cristiano Lombardi	0	0	0	0	0	0	0	0
96	MF	(Italy) ITA	Alessandro Murgia	4	0	0+1	0	0	0	3	0

Last updated: 26 May 2019
Source: Competitions

=== Goalscorers ===
As of 26 May 2019

Rank	No.	Pos	Nat	Name	Serie A	Coppa Italia	UEFA EL	Total
1	17	FW	(Italy)	Ciro Immobile	15	3	1	19
2	20	FW	(Ecuador)	Felipe Caicedo	8	0	1	9
2	11	MF	(Argentina)	Joaquín Correa	5	2	2	9
4	21	MF	(Serbia)	Sergej Milinković-Savić	5	2	0	7
5	10	MF	(Spain)	Luis Alberto	4	1	1	6
5	16	MF	(Italy)	Marco Parolo	4	0	2	6
7	19	MF	(Bosnia and Herzegovina)	Senad Lulić	4	0	0	4
8	33	DF	(Italy)	Francesco Acerbi	3	0	0	3
9	32	MF	(Italy)	Danilo Cataldi	2	0	0	2
9	77	DF	(Montenegro)	Adam Marušić	1	0	1	2
11	3	DF	(Brazil)	Luiz Felipe	1	0	0	1
11	25	MF	(Croatia)	Milan Badelj	1	0	0	1
11	13	DF	(Brazil)	Wallace	0	0	1	1
Own goal					1	0	0	1
Totals					56	8	9	73

Last updated: 26 May 2019

=== Clean sheets ===
Rank	No.	Pos	Nat	Name	Serie A	Coppa Italia	UEFA EL	Total
1	1	GK	(Albania)	Thomas Strakosha	5	0	0	5
Totals					5	0	0	5

Last updated: 20 January 2019

=== Disciplinary record ===
No.	Pos	Nat	Name	Serie A			Coppa Italia			UEFA EL			Total		
No.	Pos	Nat	Name	Booked	(yellow card) (yellow-red card)	Sent off (straight red)	Booked	(yellow card) (yellow-red card)	Sent off (straight red)	Booked	(yellow card) (yellow-red card)	Sent off (straight red)	Booked	(yellow card) (yellow-red card)	Sent off (straight red)
1	GK	(Albania)	Thomas Strakosha	2	0	0	0	0	0	0	0	0	2	0	0
3	DF	(Brazil)	Luiz Felipe	2	0	0	0	0	0	1	0	0	3	0	0
5	DF	(Belgium)	Jordan Lukaku	1	0	0	0	0	0	0	0	0	1	0	0
8	DF	(Serbia)	Dušan Basta	0	0	0	0	0	0	0	1	0	0	1	0
13	DF	(Brazil)	Wallace	2	0	0	0	0	0	1	0	0	3	0	0
14	DF	(Denmark)	Riza Durmisi	2	0	0	0	0	0	0	0	0	2	0	0
15	DF	(Angola)	Bastos	2	0	0	0	0	0	0	0	0	2	0	0
26	DF	(Romania)	Ștefan Radu	3	0	0	0	0	0	1	0	0	4	0	0
33	DF	(Italy)	Francesco Acerbi	2	1	0	0	0	0	1	0	0	3	1	0
77	DF	(Montenegro)	Adam Marušić	2	0	1	0	0	0	0	0	0	2	0	1
6	MF	(Brazil)	Lucas Leiva	2	0	0	0	0	0	1	0	0	3	0	0
10	MF	(Spain)	Luis Alberto	4	0	0	0	0	0	1	0	0	5	0	0
11	MF	(Argentina)	Joaquín Correa	3	0	0	0	0	0	0	0	1	3	0	1
16	MF	(Italy)	Marco Parolo	4	0	0	0	0	0	1	0	0	5	0	0
19	MF	(Bosnia and Herzegovina)	Senad Lulić	3	0	0	0	0	0	1	0	0	4	0	0
21	MF	(Serbia)	Sergej Milinković-Savić	4	0	0	0	0	0	2	0	0	6	0	0
25	MF	(Croatia)	Milan Badelj	3	0	0	0	0	0	1	0	0	4	0	0
32	MF	(Italy)	Danilo Cataldi	1	0	0	0	0	0	1	0	0	2	0	0
96	MF	(Italy)	Alessandro Murgia	0	0	0	0	0	0	1	0	0	1	0	0
17	FW	(Italy)	Ciro Immobile	4	0	0	0	0	0	1	0	0	5	0	0
20	FW	(Ecuador)	Felipe Caicedo	2	0	0	0	0	0	0	0	0	2	0	0
Totals				48	1	1	0	0	0	14	1	1	62	2	2

Last updated: 20 January 2019
