= Giorgio Spizzichino =

Italian footballer

Personal information
- Date of birth: 10 August 1999 (age 27)
- Place of birth: Rome, Italy
- Height: 1.75 m (5 ft 9 in)
- Position: Right back

Team information
- Current team: ASD Albula 1946

Youth career
- –2016: Tor Tre Teste
- 2016: → Lazio (loan)
- 2016–2018: Lazio

Senior career*
Years	Team	Apps	(Gls)
2017–2019	Lazio	1	(0)
2018–2019	→ Cuneo (loan)	15	(0)
2019–2021	Pro Patria	28	(2)
2022–2026	ASD LUISS		
2026–	ASD Albula 1946		
- * Club domestic league appearances and goals as of 8 October 2026

Giorgio Spizzichino (born 10 August 1999) is an Italian professional footballer who plays as a right back for ASD Albula 1946.

== Club career ==
=== Lazio ===
He made his professional debut in Serie A for Lazio on 28 May 2017 in a game against Crotone as a 79th-minute substitute for Wallace.

==== Loan to Cuneo ====
On 17 August 2018, Spizzichino was loaned to Serie C club Cuneo on a season-long loan deal. On 17 September he made his Serie C debut for Cuneo as a substitute replacing Giuseppe Borello in the 78th minute of a 1–0 away defeat against Pisa. One month later, on 17 October, Spizzichini played his first match as a starter for Cuneo, a 1–1 away draw against Robur Siena, he was replaced after 56 minutes for Alessandro Mattioli. On 24 February 2019, Spizzichino played his first entire match for the team in a 0–0 away draw against Arzachena. Spizzichino ended his season-long loan to Cuneo with 17 appearances.

=== Pro Patria ===
On 10 July 2019, Spizzichino joined to Serie C side Pro Patria on an undisclosed fee and he signed a 2-year contract. On 4 August he made his debut for the club in a 1–0 home win over Matelica in the first round of Coppa Italia, he played the entire match. Three weeks later, on 25 August he made his league debut for Pro Patria in a 2–1 home defeat against Monza, he played the entire match. Six days later, on 1 September, Spizzichino was sent-off with a red card in the 44th minute of a 1–1 away draw against AlbinoLeffe. On 13 October he scored his first professional goal and the winning goal of the match in the 23rd minute of a 1–0 away win over Olbia. On 10 January 2021, Spizzichino scored his second goal in the 20th minute of a 2–0 away win over Livorno.

== Career statistics ==
=== Club ===
As of 24 May 2021

Club	Season	League			Cup		Europe		Other		Total	
Club	Season	League	Apps	Goals	Apps	Goals	Apps	Goals	Apps	Goals	Apps	Goals
Lazio	2016–17	Serie A	1	0	0	0	0	0	—		1	0
Lazio	2017–18	Serie A	0	0	0	0	0	0	—		0	0
Cuneo (loan)	2018–19	Serie C	15	0	0	0	—		2 (Note: All appearance(s) in Serie C play-out.)	0	17	0
Pro Patria	2019–20	Serie C	12	1	2	0	—		—		14	1
Pro Patria	2020–21	Serie C	16	1	2	0	—		1 (Note: All appearance(s) in Serie C play-off.)	0	19	1
Career total			44	2	4	0	—		3	0	51	2
