= Alessandro Rossi (footballer) =

Italian footballer (born 1997)

Personal information
- Date of birth: 3 January 1997 (age 29)
- Place of birth: Viterbo, Italy
- Height: 1.83 m (6 ft 0 in)
- Position: Striker

Team information
- Current team: Nola
- Number: 10

Youth career
- 2011–2015: Lazio

Senior career*
Years	Team	Apps	(Gls)
2015–2024	Lazio	3	(0)
2017–2018	→ Salernitana (loan)	27	(2)
2019	→ Venezia (loan)	9	(0)
2019	→ Juve Stabia (loan)	22	(1)
2020–2021	→ Viterbese (loan)	31	(5)
2022	→ Monopoli (loan)	11	(0)
2022–2023	→ Monterosi (loan)	8	(0)
2024	Monterosi	13	(1)
2024–2025	Legnago	15	(1)
2025	→ Guidonia (loan)	13	(4)
2025	Guidonia	0	(0)
2025–	Nola	4	(0)

International career^{‡}
2017	Italy U20	4	(0)
- * Club domestic league appearances and goals as of 11 January 2026 ‡ National team caps and goals as of 14 November 2017

Alessandro Rossi (born 3 January 1997) is an Italian footballer who plays as a striker for Serie D club Nola.

== Club career ==
=== Lazio ===
Product of Lazio's youth system, he made his Serie A debut for the senior team on 8 January 2017, as a substitute replacing Lucas Biglia in the 82nd minute of a 1–0 home win against Crotone at the Stadio Olimpico.

==== Loan to Salernitana ====
On 18 August 2017, Rossi was signed by Serie B club Salernitana on a season-long loan deal. On 26 August he made his Serie B debut for Salernitana as a substitute replacing Riccardo Bocalon in the 88th minute of a 0–0 away draw against Venezia. On 9 September, Rossi played his first match as a starter in a 1–0 away defeat against Carpi, he was replaced by Alejandro Rodriguez in the 46th minute. On 24 October he played his first entire match for Salernitana, a 3–2 away win over Novara. On 4 November, Rossi scored his first professional goal in the 14th minute and he scored again in the 48th minute of a 2–2 home draw against Bari. Rossi ended his loan to Salernitana with 27 appearances, 2 goals and 3 assists.

==== Loan to Venezia ====
On 16 January 2019, Rossi joined on loan to Serie B club Venezia until 30 June 2019. Five days later, on 21 January he made his debut for Venezia in a 1–1 away draw against Spezia, he was replaced by Cristiano Lombardi in the 51st minute.

==== Loan to Juve Stabia ====
On 19 July 2019, Rossi joined Serie B club Juve Stabia on loan until 30 June 2020.

==== Loan to Viterbese ====
On 19 August 2020, Rossi moved on loan to Serie C club Viterbese.

==== Loan to Monopoli ====
On 4 January 2022, he joined Monopoli in Serie C on loan until the end of the season. Monopoli held an option to purchase his rights at the end of the loan (with a counter-option for Lazio to retain the rights) and an option to extend the loan further.

==== Loan to Monterosi ====
On 14 August 2022, Rossi was loaned by Monterosi.

=== Legnago ===
On 7 July 2024, Rossi signed with Legnago.

== International career ==
Rossi was a youth international for italy.

== Career statistics ==
=== Club ===
As of match played 21 May 2022

Club	Season	League			Cup		Europe		Other		Total	
Club	Season	Division	Apps	Goals	Apps	Goals	Apps	Goals	Apps	Goals	Apps	Goals
Lazio	2016–17	Serie A	3	0	0	0	—		—		3	0
Lazio	2018–19	Serie A	0	0	0	0	2	0	—		2	0
Lazio	Total		3	0	0	0	2	0	—		5	0
Salernitana (loan)	2017–18	Serie B	27	2	0	0	—		—		27	2
Venezia (loan)	2018–19	Serie B	9	0	—		—		2 (Note: Appearance(s) in Relegation Playoffs)	0	11	0
Juve Stabia (loan)	2019–20	Serie B	22	1	1	0	—		—		23	1
Viterbese (loan)	2020–21	Serie C	31	5	—		—		—		31	5
Monopoli (loan)	2021–22	Serie C	11	0	—		—		5 (Note: Appearance(s) in Promotion Playoffs)	0	16	0
Career total			103	8	1	0	2	0	7	0	113	8

== Honours ==
=== Club ===
Lazio Primavera

- Coppa Italia Primavera: 2014–15
- Supercoppa Primavera: 2015
