= Crecco =

Crecco is an Italian surname. Notable people with the surname include:

- Luca Crecco (born 1995), Italian footballer
- Marion Crecco (1930–2015), American politician
