= Sergej Milinković-Savić =

Serbian footballer (born 1995)

Sergej Milinković-Savić Сергеј Милинковић-Савић
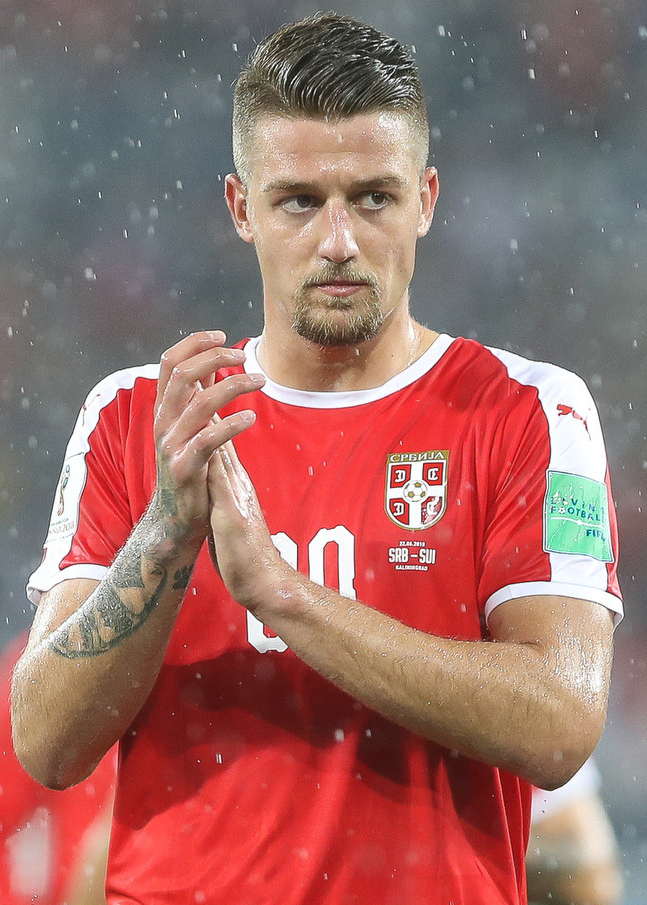
- Milinković-Savić with Serbia at the 2018 FIFA World Cup

Personal information
- Full name: Sergej Milinković-Savić
- Date of birth: 27 February 1995 (age 31)
- Place of birth: Lleida, Catalonia, Spain
- Height: 1.92 m (6 ft 4 in)
- Position: Midfielder

Team information
- Current team: Al Hilal
- Number: 22

Youth career
- 1999–2001: Sporting CP
- 2002–2006: Grazer AK
- 2006–2013: Vojvodina

Senior career*
Years	Team	Apps	(Gls)
2013–2014	Vojvodina	13	(3)
2014–2015	Genk	24	(5)
2015–2023	Lazio	267	(57)
2023–	Al Hilal	103	(36)

International career^{‡}
2017–	Serbia	60	(9)
Medal record
Men's football
Representing Serbia
FIFA U-20 World Cup
Winner	2015 New Zealand
UEFA U-19 Championship
Winner	2013 Lithuania
- * Club domestic league appearances and goals as of 21:21, 31 October 2026 (UTC) ‡ National team caps and goals as of 16 November 2026

Sergej Milinković-Savić (Serbian Cyrillic: Сергеј Милинковић-Савић, pronounced [serɡêj milǐːŋkoʋitɕ sǎːʋitɕ]; born 27 February 1995), also known mononymously as Sergej, is a Serbian professional footballer who plays as a midfielder for Saudi Pro League club Al Hilal and the Serbia national team.

Milinković-Savić began his professional career at Serbian club Vojvodina and helped them win the Serbian Cup in the 2013–14 season. He joined Belgian club Genk in June 2014, where he played 24 games before transferring to Italian club Lazio one year later. He made over 300 appearances for Lazio and won the Coppa Italia once and the Supercoppa Italiana twice. He was named in the Serie A Team of the Year in the 2017–18 season and won the league's Best Midfielder award in the 2018–19 season.

Milinković-Savić played youth international football for Serbia at under-19, under-20 and under-21 levels. He was a member of the Serbian team that won the 2015 FIFA U-20 World Cup and received the tournament's Bronze Ball award for his performances. He made his senior international debut in 2017, and represented Serbia at the 2018 and 2022 FIFA World Cups, as well as at UEFA Euro 2024.

== Early life ==
Milinković-Savić was born into a sporting family in Lleida, Catalonia, Spain, where his father Nikola Milinković played football professionally at the time. His mother, Milana Savić, was a professional basketball player. He first started training with Sporting CP, while his father was playing in Portugal. He then spent a few years at Grazer AK in Austria before moving to his Serbia where he broke through as a footballer.

Milinković-Savić is the older brother of Vanja Milinković-Savić, a fellow footballer who plays as a goalkeeper.

== Club career ==
=== Vojvodina ===
Milinković-Savić came through the youth academy of Vojvodina. He was one of the midfielders who emerged from the youth squad that won two consecutive national youth championship titles, alongside Mijat Gaćinović and Nebojša Kosović. Consequently, Milinković-Savić signed his first professional contract with the club on 26 December 2012, penning a three-year deal.

Milinković-Savić made his senior debut in a 3–0 away loss to Jagodina on 23 November 2013. He scored his first goal in a 1–1 away draw with Spartak Subotica on 9 March 2014. In total, Milinković-Savić made 13 league appearances and scored three goals in the 2013–14 season. He also helped Vojvodina win the 2013–14 Serbian Cup in the club's centennial year.

=== Genk ===
In June 2014, Milinković-Savić signed a five-year contract with Belgian club Genk and was given the number 20 shirt. He made his competitive debut for the club in a 1–1 home league draw with Cercle Brugge on 2 August 2014. Milinković-Savić scored his first goal for Genk in a 1–1 away league draw against Lokeren on 18 January 2015. He scored a total of five league goals in 24 appearances during the 2014–15 season.

=== Lazio ===
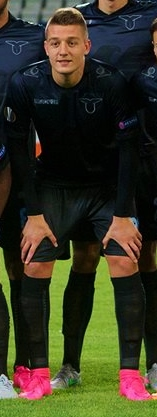
Milinković-Savić lining up for Lazio in 2015

On 31 July 2015, it was announced that Milinković-Savić would join Italian club Lazio. He made his debut for the side in a 1–0 home win over Bayer Leverkusen in the first leg of the Champions League play-off round on 18 August 2015. Milinković-Savić scored his first goal for Lazio in a 1–1 Europa League draw with Dnipro Dnipropetrovsk on 17 September 2015. He scored his first Serie A goal in a 3–1 away win over Fiorentina on 9 January 2016. Throughout his debut season, Milinković-Savić made 35 appearances and scored three goals for Lazio in all competitions.

In his second season at Lazio, Milinković-Savić scored seven goals from 39 appearances (league and cup).

On 5 December 2021, Milinković-Savić became the highest-scoring midfielder in Lazio's history following his goal against Sampdoria. He beat previous holder Pavel Nedvěd, who had the record of 33 goals for over a decade.

=== Al Hilal ===
On 12 July 2023, Saudi club Al Hilal announced the signing of Milinković-Savić on a three-year deal, for a reported fee of €40 million.

== International career ==
=== Youth ===
Milinković-Savić represented Serbia at under-19, under-20 and under-21 levels. He played for Serbia at the 2013 UEFA Under-19 Championship, winning the gold medal. He played the full 90 minutes in four out of five games, including the final match of the competition against France that Serbia won 1–0. Subsequently, Milinković-Savić appeared at the 2014 UEFA Under-19 Championship, as the team was eliminated in the semi-final by Portugal after penalties. He missed Serbia's last spot-kick in the penalty shoot-out.

The following summer, Milinković-Savić was one of Serbia's most influential players at the 2015 FIFA U-20 World Cup, as the team won the tournament. He appeared in six out of seven games and scored one goal against Mali in the group stage. Due to his performances during the tournament, Milinković-Savić was awarded the Bronze Ball.

In the summer of 2017, Lazio prevented Milinković-Savić from playing at the 2017 UEFA European Under-21 Championship.

=== Senior ===
In October 2015, Milinković-Savić received his first call-up to the full squad by manager Radovan Ćurčić for Serbia's UEFA Euro 2016 qualifiers against Albania and Portugal. He remained an unused substitute in both games. In May 2016, Milinković-Savić was selected by newly appointed manager Slavoljub Muslin for friendly matches against Cyprus, Israel, and Russia. However, after failing to receive any playing time in the first two games, Milinković-Savić left the team in agreement with Muslin who said that some other players better fit into his tactical formations. On 30 October 2017, it was announced that Serbia caretaker manager Mladen Krstajić included Milinković-Savić in the squad for friendlies against China and South Korea. In June 2018, he was selected in the Serbian squad for the 2018 World Cup, playing all three group stage matches. Milinković-Savić scored his first two senior international goals on 8 October 2020, settling a 2–1 win over Norway in the semi-finals of the Euro 2020 qualifying play-off.

In November 2022, he was selected in Serbia's squad for the 2022 FIFA World Cup in Qatar. He played in all three group stage matches, against Brazil, Cameroon, and Switzerland. He scored a goal in a group stage match against Cameroon, on assist from Andrija Živković. Serbia finished fourth in the group.

Milinković-Savić was part of the Serbia squad for UEFA Euro 2024 and started the team's opening match of the tournament against England, playing the full 90 minutes of the 1–0 loss. He also played in group stage matches against Slovenia and Denmark. Serbia finished fourth in the group.

== Style of play ==
Sergej Milinković-Savic is a versatile central midfield player and is capable of playing in several roles, including as a trequartista, or in a holding role, although he is usually deployed as a central midfielder, in the mezzala role. His style of play has drawn comparisons to Zinedine Zidane and Yaya Touré, as he blends the traditional attacking movement, positional sense, and finishing ability of an attacking midfielder, with the height and physicality of a target man or defensive midfielder; as such, he also is effective in the air, and is capable of scoring goals with his head as well as either foot, by making late runs from behind into the penalty area, or striking from distance. He possesses good technique, tactical intelligence, vision, and passing ability, despite his limited pace, as well as tenacity and excellent defensive work-rate, which enables him to help out at both ends of the pitch, carry the ball, and start attacking plays after winning possession. He has been nicknamed ‘il Sergente’ (the Sergeant) by Lazio fans for his charisma, physical dominance and for the assonance with his name.

== Career statistics ==
=== Club ===
As of match played 1 November 2026

Appearances and goals by club, season and competition
Club	Season	League			National cup (Note: Includes Serbian Cup, Coppa Italia, King's Cup)		Continental		Other		Total	
Club	Season	Division	Apps	Goals	Apps	Goals	Apps	Goals	Apps	Goals	Apps	Goals
Vojvodina	2013–14	Serbian Superliga	13	3	3	1	0	0	—		16	4
Genk	2014–15	Belgian Pro League	24	5	0	0	—		—		24	5
Lazio	2015–16	Serie A	25	1	2	0	8 (Note: One appearance in UEFA Champions League, seven appearances and two goals in UEFA Europa League)	2	0	0	35	3
Lazio	2016–17	Serie A	34	4	5	3	—		—		39	7
Lazio	2017–18	Serie A	35	12	4	0	8 (Note: Appearances in UEFA Europa League)	2	1 (Note: Appearance in Supercoppa Italiana)	0	48	14
Lazio	2018–19	Serie A	31	5	5	2	5	0	0	0	41	7
Lazio	2019–20	Serie A	37	7	1	0	4	1	1	0	43	8
Lazio	2020–21	Serie A	32	8	2	0	7 (Note: Appearances in UEFA Champions League)	0	—		41	8
Lazio	2021–22	Serie A	37	11	2	0	8	0	—		47	11
Lazio	2022–23	Serie A	36	9	2	0	9 (Note: Six appearances and two goals in UEFA Europa League, three appearances in UEFA Europa Conference League)	2	—		47	11
Lazio	Total		267	57	23	5	49	7	2	0	341	69
Al Hilal	2023–24	Saudi Pro League	30	11	4	0	8 (Note: Appearances in AFC Champions League)	1	7 (Note: Five appearances and two goals in Arab Club Champions Cup, two appearances in Saudi Super Cup)	2	49	14
Al Hilal	2024–25	Saudi Pro League	31	12	3	0	11	4	7 (Note: Two appearances and one goal in Saudi Super Cup, five appearances in FIFA Club World Cup)	1	52	17
Al Hilal	2025–26	Saudi Pro League	32	8	3	0	7	4	—		42	12
Al Hilal	2026–27	Saudi Pro League	10	5	1	0	2	1	—		13	7
Al Hilal	Total		103	36	11	0	28	10	14	3	156	49
Career total			407	101	37	6	77	17	16	3	537	127

=== International ===
As of match played 16 November 2026

Appearances and goals by national team and year
National team	Year	Apps	Goals
Serbia	2017	2	0
Serbia	2018	8	0
Serbia	2019	5	0
Serbia	2020	5	3
Serbia	2021	8	2
Serbia	2022	11	2
Serbia	2023	8	0
Serbia	2024	7	2
Serbia	2025	0	0
Serbia	2026	6	0
Total		60	9

As of match played 20 June 2024
Scores and results list Serbia's goal tally first, score column indicates score after each Milinković-Savić goal.

List of international goals scored by Sergej Milinković-Savić
No.	Date	Venue	Cap	Opponent	Score	Result	Competition
1	8 October 2020	Ullevaal Stadion, Oslo, Norway	17	Norway	1–0	2–1	UEFA Euro 2020 qualifying
2	8 October 2020	Ullevaal Stadion, Oslo, Norway	17	Norway	2–1	2–1	UEFA Euro 2020 qualifying
3	14 October 2020	Türk Telekom Stadium, Istanbul, Turkey	18	Turkey	1–0	2–2	2020–21 UEFA Nations League B
4	7 September 2021	Aviva Stadium, Dublin, Republic of Ireland	24	Republic of Ireland	1–0	1–1	2022 FIFA World Cup qualification
5	11 November 2021	Rajko Mitić Stadium, Belgrade, Serbia	27	Qatar	4–0	4–0	Friendly
6	5 June 2022	Rajko Mitić Stadium, Belgrade, Serbia	32	Slovenia	2–1	4–1	2022–23 UEFA Nations League B
7	28 November 2022	Al Janoub Stadium, Al Wakrah, Qatar	38	Cameroon	2–1	3–3	2022 FIFA World Cup
8	25 March 2024	AEK Arena, Larnaca, Cyprus	49	Cyprus	1–0	1–0	Friendly
9	8 June 2024	Friends Arena, Solna, Sweden	51	Sweden	1–0	3–0	Friendly

== Honours ==
Vojvodina

- Serbian Cup: 2013–14

Lazio

- Coppa Italia: 2018–19
- Supercoppa Italiana: 2017, 2019

Al-Hilal

- Saudi Pro League: 2023–24
- King's Cup: 2023–24, 2025–26
- Saudi Super Cup: 2023, 2024

Serbia U19

- UEFA European Under-19 Championship: 2013

Serbia U20

- FIFA U-20 World Cup: 2015

Individual

- FIFA U-20 World Cup Bronze Ball: 2015
- Serie A Team of the Year: 2017–18, 2021–22
- Serie A Best Midfielder: 2018–19
- Serie A Player of the Month: December 2019, January 2021
- Lazio Player of the Season: 2020–21, 2021–22
- Arab Club Champions Cup Player of the Tournament: 2023
- Saudi Pro League Player of the Month: October 2023, November 2024
- Saudi Pro League Team of the Season: 2023–24, 2024–25

== See also ==
- List of SS Lazio players
