= Jordan Lukaku =

Belgian footballer (born 1994)

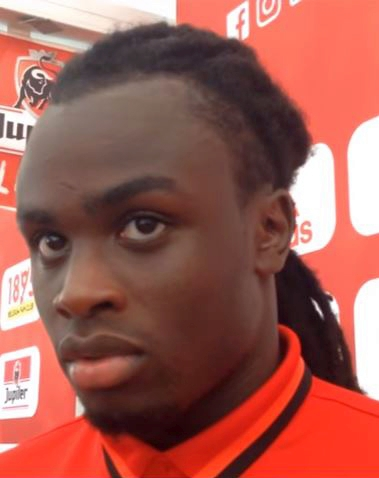
- Lukaku at Oostende in 2016

Personal information
- Full name: Jordan Zacharie Lukaku Menama Mokelenge
- Date of birth: 25 July 1994 (age 32)
- Place of birth: Antwerp, Belgium
- Height: 1.77 m (5 ft 10 in)
- Position: Left-back

Youth career
- 2000–2003: KFC Wintam
- 2003–2004: Boom FC
- 2004–2006: Lierse
- 2006–2011: Anderlecht

Senior career*
Years	Team	Apps	(Gls)
2011–2013	Anderlecht	8	(0)
2013–2016	Oostende	79	(3)
2016–2022	Lazio	66	(1)
2020–2021	→ Antwerp (loan)	22	(0)
2022	→ Vicenza (loan)	7	(0)
2022–2023	Ponferradina	7	(0)
2023–2024	Adanaspor	14	(0)

International career
2009	Belgium U15	2	(0)
2010	Belgium U16	6	(0)
2011	Belgium U18	3	(0)
2011–2012	Belgium U19	7	(0)
2013–2015	Belgium U21	12	(0)
2015–2017	Belgium	8	(0)
- * Club domestic league appearances and goals as of 19 October 2024

Jordan Zacharie Lukaku Menama Mokelenge (born 25 July 1994) is a Belgian professional footballer who plays as a left-back. He most recently played for Süper Lig team Adanaspor.

Starting his professional career at Anderlecht, he made nine appearances for the first team, before joining Oostende in 2013, where he became a regular player. He was signed by Lazio in 2016, making 85 total appearances and being loaned to Antwerp and Vicenza before signing for Ponferradina.

Lukaku made his senior international debut for Belgium in 2015 and totalled eight caps over the next two years. He was part of their squad at UEFA Euro 2016.

== Club career ==
=== Anderlecht ===
Despite interests from Premier League side Arsenal, Lukaku signed his first professional contract with the club, keeping him until 2013.

Having previously trained with the first team in the 2010–11 season, along with his brother (who then left the club for Chelsea at the time), Lukaku was first included in a senior matchday squad on 1 December 2011, remaining an unused substitute in Anderlecht's 2–1 win at AEK Athens in the group stage of that season's UEFA Europa League. His debut came the following 21 March against Zulte Waregem, which saw Anderlecht win 2–1; Lukaku later said after the match: "it was the best day of his life". He totalled six appearances as his team won the league that season, but did not play at all as they retained the title the following campaign, only making the bench twice. During the season, he missed out the start of the season, due to suffering a stress fracture. As he struggled in the first team, he was linked with a loan move to an unknown club in the Dutch Eredivisie, but rejected the move and was sent to the reserve team instead.

On 21 July 2013, Lukaku came on as an 87th-minute substitute for Matías Suárez as Anderlecht won the 2013 Belgian Super Cup 1–0 against Genk at the Constant Vanden Stock Stadium. After appearing two matches at the start of the season, he announced his desire to leave the club to get regular first team football.

=== Oostende ===
Soon after playing in the Belgian Super Cup, Lukaku left Anderlecht to join Oostende on loan until the end of the season. His debut was as a half-time substitute in a 1–0 loss against Lokeren on 31 August 2013. In a match against Genk on 23 November 2013, he set up one of the goals in a 4–0 win. His last appearance for the club came on 25 January 2014 against Waasland-Beveren; he suffered a pubalgia that kept him out of the season.

With his contract expiring at Anderlecht at the end of the season, Lukaku joined Oostende on a permanent basis, signing a four-year contract. His next game was on 1 August 2014, playing his former club, Anderlecht, in a 2–0 loss. Lukaku continued to be in a regular in the first team at Oostende despite being absence on two occasions, including his sending off against Gent on 25 January 2015. In his first permanent season at the club, Lukaku made 30 appearances in all competitions.

In the 2015–16 season, Lukaku set up one of the goals, in a 3–1 win over Mechelen in the opening game of the season, followed up by scoring his first goal for the club, in a 2–1 win over Westerlo, being named in the Team of the Week. He continued to be in the first team until he was absence from late-2015, due to injuries. He scored his second goal of the season on 31 January 2016, in a 3–3 draw against Mouscron. After returning from injury in early-May, he scored in a 2–1 win over Genk on 14 May 2016. Lukaku finished his second season with 34 appearances and three goals in all competitions.

=== Lazio ===
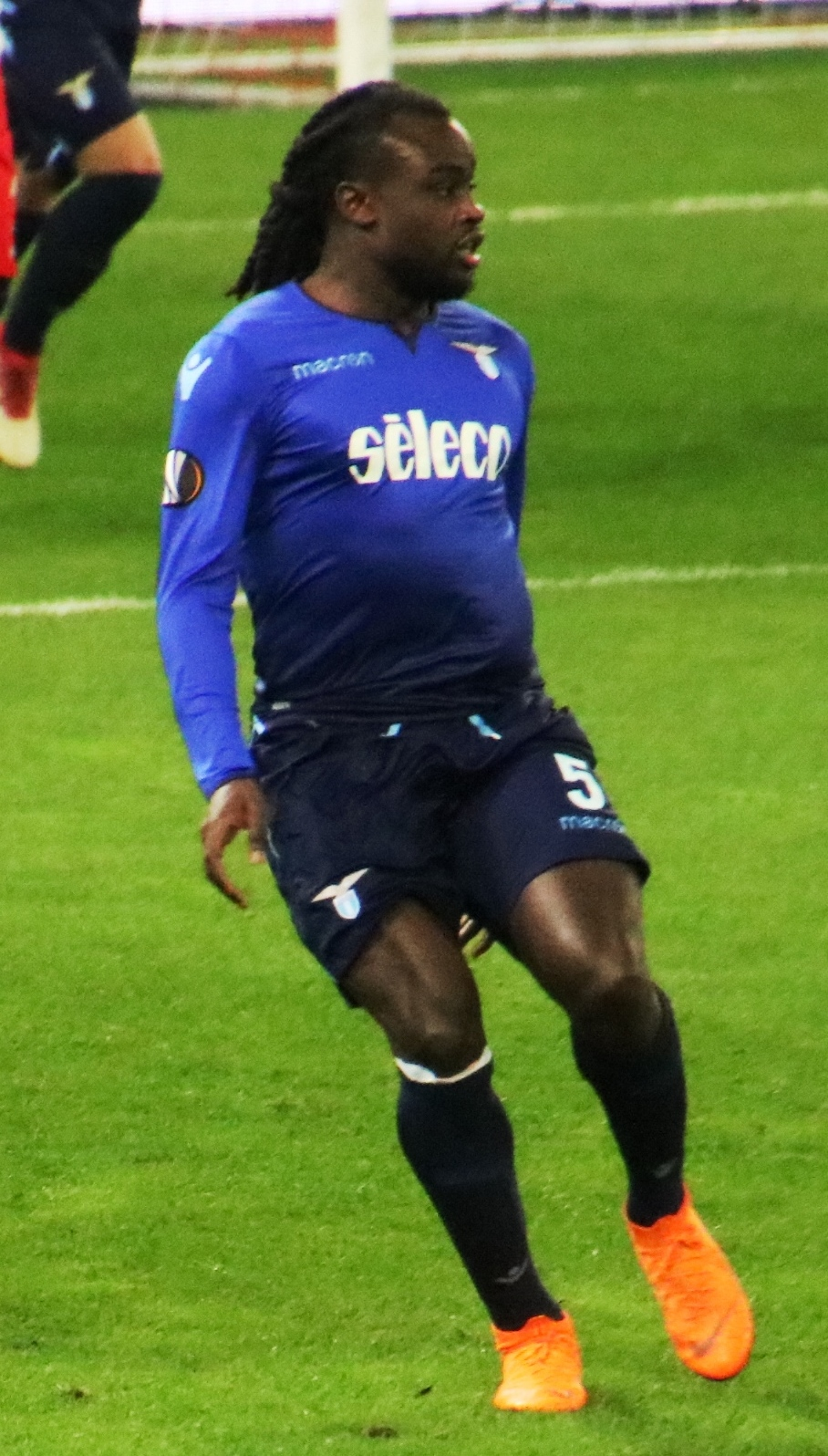
Lukaku with Lazio in 2018

With a hint from the club's president, stating that Lukaku could leave the club in the summer, it was announced on 22 July 2016, he signed with Italian club Lazio for €4 million plus a reported €1 million in performance-related bonuses. Upon joining the club, Lukaku was given a number six shirt and was presented to the club several days later.

Lukaku made his Lazio debut, where he made his first start and played the whole game, in a 4–3 win over Atalanta in the opening game of the season. He continued to remain in the first team until he suffered an injury during an international break that kept him out for a month. It was not until on 27 November 2016 when he made his return from injury, coming on as a substitute in the second half, in a 1–0 win over Palermo.

In the 2017 Supercoppa Italiana, Lukaku came on as a late substitute in a 3–2 win over Juventus at the Stadio Olimpico. On 23 December that year, he scored his first goal for the club, finishing from a Ciro Immobile pass to open a 4–0 home win over Crotone.

Injury problems during the 2018–19 season meant Lukaku only started three games in all competitions before a loan deal until the end of the season was agreed with English club Newcastle United on 24 January. However, the deal was called off the following day after the Belgian reportedly failed a medical.

On 5 October 2020, Lukaku returned to the Belgian top flight with Royal Antwerp F.C. on a one-year loan. On 12 January 2022, he was loaned out to Serie B club Vicenza until the end of the season.

=== Ponferradina ===
On 26 August 2022, free agent Lukaku signed a contract with Spanish Segunda División side SD Ponferradina. In February 2023, he left the club.

=== Adanaspor ===
On 20 August 2023, Lukaku joined Turkish club Adanaspor on a two-year contract. His contract was terminated on 23 October 2024.

== International career ==
After previously representing Belgium at under-15, under-16, under-18 and under-19 levels, Lukaku rejected a chance to play for DR Congo in 2011, in favour of playing for Belgium instead.

Following his impressive performance at Oostende, Lukaku was called by the senior team for the first team. On 10 October 2015, Lukaku made his senior debut for the national team in a 4–1 win in a Euro 2016 qualification match against Andorra; the victory qualified his team to the finals. In his next game on the following 29 March, he replaced Guillaume Gillet in the 59th minute of a friendly away to Portugal in Leiria, and sent in the cross that was headed in by his brother as consolation in a 2–1 loss.

After being included for the a 24-man preliminary squad, Lukaku was selected for Euro 2016 squad, wearing shirt number 21. He made one appearance in the tournament, playing 75 minutes in place of the injured Jan Vertonghen in Belgium's 3–1 quarterfinal defeat to Wales.

In May 2018, he was named in Belgium's preliminary squad for the 2018 World Cup in Russia. However, he did not make the final 23.

== Style of play ==
Regarded as a promising player in his youth, Lukaku is a powerful left-footed attacking full-back. He primarily plays as a left-back, but has played in areas along the left side of the pitch as a wing-back, as a wide midfielder, or even as a winger in an attacking trident. He is particularly known for having a notable pace, as well as a high quality technique, crossing ability, physical strength, and stamina, which enables him to cover the flank effectively, get forward, exploit spaces, take on opponents, retain possession, and create chances for his teammates. He has drawn criticism at times from pundits over his tactical sense and the defensive aspect of this game, which have been cited as areas which have room for improvement. He has also faced injuries which have limited his playing time.

== Personal life ==
Lukaku was born in Antwerp. His father is Roger Lukaku, who played professional football and was capped at international level by Zaire. He has an older brother, Romelu Lukaku, who also progressed through the youth academy at Anderlecht. Their cousin Boli Bolingoli-Mbombo plays for Standard Liège.

While at the youth academy at Anderlecht, Jordan, along with Romelu, were picked up by their father and taken to training every morning. Unlike his older brother, Jordan grew up supporting Arsenal. Around 2012, Jordan became a victim of fake profiling. It came after he was involved in a controversial situation, prompting angry responses from social media.

In December 2014, Jordan Lukaku was charged with speeding and had his driving license revoked for fifteen days, as well as, being fined €600. The following month, his closest friend, Junior Malanda, was killed in a car crash. Three months later, he was charged with the same offence and was banned from driving for a year. He was given a final warning and told that if he did it again, he would be jailed. The following year, he was charged with the same offence for the third time and was banned from driving for fifteen months.

== Career statistics ==
=== Club ===
As of match played 17 March 2024

Club	Season	League			National cup (Note: Includes Belgian Cup, Coppa Italia, Copa del Rey, Turkish Cup)		Europe		Other		Total	
Club	Season	Division	Apps	Goals	Apps	Goals	Apps	Goals	Apps	Goals	Apps	Goals
Anderlecht	2011–12	Belgian Pro League	6	0	0	0	0	0	0	0	6	0
Anderlecht	2012–13	Belgian Pro League	0	0	0	0	0	0	0	0	0	0
Anderlecht	2013–14	Belgian Pro League	2	0	0	0	0	0	1 (Note: Appearance in Belgian Super Cup)	0	3	0
Anderlecht	Total		8	0	0	0	0	0	1	0	9	0
Oostende	2013–14	Belgian Pro League	16	0	3	0	—		—		19	0
Oostende	2014–15	Belgian Pro League	29	0	1	0	—		—		30	0
Oostende	2015–16	Belgian Pro League	34	3	0	0	—		—		34	3
Oostende	Total		79	3	4	0	—		—		83	3
Lazio	2016–17	Serie A	16	0	4	0	—		—		20	0
Lazio	2017–18	Serie A	30	1	4	0	9 (Note: Appearances in UEFA Europa League)	0	1 (Note: Appearance in Supercoppa Italiana)	0	44	1
Lazio	2018–19	Serie A	7	0	1	0	0	0	—		8	0
Lazio	2019–20	Serie A	13	0	0	0	0	0	0	0	13	0
Lazio	2020–21	Serie A	0	0	0	0	0	0	—		0	0
Lazio	Total		66	1	9	0	9	0	1	0	85	1
Royal Antwerp (loan)	2020–21	Belgian Pro League	22	0	2	0	5	0	—		29	0
Vicenza (loan)	2021–22	Serie B	9	0	0	0	—		—		9	0
Ponferradina	2022–23	Segunda División	7	0	1	0	—		—		8	0
Adanaspor	2023–24	TFF First League	12	0	2	0	—		—		14	0
Career total			204	4	18	0	14	0	2	0	235	4

=== International ===
As of 14 November 2017

Belgium
Year	Apps	Goals
2015	1	0
2016	6	0
2017	1	0
Total	8	0

== Honours ==
Anderlecht

- Belgian Super Cup: 2013

Lazio

- Coppa Italia: 2018–19
- Supercoppa Italiana: 2017
