= Patric (Spanish footballer) =

Spanish footballer (born 1993)

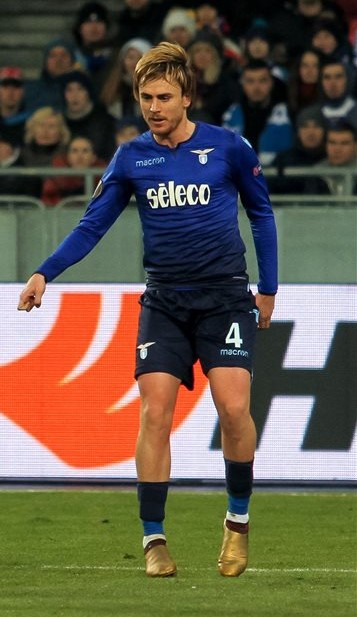
- Patric with Lazio in 2018

Personal information
- Full name: Patricio Gabarrón Gil
- Date of birth: 17 April 1993 (age 33)
- Place of birth: Mula, Spain
- Height: 1.84 m (6 ft 0 in)
- Positions: Defender; defensive midfielder

Team information
- Current team: Al-Ittifaq

Youth career
- Muleño
- 1999–2006: Murcia
- 2006–2008: Villarreal
- 2008–2012: Barcelona

Senior career*
Years	Team	Apps	(Gls)
2012–2015	Barcelona B	87	(4)
2013	Barcelona	0	(0)
2015–2026	Lazio	186	(4)
2026–	Al-Ittifaq	0	(0)
- * Club domestic league appearances and goals as of 19 September 2026

Patricio Gabarrón Gil (born 17 April 1993), known as Patric, is a Spanish professional footballer who plays for UAE First Division League club Al-Ittifaq. Mainly a central defender, he can also operate as a right-back and a defensive midfielder.

He began his professional career at Barcelona, where he was mainly a reserve and played one first-team match in the UEFA Champions League. He joined Lazio in 2015 and made 244 total appearances over 11 Serie A seasons, winning the Coppa Italia in 2019.

== Club career ==
=== Barcelona ===
Born in Mula, Region of Murcia, Patric began playing at his hometown club Muleño CF – who received €10,300 compensation for their development – and played in the youth ranks at Real Murcia CF and Villarreal CF before joining FC Barcelona's academy at La Masia in 2008, aged 15. Originally a defensive midfielder, he was converted to right-back by the B side's coach Eusebio Sacristán, a former Barcelona player.

On 22 September 2012, Patric made his debut with the reserves, coming on as a second-half substitute for Gerard Deulofeu in a 3–0 Segunda División away win against Hércules CF. On 26 November of the following year he first appeared with the first team in competitive games, replacing Carles Puyol in the 2–1 loss at AFC Ajax in the group stage of the UEFA Champions League.

Patric scored his first goal as a professional on 28 February 2015, but in a 2–4 home defeat to RCD Mallorca. The season eventually ended in relegation.

=== Lazio ===
On 8 June 2015, Patric signed a four-year deal with Serie A club SS Lazio. He made his debut in the competition on 30 August, playing the second half of the 4–0 loss at AC ChievoVerona. After sitting on the bench as his team won the Coppa Italia against Atalanta BC in 2019, he scored his first goal for them in the last 16 of the following edition, opening a 4–0 home victory over US Cremonese.

On 7 July 2020, Patric received a red card for biting US Lecce player Giulio Donati in a 2–1 defeat, and was fined €10,000 and given a four-match ban by the Disciplinary Commission the following day. Nine days later, the ban was reduced to three matches and €20,000 on appeal.

Patric scored his first top-flight goal on 7 May 2022, in the 2–0 home win over UC Sampdoria. In July, he agreed to a new contract to last until 2027.

=== Al-Ittifaq ===
On 28 September 2026, Patric joined UAE First Division League side Al-Ittifaq FC.

== Career statistics ==
As of match played 13 May 2026

Appearances and goals by club, season and competition
Club	Season	League			National cup		Europe		Other		Total	
Club	Season	Division	Apps	Goals	Apps	Goals	Apps	Goals	Apps	Goals	Apps	Goals
Barcelona B
Barcelona B	2012–13	Segunda División	20	0	—						20	0
Barcelona B	2013–14	Segunda División	35	1	—						35	1
Barcelona B	2014–15	Segunda División	32	3	—						32	3
Barcelona B	Total		87	4	—						87	4
Barcelona	2013–14	La Liga	0	0	0	0	1 (Note: Appearance(s) in UEFA Champions League)	0	0	0	1	0
Lazio	2015–16	Serie A	9	0	0	0	0	0	0	0	9	0
Lazio	2016–17	Serie A	19	0	2	0	—				21	0
Lazio	2017–18	Serie A	11	0	1	0	9 (Note: Appearance(s) in UEFA Europa League)	0	0	0	21	0
Lazio	2018–19	Serie A	15	0	1	0	1	0	—		17	0
Lazio	2019–20	Serie A	21	0	2	1	1	0	0	0	24	1
Lazio	2020–21	Serie A	25	0	2	0	6	0	—		33	0
Lazio	2021–22	Serie A	24	1	2	0	4	1	—		30	2
Lazio	2022–23	Serie A	18	0	2	0	6 (Note: Four appearances in UEFA Europa League, two appearances in UEFA Europa Conference League)	0	—		26	0
Lazio	2023–24	Serie A	20	2	4	0	5	0	0	0	29	2
Lazio	2024–25	Serie A	10	1	1	0	7	0	—		18	1
Lazio	2025–26	Serie A	14	0	2	0	—				16	0
Lazio	Total		186	4	19	1	39	1	0	0	244	6
Career total			273	8	19	1	40	1	0	0	332	10

== Honours ==
Lazio

- Coppa Italia: 2018–19
- Supercoppa Italiana: 2017, 2019
