= 2023–24 Adanaspor season =

Adanaspor
2023–24 season
- Manager: Özhan Pulat (until 5 October); Eyüp Arin (caretaker, from 6 October to 3 November); Mustafa Kaplan (from 3 November to 18 January); Mustafa Kaplan (from 3 November to 18 January); Eyüp Arın (from 19 January to 30 January); Kemal Kılıç (from 31 January)
- Stadium: New Adana Stadium
- TFF First League: 14th
- Turkish Cup: Fifth round

The 2023–24 season was Adanaspor's 60th season in existence and seventh consecutive in the TFF First League, the second division of Turkish football. They also competed in the Turkish Cup.

== Players ==
=== First-team squad ===
As of 15 September 2023

Note: Flags indicate national team as defined under FIFA eligibility rules; some limited exceptions apply. Players may hold more than one non-FIFA nationality.

No.	Pos.	Nation	Player
1	GK	TUR	Ahmet Kıvanç
3	DF	TUR	Hüseyin Öztürk
4	DF	TUR	Batuhan Yilmaz
5	MF	TUR	Kubilay Aktaş
6	MF	TUR	Devran Senyurt
7	FW	TUR	Metehan Altunbaş
8	MF	TUR	Harun Alpsoy
10	FW	SUI	Dimitri Oberlin
11	FW	CMR	Eric Ayuk
13	GK	TUR	Arda Akbulut (on loan from Trabzonspor)
14	MF	TUR	Hakki Türker
15	DF	BEL	Jordan Lukaku
20	MF	TUR	İbrahim Aksu
22	DF	TUR	Fatih Kuruçuk
23	DF	TUR	Evren Korkmaz
25	GK	TUR	Muhammed Emin Çelik

No.	Pos.	Nation	Player
26	DF	TUR	Feyzi Yıldırım
27	FW	NZL	Joe Champness
28	MF	FRA	Check Oumar Diakité
30	MF	TUR	Mutlu Aksu Dogan
42	MF	FRA	Abdoulaye Dabo
47	MF	FRA	Samuel Yépié Yépié
61	MF	TUR	Serhat Kot
64	DF	TUR	Cem Güzelbay
70	FW	TUR	Burhan Tuzun
77	DF	TUR	Ferhat Katipoğlu
99	FW	TUR	Muhammet Enes Gök
—	DF	TUR	Hıdır Aytekin
—	MF	SUI	Shirvan Tas
—	FW	TUR	Hakan Eroğlu
—	FW	CHI	Junior Fernandes

=== Out on loan ===
Note: Flags indicate national team as defined under FIFA eligibility rules; some limited exceptions apply. Players may hold more than one non-FIFA nationality.

No.	Pos.	Nation	Player
—	MF	TUR	Metehan Mollaoğlu (at 1922 Konyaspor until 30 June 2024)

== Transfers ==
=== In ===
Pos.	Player	Transferred from	Fee	Date	Source

=== Out ===
Pos.	Player	Transferred to	Fee	Date	Source

== Pre-season and friendlies ==
Win Draw Loss

7 August 2023 Friendly	Adanaspor (Turkey)	0–2	(Turkey) Karşıyaka	Bolu
		Report

== Competitions ==
=== Overall record ===
Competition	First match	Last match	Starting round	Final position	Record							
Competition	First match	Last match	Starting round	Final position	Pld	W	D	L	GF	GA	GD	Win %
TFF First League	11 August 2023	11 May 2024	Matchday 1	14th	34	11	6	17	28	45	−17	32.35
Turkish Cup	1 November 2023	17 January 2024	Third round	Fifth round	3	2	0	1	7	6	+1	66.67
Total					37	13	6	18	35	51	−16	35.14

Source: Soccerway

=== TFF First League ===
==== League table ====
Pos	Team	Pld	W	D	L	GF	GA	GD	Pts	Qualification or relegation
12	Manisa	34	9	13	12	40	40	0	40 (Note: Ranked on goal difference: Manisa (0), Ankara Keçiörengücü (–9).)	
13	Keçiörengücü	34	10	10	14	34	43	−9	40	
14	Adanaspor	34	11	6	17	28	45	−17	39	
15	Şanlıurfaspor	34	9	11	14	32	37	−5	38 (Note: Ranked on goal difference: Şanlıurfaspor (–5), Tuzlaspor (–12).)	
16	Tuzlaspor (R)	34	9	11	14	35	47	−12	38	Relegation to the TFF Second League

Updated to match(es) played on 11 May 2024. Source: TFF
Rules for classification: 1) Points; 2) Head-to-head points; 3) Head-to-head goal difference; 4) Head-to-head goals scored; 5) Goal difference; 6) Goals scored
(R) Relegated

==== Results summary ====
Overall								Home						Away					
Pld	W	D	L	GF	GA	GD	Pts	W	D	L	GF	GA	GD	W	D	L	GF	GA	GD
23	7	2	14	20	35	−15	23	4	1	6	11	16	−5	3	1	8	9	19	−10

Last updated: 18 February 2024.

==== Results by round ====
Round	1	2	3	4	5	6	7	8	9	10	11	12	13	14	15	16	17	18	19	20	21	22	23	24	25
Ground	A	H	A	H	A	H	A	H	A	H	A	H	A	H	A	H	A	H	A	H	A	H	A	H	A
Result	W	L	L	L	L	W	L	W	L	W	L	L	W	L	D	L	W	D	L	L	L	W	L	L	
Position	2	7	10	13	14	12	13	11	12	12	13	13	12	14	14	14	14	13	14	14	15	14	14	16	

Updated to match(es) played on 18 February 2024. Source:
A = Away; H = Home; W = Win; D = Draw; L = Loss

==== Matches ====
The league fixtures were unveiled on 19 July 2023.

11 August 2023 1	Boluspor	0–2	Adanaspor	Bolu
21:00				Stadium: Bolu Atatürk Stadium

19 August 2023 2	Adanaspor	1–2	Şanlıurfaspor	Adana
21:45				Stadium: New Adana Stadium

27 August 2023 3	Ankara Keçiörengücü	1–0	Adanaspor	Ankara
17:00	Çetin 90+5'			Stadium: Ankara Aktepe Stadium

1 September 2023 4	Adanaspor	0–2	Kocaelispor	Adana
21:00				Stadium: New Adana Stadium

11 February 2024 22	Adanaspor	2–1	Tuzlaspor	Adana
				Stadium: New Adana Stadium

18 February 2023 23	Erzurumspor	1–0	Adanaspor	Erzurum
13:30				Stadium: Kazım Karabekir Stadium

24 February 2023 24	Adanaspor	0–3	Göztepe	Adana
19:00				Stadium: New Adana Stadium

3 March 2023 25	Giresunspor	0–1	Adanaspor	Giresun
13:30				Stadium: Çotanak Sports Complex

9 March 2024 26	Adanaspor	0–0	Sakaryaspor	Adana
				Stadium: New Adana Stadium

3 April 2024 28	Adanaspor	1–0	Eyüpspor	Adana
				Stadium: New Adana Stadium

15 April 2024 30	Adanaspor	1–1	Bodrum	Adana
				Stadium: New Adana Stadium

28 April 2024 32	Adanaspor	1–1	Manisa	Adana
				Stadium: New Adana Stadium

11 May 2024 34	Adanaspor	1–0	Bandırmaspor	Adana
				Stadium: New Adana Stadium

=== Turkish Cup ===
1 November 2023 Third round	Adanaspor	5–0	Hacettepe 1945	Adana
14:00	Sipahioğlu 59' (o.g.); Altunbaş 76' (pen.), 78'; Kot 86' (pen.); Katipoğlu 89'			Stadium: Yeni Adana

6 December 2023 Fourth round	Adanaspor	2–0	Esenler Erokspor	Adana
14:00	Tuzun 55'; Altunbaş 87'			Stadium: Yeni Adana

17 January 2024 Fifth round	Fenerbahçe	6–0	Adanaspor	Istanbul
21:00	Lincoln 29'; Batshuayi 39', 50', 68', 72'; Yandaş 81'			Stadium: Ülker
