= 2016–17 SS Lazio season =

Lazio
2016–17 season
- President: Claudio Lotito
- Manager: Simone Inzaghi
- Stadium: Stadio Olimpico
- Serie A: 5th
- Coppa Italia: Runners-up
- Top goalscorer: League: Ciro Immobile (23); All: Ciro Immobile (26)
- Highest home attendance: 40,000 vs Roma (4 December 2016, Serie A)
- Lowest home attendance: 10,000 vs Cagliari (26 October 2016, Serie A) vs Genoa (18 January 2017, Coppa Italia)
- Average home league attendance: 20,453
- Biggest win: 7–3 vs Sampdoria; 6–2 vs Pescara; 6–2 vs Palermo
- Biggest defeat: 0–3 vs Inter Milan; 0–3 vs Napoli
| Home colours | Away colours | Third colours |

The 2016–17 season was the 117th season in Società Sportiva Lazio's history and their 29th consecutive season in the top-flight of Italian football. Lazio competed in Serie A, finishing fifth, and in the Coppa Italia, where they finished as runners-up to Juventus, losing the final 2–0.

Following the extremely brief tenure of Marcelo Bielsa during pre-season, Simone Inzaghi, who had acted as interim coach following Stefano Pioli's sacking in the second half of the 2015–16 season, assumed the post permanently.

New signing Ciro Immobile finished as the club's top scorer with 23 goals in Serie A and 26 in total.

== Players ==
=== Squad information ===
As of 3 February 2017

Note: Flags indicate national team as defined under FIFA eligibility rules; some limited exceptions apply. Players may hold more than one non-FIFA nationality.

| No. | Pos. | Nation | Player |
|---|---|---|---|
| 1 | GK | ALB | Thomas Strakosha |
| 2 | DF | NED | Wesley Hoedt |
| 3 | DF | NED | Stefan de Vrij |
| 4 | DF | ESP | Patric |
| 6 | DF | BEL | Jordan Lukaku |
| 8 | DF | SRB | Dušan Basta |
| 9 | FW | SRB | Filip Đorđević |
| 10 | MF | BRA | Felipe Anderson |
| 11 | MF | ITA | Luca Crecco |
| 13 | DF | BRA | Wallace |
| 14 | FW | SEN | Keita Baldé |
| 15 | DF | ANG | Bastos |
| 16 | MF | ITA | Marco Parolo |

| No. | Pos. | Nation | Player |
|---|---|---|---|
| 17 | FW | ITA | Ciro Immobile |
| 18 | MF | ESP | Luis Alberto |
| 19 | MF | BIH | Senad Lulić |
| 20 | MF | ARG | Lucas Biglia (captain) |
| 21 | MF | SRB | Sergej Milinković-Savić |
| 22 | GK | ITA | Federico Marchetti |
| 25 | FW | ITA | Cristiano Lombardi |
| 26 | DF | ROU | Ștefan Radu (vice-captain) |
| 55 | GK | CRO | Ivan Vargić |
| 71 | FW | ESP | Mamadou Tounkara |
| 96 | MF | ITA | Alessandro Murgia |
| 97 | FW | ITA | Alessandro Rossi |

== Transfers ==
=== In ===
| Date | Pos. | Player | Age | Moving from | Fee | Notes | Source |
|---|---|---|---|---|---|---|---|
| 22 July 2016 | DF | (Belgium) Jordan Lukaku | 21 | (Belgium) Oostende | €4M | Plus €1M in performance-related bonuses | |
| 27 July 2016 | FW | (Italy) Ciro Immobile | 26 | (Spain) Sevilla | €8.75M | | |
| 29 July 2016 | DF | (Brazil) Wallace | 21 | (Portugal) Braga | €8M | | |
| 12 August 2016 | MF | (Germany) Moritz Leitner | 23 | (Germany) Borussia Dortmund | €1.5M | | |
| 17 August 2016 | DF | (Angola) Bastos | 24 | (Russia) Rostov | €5M | | |
| 31 August 2016 | MF | (Spain) Luis Alberto | 23 | (England) Liverpool | €4M | | |

=== Out ===
| Date | Pos. | Player | Age | Moving to | Fee | Notes | Source |
|---|---|---|---|---|---|---|---|
| 1 July 2016 | FW | (Germany) Miroslav Klose | 38 | End of contract | Free | | |
| 1 July 2016 | MF | (Italy) Stefano Mauri | 36 | End of contract | Free | | |
| 1 July 2016 | FW | (Italy) Alessandro Matri | 31 | (Italy) Milan | Free | Loan return | |
| 1 July 2016 | DF | (France) Abdoulay Konko | 32 | (Italy) Atalanta | Free | End of contract | |
| 18 July 2016 | DF | (Argentina) Santiago Gentiletti | 31 | (Italy) Genoa | | Contract expiration | |
| 2 August 2016 | MF | (Nigeria) Ogenyi Onazi | 23 | (Turkey) Trabzonspor | €3.5M | | |
| 3 August 2016 | MF | (Italy) Antonio Candreva | 29 | (Italy) Internazionale | €22M | | |
| 24 August 2016 | DF | (Serbia) Milan Biševac | 32 | (France) Metz | | | |
| 29 August 2016 | DF | (Brazil) Maurício | 27 | (Russia) Spartak Moscow | | On loan until the end of the season | |
| 31 August 2016 | MF | (Australia) Chris Ikonomidis | 22 | (Denmark) Aarhus Gymnastikforening | | On loan until the end of the season | |
| 13 January 2017 | MF | (Italy) Danilo Cataldi | 22 | (Italy) Genoa | | On loan until the end of the season | |
| 21 January 2017 | MF | (Cameroon) Joseph Minala | 20 | (Italy) Salernitana | | On loan until the end of the season, with option to buy | |
| 31 January 2017 | MF | (England) Ravel Morrison | 23 | (England) Queens Park Rangers | | On loan until the end of the season, with option to buy | |
| 31 January 2017 | FW | (Netherlands) Ricardo Kishna | 22 | (France) Lille | | On loan until the end of the season, with option to buy | |
| 31 January 2017 | MF | (Germany) Moritz Leitner | 24 | (Germany) Augsburg | | | |
| 3 February 2017 | MF | (Uruguay) Álvaro González | 32 | (Uruguay) Nacional | | | |

== Pre-season and friendlies ==
| 13 July 2016 Friendly | Lazio | 19–0 | Auronzo | Auronzo di Cadore, Italy |
| 17:00 CEST (UTC+02:00) | Đorđević 2', 36'; Milinković-Savić 8', 30'; Kishna 9', 41', 59', 69'; Ikonomidis 15', 24', 25'; Maurício 22'; Palombi 53'; Murgia 55'; Morrison 65'; Javorčić 78'; Lombardi 82'; Onazi 85', 86' | Report | | Stadium: Stadio Rodolfo Zandegiacomo; Referee: Luca Balbinot |

| 17 July 2016 Friendly | Lazio | 6–0 | Brasil Team | Auronzo di Cadore, Italy |
| 17:00 CEST (UTC+02:00) | Murgia 32'; Ikonomidis 42' (pen.); Cataldi 61' (pen.); Lombardi 73', 81'; Palombi 79' | Report | | Stadium: Stadio Rodolfo Zandegiacomo; Referee: Brighini |

| 20 July 2016 Friendly | Lazio | 2–1 | Padova | Auronzo di Cadore, Italy |
| 17:00 CEST (UTC+02:00) | Cataldi 4' (pen.); Đorđević 30' | Report | Altinier 28' | Stadium: Stadio Rodolfo Zandegiacomo; Referee: Daniel Amabile |

| 23 July 2016 Friendly | Lazio | 1–1 (4–3 p) | SPAL | Auronzo di Cadore, Italy |
| 16:00 CEST (UTC+02:00) | Đorđević 57' | Report | Grassi 87' | Stadium: Stadio Rodolfo Zandegiacomo |
| | Penalties |
| | Cataldi (penalty scored); Ikonomidis (penalty scored); Onazi (penalty missed); Morrison (penalty scored); Hoedt (penalty scored) | | (penalty missed) Zigoni; (penalty scored) Grassi; (penalty scored) Giani; (penalty scored) Beghetto; (penalty missed) Posocco |

| 13 August 2016 Friendly | Borussia Mönchengladbach | 0–0 | Lazio | Mönchengladbach, Germany |
| 15:30 CEST (UTC+02:00) | | Report | | Stadium: Borussia-Park; Referee: Bastian Börner |

== Competitions ==
=== Serie A ===
==== League table ====
| Pos | Team | Pld | W | D | L | GF | GA | GD | Pts | Qualification or relegation |
|---|---|---|---|---|---|---|---|---|---|---|
| 3 | Napoli | 38 | 26 | 8 | 4 | 94 | 39 | +55 | 86 | Qualification for the Champions League play-off round |
| 4 | Atalanta | 38 | 21 | 9 | 8 | 62 | 41 | +21 | 72 | Qualification for the Europa League group stage (Note: Since the winners of the 2016–17 Coppa Italia, Juventus, qualified for European competition based on league position, the spot awarded to the cup winners (Europa League group stage) was passed to the fifth-placed team and the spot awarded to the fifth-placed team (Europa League third qualifying round) was passed to the sixth-placed team.) |
| 5 | Lazio | 38 | 21 | 7 | 10 | 74 | 51 | +23 | 70 | Qualification for the Europa League group stage |
| 6 | Milan | 38 | 18 | 9 | 11 | 57 | 45 | +12 | 63 | Qualification for the Europa League third qualifying round |
| 7 | Internazionale | 38 | 19 | 5 | 14 | 72 | 49 | +23 | 62 | |

Source: Serie A, Soccerway
Rules for classification: 1) Points; 2) Head-to-head points; 3) Head-to-head goal difference; 4) Goal difference; 5) Goals scored; 6) Draw.

==== Results summary ====
| Overall | | | | | | | | Home | | | | | | Away | | | | | |
| Pld | W | D | L | GF | GA | GD | Pts | W | D | L | GF | GA | GD | W | D | L | GF | GA | GD |
|---|---|---|---|---|---|---|---|---|---|---|---|---|---|---|---|---|---|---|---|
| 38 | 21 | 7 | 10 | 74 | 51 | +23 | 70 | 12 | 2 | 5 | 40 | 23 | +17 | 9 | 5 | 5 | 34 | 28 | +6 |

Last updated: 28 May 2017.
Source: Competitive matches

==== Results by round ====
| Round | 1 | 2 | 3 | 4 | 5 | 6 | 7 | 8 | 9 | 10 | 11 | 12 | 13 | 14 | 15 | 16 | 17 | 18 | 19 | 20 | 21 | 22 | 23 | 24 | 25 | 26 | 27 | 28 | 29 | 30 | 31 | 32 | 33 | 34 | 35 | 36 | 37 | 38 |
|---|---|---|---|---|---|---|---|---|---|---|---|---|---|---|---|---|---|---|---|---|---|---|---|---|---|---|---|---|---|---|---|---|---|---|---|---|---|---|
| Ground | A | H | A | H | A | H | A | H | A | H | H | A | H | A | H | A | H | A | H | H | A | H | A | H | A | H | A | H | A | A | H | A | H | A | H | A | H | A |
| Result | W | L | D | W | L | W | W | D | D | W | W | D | W | W | L | W | W | L | W | W | L | L | W | D | W | W | W | W | D | W | L | D | W | W | W | L | L | L |
| Position | 4 | 9 | 10 | 4 | 9 | 5 | 4 | 6 | 6 | 5 | 4 | 4 | 4 | 4 | 5 | 5 | 4 | 4 | 4 | 4 | 4 | 5 | 4 | 6 | 6 | 5 | 4 | 4 | 4 | 4 | 4 | 4 | 4 | 4 | 4 | 4 | 4 | 5 |

Updated to match(es) played on 28 May 2017. Source: Competitive matches
A = Away; H = Home; W = Win; D = Draw; L = Loss

==== Matches ====
| 21 August 2016 1 | Atalanta | 3–4 | Lazio | Bergamo |
| 20:45 CEST (UTC+02:00) | Conti (yellow card) 45+1'; Kessié 63', 67'; Raimondi (yellow card) 68'; Petagna 90+1' | Report | Immobile 15', (yellow card) 90+3'; Hoedt 20'; Lombardi 33'; Lukaku (yellow card) 62'; Cataldi 89' | Stadium: Stadio Atleti Azzurri d'Italia; Attendance: 14,710; Referee: Luca Banti |

| 27 August 2016 2 | Lazio | 0–1 | Juventus | Rome |
| 18:00 CEST (UTC+02:00) | Radu (yellow card) 18' | Report | Alex Sandro (yellow card) 43'; Lemina (yellow card) 61'; Khedira 66' | Stadium: Stadio Olimpico; Attendance: 36,000; Referee: Marco Guida |

| 11 September 2016 3 | Chievo | 1–1 | Lazio | Verona |
| 15:00 CEST (UTC+02:00) | Gamberini 51'; Hetemaj (yellow card) 54'; Cesar (yellow card) 90+2' | Report | De Vrij 55'; Parolo (yellow card) 60'; Milinković-Savić (yellow card) 68'; Basta (yellow card) 87'; Felipe Anderson (yellow card) 90+1'; Radu (yellow card) 90+2' | Stadium: Stadio Marc'Antonio Bentegodi; Attendance: 10,000; Referee: Daniele Orsato |

| 17 September 2016 4 | Lazio | 3–0 | Pescara | Rome |
| 18:00 CEST (UTC+02:00) | Bastos (yellow card) 34'; Radu (yellow card) 49', (goal) 72'; Milinković-Savić 67'; Immobile 76' | Report | Campagnaro (yellow card) 17'; Verre (yellow card) 28' | Stadium: Stadio Olimpico; Attendance: 12,000; Referee: Fabio Maresca |

| 20 September 2016 5 | Milan | 2–0 | Lazio | Milan |
| 20:45 CEST (UTC+02:00) | Bacca 37'; Calabria (yellow card) 62'; Niang 74' (pen.) | Report | Bastos (yellow card) 45+1'; Cataldi (yellow card) 59'; Radu (yellow card) 73'; De Vrij (yellow card) 76' | Stadium: San Siro; Attendance: 26,464; Referee: Davide Massa |

| 25 September 2016 6 | Lazio | 2–0 | Empoli | Rome |
| 15:00 CEST (UTC+02:00) | Keita 29'; Felipe Anderson (yellow card) 35'; Cataldi (yellow card) 73'; Lulić 90' | Report | Zambelli (yellow card) 11'; Pasqual (yellow card) 58' | Stadium: Stadio Olimpico; Attendance: 10,100; Referee: Michael Fabbri |

| 1 October 2016 7 | Udinese | 0–3 | Lazio | Udine |
| 20:45 CEST (UTC+02:00) | Heurtaux (yellow card) 21'; Felipe (yellow card) 40' | Report | Immobile 28', 61'; Keita 54'; Patric (yellow card) 84' | Stadium: Stadio Friuli; Attendance: 16,648; Referee: Carmine Russo |

| 16 October 2016 8 | Lazio | 1–1 | Bologna | Rome |
| 15:00 CEST (UTC+02:00) | Radu (yellow card) 67'; Felipe Anderson (yellow card) 84'; Wallace (yellow card) 87'; Immobile (yellow card) 90', (goal) 90+7' (pen.) | Report | Helander 10'; Di Francesco (yellow card) 37'; Masina (yellow card) 57'; Sadiq (yellow card) 90+6' | Stadium: Stadio Olimpico; Attendance: 15,000; Referee: Marco Di Bello |

| 23 October 2016 9 | Torino | 2–2 | Lazio | Turin |
| 15:00 CEST (UTC+02:00) | Falque 20'; Barreca (yellow card) 29'; Belotti (yellow card) 61'; Ljajić 90+2' (pen.) | Report | Parolo (yellow card) 59'; Immobile 71'; Murgia 84'; Cataldi (yellow card) 90+1' | Stadium: Stadio Olimpico Grande Torino; Attendance: 21,517; Referee: Piero Giacomelli |

| 26 October 2016 10 | Lazio | 4–1 | Cagliari | Rome |
| 20:45 CEST (UTC+02:00) | Keita 6', (yellow card) 42'; Immobile 23' (pen.), 28'; Wallace (yellow card) 30'; Felipe Anderson 79' | Report | Ceppitelli (yellow card) 22'; Tachtsidis (yellow card) 42'; Dessena (yellow card) 80'; Wallace 87' (o.g.) | Stadium: Stadio Olimpico; Attendance: 10,000; Referee: Domenico Celi |

| 30 October 2016 11 | Lazio | 2–1 | Sassuolo | Rome |
| 15:00 CET (UTC+01:00) | Felipe Anderson (yellow card) 35'; Lulić (yellow card) 36', (goal) 50'; Immobile 55' | Report | Acerbi (yellow card) 33'; Defrel 57' | Stadium: Stadio Olimpico; Attendance: 12,000; Referee: Gianpaolo Calvarese |

| 5 November 2016 12 | Napoli | 1–1 | Lazio | Naples |
| 20:45 CET (UTC+01:00) | Hamšík 52' | Report | Parolo (yellow card) 28'; Radu (yellow card) 51'; Keita 54' | Stadium: Stadio San Paolo; Attendance: 29,994; Referee: Antonio Damato |

| 20 November 2016 13 | Lazio | 3–1 | Genoa | Rome |
| 15:00 CET (UTC+01:00) | Felipe Anderson 11'; Biglia 57' (pen.); Wallace 65'; Patric (yellow card) 88' | Report | Ocampos 52'; Rincón (yellow card) 60'; Veloso (yellow card) 87'; Edenílson (yellow card) 88'; Orbán (red card) 90+1' | Stadium: Stadio Olimpico; Attendance: 20,000; Referee: Marco Di Bello |

| 27 November 2016 14 | Palermo | 0–1 | Lazio | Palermo |
| 12:30 CET (UTC+01:00) | Goldaniga (yellow card) 41'; Diamanti (yellow card) 42'; Bouy (yellow card) 75'; González (red card) 86' | Report | Lulić (yellow card) 14'; Milinković-Savić 31' | Stadium: Stadio Renzo Barbera; Attendance: 8,689; Referee: Marco Guida |

| 4 December 2016 15 | Lazio | 0–2 | Roma | Rome |
| 15:00 CET (UTC+01:00) | Biglia (yellow card) 29'; Cataldi (red card) 67'; Lulić (yellow card) 70'; Parolo (yellow card) 79'; Lombardi (yellow card) 90+4' | Report | Rüdiger (yellow card) 51'; Strootman 64', (yellow card) 67'; Nainggolan 77'; Peres (yellow card) 84' | Stadium: Stadio Olimpico; Attendance: 40,000; Referee: Luca Banti |
Note: Danilo Cataldi was sent off for fighting while a substitute.

| 10 December 2016 16 | Sampdoria | 1–2 | Lazio | Genoa |
| 20:45 CET (UTC+01:00) | Regini (yellow card) 53'; Schick 89', (yellow card) 90+2' | Report | Milinković-Savić 40'; Parolo 44', (yellow card) 90'; Radu (yellow card) 48'; Biglia (yellow card) 58'; Wallace (yellow card) 72' | Stadium: Stadio Luigi Ferraris; Attendance: 18,829; Referee: Carmine Russo |

| 18 December 2016 17 | Lazio | 3–1 | Fiorentina | Rome |
| 15:00 CET (UTC+01:00) | Keita 23'; Biglia 45+4' (pen.); Bastos (yellow card) 57'; Radu 90' | Report | Tomović (yellow card) 26'; Olivera (yellow card) 49'; Zárate 64'; Bernardeschi (yellow card) 75'; Astori (yellow card) 77'; Sánchez (yellow card) 85' | Stadium: Stadio Olimpico; Attendance: 20,000; Referee: Massimiliano Irrati |

| 21 December 2016 18 | Internazionale | 3–0 | Lazio | Milan |
| 20:45 CET (UTC+01:00) | Banega 54'; Icardi 56', 65'; Ansaldi (yellow card) 57'; Miranda (yellow card) 76' | Report | Felipe Anderson (yellow card) 58'; Lulić (yellow card) 63' | Stadium: San Siro; Attendance: 37,868; Referee: Paolo Mazzoleni |

| 8 January 2017 19 | Lazio | 1–0 | Crotone | Rome |
| 15:00 CET (UTC+01:00) | Lombardi (yellow card) 15'; Immobile 90', (yellow card) 90' | Report | Festa (yellow card) 54'; Rohdén (yellow card) 77' | Stadium: Stadio Olimpico; Attendance: 15,000; Referee: Fabio Maresca |

| 15 January 2017 20 | Lazio | 2–1 | Atalanta | Rome |
| 15:00 CET (UTC+01:00) | Immobile (yellow card) 21', (goal) 68' (pen.); Parolo (yellow card) 43'; Milinković-Savić 45+1', (yellow card) 88'; Lulić (yellow card) 59'; Biglia (yellow card) 87' | Report | Petagna 21'; Conti (yellow card) 55'; Grassi (yellow card) 90+3' | Stadium: Stadio Olimpico; Attendance: 11,500; Referee: Luca Pairetto |

| 22 January 2017 21 | Juventus | 2–0 | Lazio | Turin |
| 12:30 CET (UTC+01:00) | Dybala 5'; Higuaín 17' | Report | Radu (yellow card) 19'; Immobile (yellow card) 26'; Parolo (yellow card) 83' | Stadium: Juventus Stadium; Attendance: 39,917; Referee: Davide Massa |

| 28 January 2017 22 | Lazio | 0–1 | Chievo | Rome |
| 18:00 CET (UTC+01:00) | Milinković-Savić (yellow card) 31'; Lulić (yellow card) 85' | Report | Cacciatore (yellow card) 45'; Izco (yellow card) 70'; Inglese 90' | Stadium: Stadio Olimpico; Attendance: 12,000; Referee: Michael Fabbri |

| 5 February 2017 23 | Pescara | 2–6 | Lazio | Pescara |
| 15:00 CET (UTC+01:00) | Benali 29'; Brugman 41' | Report | Parolo 10', 14', 49', 77'; Keita 57'; Biglia (yellow card) 76'; Immobile 77' | Stadium: Stadio Adriatico – Giovanni Cornacchia; Attendance: 11,511; Referee: Piero Giacomelli |

| 13 February 2017 24 | Lazio | 1–1 | Milan | Rome |
| 20:45 CET (UTC+01:00) | Biglia 45+1' (pen.); Radu (yellow card) 63'; Milinković-Savić (yellow card) 89' | Report | Vangioni (yellow card) 24'; Fernández (yellow card) 81'; Suso 85' | Stadium: Stadio Olimpico; Attendance: 25,000; Referee: Antonio Damato |

| 18 February 2017 25 | Empoli | 1–2 | Lazio | Empoli |
| 20:45 CET (UTC+01:00) | Costa (yellow card) 2'; Krunić 67'; Dioussé (yellow card) 84'; Veseli (yellow card) 90+3' | Report | Biglia (yellow card) 60'; Immobile 68'; Keita 80' | Stadium: Stadio Carlo Castellani; Attendance: 8,743; Referee: Nicola Rizzoli |

| 26 February 2017 26 | Lazio | 1–0 | Udinese | Rome |
| 15:00 CET (UTC+01:00) | Hoedt (yellow card) 45+1'; De Vrij (yellow card) 54'; Immobile 72' (pen.) | Report | Ali Adnan (yellow card) 71'; Danilo (yellow card) 78'; Jankto (yellow card) 90+2' | Stadium: Stadio Olimpico; Attendance: 15,000; Referee: Luca Pairetto |

| 5 March 2017 27 | Bologna | 0–2 | Lazio | Bologna |
| 20:45 CET (UTC+01:00) | Maietta (yellow card) 64'; Džemaili (yellow card) 73' | Report | Immobile 9', 74'; Keita (yellow card) 73' | Stadium: Stadio Renato Dall'Ara; Attendance: 18,262; Referee: Carmine Russo |

| 13 March 2017 28 | Lazio | 3–1 | Torino | Rome |
| 20:45 CET (UTC+01:00) | Lukaku (yellow card) 44'; Immobile 56'; Milinković-Savić (yellow card) 74'; Parolo (yellow card) 86'; Keita 87'; Felipe Anderson 90' | Report | Ljajić (yellow card) 38'; López 72' | Stadium: Stadio Olimpico; Attendance: 15,000; Referee: Paolo Mazzoleni |

| 19 March 2017 29 | Cagliari | 0–0 | Lazio | Cagliari |
| 15:00 CET (UTC+01:00) | Faragò (yellow card) 28'; Pisacane (yellow card) 71'; Isla (yellow card) 72' | Report | Biglia (yellow card) 70'; De Vrij (yellow card) 81' | Stadium: Stadio Sant'Elia; Attendance: 15,536; Referee: Marco Guida |

| 1 April 2017 30 | Sassuolo | 1–2 | Lazio | Reggio Emilia |
| 18:00 CEST (UTC+02:00) | Berardi 26' (pen.); Pellegrini (yellow card) 32'; Lirola (yellow card) 89' | Report | Lulić (yellow card) 5'; Strakosha (yellow card) 26'; Hoedt (yellow card) 33'; Immobile 42'; Consigli 83' (o.g.); Keita (yellow card) 90' | Stadium: Mapei Stadium – Città del Tricolore; Attendance: 12,737; Referee: Piero Giacomelli |

| 9 April 2017 31 | Lazio | 0–3 | Napoli | Rome |
| 20:45 CEST (UTC+02:00) | Bastos (yellow card) 20'; Milinković-Savić (yellow card) 54'; Patric (yellow card) 89' | Report | Callejón 25'; Insigne 51', 90+2'; Allan (yellow card) 74'; Zieliński (yellow card) 85'; Hysaj (yellow card) 86' | Stadium: Stadio Olimpico; Attendance: 25,000; Referee: Massimiliano Irrati |

| 15 April 2017 32 | Genoa | 2–2 | Lazio | Genoa |
| 15:00 CEST (UTC+02:00) | Simeone 10'; Palladino (yellow card) 40'; Rigoni (yellow card) 44'; Burdisso (yellow card) 45+1'; Pandev 78', (yellow card) 79' | Report | Parolo (yellow card) 25'; Milinković-Savić (yellow card) 30'; Biglia 45+2'; Basta (yellow card) 55'; Luis Alberto 90+1'; Lombardi (yellow card) 90+3' | Stadium: Stadio Luigi Ferraris; Attendance: 19,545; Referee: Fabio Maresca |

| 23 April 2017 33 | Lazio | 6–2 | Palermo | Rome |
| 15:00 CEST (UTC+02:00) | Immobile 8', 9'; Keita 21', 24' (pen.), 26'; Milinković-Savić (yellow card) 59'; Crecco 90' | Report | Rispoli 46', 52'; Gazzi (yellow card) 63' | Stadium: Stadio Olimpico; Attendance: 25,000; Referee: Michael Fabbri |

| 30 April 2017 34 | Roma | 1–3 | Lazio | Rome |
| 12:30 CEST (UTC+02:00) | De Rossi 45' (pen.); Rüdiger (red card) 90+3' | Report | Keita 12', 85', (yellow card) 87'; Biglia (yellow card) 45'; Basta 50'; Hoedt (yellow card) 81'; Parolo (yellow card) 90+3' | Stadium: Stadio Olimpico; Attendance: 43,794; Referee: Daniele Orsato |

| 7 May 2017 35 | Lazio | 7–3 | Sampdoria | Rome |
| 15:00 CEST (UTC+02:00) | Keita 2'; Immobile 19' (pen.), 70'; Hoedt 36'; Felipe Anderson 38' (pen.); De Vrij 45'; Lulić 65' | Report | Škriniar (red card) 18'; Linetty 32'; Quagliarella 72', 90' (pen.), (yellow card) 78' | Stadium: Stadio Olimpico; Attendance: 40,000; Referee: Paolo Mazzoleni |

| 13 May 2017 36 | Fiorentina | 3–2 | Lazio | Florence |
| 18:00 CEST (UTC+02:00) | Astori (yellow card) 26'; Babacar 67'; Kalinić 73'; Lombardi 76' (o.g.); Valero (yellow card) 90+1' | Report | Parolo (yellow card) 26'; Keita 55'; Radu (yellow card) 64'; Murgia 81'; Hoedt (yellow card) 90+3' | Stadium: Stadio Artemio Franchi; Attendance: 25,770; Referee: Domenico Celi |

| 21 May 2017 37 | Lazio | 1–3 | Internazionale | Rome |
| 20:45 CEST (UTC+02:00) | Keita 18' (pen.), (yellow card) 61' (yellow-red card) 66'; Hoedt (yellow card) 46'; Lulić (yellow card) 71' (yellow-red card) 78'; Lombardi (yellow card) 80' | Report | Murillo (yellow card) 17'; Andreolli 31'; Hoedt 37' (o.g.); Éder (yellow card) 48', (goal) 74' | Stadium: Stadio Olimpico; Attendance: 30,000; Referee: Marco Di Bello |

| 28 May 2017 38 | Crotone | 3–1 | Lazio | Crotone |
| 20:45 CEST (UTC+02:00) | Nalini 14', 60', (yellow card) 60'; Falcinelli 22', (yellow card) 23'; Crisetig (yellow card) 33' | Report | Bastos (yellow card) 21' (yellow-red card) 42'; Immobile 26' (pen.); Patric (yellow card) 42'; Biglia (yellow card) 45+1'; Murgia (yellow card) 58' | Stadium: Stadio Ezio Scida; Attendance: 14,594; Referee: Gianluca Rocchi |

=== Coppa Italia ===
| 18 January 2017 Round of 16 | Lazio | 4–2 | Genoa | Rome |
| 20:45 CET (UTC+01:00) | Đorđević 20'; Hoedt 31'; Patric (yellow card) 58'; Lulić (yellow card) 59'; Milinković-Savić 70'; Immobile 75' | Report | Pinilla 41'; Pandev 45'; Rigoni (yellow card) 56'; Gentiletti (yellow card) 76' | Stadium: Stadio Olimpico; Attendance: 10,000; Referee: Antonio Damato |

| 31 January 2017 Quarter-finals | Internazionale | 1–2 | Lazio | Milan |
| 20:45 CET (UTC+01:00) | D'Ambrosio (yellow card) 45'; Miranda (red card) 54'; Brozović 84', (yellow card) 90+1' | Report | Felipe Anderson 20'; Hoedt (yellow card) 44'; Radu (yellow card) 45' (yellow-red card) 76'; Lulić (yellow card) 45+2'; Parolo (yellow card) 52'; Biglia 56' (pen.); Patric (yellow card) 79' | Stadium: San Siro; Attendance: 31,757; Referee: Marco Guida |

| 1 March 2017 Semi-finals; First leg | Lazio | 2–0 | Roma | Rome |
| 20:45 CET (UTC+01:00) | Milinković-Savić 29'; Parolo (yellow card) 41'; Strakosha (yellow card) 76'; Immobile 78'; Biglia (yellow card) 90+3' | Report | Rüdiger (yellow card) 72' | Stadium: Stadio Olimpico; Attendance: 28,000; Referee: Massimiliano Irrati |

| 4 April 2017 Semi-finals; Second leg | Roma | 3–2 (3–4 agg.) | Lazio | Rome |
| 20:45 CEST (UTC+02:00) | Nainggolan (yellow card) 26'; Džeko (yellow card) 31'; Paredes (yellow card) 39'; El Shaarawy 43'; Salah 66', 90'; Perotti (yellow card) 74' | Report | Felipe Anderson (yellow card) 31'; Milinković-Savić 37'; Lukaku (yellow card) 48'; Immobile 56' | Stadium: Stadio Olimpico; Attendance: 43,721; Referee: Nicola Rizzoli |

| 17 May 2017 Final | Juventus | 2–0 | Lazio | Rome |
| 21:00 CEST (UTC+02:00) | Dani Alves 12', (yellow card) 86'; Bonucci 24' | Report | | Stadium: Stadio Olimpico; Attendance: 66,341; Referee: Paolo Tagliavento |

== Statistics ==
=== Appearances and goals ===
| No. | Pos | Nat | Player | Total | | Serie A | | Coppa Italia | |
| No. | Pos | Nat | Player | Apps | Goals | Apps | Goals | Apps | Goals |
Goalkeepers
| 1 | GK | (Albania) ALB | Thomas Strakosha | 25 | 0 | 20+1 | 0 | 4 | 0 |
| 22 | GK | (Italy) ITA | Federico Marchetti | 18 | 0 | 17 | 0 | 1 | 0 |
| 55 | GK | (Croatia) CRO | Ivan Vargić | 1 | 0 | 1 | 0 | 0 | 0 |
Defenders
| 2 | DF | (Netherlands) NED | Wesley Hoedt | 25 | 4 | 21+2 | 2 | 2 | 1+1 |
| 3 | DF | (Netherlands) NED | Stefan de Vrij | 31 | 2 | 27 | 2 | 4 | 0 |
| 4 | DF | (Spain) ESP | Patric | 21 | 0 | 10+9 | 0 | 2 | 0 |
| 6 | DF | (Belgium) BEL | Jordan Lukaku | 20 | 0 | 8+8 | 0 | 3+1 | 0 |
| 8 | DF | (Serbia) SRB | Dušan Basta | 30 | 1 | 24+3 | 1 | 3 | 0 |
| 13 | DF | (Brazil) BRA | Wallace | 29 | 1 | 17+7 | 1 | 4+1 | 0 |
| 15 | DF | (Angola) ANG | Bastos | 14 | 0 | 10+1 | 0 | 3 | 0 |
| 26 | DF | (Romania) ROU | Ștefan Radu | 31 | 2 | 29 | 2 | 1+1 | 0 |
Midfielders
| 10 | MF | (Brazil) BRA | Felipe Anderson | 41 | 5 | 33+3 | 4 | 4+1 | 1 |
| 11 | MF | (Italy) ITA | Luca Crecco | 4 | 1 | 1+2 | 1 | 0+1 | 0 |
| 16 | MF | (Italy) ITA | Marco Parolo | 38 | 5 | 34 | 5 | 4 | 0 |
| 18 | MF | (Spain) ESP | Luis Alberto | 10 | 1 | 4+5 | 1 | 1 | 0 |
| 19 | MF | (Bosnia and Herzegovina) BIH | Senad Lulić | 34 | 3 | 29+2 | 3 | 3 | 0 |
| 20 | MF | (Argentina) ARG | Lucas Biglia | 34 | 5 | 28+1 | 4 | 5 | 1 |
| 21 | MF | (Serbia) SRB | Sergej Milinković-Savić | 38 | 7 | 30+3 | 4 | 3+2 | 3 |
| 96 | MF | (Italy) ITA | Alessandro Murgia | 18 | 2 | 4+10 | 2 | 1+3 | 0 |
Forwards
| 9 | FW | (Serbia) SRB | Filip Đorđević | 18 | 1 | 4+13 | 0 | 1 | 1 |
| 14 | FW | (Senegal) SEN | Keita Baldé | 34 | 16 | 21+10 | 16 | 1+2 | 0 |
| 17 | FW | (Italy) ITA | Ciro Immobile | 41 | 26 | 35+1 | 23 | 4+1 | 3 |
| 25 | FW | (Italy) ITA | Cristiano Lombardi | 18 | 1 | 3+15 | 1 | 0 | 0 |
| 43 | FW | (Italy) ITA | Giorgio Spizzichino | 1 | 0 | 0+1 | 0 | 0 | 0 |
| 71 | FW | (Spain) ESP | Mamadou Tounkara | 1 | 0 | 0+1 | 0 | 0 | 0 |
| 97 | FW | (Italy) ITA | Alessandro Rossi | 3 | 0 | 0+3 | 0 | 0 | 0 |
Players transferred out during the season
| 5 | MF | (Italy) ITA | Danilo Cataldi | 11 | 1 | 5+6 | 1 | 0 | 0 |
| 7 | FW | (Netherlands) NED | Ricardo Kishna | 5 | 0 | 2+3 | 0 | 0 | 0 |
| 23 | MF | (Germany) GER | Moritz Leitner | 2 | 0 | 0+2 | 0 | 0 | 0 |
| 44 | DF | (Croatia) CRO | Franjo Prce | 1 | 0 | 0+1 | 0 | 0 | 0 |

Last updated: 28 May 2017
Source: Competitions

=== Goalscorers ===
| Rank | No. | Pos | Nat | Name | Serie A | Coppa Italia | Total |
|---|---|---|---|---|---|---|---|
| 1 | 17 | FW | (Italy) | Ciro Immobile | 23 | 3 | 26 |
| 2 | 14 | FW | (Senegal) | Keita Baldé | 16 | 0 | 16 |
| 3 | 21 | MF | (Serbia) | Sergej Milinković-Savić | 4 | 3 | 7 |
| 4 | 10 | MF | (Brazil) | Felipe Anderson | 4 | 1 | 5 |
| 4 | 16 | MF | (Italy) | Marco Parolo | 5 | 0 | 5 |
| 4 | 20 | MF | (Argentina) | Lucas Biglia | 4 | 1 | 5 |
| 7 | 2 | DF | (Netherlands) | Wesley Hoedt | 2 | 1 | 3 |
| 7 | 19 | MF | (Bosnia and Herzegovina) | Senad Lulić | 3 | 0 | 3 |
| 9 | 3 | DF | (Netherlands) | Stefan de Vrij | 2 | 0 | 2 |
| 9 | 26 | DF | (Romania) | Ștefan Radu | 2 | 0 | 2 |
| 9 | 96 | MF | (Italy) | Alessandro Murgia | 2 | 0 | 2 |
| 12 | 5 | MF | (Italy) | Danilo Cataldi | 1 | 0 | 1 |
| 12 | 8 | DF | (Serbia) | Dušan Basta | 1 | 0 | 1 |
| 12 | 9 | FW | (Serbia) | Filip Đorđević | 0 | 1 | 1 |
| 12 | 11 | MF | (Italy) | Luca Crecco | 1 | 0 | 1 |
| 12 | 13 | DF | (Brazil) | Wallace | 1 | 0 | 1 |
| 12 | 18 | FW | (Spain) | Luis Alberto | 1 | 0 | 1 |
| 12 | 25 | FW | (Italy) | Cristiano Lombardi | 1 | 0 | 1 |
| Own goal | | | | | 1 | 0 | 1 |
| Totals | | | | | 74 | 10 | 84 |

Last updated: 28 May 2017

=== Clean sheets ===
| Rank | No. | Pos | Nat | Name | Serie A | Coppa Italia | Total |
|---|---|---|---|---|---|---|---|
| 1 | 1 | GK | (Albania) | Thomas Strakosha | 6 | 1 | 7 |
| 2 | 22 | GK | (Italy) | Federico Marchetti | 2 | 0 | 2 |
| Totals | | | | | 8 | 1 | 9 |

Last updated: 28 May 2017

=== Disciplinary record ===
| No. | Pos | Nat | Player | Serie A | | | Coppa Italia | | | Total | | |
| No. | Pos | Nat | Player | Booked | (yellow card) (yellow-red card) | Sent off (straight red) | Booked | (yellow card) (yellow-red card) | Sent off (straight red) | Booked | (yellow card) (yellow-red card) | Sent off (straight red) |
| 1 | GK | (Albania) | Thomas Strakosha | 1 | 0 | 0 | 1 | 0 | 0 | 2 | 0 | 0 |
| 22 | GK | (Italy) | Federico Marchetti | 0 | 0 | 0 | 0 | 0 | 0 | 0 | 0 | 0 |
| 55 | GK | (Croatia) | Ivan Vargić | 0 | 0 | 0 | 0 | 0 | 0 | 0 | 0 | 0 |
| 2 | DF | (Netherlands) | Wesley Hoedt | 5 | 0 | 0 | 1 | 0 | 0 | 6 | 0 | 0 |
| 3 | DF | (Netherlands) | Stefan de Vrij | 3 | 0 | 0 | 0 | 0 | 0 | 3 | 0 | 0 |
| 4 | DF | (Spain) | Patric | 4 | 0 | 0 | 2 | 0 | 0 | 6 | 0 | 0 |
| 6 | DF | (Belgium) | Jordan Lukaku | 2 | 0 | 0 | 1 | 0 | 0 | 3 | 0 | 0 |
| 8 | DF | (Serbia) | Dušan Basta | 2 | 0 | 0 | 0 | 0 | 0 | 2 | 0 | 0 |
| 13 | DF | (Brazil) | Wallace | 3 | 0 | 0 | 0 | 0 | 0 | 3 | 0 | 0 |
| 15 | DF | (Angola) | Bastos | 4 | 1 | 0 | 0 | 0 | 0 | 4 | 1 | 0 |
| 26 | DF | (Romania) | Ștefan Radu | 10 | 0 | 0 | 0 | 1 | 0 | 10 | 1 | 0 |
| 5 | MF | (Italy) | Danilo Cataldi | 3 | 0 | 1 | 0 | 0 | 0 | 3 | 0 | 1 |
| 10 | MF | (Brazil) | Felipe Anderson | 5 | 0 | 0 | 1 | 0 | 0 | 6 | 0 | 0 |
| 11 | MF | (Italy) | Luca Crecco | 0 | 0 | 0 | 0 | 0 | 0 | 0 | 0 | 0 |
| 16 | MF | (Italy) | Marco Parolo | 11 | 0 | 0 | 2 | 0 | 0 | 13 | 0 | 0 |
| 18 | MF | (Spain) | Luis Alberto | 0 | 0 | 0 | 0 | 0 | 0 | 0 | 0 | 0 |
| 19 | MF | (Bosnia and Herzegovina) | Senad Lulić | 7 | 1 | 0 | 2 | 0 | 0 | 9 | 1 | 0 |
| 20 | MF | (Argentina) | Lucas Biglia | 8 | 0 | 0 | 0 | 0 | 0 | 8 | 0 | 0 |
| 21 | MF | (Serbia) | Sergej Milinković-Savić | 8 | 0 | 0 | 0 | 0 | 0 | 8 | 0 | 0 |
| 96 | MF | (Italy) | Alessandro Murgia | 1 | 0 | 0 | 0 | 0 | 0 | 1 | 0 | 0 |
| 9 | FW | (Serbia) | Filip Đorđević | 0 | 0 | 0 | 0 | 0 | 0 | 0 | 0 | 0 |
| 14 | FW | (Senegal) | Keita Baldé | 4 | 1 | 0 | 0 | 0 | 0 | 4 | 1 | 0 |
| 17 | FW | (Italy) | Ciro Immobile | 5 | 0 | 0 | 0 | 0 | 0 | 5 | 0 | 0 |
| 25 | FW | (Italy) | Cristiano Lombardi | 4 | 0 | 0 | 0 | 0 | 0 | 4 | 0 | 0 |
| 43 | FW | (Italy) | Giorgio Spizzichino | 0 | 0 | 0 | 0 | 0 | 0 | 0 | 0 | 0 |
| 71 | FW | (Spain) | Mamadou Tounkara | 0 | 0 | 0 | 0 | 0 | 0 | 0 | 0 | 0 |
| 97 | FW | (Italy) | Alessandro Rossi | 0 | 0 | 0 | 0 | 0 | 0 | 0 | 0 | 0 |
| Totals | | | | 90 | 3 | 1 | 10 | 1 | 0 | 100 | 4 | 1 |

Last updated: 28 May 2017
