= Wallace (footballer, born October 1994) =

Brazilian association football player

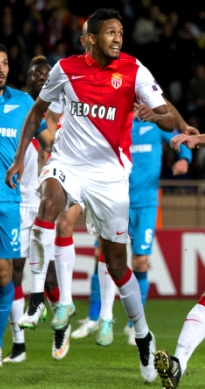
- Wallace playing for Monaco in 2014

Personal information
- Full name: Wallace Fortuna dos Santos
- Date of birth: 14 October 1994 (age 32)
- Place of birth: Rio de Janeiro, Brazil
- Height: 1.91 m (6 ft 3 in)
- Position: Centre-back

Team information
- Current team: Botafogo-SP
- Number: 13

Youth career
- Tigres do Brasil
- 2010–2013: Cruzeiro

Senior career*
Years	Team	Apps	(Gls)
2013–2014	Cruzeiro	3	(0)
2014–2016	Braga	0	(0)
2014–2016	→ Monaco (loan)	40	(1)
2016–2020	Lazio	54	(1)
2019–2020	→ Braga (loan)	8	(0)
2020–2022	Yeni Malatyaspor	46	(0)
2022–2023	Wuhan Three Towns	33	(1)
2023–2024	Ittihad Kalba	11	(0)
2025	Atlético Goianiense	9	(0)
2026–	Botafogo-SP	17	(0)

International career^{‡}
2013–2014	Brazil U20	6	(1)
2014–2016	Brazil U23	3	(0)
- * Club domestic league appearances and goals as of 18 November 2026 ‡ National team caps and goals as of 15 November 2014

Wallace Fortuna dos Santos (born 14 October 1994), known as simply Wallace, is a Brazilian professional footballer who plays as a centre-back for Botafogo-SP.

== Club career ==
A youth product of Cruzeiro, Wallace caused a great stir when football agent Jorge Mendes's Gestifute paid €9.5 million to sign him from Cruzeiro in early July 2014. However, as his registration rights as a footballer must owned by a football club, Wallace was "signed" by S.C. Braga which owned 10% economic rights (for the future transfer fee), with a release clause at €40 million.

On 21 August 2014, without ever playing for Braga, he was loaned to AS Monaco, in a loan deal set by Jorge Mendes.

On 29 July 2016, Serie A club Lazio announced that they had definitively purchased Wallace from Braga for €8 million. He scored his first goal for the club on 20 November 2016 in a 3–1 home win over Genoa.

On 30 September 2020, Wallace joined Turkish Süper Lig club Yeni Malatyaspor. On 26 January 2022, his contract with Yeni Malatyaspor was terminated by mutual consent.

On 15 February 2022, Wallace joined Chinese Super League club Wuhan Three Towns. Throughout the season he would be part of the squad that won the 2022 Chinese Super League title.

On 20 September 2023, Wallace joined UAE Pro League club Ittihad Kalba.

== International career ==
Wallace represented the Brazil U-20 at the 2013 and 2014 editions of the Toulon Tournament.

== Career statistics ==
=== Club ===
As of match played 26 October 2025

Appearances and goals by club, season and competition
Club	Season	League			Cup		League cup		Continental (Note: Appearances in UEFA Champions League and UEFA Europa League)		Other		Total	
Club	Season	Division	Apps	Goals	Apps	Goals	Apps	Goals	Apps	Goals	Apps	Goals	Apps	Goals
Cruzeiro	2013	Série A	0	0	1	0	—		—		—		1	0
Cruzeiro	2014	Série A	3	0	0	0	—		—		4 (Note: Appearances in the Campeonato Mineiro)	0	7	0
Cruzeiro	Total		3	0	1	0	—		—		4	0	8	0
Braga	2014–15	Primeira Liga	0	0	—		—		—		—		0	0
Monaco (loan)	2014–15	Ligue 1	14	0	2	1	2	0	4	0	—		22	1
Monaco (loan)	2015–16	Ligue 1	26	1	2	0	1	0	5	0	—		34	1
Monaco (loan)	Total		40	1	4	1	3	0	9	0	—		56	2
Lazio	2016–17	Serie A	25	1	5	0	—		—		—		30	1
Lazio	2017–18	Serie A	13	0	1	0	—		2	0	1 (Note: Appearance in the Supercoppa Italiana)	0	17	0
Lazio	2018–19	Serie A	16	0	1	0	—		3	1	—		20	1
Lazio	Total		54	1	7	0	—		5	1	1	0	67	2
Braga (loan)	2019–20	Primeira Liga	8	0	3	0	2	0	3	0	—		16	0
Yeni Malatyaspor	2020–21	Süper Lig	28	0	3	0	—		—		—		31	0
Yeni Malatyaspor	2021–22	Süper Lig	18	0	0	0	—		—		—		18	0
Yeni Malatyaspor	Total		46	0	3	0	—		—		—		49	0
Wuhan Three Towns	2022	Chinese Super League	20	1	0	0	—		—		—		20	1
Wuhan Three Towns	2023	Chinese Super League	13	0	1	0	—		—		1 (Note: Appearance in the Chinese FA Super Cup)	0	15	0
Wuhan Three Towns	Total		33	1	1	0	—		—		1	0	35	1
Ittihad Kalba	2023–24	UAE Pro League	11	0	1	0	3	0	—		—		15	0
Atlético Goianiense	2025	Série B	9	0	—		—		—		—		9	0
Career total			204	3	20	1	9	0	17	1	6	0	256	5

== Honours ==
Cruzeiro

- Campeonato Brasileiro Série A: 2013
- Campeonato Mineiro: 2014

Lazio

- Coppa Italia: 2018–19
- Supercoppa Italiana: 2017

Wuhan Three Towns

- Chinese Super League: 2022
- Chinese FA Super Cup: 2023

Brazil U20

- Toulon Tournament: 2013, 2014
