= Cristiano Lombardi =

Italian footballer (born 1995)

Personal information
- Date of birth: 19 August 1995 (age 31)
- Place of birth: Viterbo, Italy
- Height: 1.80 m (5 ft 11 in)
- Position: Right winger

Team information
- Current team: Lazio (U18 assistant coach)

Youth career
- 2011–2014: Lazio

Senior career*
Years	Team	Apps	(Gls)
2013–2024	Lazio	18	(4)
2014–2015	→ Trapani (loan)	12	(0)
2015–2016	→ Ancona (loan)	25	(4)
2017–2018	→ Benevento (loan)	16	(0)
2019	→ Venezia (loan)	11	(0)
2019–2021	→ Salernitana (loan)	24	(5)
2022	→ Reggina (loan)	8	(1)
2022–2023	→ Triestina (loan)	4	(0)

International career
2012–2013	Italy U18	3	(3)
2013	Italy U19	2	(0)

Managerial career
- 2024–: Lazio (U18 assistant)
- * Club domestic league appearances and goals

Cristiano Lombardi (born 19 August 1995) is an Italian football coach and a former right winger. He is an assistant coach with the Under-18 squad of Lazio.

== Club career ==
Product of Lazio youth system, in the 2014–2015 season he was sent on loan to Serie B club Trapani, where he played 12 appearances. In the 2015–2016 season he was sent on loan to Lega Pro club Ancona, where he played 12 appearances and scoring 4 goals.

He made his return in Lazio's first team for the 2016–17 season, making his Serie A debut on 22 August 2016, in the match win 4–3 against Atalanta at Stadio Atleti Azzurri d'Italia, where he scored his debut goal.

On 31 August 2017, Lombardi was loaned to Serie A newcomers Benevento on a season-long deal.

On 15 January 2019, Lombardo joined on loan to Venezia until 30 June 2020.

On 17 July 2019, Lombardi joined Salernitana on loan until 30 June 2020.

On 31 January 2022, Lombardi was loaned to Reggina.

On 3 August 2022, Lombardi moved on loan to Triestina, with Triestina holding an obligation to purchase his rights in case of their promotion to Serie B.

In September 2024, Lombardi announced retirement from playing and that he was hired to work as a coach with the junior squads of Lazio.

== Career statistics ==
=== Club ===
As of 20 May 2018

Club	Season	League		Cup		Europe		Other		Total	
Club	Season	Apps	Goals	Apps	Goals	Apps	Goals	Apps	Goals	Apps	Goals
Lazio
Lazio	2016–17	18	1	0	0	—		—		18	1
Lazio	Total	18	1	0	0	0	0	0	0	18	1
Trapani (loan)	2014–15	12	0	0	0	—		—		12	0
Ancona (loan)	2015–16	25	4	0	0	—		—		25	4
Benevento (loan)	2017–18	16	0	0	0	0	0	0	0	16	0
Career Total		71	5	0	0	0	0	0	0	71	5
