= Luca Crecco =

Italian footballer

Personal information
- Date of birth: 6 September 1995 (age 31)
- Place of birth: Rome, Italy
- Height: 1.87 m (6 ft 2 in)
- Position: Left winger

Team information
- Current team: Sorrento
- Number: 3

Youth career
- –2013: Lazio

Senior career*
Years	Team	Apps	(Gls)
2013–2018	Lazio	5	(1)
2014–2015	→ Ternana (loan)	34	(0)
2015–2016	→ Virtus Lanciano (loan)	10	(0)
2016	→ Modena (loan)	15	(0)
2016	→ Trapani (loan)	0	(0)
2016–2017	→ Avellino (loan)	12	(0)
2018–2023	Pescara	58	(4)
2021	→ Cosenza (loan)	16	(1)
2021–2022	→ Vicenza (loan)	31	(1)
2023–2024	Taranto	8	(0)
2023–2024	→ Latina (loan)	35	(2)
2024–2025	Latina	25	(3)
2025–	Sorrento	34	(4)

International career
2012–2013	Italy U18	9	(0)
2013–2014	Italy U19	7	(3)
2014–2015	Italy U20	4	(0)
- * Club domestic league appearances and goals as of 1 May 2026

Luca Crecco (born 6 September 1995) is an Italian professional footballer who plays as a left-winger for Serie C Group C club Sorrento.

== Club career ==
Crecco scored his first professional career goal with Lazio on 23 April 2017, in a 6–2 home win over Palermo.

On 7 August 2018, Crecco signed for Serie B club Pescara. On 29 January 2021, he was loaned to Cosenza. On 15 July 2021, Crecco joined Vicenza on loan with an option to buy.

On 24 January 2023, he signed a three-year contract with Taranto.

On 17 August 2023, Crecco signed for Latina on loan for the season.

On 13 August 2024, Crecco signed for Latina, this time permanently.

== Career statistics ==
=== Club ===
As of match played 12 March 2022

Appearances and goals by club, season and competition
Club	Season	League			National Cup		Continental		Other		Total	
Club	Season	Division	Apps	Goals	Apps	Goals	Apps	Goals	Apps	Goals	Apps	Goals
Lazio	2012–13	Serie A	1	0	0	0	—		—		1	0
Lazio	2013–14	Serie A	1	0	0	0	—		—		1	0
Lazio	2016–17	Serie A	3	1	1	0	—		—		4	1
Lazio	2017–18	Serie A	0	0	0	0	2 (Note: Appearance(s) in UEFA Europa League)	0	—		2	0
Lazio	Total		5	1	1	0	2	0	0	0	8	1
Ternana (loan)	2014–15	Serie B	34	0	1	0	—		—		35	0
Virtus Lanciano (loan)	2015–16	Serie B	10	0	1	0	—		—		11	0
Modena (loan)	2015–16	Serie B	15	0	0	0	—		—		15	0
Trapani (loan)	2016–17	Serie B	0	0	0	0	—		—		0	0
Avellino (loan)	2016–17	Serie B	12	0	0	0	—		—		12	0
Pescara	2018–19	Serie B	21	2	0	0	—		2 (Note: Appearance(s) in Promotion Playoffs)	0	23	2
Pescara	2019–20	Serie B	22	1	0	0	—		1 (Note: Appearance(s) in Relegation Playoffs)	0	23	1
Pescara	2020–21	Serie B	10	0	0	0	—		—		10	0
Pescara	Total		53	3	0	0	0	0	3	0	56	3
Cosenza (loan)	2020–21	Serie B	16	1	0	0	—		—		16	1
Vicenza (loan)	2021–22	Serie B	25	1	1	0	—		—		26	1
Pescara	2022–23	Serie C	5	1	0	0	—		—		5	1
Taranto	2022–23	Serie C	8	0	0	0	—		—		8	0
Latina (loan)	2023–24	Serie C	33	2	1	0	—		1	0	35	2
Career total			216	9	5	0	2	0	3	0	226	9
