= 2013–14 SS Lazio season =

Lazio
2013–14 season
- Chairman: Claudio Lotito
- Manager: Vladimir Petković (until 4 January 2014); Edoardo Reja (from 4 January 2014)
- Stadium: Stadio Olimpico
- Serie A: 9th
- Coppa Italia: Quarter-finals
- UEFA Europa League: Round of 32
- Top goalscorer: League: Antonio Candreva (12); All: Antonio Candreva (12)
- Highest home attendance: 36,585 vs Cagliari
- Lowest home attendance: 24,858 vs Udinese
- Average home league attendance: 30,084
Home colours	Away colours	Third colours

The 2013–14 season was the 114th season in Società Sportiva Lazio's history and their club's 26th consecutive season in the top-flight of Italian football. The club competed in Serie A, the Coppa Italia, and the UEFA Europa League.

== Players ==
=== Squad information ===
As of 6 April 2014.

Note: Flags indicate national team as defined under FIFA eligibility rules; some limited exceptions apply. Players may hold more than one non-FIFA nationality.

No.	Pos.	Nation	Player
1	GK	ALB	Etrit Berisha
2	DF	FRA	Michaël Ciani
3	DF	BRA	André Dias
4	MF	ITA	Luca Crecco
5	MF	ARG	Lucas Biglia
6	MF	ITA	Stefano Mauri (captain)
7	MF	BRA	Felipe Anderson
10	MF	BRA	Ederson
11	FW	GER	Miroslav Klose
14	FW	ESP	Keita Baldé
15	MF	URU	Álvaro González
17	MF	POR	Bruno Pereirinha
19	MF	BIH	Senad Lulić
20	DF	ITA	Giuseppe Biava
21	MF	FRA	Gaël Kakuta (on loan from Chelsea)
22	GK	ITA	Federico Marchetti
23	MF	NGR	Ogenyi Onazi

No.	Pos.	Nation	Player
24	MF	ITA	Cristian Ledesma (vice-captain)
25	DF	ITA	Riccardo Serpieri
26	DF	ROU	Ștefan Radu (vice-captain)
27	DF	ALB	Lorik Cana
29	DF	FRA	Abdoulay Konko
30	FW	URU	Emiliano Alfaro
34	FW	COL	Brayan Perea
39	DF	BEL	Luis Pedro Cavanda
46	FW	POR	Hélder Postiga (on loan from Valencia)
55	GK	ITA	Guido Guerrieri
58	MF	CMR	Joseph Minala
85	DF	ARG	Diego Novaretti
87	MF	ITA	Antonio Candreva (co-owned by Udinese)
95	GK	ALB	Thomas Strakosha

=== Out on loan ===
Note: Flags indicate national team as defined under FIFA eligibility rules; some limited exceptions apply. Players may hold more than one non-FIFA nationality.

No.	Pos.	Nation	Player
9	FW	ITA	Antonio Rozzi (at (Spain) Real Madrid Castilla)
16	MF	ITA	Danilo Cataldi (at Crotone)
28	DF	BRA	Vinícius Freitas (at Padova)
—	GK	ITA	Alessandro Berardi (at Salernitana)
—	DF	NGR	Seyi Adeleke (at (Switzerland) Biel-Bienne)
—	DF	ITA	Giuseppe Capua (at Salernitana)
—	DF	ITA	Luca Crescenzi (at Pisa)
—	DF	ITA	Alessio Luciani (at Salernitana)

No.	Pos.	Nation	Player
—	DF	ITA	Andrea Sbraga (at Carrarese)
—	DF	LTU	Aurimas Vilkaitis (at Nocerina)
—	MF	ITA	Alberto De Francesco (at Ischia)
—	MF	ITA	Gianmarco Falasca (at Cuneo)
—	MF	ITA	Riccardo Perpetuini (at Salernitana)
—	FW	ITA	Ettore Mendicino (at Salernitana)
—	FW	ITA	Giuseppe Sculli (at Genoa)

=== Co-owned with other clubs ===
Note: Flags indicate national team as defined under FIFA eligibility rules; some limited exceptions apply. Players may hold more than one non-FIFA nationality.

No.	Pos.	Nation	Player
—	DF	ITA	Alessandro Tuia (with Salernitana)
—	MF	ITA	Enrico Zampa (with Salernitana)
—	FW	NGR	Sani Emmanuel (with Salernitana)

=== Reserves ===
Note: Flags indicate national team as defined under FIFA eligibility rules; some limited exceptions apply. Players may hold more than one non-FIFA nationality.

No.	Pos.	Nation	Player
16	DF	CRO	Josip Elez
45	FW	SEN	Mamadou Tounkara

No.	Pos.	Nation	Player
94	MF	SRB	Miloš Antić

== Pre-season and friendlies ==
16 July 2013	Lazio	11–0	C.S. Auronzo	Auronzo di Cadore
17:00 CEST (UTC+02:00)	Kozák 6', 36'; Keita 27'; Tounkara 39', 40'; Mauri 49' (pen.), 62'; Klose 51', 79'; Ederson 53'; Stankevičius 77'	Report		Referee: Stefano Lorenzin

20 July 2013	Lazio	4–1	Brasile Soccer Team	Auronzo di Cadore
17:00 CEST (UTC+02:00)	Ederson 13', 55'; Keita 50'; Cana 67'	Report	Fabbris 49'	Referee: Nicolò Sprezzola

21 July 2013	Lazio	8–0	Top 11 Radioclub (103)	Auronzo di Cadore
17:00 CEST (UTC+02:00)	Lulić 11'; Rozzi 19', 35'; Klose 22', 66'; Ederson 73'; Floccari 74'; Keita 89'	Report		Referee: Matteo Perissinotto

24 July 2013	Lazio	3–0	Spezia	Auronzo di Cadore
17:00 CEST (UTC+02:00)	Ederson 40'; Rozzi 54', 79'	Report		Referee: Simone Aversano

30 July 2013	Siena	1–0	Lazio	Siena
20:30 CEST (UTC+02:00)	Giannetti 20'	Report		Stadium: Artemio Franchi; Referee: Riccardo Pinzani

31 July 2013	Nice	0–1	Lazio	Nice
20:00 CEST (UTC+02:00)		Report	Klose 19'	Stadium: Stade du Ray; Referee: Castro

4 August 2013	Panathinaikos	0–0	Lazio	Athens
20:00 CEST (UTC+02:00)		Report		Stadium: Leoforos Alexandras Stadium; Referee: Andreas Pappas

10 August 2013	Crystal Palace	0–1	Lazio	London
15:00 BST		Report	Klose 12'	Stadium: Selhurst Park; Referee: Phil Dowd

== Competitions ==
=== Supercoppa Italiana ===
Lazio, as holders of the Coppa Italia trophy faced Juventus, the 2012–13 Serie A champions.

18 August 2013	Juventus	4–0	Lazio	Rome
21:00 CEST (UTC+02:00)	Pogba 23'; Chiellini 52'; Lichtsteiner 54'; Tevez 56'			Stadium: Stadio Olimpico; Attendance: 57,000; Referee: Gianluca Rocchi

=== Serie A ===
==== League table ====
Pos	Team	Pld	W	D	L	GF	GA	GD	Pts	Qualification or relegation
7	Torino	38	15	12	11	58	48	+10	57 (Note: Torino finished ahead of Milan on goal difference : Torino 2-2 Milan, Milan 1-1 Torino; Torino = +10, Milan = +8.)	Qualification for the Europa League third qualifying round (Note: The FIGC rejected the application of Parma for a UEFA licence, because Parma had overdue tax debt; their place went to seventh-place Torino, which had a UEFA licence.)
8	Milan	38	16	9	13	57	49	+8	57	
9	Lazio	38	15	11	12	54	54	0	56	
10	Hellas Verona	38	16	6	16	62	68	−6	54	
11	Atalanta	38	15	5	18	43	51	−8	50	

Source: Serie A, Soccerway
Rules for classification: 1st points; 2nd head-to-head points; 3rd head-to-head goal difference; 4th goal difference; 5th number of goals scored; 6th public draw.
(Head-to-head record is applied for clubs with the same number of points only once all matches between said clubs have been played)

==== Results summary ====
Overall								Home						Away					
Pld	W	D	L	GF	GA	GD	Pts	W	D	L	GF	GA	GD	W	D	L	GF	GA	GD
38	15	11	12	54	54	0	56	10	6	3	32	19	+13	5	5	9	22	35	−13

Last updated: 18 May 2014.
Source: Competitive matches

==== Results by round ====
Round	1	2	3	4	5	6	7	8	9	10	11	12	13	14	15	16	17	18	19	20	21	22	23	24	25	26	27	28	29	30	31	32	33	34	35	36	37	38
Ground	H	A	H	A	H	A	H	A	H	A	H	A	A	H	A	H	A	H	A	A	H	A	H	A	H	A	H	A	H	A	H	H	A	H	A	H	A	H
Result	W	L	W	L	W	D	D	L	W	D	L	D	D	L	L	W	L	W	D	W	D	W	D	L	W	W	L	W	D	L	W	W	L	D	W	D	L	W
Position	8	12	7	8	6	6	7	9	7	7	7	8	8	9	12	8	10	10	9	9	9	9	9	9	9	9	9	9	9	9	9	9	9	9	9	9	9	9

Updated to match(es) played on 18 May 2014. Source: Competitive matches
A = Away; H = Home; W = Win; D = Draw; L = Loss

==== Matches ====
25 August 2013 1	Lazio	2–1	Udinese	Rome
20:45 CEST (UTC+02:00)	Hernanes 13'; Candreva 16' (pen.)		Muriel 60'	Stadium: Stadio Olimpico; Attendance: 24,858; Referee: Andrea Gervasoni

31 August 2013 2	Juventus	4–1	Lazio	Turin
20:45 CEST (UTC+02:00)	Vidal 14', 26'; Vučinić 49'; Tevez 80'		Klose 28'	Stadium: Juventus Stadium; Attendance: 38,041; Referee: Paolo Tagliavento

15 September 2013 3	Lazio	3–0	Chievo	Rome
15:00 CEST (UTC+02:00)	Candreva 8'; Cavanda 38'; Lulić 41'			Stadium: Stadio Olimpico; Attendance: 30,000; Referee: Gianpaolo Calvarese

22 September 2013 4	Roma	2–0	Lazio	Rome
15:00 CEST (UTC+02:00)	Balzaretti 63'; Ljajić 90+4' (pen.)			Stadium: Stadio Olimpico; Attendance: 45,306; Referee: Gianluca Rocchi

25 September 2013 5	Lazio	3–1	Catania	Rome
20:45 CEST (UTC+02:00)	Ederson 4'; Lulić 39'; Hernanes 90+4'		Barrientos 6'	Stadium: Stadio Olimpico; Attendance: 27,140; Referee: Massimiliano Irrati

29 September 2013 6	Sassuolo	2–2	Lazio	Reggio Emilia
15:00 CEST (UTC+02:00)	Schelotto 55'; Floro Flores 76'		Dias 50'; Candreva 54'	Stadium: Mapei Stadium – Città del Tricolore; Attendance: 10,687; Referee: Luca Banti

6 October 2013 7	Lazio	0–0	Fiorentina	Rome
20:45 CEST (UTC+02:00)				Stadium: Stadio Olimpico; Attendance: 30,562; Referee: Daniele Orsato

20 October 2013 8	Atalanta	2–1	Lazio	Bergamo
12:30 CEST (UTC+02:00)	Cigarini 41'; Denis 84'		Perea 53'	Stadium: Stadio Atleti Azzurri d'Italia; Attendance: 12,127; Referee: Carmine Russo

27 October 2013 9	Lazio	2–0	Cagliari	Rome
20:45 CET (UTC+01:00)	Klose 52'; Candreva 55' (pen.)			Stadium: Stadio Olimpico; Attendance: 36,585; Referee: Davide Massa

30 October 2013 10	Milan	1–1	Lazio	Milan
20:45 CET (UTC+01:00)	Kaká 54'		Ciani 72'	Stadium: San Siro; Attendance: 30,212; Referee: Antonio Damato

3 November 2013 11	Lazio	0–2	Genoa	Rome
15:00 CET (UTC+01:00)			Kucka 60'; Gilardino 72' (pen.)	Stadium: Stadio Olimpico; Attendance: 33,919; Referee: Dino Tommasi

10 November 2013 12	Parma	1–1	Lazio	Parma
15:00 CET (UTC+01:00)	Lucarelli 64'		Keita 50'	Stadium: Stadio Ennio Tardini; Attendance: 11,139; Referee: Nicola Rizzoli

24 November 2013 13	Sampdoria	1–1	Lazio	Genoa
15:00 CET (UTC+01:00)	Soriano 67'		Cana 90+4'	Stadium: Stadio Luigi Ferraris; Attendance: 20,352; Referee: Daniele Orsato

2 December 2013 14	Lazio	2–4	Napoli	Rome
21:00 CET (UTC+01:00)	Behrami 25' (o.g.); Keita 88'		Higuaín 24', 72'; Pandev 50'; Callejón 90+1'	Stadium: Stadio Olimpico; Attendance: 38,112; Referee: Mauro Bergonzi

8 December 2013 15	Torino	1–0	Lazio	Turin
15:00 CET (UTC+01:00)	Glik 19'			Stadium: Stadio Olimpico di Torino; Attendance: 14,166; Referee: Paolo Tagliavento

15 December 2013 16	Lazio	2–0	Livorno	Rome
15:00 CET (UTC+01:00)	Klose 19', 26'			Stadium: Stadio Olimpico; Attendance: 27,605; Referee: Sebastiano Peruzzo

22 December 2013 17	Hellas Verona	4–1	Lazio	Verona
15:00 CET (UTC+01:00)	Toni 5', 78'; Iturbe 44'; Rômulo 63'		Biglia 27'	Stadium: Stadio Marc'Antonio Bentegodi; Attendance: 19,300; Referee: Gianpaolo Calvarese

6 January 2014 18	Lazio	1–0	Internazionale	Rome
18:30 CET (UTC+01:00)	Klose 81'			Stadium: Stadio Olimpico; Attendance: 35,000; Referee: Antonio Damato

12 January 2014 19	Bologna	0–0	Lazio	Bologna
20:45 CET (UTC+01:00)				Stadium: Stadio Renato Dall'Ara; Attendance: 16,243; Referee: Domenico Celi

19 January 2014 20	Udinese	2–3	Lazio	Udine
12:30 CET (UTC+01:00)	Di Natale 8' (pen.); Agyemang-Badu 68'		Candreva 62' (pen.); Lazzari 82' (o.g.); Hernanes 90'	Stadium: Stadio Friuli; Attendance: 12,685; Referee: Gianluca Rocchi

26 January 2014 21	Lazio	1–1	Juventus	Rome
20:45 CET (UTC+01:00)	Candreva 24' (pen.)		Llorente 60'	Stadium: Stadio Olimpico; Attendance: 44,018; Referee: Davide Massa

2 February 2014 22	Chievo	0–2	Lazio	Verona
15:00 CET (UTC+01:00)			Candreva 6'; Keita 70'	Stadium: Stadio Marc'Antonio Bentegodi; Attendance: 5,000; Referee: Carmine Russo

9 February 2014 23	Lazio	0–0	Roma	Rome
15:00 CET (UTC+01:00)				Stadium: Stadio Olimpico; Attendance: 49,236; Referee: Daniele Orsato

16 February 2014 24	Catania	3–1	Lazio	Catania
12:30 CET (UTC+01:00)	Izco 1'; Spolli 48'; Peruzzi 58'		Mauri 45+1'	Stadium: Stadio Angelo Massimino; Attendance: 12,487; Referee: Paolo Mazzoleni

23 February 2014 25	Lazio	3–2	Sassuolo	Rome
20:45 CET (UTC+01:00)	Radu 36'; Klose 73'; Cannavaro 83' (o.g.)		Floccari 72'; Floro Flores 79'	Stadium: Stadio Olimpico; Attendance: 40,098; Referee: Piero Giacomelli

2 March 2014 26	Fiorentina	0–1	Lazio	Florence
20:45 CET (UTC+01:00)			Cana 5'	Stadium: Stadio Artemio Franchi; Attendance: 28,488; Referee: Luca Banti

9 March 2014 27	Lazio	0–1	Atalanta	Rome
15:00 CET (UTC+01:00)			Moralez 60'	Stadium: Stadio Olimpico; Attendance: 25,587; Referee: Sebastiano Peruzzo

16 March 2014 28	Cagliari	0–2	Lazio	Trieste
15:00 CET (UTC+01:00)			Lulić 19'; Keita 69'	Stadium: Stadio Nereo Rocco; Attendance: 4,798; Referee: Massimiliano Irrati

23 March 2014 29	Lazio	1–1	Milan	Rome
20:45 CET (UTC+01:00)	González 61'		Konko 43' (o.g.)	Stadium: Stadio Olimpico; Attendance: 27,800; Referee: Gianluca Rocchi

26 March 2014 30	Genoa	2–0	Lazio	Genoa
20:45 CET (UTC+01:00)	Gilardino 65'; Fetfatzidis 83'			Stadium: Stadio Luigi Ferraris; Attendance: 17,875; Referee: Sebastiano Peruzzo

30 March 2014 31	Lazio	3–2	Parma	Rome
15:00 CEST (UTC+02:00)	Lulić 15'; Klose 67'; Candreva 90+3'		Biabiany 26'; Ciani 81' (o.g.)	Stadium: Stadio Olimpico; Attendance: 26,531; Referee: Antonio Damato

6 April 2014 32	Lazio	2–0	Sampdoria	Rome
12:30 CEST (UTC+02:00)	Candreva 42'; Lulić 73'			Stadium: Stadio Olimpico; Attendance: 27,319; Referee: Gianpaolo Calvarese

13 April 2014 33	Napoli	4–2	Lazio	Naples
15:00 CEST (UTC+02:00)	Mertens 41'; Higuaín 49' (pen.), 67', 90+4'		Lulić 21'; Onazi 82'	Stadium: Stadio San Paolo; Attendance: 39,987; Referee: Luca Banti

19 April 2014 34	Lazio	3–3	Torino	Rome
15:00 CEST (UTC+02:00)	Mauri 42'; Candreva 61' (pen.), 90+4'		Kurtić 52'; Tachtsidis 67'; Immobile 89'	Stadium: Stadio Olimpico; Attendance: 29,142; Referee: Marco Guida

27 April 2014 35	Livorno	0–2	Lazio	Livorno
15:00 CEST (UTC+02:00)			Mauri 15'; Candreva 51' (pen.)	Stadium: Stadio Armando Picchi; Attendance: 8,608; Referee: Andrea De Marco

4 May 2014 36	Lazio	3–3	Hellas Verona	Rome
19:00 CEST (UTC+02:00)	Keita 30'; Lulić 60'; Mauri 90+3'		Marquinho 37'; Iturbe 69'; Rômulo 83'	Stadium: Stadio Olimpico; Attendance: 27,924; Referee: Paolo Mazzoleni

11 May 2014 37	Internazionale	4–1	Lazio	Milan
20:45 CEST (UTC+02:00)	Palacio 7', 37'; Icardi 34'; Hernanes 79'		Biava 2'	Stadium: San Siro; Attendance: 64,718; Referee: Davide Massa

18 May 2014 38	Lazio	1–0	Bologna	Rome
20:45 CEST (UTC+02:00)	Biglia 90+4' (pen.)			Stadium: Stadio Olimpico; Attendance: 26,752; Referee: Fabio Maresca

=== Coppa Italia ===
By finishing in the top 8 places in the 2012–13 Serie A, Lazio qualified directly to the Round of 16.

14 January 2014 Round of 16	Lazio	2–1	Parma	Rome
21:00 CET (UTC+01:00)	Biglia (yellow card) 31'; Perea 25', 90+1', (yellow card) 89'		Biabiany 43'; Felipe (yellow card) 45+1'; Cassani (yellow card) 89'	Stadium: Stadio Olimpico; Attendance: 6,667; Referee: Andrea Gervasoni

29 January 2014 Quarter-finals	Napoli	1–0	Lazio	Naples
20:45 CET (UTC+01:00)	Jorginho (yellow card) 15'; Higuaín 82', (yellow card) 84'		Lulić (yellow card) 88'	Stadium: Stadio San Paolo; Attendance: 42,131; Referee: Luca Banti

=== UEFA Europa League ===
==== Group stage ====
Pos	Team	Pld	W	D	L	GF	GA	GD	Pts	Qualification	TRA	LAZ	APO	LEG
1	(Turkey) Trabzonspor	6	4	2	0	13	6	+7	14	Advance to knockout phase	—	3–3	4–2	2–0
2	(Italy) Lazio	6	3	3	0	8	4	+4	12	Advance to knockout phase	0–0	—	2–1	1–0
3	(Cyprus) Apollon Limassol	6	1	1	4	5	10	−5	4		1–2	0–0	—	0–2
4	(Poland) Legia Warsaw	6	1	0	5	2	8	−6	3		0–2	0–2	0–1	—

Source: Soccerway

19 September 2013 1	Lazio (Italy)	1–0	(Poland) Legia Warsaw	Rome, Italy
21:05 CEST (UTC+02:00)	Ederson (yellow card) 30'; Hernanes 53'; Ciani (yellow card) 65'	Report		Stadium: Stadio Olimpico; Attendance: 11,769; Referee: Kristinn Jakobsson (Iceland)

3 October 2013 2	Trabzonspor (Turkey)	3–3	(Italy) Lazio	Trabzon, Turkey
19:00 CEST (UTC+02:00)	Erdoğan 12'; Mierzejewski 22'; Paulo Henrique 35'	Report	Onazi 29'; Cavanda (yellow card) 74'; Floccari 84', 85'	Stadium: Hüseyin Avni Aker Stadium; Attendance: 13,002; Referee: Martin Hansson (Sweden)

24 October 2013 3	Apollon Limassol (Cyprus)	0–0	(Italy) Lazio	Nicosia, Cyprus
19:00 CEST (UTC+02:00)	Stylianou (yellow card) 54'; Karipidis (yellow card) 61'	Report	González (yellow card) 50'; Ledesma (yellow card) 90+4'	Stadium: GSP Stadium; Attendance: 8,943; Referee: Jorge Sousa (Portugal)

7 November 2013 4	Lazio (Italy)	2–1	(Cyprus) Apollon Limassol	Rome, Italy
21:05 CET (UTC+01:00)	Floccari 14', 37'; Ciani (yellow card) 63'	Report	Papoulis 39'; Gullón (yellow card) 47'; Merkis (yellow card) 79'	Stadium: Stadio Olimpico; Attendance: 6,498; Referee: Bobby Madden (Scotland)

28 November 2013 5	Legia Warsaw (Poland)	0–2	(Italy) Lazio	Warsaw, Poland
19:00 CET (UTC+01:00)		Report	Perea 24'; Cavanda (yellow card) 52'; Felipe Anderson 57'	Stadium: Pepsi Arena; Attendance: 12,000; Referee: Kevin Blom (Netherlands)

12 December 2013 6	Lazio (Italy)	0–0	(Turkey) Trabzonspor	Rome, Italy
21:05 CET (UTC+01:00)	Biava (yellow card) 33'; Radu (yellow card) 86'; Candreva (yellow card) 90+1'	Report	Akgün (yellow card) 21'; Demir (yellow card) 59'; Yusuf (yellow card) 67'	Stadium: Stadio Olimpico; Attendance: 7,732; Referee: Clément Turpin (France)

==== Knockout phase ====
===== Round of 32 =====
20 February 2014 First leg	Lazio (Italy)	0–1	(Bulgaria) Ludogorets Razgrad	Rome, Italy
21:05 CET (UTC+01:00)		Report	Bezjak 45'	Stadium: Stadio Olimpico; Attendance: 7,459; Referee: Felix Zwayer (Germany)

27 February 2014 Second leg	Ludogorets Razgrad (Bulgaria)	3–3 (4–3 agg.)	(Italy) Lazio	Sofia, Bulgaria
19:00 CET (UTC+01:00)	Bezjak 67'; Zlatinski 78'; Juninho Quixadá 88'	Report	Keita 1'; Perea 54'; Klose 82'	Stadium: Vasil Levski National Stadium; Attendance: 28,742; Referee: Olegário Benquerença (Portugal)
