= 2012–13 SS Lazio season =

Lazio
2012–13 season
- President: Claudio Lotito
- Manager: Vladimir Petković
- Stadium: Stadio Olimpico
- Serie A: 7th
- Coppa Italia: Winners
- UEFA Europa League: Quarter-finals
- Top goalscorer: League: Miroslav Klose (15); All: Miroslav Klose (16)
- Highest home attendance: 52,506 vs Juventus (Serie A, 29 January 2013)
- Lowest home attendance: 6,682 vs Siena (19 December 2012)
- Average home league attendance: 31,992
Home colours	Away colours	Third colours

The 2012–13 season was the 113th season in Società Sportiva Lazio's history and their club's 25th consecutive season in the top-flight of Italian football. The club competed in Serie A, the Coppa Italia, and the UEFA Europa League.

== Pre-season ==
During the pre-season, Lazio bought Ederson from Lyon, Antonio Candreva from Udinese and Michaël Ciani from Bordeaux.

=== Friendlies ===
14 July 2012	Lazio	14–0	Auronzo di Cadore	Auronzo di Cadore
17:30 CEST	Candreva 15', 28'; Mauri 28'; Ledesma 39'; Ederson 40'; Rozzi 42', 56'; Alfaro 45+1', 53'; González 50', 84'; Kozak 64'; Zárate 82'; Hernanes 90'	Report		Referee: Nicolò Sprezzola

20 July 2012	Lazio	11–0	Top 11 Calcio Club 103	Auronzo di Cadore
17:30 CEST	Candreva 4', 8', 56'; Alfaro 14', 52'; Floccari 31', 40'; Hernanes 72'; Zárate 74', 81'; Kozak 83'	Report		Referee: Daniele Alfarè

21 July 2012	Lazio	6–0	Montebelluna	Auronzo di Cadore
17:30 CEST	Zárate 23'; Hernanes 32'; Candreva 63'; Rozzi 65', 75'; Ledesma 86' (pen.)	Report		Referee: Luca Candeo

25 July 2012	Lazio	0–1	Siena	Auronzo di Cadore
17:30 CEST		Report	Larrondo 41'	Referee: Daniele Chiffi

26 July 2012	Lazio	0–3	Torino	Auronzo di Cadore
15:00 CEST		Report	Sgrigna 17'; Bianchi 19'; Diop 69'	Referee: Daniele Bindoni

1 August 2012	Nuova Circe	0–4	Lazio	Fiuggi
18:30 CEST		Report	Rocchi 32'; Onazi 56'; Alfaro 59'; Floccari 71'	Stadium: Stadio Aldo Ballarin; Referee: Tommaso Diomaiuta

4 August 2012	Galatasaray (Turkey)	1–0	(Italy) Lazio	İzmir, Turkey
21:00 CEST	Elmander 15'	Report		Stadium: İzmir Atatürk Stadium; Attendance: 60,000

7 August 2012	Salernitana	0–3	Lazio	Salerno
18:30 CEST		Report	Ledesma 10' (pen.); Mauri 53'; Zárate 59'	Stadium: Stadio Arechi; Referee: Domenico Celi

11 August 2012	Lazio (Italy)	0–1	(Spain) Getafe	Rome, Italy
21:00 CEST	Biava (yellow card) 33'	Report	Pedro León 14'	Stadium: Stadio Olimpico; Referee: Marco Guida

16 August 2012	Lazio (Italy)	2–1	(Sweden) Malmö	Rome, Italy
21:00 CEST	Hernanes 38' (pen.); Kozák 90+3'	Report	Rexhepi 80'	Stadium: Stadio Olimpico; Referee: Gianpaolo Calvarese

== Players ==
As of 6 February 2013.

Note: Flags indicate national team as defined under FIFA eligibility rules; some limited exceptions apply. Players may hold more than one non-FIFA nationality.

No.	Pos.	Nation	Player
1	GK	ARG	Albano Bizzarri
2	DF	FRA	Michaël Ciani
3	DF	BRA	André Dias
6	MF	ITA	Stefano Mauri (captain)
7	MF	BRA	Ederson
8	MF	BRA	Hernanes
10	FW	ARG	Mauro Zárate
11	FW	GER	Miroslav Klose
15	MF	URU	Álvaro González
17	MF	POR	Bruno Pereirinha
18	FW	CZE	Libor Kozák
19	MF	BIH	Senad Lulić
20	DF	ITA	Giuseppe Biava
21	DF	FRA	Modibo Diakité
22	GK	ITA	Federico Marchetti
23	MF	NGR	Ogenyi Onazi

No.	Pos.	Nation	Player
24	MF	ITA	Cristian Ledesma (vice-captain)
25	FW	ITA	Antonio Rozzi
26	DF	ROU	Ștefan Radu (3rd captain)
27	MF	ALB	Lorik Cana
28	FW	FRA	Louis Saha
29	DF	FRA	Abdoulay Konko
32	MF	ITA	Cristian Brocchi
33	DF	LTU	Marius Stankevičius
39	DF	BEL	Luis Pedro Cavanda
44	GK	ITA	Tiziano Scarfagna
55	GK	ITA	Guido Guerrieri
87	MF	ITA	Antonio Candreva (on loan from Udinese)
95	GK	ALB	Thomas Strakosha
99	FW	ITA	Sergio Floccari
—	MF	ITA	Pasquale Foggia
—	FW	URU	Gonzalo Barreto

== Transfers ==
=== In ===
Date	Pos.	Player	Moving from	Fee
2 July 2012	MF	(Brazil) Ederson Honorato Campos	(France) Lyon	Free
19 July 2012	MF	(Italy) Antonio Candreva	(Italy) Udinese	Loan
27 August 2012	DF	(France) Michaël Ciani	(France) Bordeaux	€4,000,000

=== Out ===
Date	Pos.	Player	Moving to	Fee
4 August 2012	MF	(Italy) Riccardo Perpetuini	(Italy) Salernitana	Loan
16 August 2012	DF	(Spain) Javier Garrido	(England) Norwich City	Loan
16 August 2012	MF	(Italy) Enrico Zampa	(Italy) Salernitana	Loan
31 August 2012	GK	(Italy) Alessandro Berardi	(Italy) Hellas Verona	Loan
31 August 2012	MF	(Italy) Manuel Ricci	(Italy) Salernitana	Loan
31 August 2012	FW	(Italy) Tommaso Ceccarelli	(Italy) Lanciano	Loan
12 September 2012	FW	(Uruguay) Emiliano Alfaro	(United Arab Emirates) Al-Wasl	Loan
3 January 2013	MF	(Brazil) Matuzalém	(Italy) Genoa	Loan
3 January 2013	FW	(Italy) Tommaso Rocchi	(Italy) Internazionale	€300,000
4 January 2013	FW	(Italy) Ettore Mendicino	(Italy) Como	Loan
29 January 2013	DF	(Argentina) Lionel Scaloni	(Italy) Atalanta	Undisclosed

== Competitions ==
=== Serie A ===
==== League table ====
Pos	Team	Pld	W	D	L	GF	GA	GD	Pts	Qualification or relegation
5	Udinese	38	18	12	8	59	45	+14	66	Qualification for the Europa League third qualifying round
6	Roma	38	18	8	12	71	56	+15	62	
7	Lazio	38	18	7	13	51	42	+9	61	Qualification for the Europa League group stage (Note: Lazio qualified for the 2013–14 UEFA Europa League group stage after winning 2012–13 Coppa Italia.)
8	Catania	38	15	11	12	50	46	+4	56	
9	Inter Milan	38	16	6	16	55	57	−2	54	

Source: Serie A, Soccerway
Rules for classification: 1st points; 2nd head-to-head points; 3rd head-to-head goal difference; 4th goal difference; 5th number of goals scored; 6th public draw.
(Head-to-head record is applied for clubs with the same number of points only once all matches between said clubs have been played)

==== Results summary ====
Overall								Home						Away					
Pld	W	D	L	GF	GA	GD	Pts	W	D	L	GF	GA	GD	W	D	L	GF	GA	GD
38	18	7	13	51	42	+9	61	13	2	4	35	16	+19	5	5	9	16	26	−10

Last updated: 19 May 2013.
Source: Competitive matches

==== Results by round ====
Round	1	2	3	4	5	6	7	8	9	10	11	12	13	14	15	16	17	18	19	20	21	22	23	24	25	26	27	28	29	30	31	32	33	34	35	36	37	38
Ground	A	H	A	H	A	H	A	H	A	H	A	H	A	H	H	A	H	A	H	H	A	H	A	H	A	H	A	H	A	H	A	H	A	A	H	A	H	A
Result	W	W	W	L	L	W	W	W	L	D	L	W	D	W	W	D	W	W	W	W	D	L	L	D	L	W	L	L	L	W	D	L	L	D	W	W	W	L
Position	7	3	3	3	5	4	3	3	4	4	5	5	5	5	5	4	3	2	2	3	3	3	3	3	4	3	5	6	7	6	5	5	7	8	7	6	7	7

Updated to match(es) played on 19 May 2013. Source: Competitive matches
A = Away; H = Home; W = Win; D = Draw; L = Loss

==== Matches ====
26 August 2012 1	Atalanta	0–1	Lazio	Bergamo
20:45 CEST (UTC+02:00)	Lucchini (yellow card) 36'	Report	Mauri (yellow card) 10'; Hernanes 17'; Lulić (yellow card) 27'; Klose (yellow card) 44'; Cana (yellow card) 89'	Stadium: Stadio Atleti Azzurri d'Italia; Attendance: 14,441; Referee: Andrea Gervasoni

2 September 2012 2	Lazio	3–0	Palermo	Rome
20:45 CEST (UTC+02:00)	Klose 39', 82', (yellow card) 64'; Candreva 56', (yellow card) 57'; Lulić (yellow card) 59'	Report	Miccoli (yellow card) 58'; Arévalo Ríos (yellow card) 68'	Stadium: Stadio Olimpico; Attendance: 28,279; Referee: Domenico Celi

16 September 2012 3	Chievo	1–3	Lazio	Verona
12:30 CEST (UTC+02:00)	Dainelli (yellow card) 62'; Sardo (yellow card) 73'; Pellissier 84' (pen.); Cesar (yellow card) 89'	Report	Hernanes 5', 74'; Klose 38'; Cavanda (yellow card) 53'; Ledesma (yellow card) 61'	Stadium: Stadio Marc'Antonio Bentegodi; Attendance: 7,500; Referee: Nicola Rizzoli

23 September 2012 4	Lazio	0–1	Genoa	Rome
20:45 CEST (UTC+02:00)	Candreva (yellow card) 68'	Report	Borriello 79', (yellow card) 86'	Stadium: Stadio Olimpico; Attendance: 32,446; Referee: Antonio Damato

26 September 2012 5	Napoli	3–0	Lazio	Naples
20:45 CEST (UTC+02:00)	Cannavaro (yellow card) 12'; Cavani 19', 31', 64'; Pandev (yellow card) 53'; Vargas (yellow card) 90+1'	Report	Cavanda (yellow card) 6'; Konko (yellow card) 25'; Hernanes (yellow card) 45+2'; Ciani (yellow card) 75'	Stadium: Stadio San Paolo; Attendance: 34,433; Referee: Luca Banti

30 September 2012 6	Lazio	2–1	Siena	Rome
15:00 CEST (UTC+02:00)	Klose (yellow card) 10'; Ederson 18'; Mauri (yellow card) 27'; Ledesma 38' (pen.)	Report	Pegolo (yellow card) 36'; Calaiò (yellow card) 45'; Paci 90+1'	Stadium: Stadio Olimpico; Attendance: 28,512; Referee: Matteo Russo

7 October 2012 7	Pescara	0–3	Lazio	Pescara
15:00 CEST (UTC+02:00)	Blasi (yellow card) 43'; Quintero (yellow card) 67'	Report	Hernanes 5'; Klose 25', 35'	Stadium: Stadio Adriatico; Attendance: 12,430; Referee: Andrea De Marco

21 October 2012 8	Lazio	3–2	Milan	Rome
20:45 CEST (UTC+02:00)	Dias (yellow card) 13'; Hernanes 25'; Candreva 41'; Klose 49'; González (yellow card) 56'	Report	Nocerino (yellow card) 12'; Yepes (yellow card) 37'; Antonini (yellow card) 56'; De Jong 61'; El Shaarawy 79'	Stadium: Stadio Olimpico; Attendance: 41,815; Referee: Paolo Tagliavento

28 October 2012 9	Fiorentina	2–0	Lazio	Florence
15:00 CET (UTC+01:00)	Tomović (yellow card) 32'; Ljajić 45+1'; Rodríguez (yellow card) 52'; Olivera (yellow card) 57'; Toni 90'	Report	Ledesma (yellow card) 12' (yellow-red card) 75'; Konko (yellow card) 26'; Lulić (yellow card) 34'; Dias (yellow card) 39'; Hernanes (red card) 82'	Stadium: Stadio Artemio Franchi; Attendance: 19,395; Referee: Mauro Bergonzi

31 October 2012 10	Lazio	1–1	Torino	Rome
20:45 CET (UTC+01:00)	Cana (yellow card) 45+2'; Mauri 57'; Biava (yellow card) 88'; Klose (yellow card) 90'	Report	Glik 10'; Rodríguez (yellow card) 36'	Stadium: Stadio Olimpico; Attendance: 22,000; Referee: Antonio Danilo Giannoccaro

4 November 2012 11	Catania	4–0	Lazio	Catania
15:00 CET (UTC+01:00)	Gómez 9', 29'; Lodi 25' (pen.); Álvarez (yellow card) 27'; Barrientos 69'	Report		Stadium: Stadio Angelo Massimino; Attendance: 10,922; Referee: Paolo Mazzoleni

11 November 2012 12	Lazio	3–2	Roma	Rome
15:00 CET (UTC+01:00)	Klose (yellow card) 20', (goal) 45'; Candreva 37', (yellow card) 45+4'; Lulić (yellow card) 41'; Mauri 46', (yellow card) 58' (yellow-red card) 85'	Report	Lamela 11'; Bradley (yellow card) 27'; Burdisso (yellow card) 35'; De Rossi (red card) 45+4'; Tachtsidis (yellow card) 79'; Marquinho (yellow card) 89'; Pjanić 86'	Stadium: Stadio Olimpico; Attendance: 51,461; Referee: Gianluca Rocchi

17 November 2012 13	Juventus	0–0	Lazio	Turin
18:00 CET (UTC+01:00)	Bonucci (yellow card) 48'; Vidal (yellow card) 90+5'	Report	Marchetti (yellow card) 52'; Ledesma (yellow card) 89'	Stadium: Juventus Stadium; Attendance: 38,357; Referee: Daniele Orsato

27 November 2012 14	Lazio	3–0	Udinese	Rome
20:45 CET (UTC+01:00)	González 17'; Klose 31'; Ledesma (yellow card) 39'; Hernanes 59'; Cana (yellow card) 84'	Report	Coda (yellow card) 58'; Maicosuel (yellow card) 90+2'	Stadium: Stadio Olimpico; Attendance: 26,023; Referee: Gianpaolo Calvarese

2 December 2012 15	Lazio	2–1	Parma	Rome
15:00 CET (UTC+01:00)	Biava (yellow card) 21', (goal) 25'; Klose 34'; Radu (yellow card) 50'; Cavanda (yellow card) 84'	Report	Belfodil 66'	Stadium: Stadio Olimpico; Attendance: 27,220; Referee: Marco Guida

10 December 2012 16	Bologna	0–0	Lazio	Bologna
21:00 CET (UTC+01:00)	Guarente (yellow card) 57'; Sørensen (yellow card) 79'	Report	Cavanda (yellow card) 31'; Kozák (yellow card) 55' (yellow-red card) 86'	Stadium: Stadio Renato Dall'Ara; Attendance: 15,543; Referee: Antonio Damato

15 December 2012 17	Lazio	1–0	Internazionale	Rome
20:45 CET (UTC+01:00)	Konko (yellow card) 66'; Klose 82'; Candreva (yellow card) 90'	Report	Gargano (yellow card) 45'; Samuel (yellow card) 52'	Stadium: Stadio Olimpico; Attendance: 39,811; Referee: Paolo Mazzoleni

22 December 2012 18	Sampdoria	0–1	Lazio	Genoa
15:00 CET (UTC+01:00)	Soriano (yellow card) 46'; Obiang (yellow card) 80'	Report	Hernanes 31'; Lulić (yellow card) 41'; Biava (yellow card) 66'; González (yellow card) 76'	Stadium: Stadio Luigi Ferraris; Attendance: 21,833; Referee: Nicola Rizzoli

5 January 2013 19	Lazio	2–1	Cagliari	Rome
20:45 CET (UTC+01:00)	Dias (yellow card) 44'; Konko 79'; Candreva 86' (pen.)	Report	Dessena (yellow card) 47'; Sau 62'; Agazzi (yellow card) 83' (yellow-red card) 83'; Cossu (red card) 85'	Stadium: Stadio Olimpico; Attendance: 30,409; Referee: Daniele Orsato

13 January 2013 20	Lazio	2–0	Atalanta	Rome
15:00 CET (UTC+01:00)	Candreva (yellow card) 29'; Floccari 67'; Ciani (yellow card) 75'; Brivio 77' (o.g.)	Report	Stendardo (yellow card) 59'; Raimondi (yellow card) 68'; Cigarini (yellow card) 69'; De Luca (yellow card) 75'; Carmona (yellow card) 76' (yellow-red card) 83'	Stadium: Stadio Olimpico; Attendance: 30,603; Referee: Sebastiano Peruzzo

19 January 2013 21	Palermo	2–2	Lazio	Palermo
18:00 CET (UTC+01:00)	García (yellow card) 18'; Miccoli (yellow card) 45'; Arévalo Ríos 70'; Dybala 71'; Von Bergen (yellow card) 79'	Report	Floccari 10'; Cavanda (yellow card) 43'; Lulić (yellow card) 58'; Hernanes 84' (pen.); Cana (yellow card) 90+1'	Stadium: Stadio Renzo Barbera; Attendance: 21,414; Referee: Gianluca Rocchi

26 January 2013 22	Lazio	0–1	Chievo	Rome
18:00 CET (UTC+01:00)	Dias (yellow card) 20'; Biava (yellow card) 59'; Hernanes (yellow card) 73'	Report	Vacek (yellow card) 36'; Paloschi 61'	Stadium: Stadio Olimpico; Attendance: 27,120; Referee: Piero Giacomelli

3 February 2013 23	Genoa	3–2	Lazio	Genoa
15:00 CET (UTC+01:00)	Borriello 16'; Bertolacci 22'; Manfredini (yellow card) 37'; Matuzalém (yellow card) 69'; Moretti (yellow card) 81'; Rigoni 90+5'	Report	Ciani (yellow card) 29'; Floccari 58'; Mauri 82' (pen.); Lulić (yellow card) 86'	Stadium: Stadio Luigi Ferraris; Attendance: 18,416; Referee: Paolo Tagliavento

9 February 2013 24	Lazio	1–1	Napoli	Rome
20:45 CET (UTC+01:00)	Floccari 11'; Ledesma (yellow card) 50'; Hernanes (yellow card) 57'; Radu (yellow card) 58'; Dias (yellow card) 67'; Cana (yellow card) 81'	Report	Mesto (yellow card) 25'; Insigne (yellow card) 45+3'; Campagnaro (yellow card) 70', (goal) 87'; Colombo (red card) 88'	Stadium: Stadio Olimpico; Attendance: 38,594; Referee: Daniele Orsato

18 February 2013 25	Siena	3–0	Lazio	Siena
20:45 CET (UTC+01:00)	Emeghara 6', 61'; Rosina 23'	Report	Ciani (yellow card) 17'; Pereirinha (yellow card) 65'	Stadium: Stadio Artemio Franchi – Montepaschi Arena; Attendance: 8,679; Referee: Antonio Danilo Giannoccaro

25 February 2013 26	Lazio	2–0	Pescara	Rome
21:00 CET (UTC+01:00)	Radu 29'; Lulić 35'	Report		Stadium: Stadio Olimpico; Attendance: 26,613; Referee: Andrea Romeo

2 March 2013 27	Milan	3–0	Lazio	Milan
20:45 CET (UTC+01:00)	Pazzini (yellow card) 32', (goal) 40', 60'; Boateng 44', (yellow card) 58'; Yepes (yellow card) 90'	Report	Candreva (red card) 17'; Biava (yellow card) 47'; Radu (yellow card) 59'	Stadium: San Siro; Attendance: 47,421; Referee: Nicola Rizzoli

10 March 2013 28	Lazio	0–2	Fiorentina	Rome
20:45 CET (UTC+01:00)	Hernanes (yellow card) 51'; Dias (yellow card) 64'; González (yellow card) 69'; Cana (yellow card) 75'	Report	Jovetić 20'; Ljajić 49'; Rômulo (yellow card) 89'	Stadium: Stadio Olimpico; Attendance: 29,145; Referee: Andrea Gervasoni

17 March 2013 29	Torino	1–0	Lazio	Turin
20:45 CET (UTC+01:00)	Glik (yellow card) 4'; Cerci (yellow card) 15'; Jonathas 82'	Report	Ciani (yellow card) 15' (yellow-red card) 16'	Stadium: Stadio Olimpico di Torino; Attendance: 11,743; Referee: Paolo Tagliavento

30 March 2013 30	Lazio	2–1	Catania	Rome
15:00 CET (UTC+01:00)	Ledesma (yellow card) 76'; Legrottaglie 79' (o.g.); Candreva 81' (pen.); Marchetti (yellow card) 90+3'	Report	Marchese (yellow card) 17'; Izco 50'; Lodi (yellow card) 83'; Barrientos (yellow card) 90+3'	Stadium: Stadio Olimpico; Attendance: 28,287; Referee: Davide Massa

8 April 2013 31	Roma	1–1	Lazio	Rome
20:45 CEST (UTC+02:00)	De Rossi (yellow card) 43'; Totti 57' (pen.); Lamela (yellow card) 57'; Pjanić (yellow card) 81'; Castán (yellow card) 90+2'	Report	Hernanes 16'; Radu (yellow card) 31'; Lulić (yellow card) 52'; Cana (yellow card) 57'; Biava (yellow card) 63' (yellow-red card) 69'	Stadium: Stadio Olimpico; Attendance: 52,326; Referee: Paolo Mazzoleni

15 April 2013 32	Lazio	0–2	Juventus	Rome
20:45 CEST (UTC+02:00)	Cana (yellow card) 7'; Ciani (yellow card) 53'	Report	Vidal 8' (pen.), 28', (yellow card) 14'; Peluso (yellow card) 41'	Stadium: Stadio Olimpico; Attendance: 38,641; Referee: Antonio Danilo Giannoccaro

20 April 2013 33	Udinese	1–0	Lazio	Udine
20:45 CEST (UTC+02:00)	Di Natale 19'; Lazzari (yellow card) 54'; Domizzi (yellow card) 68'	Report	Ledesma (yellow card) 55'; Ederson (yellow card) 70'; González (yellow card) 82'	Stadium: Stadio Friuli; Attendance: 13,250; Referee: Marco Guida

29 April 2013 34	Parma	0–0	Lazio	Parma
20:45 CEST (UTC+02:00)	Valdés (yellow card) 15'; Marchionni (yellow card) 66'; Amauri (yellow card) 69'; Ninis (yellow card) 85'; Parolo (yellow card) 90+5'	Report	Candreva (yellow card) 31'; Biava (yellow card) 51' (yellow-red card) 90+3'	Stadium: Stadio Ennio Tardini; Attendance: 11,095; Referee: Gianpaolo Calvarese

5 May 2013 35	Lazio	6–0	Bologna	Rome
15:00 CEST (UTC+02:00)	Lulić (yellow card) 11'; Klose 21', 36', 39', 50', 61'; Hernanes 31'	Report	Abero (yellow card) 57'; Kone (yellow card) 62'; Guarente (yellow card) 90+2'	Stadium: Stadio Olimpico; Attendance: 27,680; Referee: Andrea De Marco

8 May 2013 36	Internazionale	1–3	Lazio	Milan
20:45 CEST (UTC+02:00)	Álvarez 33'; Ranocchia (yellow card) 45+3'; Juan (yellow card) 75'; Pereira (yellow card) 83'	Report	Handanović 22' (o.g.); Ledesma (yellow card) 33'; Hernanes 45+4' (pen.); Onazi 76'	Stadium: San Siro; Attendance: 39,528; Referee: Mauro Bergonzi

12 May 2013 37	Lazio	2–0	Sampdoria	Rome
15:00 CEST (UTC+02:00)	Floccari 10', (yellow card) 73'; Candreva 90+4' (pen.)	Report	Rodríguez (yellow card) 16'; Maresca (yellow card) 43'; Mustafi (yellow card) 86'	Stadium: Stadio Olimpico; Attendance: 32,000; Referee: Andrea Romeo

19 May 2013 38	Cagliari	1–0	Lazio	Trieste
20:45 CEST (UTC+02:00)	Dessena (yellow card) 72', (goal) 75'	Report	Cana (yellow card) 36'	Stadium: Stadio Nereo Rocco; Attendance: 9,000; Referee: Antonio Danilo Giannoccaro

=== Coppa Italia ===
19 December 2012 Round of 16	Lazio	1–1 (a.e.t.) (4–1 p)	Siena	Rome
15:00 CET	Ciani 90+5'	Report	Del Grosso (yellow card) 49'; Cana 56' (o.g.); Belmonte (yellow card) 109'; Bolzoni (yellow card) 115'; Larrondo (yellow card) 117'	Stadium: Stadio Olimpico; Attendance: 6,682; Referee: Piero Giacomelli
	Penalties
	Mauri (penalty scored); Ledesma (penalty scored); Floccari (penalty scored); Kozák (penalty scored)		Belmonte (penalty scored); Vergassola (penalty missed); Larrondo (penalty missed)

8 January 2013 Quarter-finals	Lazio	3–0	Catania	Rome
21:00 CET	Radu 30'; Hernanes 61', 90+1'; Brocchi (yellow card) 90+2'	Report	Bellusci (yellow card) 28'; Bergessio (yellow card) 36'; Rolín (yellow card) 42'; Barrientos (yellow card) 60'	Stadium: Stadio Olimpico; Attendance: 16,537; Referee: Domenico Celi

22 January 2013 Semi-finals; First leg	Juventus	1–1	Lazio	Turin
20:45 CET (UTC+01:00)	Peluso 63'	Report	Mauri 86'	Stadium: Juventus Stadium; Attendance: 32,433; Referee: Antonio Damato

29 January 2013 Semi-finals; Second leg	Lazio	2–1	Juventus	Rome
20:45 CET (UTC+01:00)	González 53'; Floccari 90+3'	Report	Vidal 90+1'	Stadium: Stadio Olimpico; Attendance: 52,506; Referee: Luca Banti

26 May 2013 Final	Roma	0–1	Lazio	Rome
18:00 CET (UTC+01:00)		Report	Lulić 71'	Stadium: Stadio Olimpico; Attendance: 70,000; Referee: Daniele Orsato

=== UEFA Europa League ===
==== Play-off round ====
23 August 2012 First leg	Mura 05 (Slovenia)	0–2	(Italy) Lazio	Maribor, Slovenia^{1}
21:00 CEST (UTC+02:00)	Janža (yellow card) 49'; Majer (yellow card) 90+1'	Report	Hernanes 31'; Klose 59', (yellow card) 64'; Onazi (yellow card) 88'	Stadium: Ljudski vrt Attendance: 4,200; Referee: Mark Courtney (Northern Ireland)

30 August 2012 Second leg	Lazio (Italy)	3–1 (5–1 agg.)	(Slovenia) Mura 05	Rome, Italy
21:00 CEST (UTC+02:00)	Kozák 30', 55'; Zárate 42'; Rozzi (yellow card) 65'	Report	Horvat (yellow card) 38'; Travner 88'	Stadium: Stadio Olimpico; Attendance: 12,138; Referee: Leontios Trattou (Cyprus)

Note 1: Mura 05 played their home match at Ljudski vrt, Maribor as their own Fazanerija City Stadium did not meet UEFA criteria.

==== Group stage ====
Pos	Team	Pld	W	D	L	GF	GA	GD	Pts	Qualification
1	(Italy) Lazio	6	3	3	0	9	2	+7	12	Advance to knockout phase
2	(England) Tottenham Hotspur	6	2	4	0	8	4	+4	10	Advance to knockout phase
3	(Greece) Panathinaikos	6	1	2	3	4	11	−7	5	
4	(Slovenia) Maribor	6	1	1	4	6	10	−4	4	

Source: Soccerway

20 September 2012 1	Tottenham Hotspur (England)	0–0	(Italy) Lazio	London, England
21:05 CEST (UTC+02:00)		Report	Biava (yellow card) 28'; Dias (yellow card) 62'; González (yellow card) 66'; Mauri (yellow card) 84'	Stadium: White Hart Lane; Attendance: 25,030; Referee: Ovidiu Hațegan (Romania)

4 October 2012 2	Lazio (Italy)	1–0	(Slovenia) Maribor	Rome, Italy
19:00 CEST (UTC+02:00)	Cana (yellow card) 54'; Ederson 62'	Report	Tavares (yellow card) 45+1'; Vidović (red card) 76'	Stadium: Stadio Olimpico; Attendance: 9,994; Referee: Szymon Marciniak (Poland)

25 October 2012 3	Panathinaikos (Greece)	1–1	(Italy) Lazio	Athens, Greece
19:00 CEST (UTC+02:00)	Toché 90+1'	Report	Seitaridis 25' (o.g.); Cana (yellow card) 89'; Cavanda (yellow card) 89'	Stadium: Olympic Stadium; Attendance: 13,008; Referee: Carlos Clos Gómez (Spain)

8 November 2012 4	Lazio (Italy)	3–0	(Greece) Panathinaikos	Rome, Italy
21:05 CET (UTC+01:00)	Kozák 23', 40'; Floccari 59'; Cana (yellow card) 72'	Report	Seitaridis (yellow card) 24'; Vitolo (yellow card) 32'; Velázquez (yellow card) 42'	Stadium: Stadio Olimpico; Attendance: 9,086; Referee: Robert Schörgenhofer (Austria)

22 November 2012 5	Lazio (Italy)	0–0	(England) Tottenham Hotspur	Rome, Italy
19:00 CET (UTC+01:00)	Mauri (yellow card) 85'; Floccari (yellow card) 85'	Report	Vertonghen (yellow card) 75'	Stadium: Stadio Olimpico; Attendance: 23,318; Referee: Fernando Teixeira Vitienes (Spain)

6 December 2012 6	Maribor (Slovenia)	1–4	(Italy) Lazio	Maribor, Slovenia
21:05 CET (UTC+01:00)	Filipović (yellow card) 37'; Tavares 84'	Report	Kozák 16', (yellow card) 22'; Radu 32'; Floccari 38', 51'; Cavanda (yellow card) 65'; Ciani (yellow card) 88'	Stadium: Ljudski vrt Attendance: 10,300; Referee: István Vad (Hungary)

==== Knockout phase ====
===== Round of 32 =====
14 February 2013 First leg	Borussia Mönchengladbach (Germany)	3–3	(Italy) Lazio	Mönchengladbach, Germany
21:05 CET	Stranzl 17' (pen.); Marx 84' (pen.); Arango 88', (yellow card) 90+1'	Report	Dias (yellow card) 22' (yellow-red card) 69'; González (yellow card) 40'; Floccari 57'; Kozák 64', 90+4', (yellow card) 83'; Cana (yellow card) 83'	Stadium: Borussia-Park; Attendance: 46,279; Referee: Sergei Karasev (Russia)

21 February 2013 Second leg	Lazio (Italy)	2–0 (5–3 agg.)	(Germany) Borussia Mönchengladbach	Rome, Italy
19:00 CET	Candreva 10'; González 33'	Report	Younes (yellow card) 77'	Stadium: Stadio Olimpico; Attendance: 27,174; Referee: Hüseyin Göçek (Turkey)

===== Round of 16 =====
7 March 2013 First leg	VfB Stuttgart (Germany)	0–2	(Italy) Lazio	Stuttgart, Germany
19:00 CET	Tasci (yellow card) 49'; Harnik (yellow card) 87'	Report	Ederson 21'; Hernanes (yellow card) 38'; Ciani (yellow card) 45+2'; Onazi 56'; Cana (yellow card) 87'	Stadium: Mercedes-Benz Arena; Attendance: 28,750; Referee: Alexandru Tudor (Romania)

14 March 2013 Second leg	Lazio (Italy)	3–1 (5–1 agg.)	(Germany) VfB Stuttgart	Rome, Italy
21:05 CET	Kozák 6', 8', 87'; Biava (yellow card) 82'	Report	Ibišević (yellow card) 10'; Hajnal (yellow card) 16', (goal) 62'	Stadium: Stadio Olimpico; Attendance: —^{2} Referee: Tom Harald Hagen (Norway)

Note 2: The first match that was played behind closed doors due to the punishment handed to Lazio by UEFA following racism issue of their 300 fans at Stadio Olimpico in a match against Borussia Mönchengladbach in second leg of 2012–13 UEFA Europa League round of 32.

===== Quarter-finals =====
4 April 2013 First leg	Fenerbahçe (Turkey)	2–0	(Italy) Lazio	Istanbul, Turkey
21:05 CEST (UTC+02:00)	Korkmaz (yellow card) 45+2'; Webó 78' (pen.), (yellow card) 79'; Kuyt 90+1'; Meireles (yellow card) 90+4'	Report	Onazi (yellow card) 31' (yellow-red card) 48'; Ederson (yellow card) 51'; Marchetti (yellow card) 54'; Radu (yellow card) 78'; Mauri (yellow card) 90'	Stadium: Şükrü Saracoğlu Stadium; Attendance: 43,629; Referee: Willie Collum (Scotland)

11 April 2013 Second leg	Lazio (Italy)	1–1 (1–3 agg.)	(Turkey) Fenerbahçe	Rome, Italy
21:05 CEST (UTC+02:00)	Kozák (yellow card) 45+1'; Lulić 60', (yellow card) 64'; Klose (yellow card) 72'	Report	Ziegler (yellow card) 31'; Cristian (yellow card) 33'; Erkin (yellow card) 62', (goal) 73'	Stadium: Stadio Olimpico; Attendance: 0^{3} Referee: Pavel Královec (Czech Republic)

Note 3: The second match that was played behind closed doors due to the punishment handed to Lazio by UEFA following racism issue of their 300 fans at Stadio Olimpico in a match against Borussia Mönchengladbach in second leg of 2012–13 UEFA Europa League round of 32.

== Statistics ==
=== Appearances and goals ===
No.	Pos	Nat	Player	Total		Serie A		Coppa Italia		Europa League	
No.	Pos	Nat	Player	Apps	Goals	Apps	Goals	Apps	Goals	Apps	Goals
Goalkeepers
1	GK	(Argentina) ARG	Albano Bizzarri	11	0	5	0	1	0	4+1	0
22	GK	(Italy) ITA	Federico Marchetti	46	0	33	0	3	0	10	0
Defenders
2	DF	(France) FRA	Michaël Ciani	34	1	13+5	0	3+2	1	9+2	0
3	DF	(Brazil) BRA	André Dias	34	0	25+2	0	1	0	6	0
20	DF	(Italy) ITA	Giuseppe Biava	43	1	30+1	1	4	0	8	0
21	DF	(France) FRA	Modibo Diakité	1	0	0	0	1	0	0	0
26	DF	(Romania) ROU	Ștefan Radu	36	3	22+1	1	3+1	1	9	1
29	DF	(France) FRA	Abdoulay Konko	34	1	25	1	2+1	0	5+1	0
33	DF	(Lithuania) LTU	Marius Stankevicius	3	0	2+1	0	0	0	0	0
39	DF	(Belgium) BEL	Luis Pedro Cavanda	24	0	8+6	0	3	0	7	0
Midfielders
6	MF	(Italy) ITA	Stefano Mauri	36	4	23+3	3	2+2	1	5+1	0
7	MF	(Brazil) BRA	Ederson	23	3	4+11	1	0	0	5+3	2
8	MF	(Brazil) BRA	Hernanes	53	14	30+4	11	5	2	13+1	1
15	MF	(Uruguay) URU	Álvaro González	49	3	29+5	1	3+1	1	9+2	1
17	MF	(Portugal) POR	Bruno Pereirinha	11	0	3+5	0	0	0	2+1	0
19	MF	(Bosnia and Herzegovina) BIH	Senad Lulić	50	3	29+4	1	4+1	1	10+2	1
23	MF	(Nigeria) NGR	Ogenyi Onazi	28	2	8+7	1	2	0	8+3	1
24	MF	(Italy) ITA	Cristian Ledesma	52	1	35+1	1	4+1	0	8+3	0
27	MF	(Albania) ALB	Lorik Cana	38	0	13+11	0	4+1	0	7+2	0
32	MF	(Italy) ITA	Cristian Brocchi	11	0	2+6	0	1+2	0	0	0
87	MF	(Italy) ITA	Antonio Candreva	49	7	32+3	6	2+1	0	9+2	1
Forwards
10	FW	(Argentina) ARG	Mauro Zárate	7	1	1	0	0	0	2+4	1
11	FW	(Germany) GER	Miroslav Klose	36	16	26+3	15	2	0	2+3	1
18	FW	(Czech Republic) CZE	Libor Kozák	31	10	5+14	0	1	0	8+3	10
25	FW	(Italy) ITA	Antonio Rozzi	4	0	0	0	0+1	0	0+3	0
28	FW	(France) FRA	Louis Saha	6	0	1+5	0	0	0	0	0
99	FW	(Italy) ITA	Sergio Floccari	36	10	11+11	5	3+1	1	6+4	4
Players transferred out during the season
5	DF	(Argentina) ARG	Lionel Scaloni	7	0	1+3	0	0	0	2+1	0
9	FW	(Italy) ITA	Tommaso Rocchi	3	0	2+1	0	0	0	0	0
84	GK	(Argentina) ARG	Juan Pablo Carrizo	1	0	0	0	1	0	0	0

Last updated: 28 October 2012
Source: Competitions

=== Goalscorers ===
Rank	Name	League	Coppa Italia	Europe	Total
1	(Germany) Miroslav Klose	15	0	1	16
2	(Brazil) Hernanes	11	2	1	14
3	(Czech Republic) Libor Kozák	0	0	10	10
4	(Italy) Sergio Floccari	5	1	4	10
5	(Italy) Antonio Candreva	5	0	1	6
6	(Italy) Stefano Mauri	3	1	0	4
7	(Romania) Ștefan Radu	1	1	1	3
7	(Uruguay) Álvaro González	1	1	1	3
7	(Brazil) Ederson	1	0	2	3
7	(Bosnia and Herzegovina) Senad Lulić	1	1	1	3
11	(Nigeria) Ogenyi Onazi	1	0	1	2
12	(France) Abdoulay Konko	1	0	0	1
12	(Italy) Giuseppe Biava	1	0	0	1
12	(Italy) Cristian Ledesma	1	0	0	1
12	(France) Michaël Ciani	0	1	0	1
12	(Argentina) Mauro Zárate	0	0	1	1
	Own Goals	3	0	1	4
Total		49	8	25	82
