= Thomas Strakosha =

Albanian footballer (born 1995)

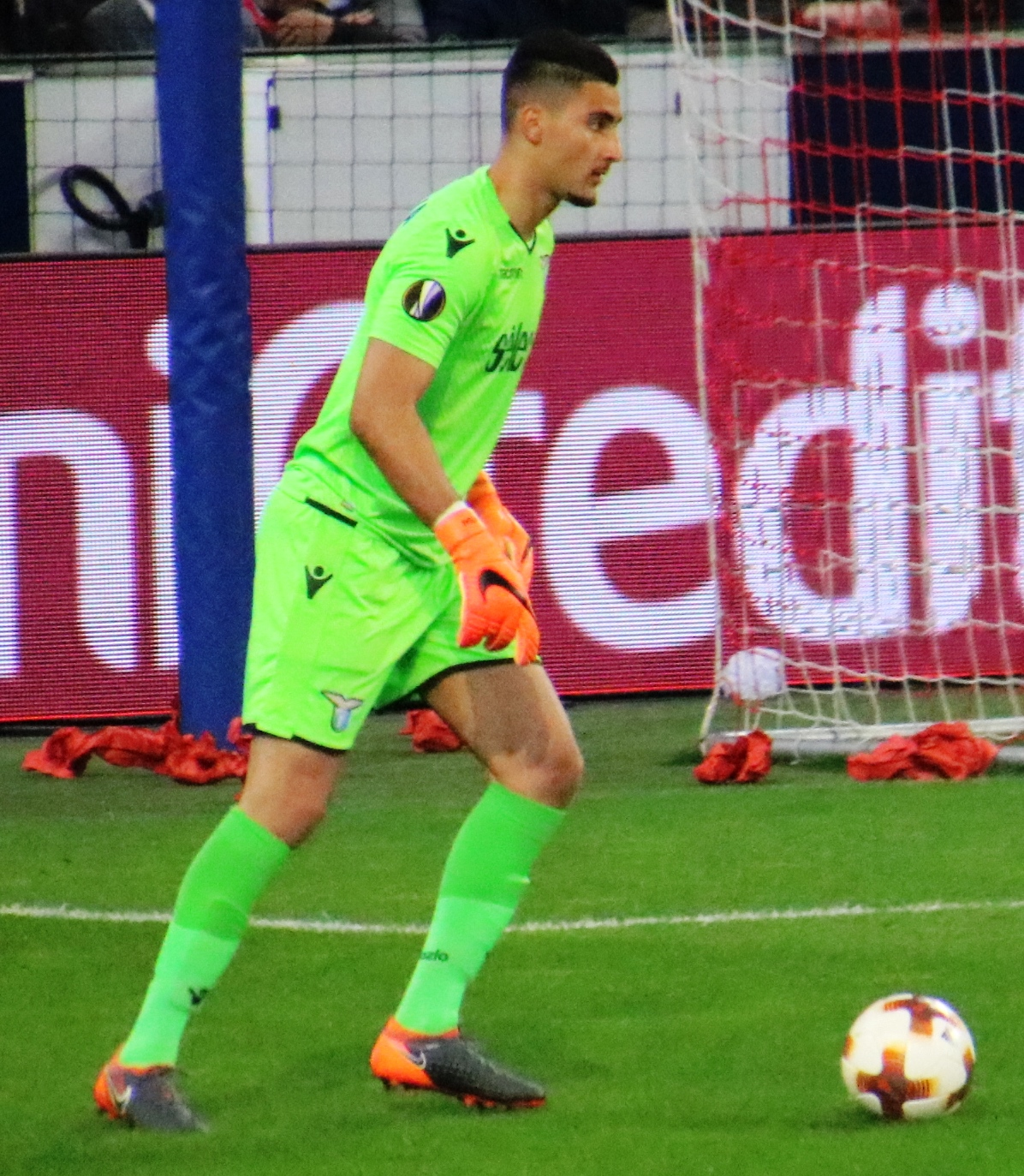
- Strakosha playing for Lazio in 2018

Personal information
- Full name: Thomas Strakosha
- Date of birth: 19 March 1995 (age 31)
- Place of birth: Athens, Greece
- Height: 1.93 m (6 ft 4 in)
- Position: Goalkeeper

Team information
- Current team: AEK Athens
- Number: 1

Youth career
- 2007–2010: APOEL
- 2010–2012: Panionios
- 2012–2014: Lazio

Senior career*
Years	Team	Apps	(Gls)
2013–2022	Lazio	164	(0)
2015–2016	→ Salernitana (loan)	11	(0)
2022–2024	Brentford	2	(0)
2024–	AEK Athens	57	(0)

International career^{‡}
2012–2013	Albania U19	6	(0)
2013–2016	Albania U21	11	(0)
2017–	Albania	47	(0)
- * Club domestic league appearances and goals as of 21 November 2026 ‡ National team caps and goals as of 31 March 2026

Thomas Strakosha (Albanian pronunciation: [ˈtɔmas straˈkɔʃa]; born 19 March 1995) is a professional footballer who plays as a goalkeeper for Super League Greece club AEK Athens and the Albania national team.

Born in Athens, he began his youth career at APOEL in Cyprus while his father Foto worked there as a goalkeeping coach, before moving to Panionios. He joined Lazio in 2011 and progressed through the club's youth system, later making his senior debut and making over 200 appearances, winning the Coppa Italia and the Supercoppa Italiana twice each. In 2022, he signed for Brentford, where he made limited first-team appearances, before joining AEK Athens in 2024 and becoming the club's first-choice goalkeeper, winning the 2025–26 Super League Greece.

At international level, Strakosha represented Albania U19 and U21 before making his senior debut in 2017, and was included in the UEFA Euro 2024 squad.

== Club career ==
=== Early career ===
Strakosha was born in Athens, Greece, to Albanian parents; his father, Foto Strakosha, is a former Albanian international goalkeeper. He developed an interest in football at a young age and was supported by his family in pursuing the sport. Around the age of 15, he joined the youth setup of APOEL in Cyprus, where his father was working as a goalkeeping coach. Strakosha moved to the youth academy of Panionios in 2010 alongside his father, who once again worked as a goalkeeping coach, before joining Lazio in 2011 for a reported fee of €75,000. He later became regular for the Primavera team and was part of the squad that won the 2013–14 Campionato Nazionale, defeating Atalanta 3–0 in the final on 10 April 2014.

=== Lazio ===
Strakosha was first called up to the Lazio senior squad during the 2012–13 season, being included as third-choice goalkeeper for the 2012–13 Serie A match against Fiorentina on 28 October 2012 due to the absence of first-choice goalkeeper Federico Marchetti. Following the departure of Juan Pablo Carrizo in January 2013, he was included as third-choice goalkeeper for several Lazio first-team matches during the second half of the season, remaining an unused substitute throughout the campaign. He was also part of the squad for the 2013 Coppa Italia final against city rivals Roma on 26 May 2013, as Lazio won the match 1–0 to lift the trophy. On 18 August 2013, he was included in the squad for the 2013 Supercoppa Italiana against Juventus, as Lazio were defeated 4–0. Strakosha remained third-choice goalkeeper during the 2013–14 season, regularly appearing in Serie A matchday squads without making a first-team appearance. In July 2014, he stated that his objective was either to remain with the first team or move on loan to gain playing experience. On 11 July 2014, Lazio sporting director Igli Tare announced that Strakosha had signed a contract extension with the club until 2019. Strakosha remained at Lazio for a third consecutive season in 2014–15, continuing as the club's third-choice goalkeeper without making a first-team appearance. He was included in the squad for the 2015 Coppa Italia final against Juventus on 20 May 2015, where Lazio lost 2–1 after extra time.

==== Loan to Salernitana ====
In July 2015, Strakosha joined newly promoted Serie B club Salernitana on loan. He made his professional debut on 9 August 2015 in a 1–0 victory against Pisa in the second round of the 2015–16 Coppa Italia. A week later, he featured in the third round of the Coppa Italia, making several saves and keeping a clean sheet for 120 minutes as Salernitana defeated Chievo Verona 1–0 to advance. He remained on the bench in the fourth round, as Salernitana were eliminated following a 2–0 defeat to Spezia. He made his league debut on 6 September 2015 in the opening match of the 2015–16 Serie B season against Avellino, playing the full match in a 3–1 victory. After also featuring in the second league match in a 2–2 draw against Brescia, he spent most of the season on the bench, although he started regularly during October and November 2015, making seven consecutive appearances during which he conceded 11 goals and Salernitana remained winless, recording four draws and three defeats. On 17 October 2015, Strakosha made an error in Salernitana's 1–0 away defeat to Virtus Entella, failing to deal with a cross which led to the only goal of the match. On 27 February 2016, he saved a penalty in a 1–1 away draw against Trapani. Strakosha finished the season with 11 league appearances and 16 goals conceded, while Salernitana avoided relegation after defeating Virtus Lanciano in the play-out round, with Strakosha remaining an unused substitute in both matches.

==== Return to Lazio and breakthrough ====
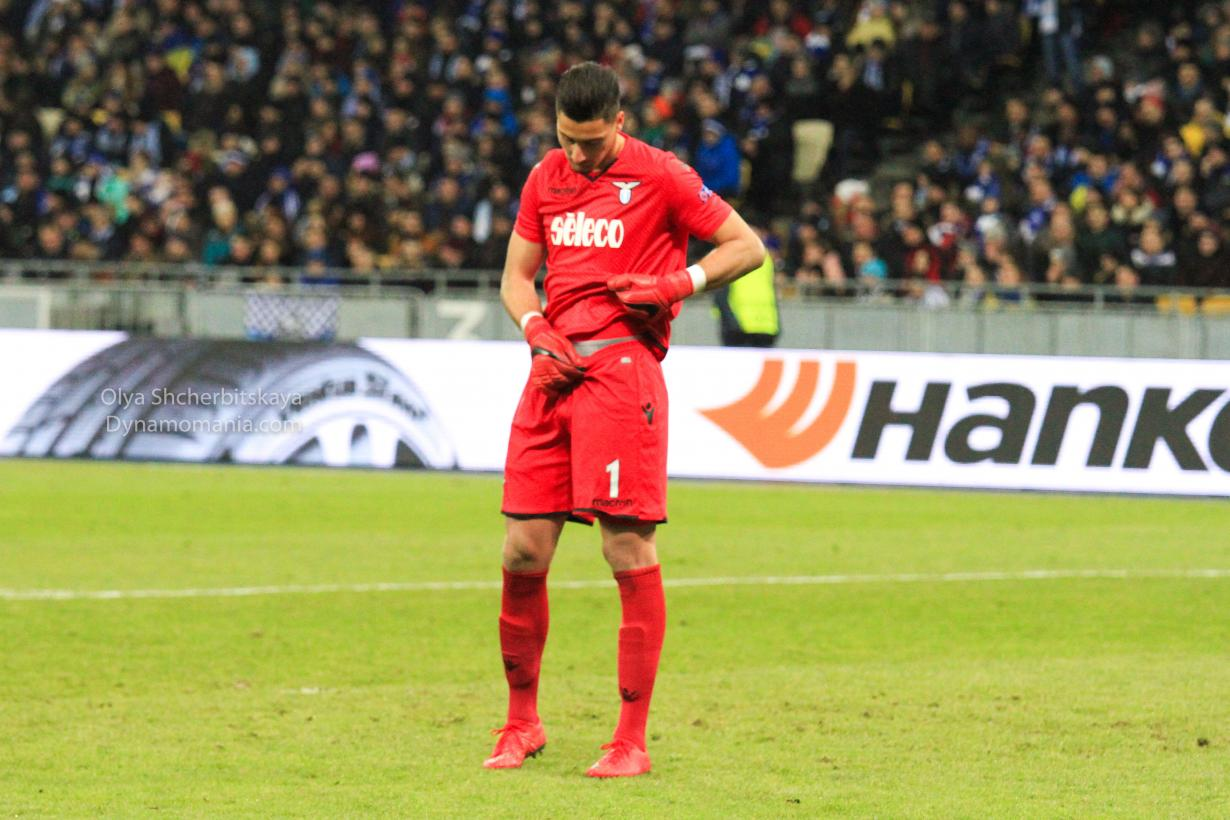
Strakosha playing for Lazio in 2018.

In July 2016, following the end of his loan spell, Strakosha returned to Lazio. Shortly before the close of the summer transfer window, he was linked with a move to Cardiff City, but remained at the club after sporting director Igli Tare intervened, while Etrit Berisha was nearing a transfer to Atalanta. Following the injury of Federico Marchetti, Strakosha made his Lazio debut on 20 September 2016 in a league match against Milan. Despite the 2–0 defeat, his performance received positive reviews, and he was named Lazio's man of the match. Five days later, he kept his first Serie A clean sheet in only his second appearance, in a 2–0 home win against Empoli; the performance led 1982 FIFA World Cup winner Dino Zoff to praise him, stating: "I cannot judge him after only two matches, but in my opinion he performed well in both games." He followed this with another clean sheet on the next matchday, helping Lazio to a 3–0 away victory against Udinese on 1 October 2016. On 18 January 2017, Strakosha featured in the 2016–17 Coppa Italia round of 16 match against Genoa, starting in goal as Lazio won 4–2 and advanced to the quarter-finals of the competition. On 22 February 2017, Strakosha renewed his contract with Lazio until 2022. In Serie A he made a few further appearances in the first half of the season before becoming the regular starting goalkeeper under Simone Inzaghi from matchday 22 until the end of the campaign, establishing himself as first-choice through consistent performances, a breakthrough that was also facilitated in part by the recurring injuries of his rival Federico Marchetti. He finished the season with 21 appearances, 1,844 minutes played, and six clean sheets, as Lazio ended the Serie A campaign in 5th place. During the Coppa Italia semi-finals, Strakosha started both legs against Roma, keeping a clean sheet in the first leg of a 2–0 home victory on 1 March 2017 before conceding three goals in the return leg on 3 April 2017, as Lazio progressed to the final with a 4–3 aggregate win. Strakosha also featured in the final, where Lazio were defeated 2–0 by Juventus. On 13 August 2017, Strakosha played in the 2017 Supercoppa Italiana against Juventus and won his first major trophy as Lazio triumphed 3–2 with a late decisive goal.

During the 2017–18 season, Strakosha made 53 appearances and played 4,800 minutes across all competitions for Lazio, missing only three matches (all in the Europa League), while conceding 63 goals and keeping 17 clean sheets, establishing himself as one of the club's key players, maintaining a save percentage of 72.1% and contributing to Lazio's push for a top-four Serie A finish. Throughout the 2017–18 Serie A season, he appeared in every league match, playing every available minute as the club recorded 21 wins, nine draws and eight defeats, eventually finishing fifth and narrowly missing qualification for the UEFA Champions League following a decisive 3–2 home loss to Inter on the final matchday. By playing every minute of the Serie A season, he became only the second Lazio goalkeeper to achieve this feat, after Luca Marchegiani in 1998–99. On 14 October 2017, Strakosha saved a penalty in stoppage-time from Paulo Dybala in a 2–1 away win against Juventus, marking his first penalty save in Serie A and ending Juventus' unbeaten home league run since August 2015. On 24 September 2017, Strakosha kept a clean sheet in a 3–0 away victory over Verona, with his performance receiving positive reviews as Lazio continued their strong start to the Serie A season. On 21 October 2017, he was named the best young goalkeeper of 2017. On 30 December 2017, Strakosha kept a clean sheet in a goalless draw against Inter, and was described as the hero of the match due to his decisive saves. In the 2017–18 Coppa Italia, Strakosha conceded only once in the round of 16 before keeping clean sheets in both the quarter-finals and the two semi-final matches against Milan. On 28 February 2018, he was named man of the match after saving two penalties in the second-leg semi-final against Milan, although Lazio were eliminated following a 5–4 penalty shoot-out defeat. In the 2017–18 UEFA Europa League, Strakosha made four appearances during the group stage, all ending in victories for Lazio, before playing regularly throughout the knockout phase, featuring in all three two-legged knockout rounds up to the quarter-finals in April 2018, where Lazio were eliminated by Red Bull Salzburg following a 6–5 aggregate defeat after losing 4–1 in the second leg.

During the 2018–19 season, Strakosha made 44 appearances and played 3,990 minutes across all competitions, missing only three Serie A matches due to injury, while conceding 46 goals, keeping 13 clean sheets, and making more than 105 saves as Lazio won the 2018–19 Coppa Italia. In the 2018–19 Serie A, he recorded 10 clean sheets, ranking seventh among goalkeepers in the league. On 8 November 2018, Strakosha made several saves in Lazio's 2–1 victory over Marseille in the 2018–19 UEFA Europa League group stage, helping the club qualify for the knockout stage with two matches remaining. On 5 February 2019, Strakosha played a decisive role in Lazio's 1–0 Serie A victory over Frosinone, making a late save to preserve the result. Following his performances in the Derby della Capitale against Roma on 2 March 2019, Strakosha was voted the best under-23 player of the 26th Serie A round in a weekly poll organised by La Gazzetta dello Sport, after helping Lazio secure a clean sheet with several decisive saves despite playing through a shoulder injury. On 31 March 2019, Strakosha delivered a standout performance in a 1–0 away win against Inter, making several decisive saves as Lazio strengthened their challenge for a top-four finish in Serie A. On 2 April 2019, he was also described by Gianluca di Marzio as the best goalkeeper of the month in Serie A following a series of strong performances for Lazio. On 17 April 2019, Strakosha saved a penalty from Rodrigo De Paul in Lazio's 2–0 Serie A victory over Udinese, receiving praise from coach Inzaghi for his decisive contribution as Lazio continued their push for a Champions League place. Lazio ultimately finished eighth in the standings. In the Coppa Italia, Strakosha was ever-present for Lazio, conceding once in both the round of 16 and quarter-finals before keeping clean sheets in the two-legged semi-final against Milan, as Lazio progressed to the final with a 1–0 aggregate victory, and also in the 2–0 win over Atalanta on 15 May 2019 to secure the trophy. In June 2019, Premier League club Tottenham Hotspur were reported to be preparing a €30 million bid for Strakosha as they searched for a long-term successor to Hugo Lloris. On 22 December 2019, Strakosha produced several decisive saves in Lazio's 3–1 victory over Juventus in the 2019 Supercoppa Italiana, earning praise from the media for his performance against Cristiano Ronaldo.

In the 2019–20 Serie A, Strakosha played every available minute of the campaign, marking the second time in his career he achieved this feat after the 2017–18 season. On 18 January 2020, Strakosha participated in Lazio's 5–1 victory over Sampdoria, as the club recorded its 11th consecutive win in Serie A. At the time, Strakosha was considered one of the key players in Lazio's strong title challenge that season. Lazio spent much of the second half of the season in the top three of the standings, even reaching second place with 62 points, one behind leaders Juventus and five ahead of third-placed Inter, before the COVID-19 pandemic suspension of the league in March 2020. After the championship resumed between June and August 2020, a series of defeats saw Lazio finish fourth on 78 points, level with Atalanta but behind on head-to-head record, qualifying for the UEFA Champions League group stage.

During the 2020–21 season, Strakosha began the campaign as Lazio's starting goalkeeper, but after conceding nine goals in four Serie A matches following the opening clean sheet against Cagliari, he lost his place to veteran Pepe Reina following a COVID-19 infection and a series of injury problems, including hamstring and knee issues, which caused him to miss several matches. Reports indicated that his situation was influenced by recurring injury problems linked to a knee cartilage issue dating back to a youth injury at age 15, which affected his availability, contributed to the club's hesitation over renewing his contract, and ultimately led to expectations of his departure in the summer of 2021. Strakosha made his UEFA Champions League debut on 20 October 2020 in Lazio's 3–1 group-stage win over Borussia Dortmund in opening matchday, playing the full 90 minutes. Strakosha returned to the starting lineup in Serie A after a five-month absence on 12 May 2021, producing several decisive saves and keeping a clean sheet in a 1–0 win over Parma, a performance that helped revive his chances of regaining a regular place in the team. Strakosha made his final appearances of the season after Lazio had secured 6th place and qualification for the UEFA Europa League, featuring in the last two matches, keeping a clean sheet in a 0–0 draw against Torino and playing in a 2–0 defeat to Sassuolo in his ninth league appearance of the season.

During the 2021–22 season, Strakosha began the campaign as second-choice goalkeeper behind Pepe Reina in domestic competitions, but was deployed as the starting goalkeeper in the 2021–22 UEFA Europa League group stage, starting all six group-stage matches and making eight appearances overall in the competition. On 16 September 2021, he made an error in Lazio's 1–0 defeat to Galatasaray in the opening group-stage match, misjudging a cross and conceding the decisive goal. Strakosha kept clean sheets in all remaining group-stage matches except for a 2–2 draw against Marseille, as Lazio recorded two wins and three draws to qualify for the knockout phase, where they were narrowly eliminated 4–3 on aggregate by Porto. By December 2021, Strakosha regained his place in the starting lineup in Serie A amid the team's defensive struggles and Pepe Reina's inconsistent performances, with the club reportedly turning back to Strakosha following a run of 29 goals conceded in 15 league matches. In his first Serie A start after regaining his place, Strakosha produced several decisive saves in a 3–1 away win against Sampdoria on 5 December 2021, although uncertainty over his future at the club remained due to ongoing contract renewal discussions ahead of the expiration of his deal in June 2022, with reports indicating that Lazio remained open to extending his contract under certain conditions. Strakosha went on to play every remaining minute of the campaign, initially conceding in each of his first six matches despite Lazio recording three wins and one draw, before keeping four consecutive clean sheets as the team earned three 3–0 victories and one draw. Strakosha added three more clean sheets and finished the season in Serie A with 29 goals conceded in 23 appearances, as Lazio recorded 12 wins and six draws in matches he played to climb from ninth place to a fifth-place finish and secure qualification for the 2022–23 UEFA Europa League group stage.

In the summer of 2022, Strakosha left Lazio after the expiration of his contract, ending a ten-year spell at the club in which he made 208 appearances across all competitions.

=== Brentford ===
On 14 July 2022, Strakosha signed a three-year contract with Premier League club Brentford. Strakosha made his debut for the club on 23 August 2022 as a starter in a 2–0 away win over Colchester United in the 2022–23 EFL Cup second round, making four saves as the team advanced to the round of 32. Strakosha did not make a single Premier League appearance during the 2022–23 season due to strong competition from first-choice and Spain international David Raya, as well as a series of injuries which limited his availability, particularly between October 2022 and May 2023. On 7 January 2023, Strakosha started in a 0–1 home defeat against West Ham United in the third round of the 2022–23 FA Cup, as Brentford were eliminated from the competition. With only these two appearances in the domestic cup competitions, Strakosha concluded his first season in England.

He made his Premier League debut on 7 October 2023 in a 2–1 away defeat to Manchester United at Old Trafford. On 4 November 2023, Strakosha replaced the injured Mark Flekken at half-time in Brentford's 3–2 comeback victory over West Ham United in the league, keeping a clean sheet in the second half as Brentford overturned a 1–2 deficit by scoring twice after the break. In January 2024, Strakosha featured in both matches against Wolverhampton Wanderers in the third round of the 2023–24 FA Cup; after a 1–1 draw in the first match, Brentford were eliminated following a 3–2 defeat after extra time in the replay. In July 2024, Strakosha left Brentford after making six appearances and being named on the bench on 50 occasions during his two-year spell, joining Greek club AEK Athens on a free transfer.

=== AEK Athens ===
In July 2024, Strakosha moved to Super League Greece club AEK Athens on a free transfer. He signed a contract running until the summer of 2029, with an annual salary reported to exceed €1.2 million. He made his competitive debut on 24 July 2024, starting in a 4–3 home win over Inter Club d'Escaldes in the 2024–25 UEFA Conference League second qualifying round. During the match, he provided a long pass in the build-up to Levi García's goal for AEK's temporary 2–0 lead in the 20th minute, and later conceded a penalty in the second half, receiving a yellow card in the 76th minute, with the penalty converted to make the score 4–2. On 1 August 2024, Strakosha kept a clean sheet in a 4–0 second-leg victory, helping AEK Athens progress to the third qualifying round, where they faced Armenian club Noah. On 8 August 2024, Strakosha conceded a goal from a long clearance by the Noah goalkeeper in the first leg during AEK's 3–1 defeat. Although Strakosha kept another clean sheet in a 1–0 home win in the return leg, AEK was eliminated from European competition on aggregate. He made his league debut on 18 August 2024 in the opening match of the 2024–25 Super League Greece, keeping a clean sheet in a 3–0 home victory over OFI. During the opening phase of the league, Strakosha remained ever-present, conceding only one goal in AEK Athens' first six games as the club recorded four wins and two draws, before a three-match winless run in which he conceded once per match, followed by two consecutive victories with clean sheets in both games. In the following league match on 24 November 2024, Strakosha conceded four goals in a 4–1 away defeat against reigning champions Olympiacos, his highest number of goals conceded in a single match during the season. However, following that match, Strakosha conceded only six goals across the next 11 league matches, as AEK Athens recorded nine wins, one draw and one 0–1 defeat up to matchday 23 on 15 February 2025. On 26 February 2025, Strakosha played in the first leg of the 2024–25 Greek Cup semi-finals against Olympiacos, conceding six goals in a 6–0 away defeat, his highest number of goals conceded in a single match during the season and the second such record against the same opponent. Greek media noted that he was not directly responsible for any of the goals conceded, attributing the result largely to AEK's defensive performance. Although he also appeared in the 2–0 second-leg victory on 2 April 2025, Strakosha did not play another match for AEK Athens during the remainder of the season and remained on the bench, while the club was in second place with 49 points after matchday 23 of the league. Without Strakosha in the squad, AEK Athens collected four points in the final three matches of the regular season, before losing all six matches in the Championship Round and finishing fourth, although the club still qualified for the second qualifying round of the 2025–26 UEFA Conference League.

During the first half of the 2025–26 season, Strakosha established himself as undisputed first-choice goalkeeper in both domestic and European competitions, earning praise for his consistent performances and role in providing defensive stability for the team. On 28 November 2025, Strakosha delivered a standout performance in a 1–0 away victory over Fiorentina in the 2025–26 UEFA Conference League league phase, making several crucial saves and helping his side secure an important win at the Stadio Artemio Franchi, earning praise from the media for his display. On 1 December 2025, Strakosha played a key role in a 3–2 away victory over Panathinaikos in the Athenian derby, saving a penalty in the 28th minute. On 16 February 2026, Strakosha saved a penalty in the 12th minute in a goalless draw against PAOK, helping AEK Athens secure a point that kept the club at the top of the league standings. Strakosha made a total of three penalty saves, all in away matches. During the regular season of the 2025–26 Super League Greece, Strakosha played every minute in all 26 matches as AEK Athens recorded 20 wins, seven draws and only two consecutive defeats after mid-October 2025, both by a 2–0 scoreline against rivals PAOK and Olympiacos, with the club finishing top of the table on 60 points, two ahead of Olympiacos and three ahead of PAOK. In the opening three matches of the Championship Round, he kept three consecutive clean sheets as AEK Athens recorded two wins and one goalless draw. On 11 May 2026, Strakosha played in the fourth match and was confirmed as Super League champion after a dramatic derby victory over Panathinaikos, securing the league title with matches still remaining. On 2 November 2026, Strakosha was named the best goalkeeper of the season at the 45th annual Panhellenic Association of Professional Footballers (PSAPP) awards, in recognition of his contribution to AEK Athens' league title win.

== International career ==
Strakosha represented Albania at youth level from 2012 to 2016, starting with the U-17 side, continuing with the U-19 coached by his father Foto, and also featuring for the U-20 and U-21, where he debuted at the age of 18 as one of the youngest players and served as captain.

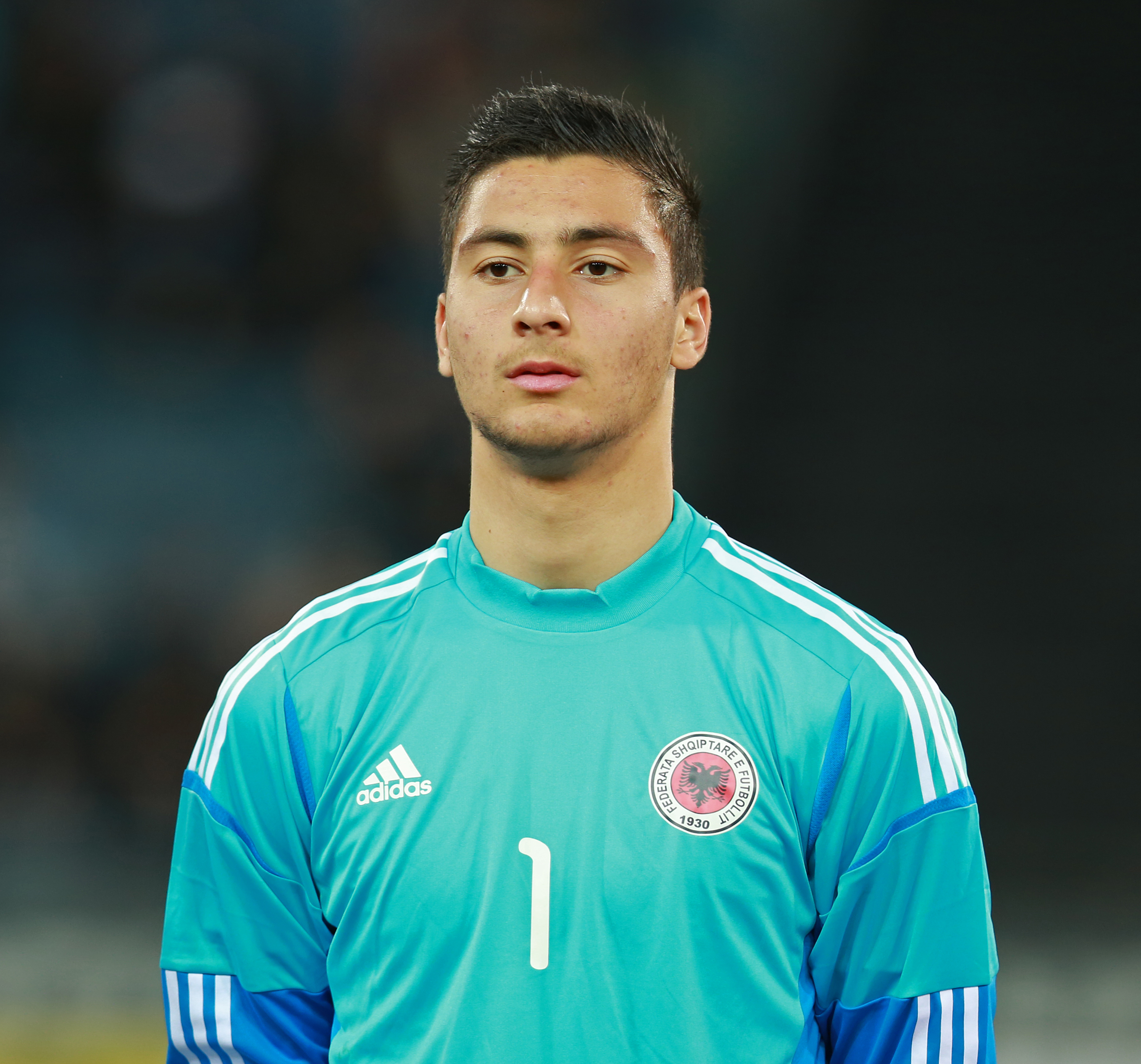
Strakosha playing for Albania U-21 in 2014

Strakosha received his first call-up to the Albania senior squad in August 2016 by coach Gianni De Biasi for a friendly against Morocco on 31 August 2016 and the opening 2018 FIFA World Cup qualification match against Macedonia on 5 September 2016, but as fourth-choice goalkeeper he was not included in the matchday squads and made no appearances. Strakosha remained part of the national team in the second half of the 2016–17 season and, following Etrit Berisha's two-match suspension in November 2016, he was selected ahead of more experienced goalkeepers to start and played the full 90 minutes in a World Cup qualifier against Italy on 24 March 2017, a 2–0 defeat. He also started in the following match, keeping a clean sheet in a 3–0 win over Israel on 11 June 2017. After Berisha's return from suspension and the appointment of Christian Panucci as head coach, Strakosha returned to the bench for the remainder of the campaign, with Albania finishing third in the group with 13 points.

In the inaugural UEFA Nations League, Strakosha played in Albania's first three matches in League C, keeping a clean sheet in a 1–0 win over Israel on 7 September 2018, before conceding twice in each of the next two 0–2 defeats to Scotland and Israel. In the final group match against Scotland, Strakosha remained on the bench as Albania lost 4–0 and finished bottom of Group 1. In the Euro 2020 qualifiers under coach Edoardo Reja, he played four full matches between September and October 2019, with Albania recording wins over Iceland (4–2) and Moldova (4–0), and defeats to France (1–4) and Turkey (0–1), as Albania finished fourth in the group with 13 points and failed to reach the play-offs. In the 2020–21 UEFA Nations League C, Strakosha featured in Albania's opening two matches in September 2020, playing in a 2–0 away win over Belarus and a 0–1 home defeat to Lithuania, as Albania later topped the group and earned promotion to League B for the first time. During the 2022 World Cup qualifiers, Strakosha played in three of Albania's eight matches, keeping clean sheets in wins over San Marino (5–0) and Andorra (1–0), but conceding five goals in a 5–0 defeat to England, as Albania finished third in the group, two points behind Poland, and missed the play-offs. In the 2022–23 UEFA Nations League B, after Berisha played in the opening two matches, Strakosha featured in the return fixtures against Israel and Iceland, as Albania recorded a 2–1 defeat and a 1–1 draw and finished bottom of the group.

In the UEFA Euro 2024 qualifying Group E under coach Sylvinho, Strakosha played in three of Albania's eight matches, keeping two clean sheets, including a 2–0 win over Poland on 10 September 2023, while conceding only once against the same opponent in the opening 1–0 defeat. On 17 October 2023, he captained Albania for the first time in a friendly against Bulgaria, leading the team to a 2–0 win. Albania finished top of the group for the first time in its history with 15 points, level with the Czech Republic but ahead on head-to-head record, qualifying for the European Championship finals for the second time. He was included in Albania's 26-man squad for the final tournament in Germany. At Euro 2024, Strakosha was selected as a starter ahead Etrit Berisha played all three group-stage matches, conceding five goals against Italy, Croatia and Spain as Albania finished bottom of the group with one point and were eliminated. Following the exclusion of Etrit Berisha, Strakosha became Albania's first-choice goalkeeper and played every minute of the 2024–25 UEFA Nations League B, keeping two clean sheets and conceding six goals across six matches, with Albania finishing bottom of the group and being relegated after a tightly contested campaign.

During the 2026 FIFA World Cup qualification (UEFA) campaign, Strakosha was almost ever-present for Albania in Group K, missing only the final minutes of one match due to a minor injury; he kept five clean sheets, conceded five goals, and helped Albania record four wins and two draws, securing a play-off spot for the first time in their history one match before the end of the group; Albania ultimately finished second with 14 points, one ahead of third-placed Serbia. In the play-off round, Strakosha played the full match as Albania initially took the lead, but Poland came back to win 2–1, eliminating Albania from qualification.

== Personal life ==
Strakosha was born in Athens, Greece, to Albanian parents from Memaliaj and holds dual citizenship for Greece and Albania. His father, Foto Strakosha, was also a goalkeeper who played for clubs in Albania and Greece and represented the Albania national team between 1990 and 2005, while his mother, Adelina, is his long-time spouse. He also has an older brother Dhimitri who played football at an amateur level but did not pursue a professional career.

In a 2017 interview, Thomas stated that his main influence and idol as a goalkeeper was his father, whom he has tried to emulate.

== Career statistics ==
=== Club ===
As of match played 21 November 2026

Appearances and goals by club, season and competition
Club	Season	League			National cup (Note: Includes Coppa Italia, FA Cup, Greek Cup)		League cup (Note: Includes EFL Cup)		Europe		Other		Total	
Club	Season	Division	Apps	Goals	Apps	Goals	Apps	Goals	Apps	Goals	Apps	Goals	Apps	Goals
Lazio	2012–13	Serie A	0	0	0	0	—		0	0	—		0	0
Lazio	2013–14	Serie A	0	0	0	0	—		0	0	0	0	0	0
Lazio	2014–15	Serie A	0	0	0	0	—		—		—		0	0
Lazio	2016–17	Serie A	21	0	4	0	—		—		—		25	0
Lazio	2017–18	Serie A	38	0	4	0	—		10 (Note: Appearances in UEFA Europa League)	0	1 (Note: Appearance in Supercoppa Italiana)	0	53	0
Lazio	2018–19	Serie A	35	0	5	0	—		4	0	—		44	0
Lazio	2019–20	Serie A	38	0	1	0	—		4	0	1	0	44	0
Lazio	2020–21	Serie A	9	0	1	0	—		1 (Note: Appearance in UEFA Champions League)	0	—		11	0
Lazio	2021–22	Serie A	23	0	0	0	—		8	0	—		31	0
Lazio	Total		164	0	15	0	—		27	0	2	0	208	0
Salernitana (loan)	2015–16	Serie B	11	0	2	0	—		—		—		13	0
Brentford	2022–23	Premier League	0	0	1	0	1	0	—		—		2	0
Brentford	2023–24	Premier League	2	0	2	0	0	0	—		—		4	0
Brentford	Total		2	0	3	0	1	0	—		—		6	0
AEK Athens	2024–25	Super League Greece	23	0	2	0	—		4 (Note: Appearances in UEFA Conference League)	0	—		29	0
AEK Athens	2025–26	Super League Greece	30	0	0	0	—		16	0	—		46	0
AEK Athens	2026–27	Super League Greece	4	0	0	0	—		1	0	1 (Note: Appearance in Greek Super Cup)	0	6	0
AEK Athens	Total		57	0	2	0	0	0	21	0	1	0	81	0
Career total			234	0	22	0	1	0	48	0	3	0	306	0

=== International ===
As of match played 31 March 2026

Appearances and goals by national team and year
National team	Year	Apps	Goals
Albania	2017	4	0
Albania	2018	4	0
Albania	2019	4	0
Albania	2020	2	0
Albania	2021	4	0
Albania	2022	3	0
Albania	2023	4	0
Albania	2024	12	0
Albania	2025	8	0
Albania	2026	2	0
Total		47	0

== Honours ==
Lazio

- Coppa Italia: 2012–13, 2018–19
- Supercoppa Italiana: 2017, 2019

AEK Athens

- Super League Greece: 2025–26

Individual

- Best Goalkeeper of the Season: 2025–26
