= 2013 Coppa Italia final =

65th Coppa Italia final
- Event: 2012–13 Coppa Italia
Roma	Lazio
0	1
- Date: 26 May 2013
- Venue: Stadio Olimpico, Rome
- Referee: Daniele Orsato
- Attendance: 70,000
- Weather: Clear; 16 °C (61 °F)

The 2013 Coppa Italia final was the final match of the 2012–13 Coppa Italia, the top cup competition in Italian football. The match was played at the Stadio Olimpico in Rome between Lazio and Roma on Sunday, 26 May 2013 at 18:00 CET.

Lazio had played 7 Coppa Italia finals and Roma 16, but the two sides had never met each other in the final prior to this match. Since the final was always played at the Stadio Olimpico independent of which teams were going to play, it was the first Derby della Capitale in a Coppa Italia final, when both Rome teams played at their home stadium in their home city, and the third local derby after the Turin derby in 1938 and the Milan derby in 1977. Roma was officially declared the home team for this match. "Gangnam Style" singer Psy had a pregame performance, in which he was mercilessly booed.

Lazio won the match 1–0 with a goal by Senad Lulić in the 71st minute, a low right footed shot from a low cross from the right by Antonio Candreva after the goalkeeper Bogdan Lobonț failed to cut out the crossed ball.

== Road to the final ==
Roma		Round	Lazio
Opponent	Result	2012–13 Coppa Italia	Opponent	Result
Atalanta	3–0 (H)	Round of 16	Siena	1–1 (4–1 pen.) (H)
Fiorentina	1–0 (a.e.t.) (A)	Quarter-finals	Catania	3–0 (H)
Internazionale	2–1 (H), 3–2 (A) (5–3 agg.)	Semi-finals	Juventus	1–1 (A), 2–1 (H) (3–2 agg.)

== Match ==
=== Details ===
26 May 2013
18:00 CEST

Roma	0–1	Lazio
	Report	Lulić 71'

Stadio Olimpico, Rome
Attendance: 70,000
Referee: Daniele Orsato

Roma	Lazio

GK	1	(Romania) Bogdan Lobonț
RB	3	(Brazil) Marquinhos
CB	5	(Brazil) Leandro Castán
CB	29	(Argentina) Nicolás Burdisso	(yellow card) 87'
LB	42	(Italy) Federico Balzaretti	(yellow card) 11'	(substituted off) 76'
CM	4	(United States) Michael Bradley
CM	16	(Italy) Daniele De Rossi
RW	8	(Argentina) Erik Lamela
AM	10	(Italy) Francesco Totti (c)	(yellow card) 91'
LW	7	(Brazil) Marquinho	(yellow card) 26'	(substituted off) 83'
CF	22	(Italy) Mattia Destro
Substitutes:
DF	27	(Brazil) Dodô		(substituted in) 83'
FW	9	(Italy) Dani Osvaldo		(substituted in) 76'
Manager:
(Italy) Aurelio Andreazzoli

GK	22	(Italy) Federico Marchetti
RB	29	(France) Abdoulay Konko
CB	20	(Italy) Giuseppe Biava
CB	27	(Albania) Lorik Cana
LB	26	(Romania) Ștefan Radu
DM	24	(Italy) Cristian Ledesma (c)	(yellow card) 1'	(substituted off) 54'
RM	87	(Italy) Antonio Candreva
CM	8	(Brazil) Hernanes	(yellow card) 32'	(substituted off) 84'
CM	23	(Nigeria) Ogenyi Onazi		(substituted off) 90+2'
LM	19	(Bosnia and Herzegovina) Senad Lulić	(yellow card) 75'
CF	11	(Germany) Miroslav Klose	(yellow card) 39'
Substitutes:
DF	2	(France) Michaël Ciani		(substituted in) 90+2'
MF	6	(Italy) Stefano Mauri		(substituted in) 54'
MF	15	(Uruguay) Álvaro González		(substituted in) 84'
Manager:
(Switzerland) Vladimir Petković

== See also ==
- 2012–13 SS Lazio season
- 2012–13 AS Roma season
