= Hernanes =

Brazilian footballer (born 1985)

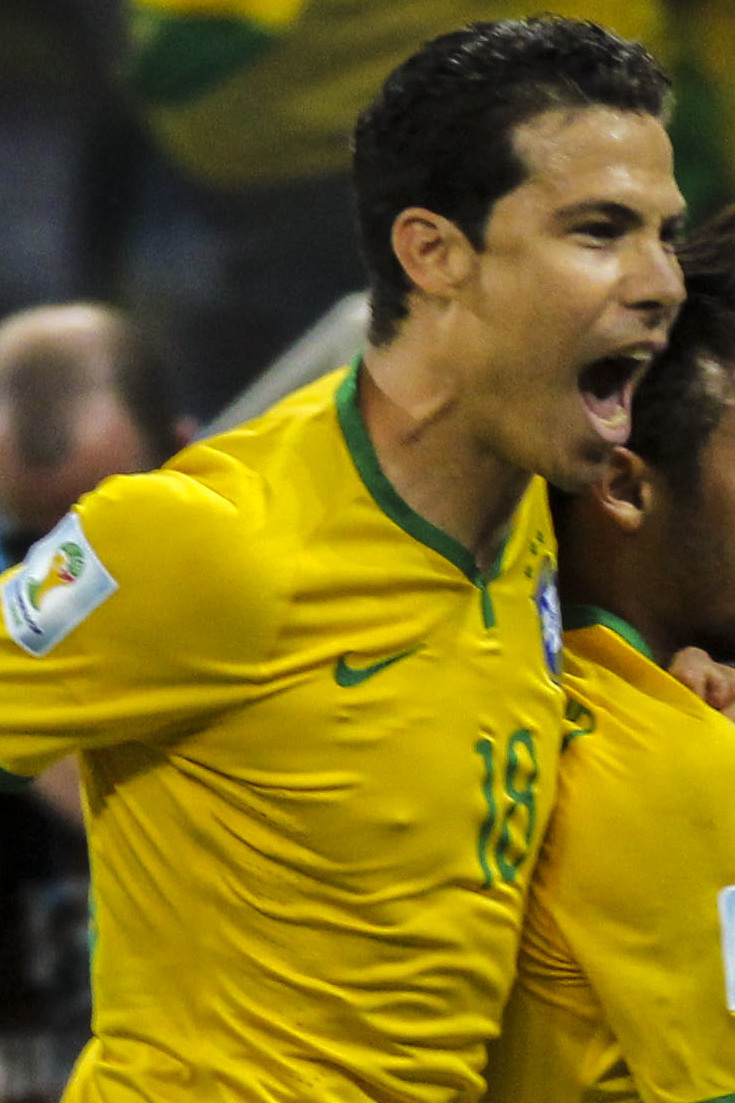
- Hernanes with Brazil at the 2014 FIFA World Cup

Personal information
- Full name: Anderson Hernanes de Carvalho Viana Lima
- Date of birth: 29 May 1985 (age 41)
- Place of birth: Recife, Brazil
- Height: 1.80 m (5 ft 11 in)
- Position: Midfielder

Youth career
- 1996–1998: Santa Cruz
- 1999–2000: Unibol
- 2001–2005: São Paulo

Senior career*
Years	Team	Apps	(Gls)
2004–2010	São Paulo	117	(18)
2006	→ Santo André (loan)	23	(6)
2010–2014	Lazio	118	(33)
2014–2015	Inter Milan	42	(7)
2015–2017	Juventus	24	(2)
2017–2018	Hebei China Fortune	19	(4)
2017	→ São Paulo (loan)	19	(9)
2019–2021	São Paulo	46	(5)
2021	Sport Recife	8	(0)

International career
2008	Brazil U23	7	(1)
2008–2014	Brazil	27	(2)
Medal record
Men's football
Representing Brazil
Olympic Games
Bronze medal – third place	2008 Beijing	Team
FIFA Confederations Cup
Winner	2013 Brazil
- * Club domestic league appearances and goals

Anderson Hernanes de Carvalho Viana Lima (born 29 May 1985), known as Hernanes (Brazilian Portuguese: [eʁˈnɐ̃nis]), is a Brazilian former professional footballer who played as a central or attacking midfielder.

Hernanes began his career with São Paulo, where he won the Campeonato Brasileiro Série A in 2007 and 2008. In August 2010, he joined Italian side Lazio, whom he helped win the Coppa Italia in 2013. He transferred to Inter Milan in January 2014 for €20 million, then moved to Juventus in 2015, where he won the domestic double in his first season with the club. He moved to Hebei China Fortune in 2017, before returning to São Paulo.

Hernanes has earned 27 caps for the Brazil national team since 2008, scoring two goals. He won a bronze medal at that year's Olympics and was also part of the senior squads which won the 2013 FIFA Confederations Cup and came in fourth at the 2014 FIFA World Cup. He is nicknamed "Il Profeta" ("The Prophet") in Italy.

== Club career ==
=== São Paulo ===
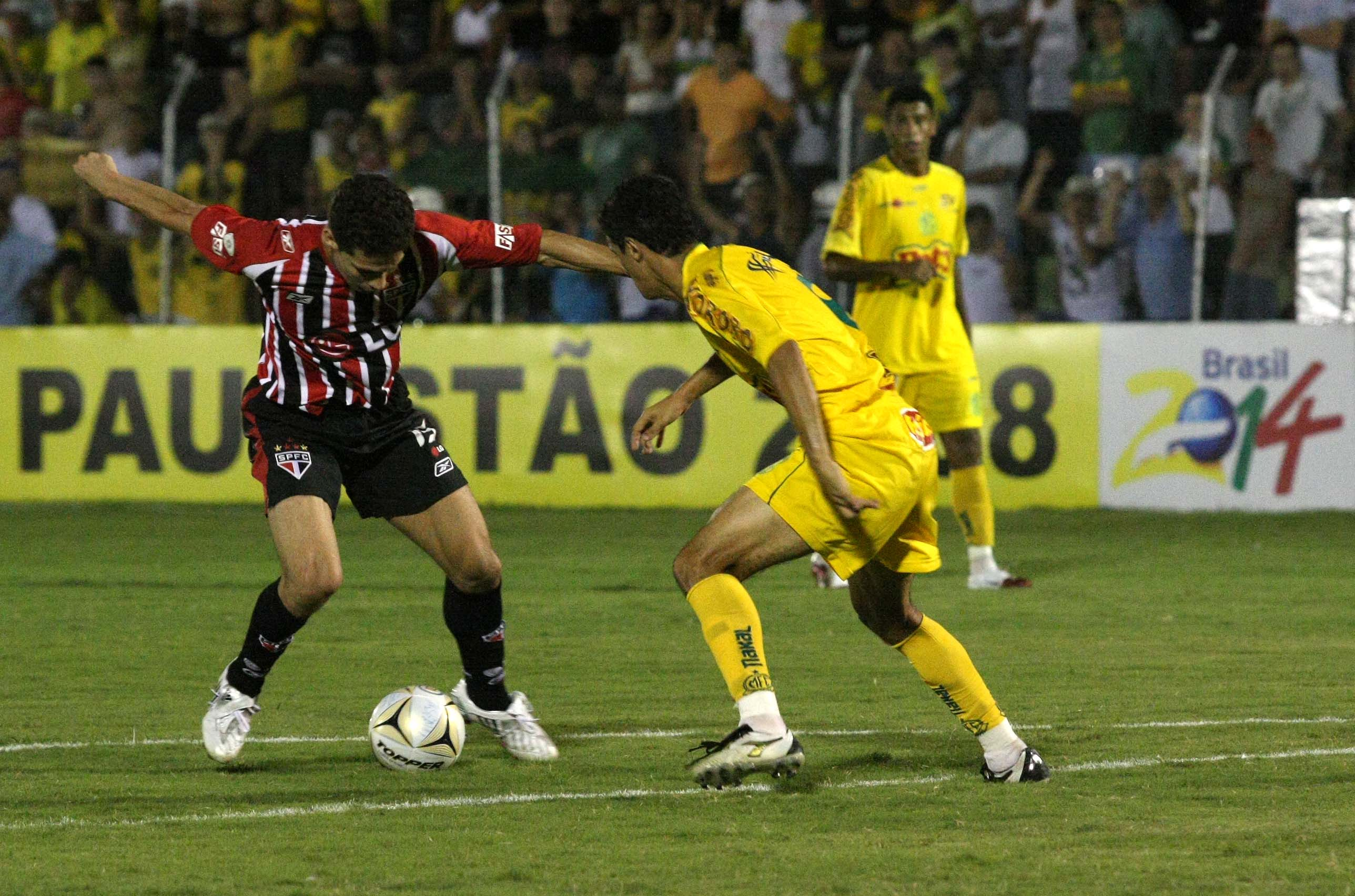
Hernanes playing for São Paulo in March 2008

Born in Recife, Hernanes is a product of the academy at São Paulo, where he played for nine years between 2001 and 2010. He was loaned out to Santo André for the 2006 season, while in 2008, as a São Paulo player, Hernanes won the Prêmio Craque do Brasileirão's best player award. In January 2009, Hernanes was listed as the most promising football player in the world by British newspaper The Times.

=== Lazio ===
On 6 August 2010, São Paulo agreed to sell Hernanes to Italian side Lazio. Hernanes signed a five-year contract. Lazio paid an €11.1 million transfer fee to São Paulo and third-party owner Traffic Group.

Hernanes scored on his debut, converting a penalty in a friendly against Deportivo de La Coruña, having previously been brought down in the penalty area. He also assisted Sergio Floccari for Lazio's third goal. His first Serie A goal was also on a penalty, against Bologna in another 3–1 victory. On 3 December 2010, he scored the third goal in a 3–1 win over Inter Milan with a free-kick. He concluded the season with 11 goals, equal to Lazio's best goal-scoring return from midfield in one season, alongside Pavel Nedvěd. Hernanes later helped the club win the 2013 Coppa Italia Final against rivals Roma.

=== Inter Milan ===
On 31 January 2014, Hernanes joined Inter Milan, completing a permanent switch from Lazio by signing a four-and-a-half-year contract expiring 30 June 2018. His move was rumoured to be due to money motivation, a motive that was denied by Hernanes. Lazio club president Claudio Lotito claimed he sold Hernanes after Inter had triggered the buy-out clause of €20 million in Hernanes' contract, opting to sell him rather than let him later leave on a free transfer. As a result, Lazio fans were unhappy over Hernanes' sale and protested Lotito's action.

Hernanes made his Inter debut on 9 February in a 1–0 win over Sassuolo, assisting a goal scored by Walter Samuel. On 10 May, he scored a long-distance strike against former club Lazio to seal a 4–1 victory which also meant that Inter would play in the UEFA Europa League in the following season.

=== Juventus ===
On 31 August 2015, Hernanes joined Juventus in a €11 million transfer deal. He made his debut for the club on 12 September in a 1–1 Serie A home draw against Chievo. On 1 May 2016, he scored his first goal for the club, opening the scoring of a 2–0 home win over Carpi.

=== Hebei China Fortune ===
On 9 February 2017, Hernanes was sold to Hebei China Fortune for €8 million, with a possible €2 million in variables from Juventus.

=== Return to São Paulo ===
On 19 July 2017, Hernanes re-signed for São Paulo on a loan deal. Hernanes came backed under a great shape to the club, and has helped Tricolor in their fight against relegation: in his first five games he scored five goals, being a fundamental part of the team.

On 29 December 2018, Hernanes signed for São Paulo on a three-year deal.

=== Sport Club do Recife and Retirement ===
After terminating with São Paulo, he was officially announced by Sport Club do Recife on 3 August 2021.

On 2 May 2022, he announced his retirement from professional football.

== International career ==
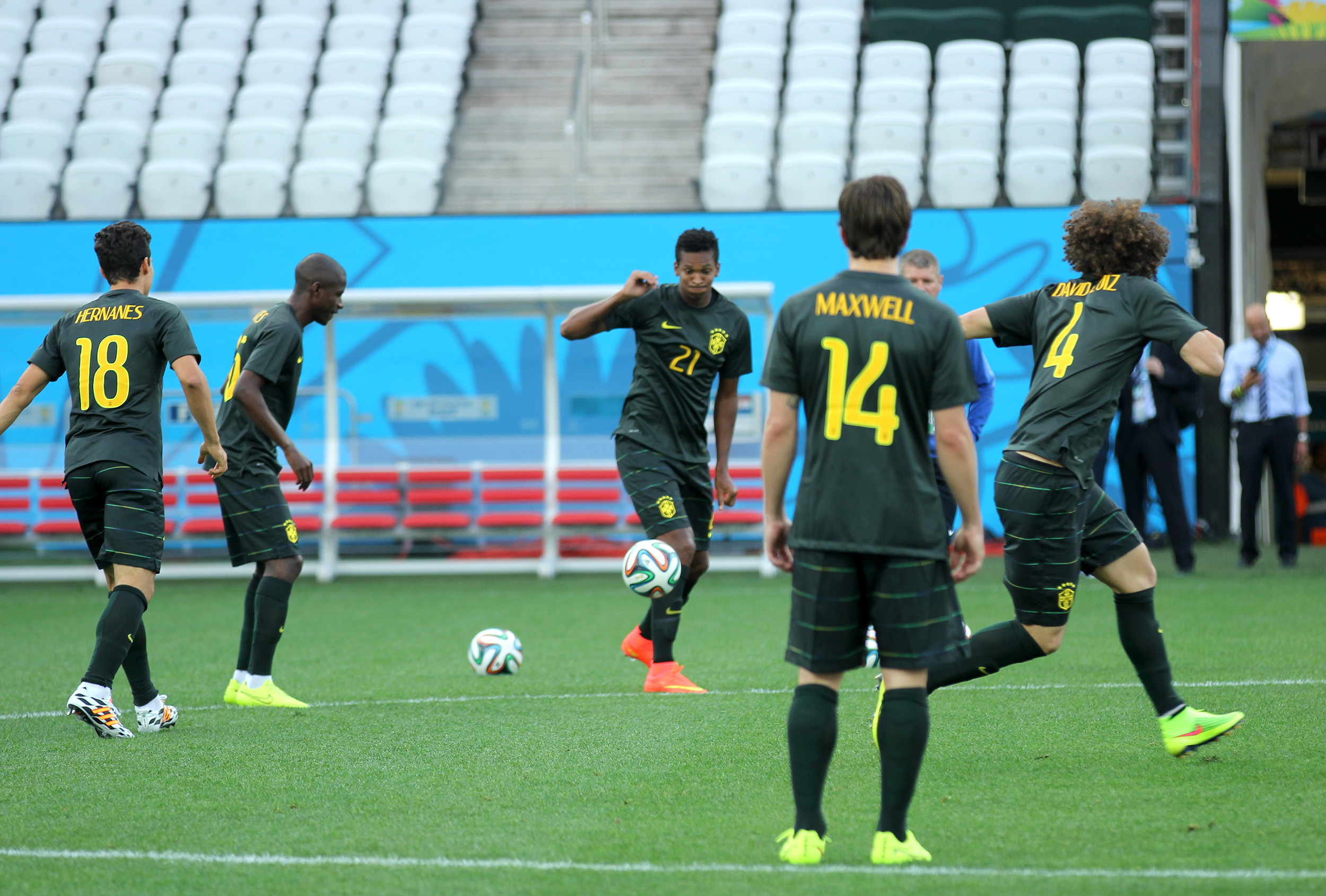
Hernanes (left) training with Ramires, Jô, Maxwell and David Luiz before the match against Croatia at the 2014 FIFA World Cup on 11 June

In March 2008, Hernanes was called up to the Brazil senior side, and earned his first cap that year, in a 1–0 friendly win over Sweden, held in London, on 26 March. Later that year, he was a member of the Brazil under-23 side that won a bronze medal at the 2008 Summer Olympics in Beijing. During the tournament, he scored the only goal in Brazil's opening win against Belgium on 7 August; Brazil were eliminated by eventual champions Argentina in the semi-finals on 19 August, following a 3–0 defeat, but went on to capture the bronze medal after defeating Belgium once again three days later, by a score of 3–0.

He returned to the senior team two years later, appearing in a 2–0 friendly away victory over United States on 10 August 2010.

On 9 February 2011, Hernanes was sent off in the first half of a 1–0 friendly defeat against France in Paris, for kicking Karim Benzema in the chest. Later that year, on 10 November, he scored his first international goal, Brazil's second goal in a 0–2 win over Gabon in Libreville after reaching the ball from the goalkeeper's parry.

Hernanes was selected by Luiz Felipe Scolari for the 2013 FIFA Confederations Cup on home soil. In a warm-up match against France on 9 June in Porto Alegre, he replaced Luiz Gustavo in the 81st minute and four minutes later scored the second goal of a 3–0 win. Hernanes appeared in all of Brazil's matches as they won the tournament, but only started the final group match against Italy on 22 June, which ended in a 4–2 victory to the hosts.

Hernanes was also included in the nation's squad for the 2014 FIFA World Cup. He made three brief substitute appearances as Brazil came fourth, starting in the opening match against Croatia, where he replaced Paulinho for the last 27 minutes of a 3–1 win.

== Style of play ==
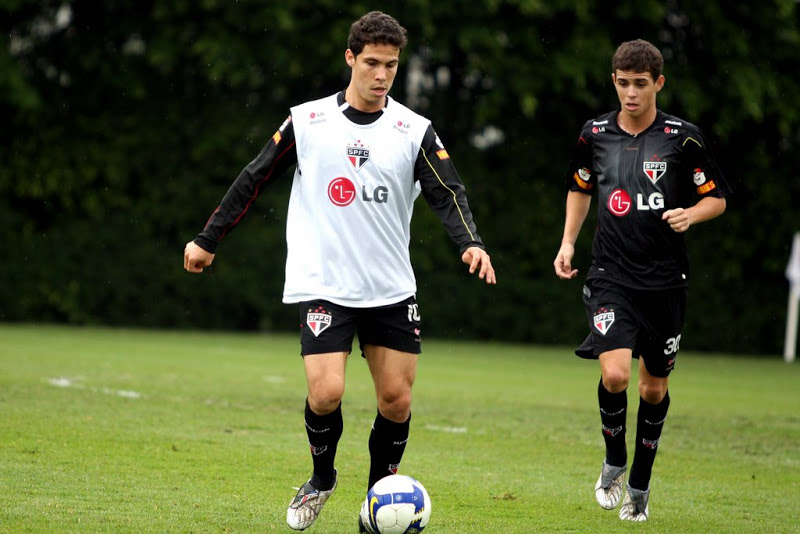
Hernanes and Oscar in training with São Paulo in 2009

A hard-working and versatile player, Hernanes can cover all midfield positions, and has been used as an attacking midfielder, as a central midfielder, and as a deep-lying playmaker. Although he is not particularly quick, he is a dynamic and energetic player that is effective at making attacking runs and who possesses good physical attributes; moreover, he is known for his defensive contribution, and his willingness to press opposing players. He is known for being neat and tidy in possession, with the ability to pass the ball accurately out wide in order to stretch play or create chances for teammates. Hernanes is highly regarded for his creativity and technical skills: his double step is one of the most popular in the world; he is also an accurate and powerful striker of the ball from distance with either foot, despite being naturally right-footed, as well as being a threat from set-pieces, with his left as well as his "stronger" right foot, uniquely.

Due to his playmaking ability, he has been compared to Andrea Pirlo, and Kaká, the latter with whom he has a close friendship. Regarded as a promising player in his youth, former Brazil international midfielder Edmílson defined Hernanes as the new Deco, while in 2009, he was elected the best Under-23 player in the world by The Times; that same year, Hernanes won the Bola de Prata award, being included in the Brazilian team of the year. During his first season in Italy, he was named by ESPN as the best emerging Brazilian player in Europe. Despite his talent, however, he has been accused by some in the sport of being inconsistent.

== Personal life ==
Hernanes is married and a father of four children. He is a Christian.

São Paulo fans have dedicated a mural to Hernanes inside Estádio do Morumbi.

== Career statistics ==
=== Club ===
Appearances and goals by club, season and competition
Club	Season	League			National cup (Note: Includes Copa do Brasil, Coppa Italia, Chinese FA Cup)		Continental		Other		Total	
Club	Season	Division	Apps	Goals	Apps	Goals	Apps	Goals	Apps	Goals	Apps	Goals
São Paulo	2005	Série A	18	3	8	1	5 (Note: Appearances in Copa Sudamericana)	1	0	0	31	5
São Paulo	2007	Série A	31	3	0	0	6	1	7	1	44	5
São Paulo	2008	Série A	24	4	0	0	11 (Note: Appearances in Copa Libertadores)	0	19	3	53	7
São Paulo	2009	Série A	33	6	0	0	7	0	18	4	58	10
São Paulo	2010	Série A	11	2	0	0	12	2	19	6	42	10
São Paulo	Total		117	18	8	1	41	4	63	14	228	37
Santo André (loan)	2006	Série B	23	6	8	1	—		—		31	7
Lazio	2010–11	Serie A	36	11	1	1	—		—		37	12
Lazio	2011–12	Serie A	31	8	2	1	9 (Note: Appearances in UEFA Europa League)	2	—		42	11
Lazio	2012–13	Serie A	34	11	5	2	14	1	—		53	14
Lazio	2013–14	Serie A	15	2	0	0	6	1	1 (Note: Appearance in Supercoppa Italiana)	0	22	3
Lazio	Total		116	32	8	4	29	4	1	0	154	40
Inter Milan	2013–14	Serie A	14	2	0	0	—		—		14	2
Inter Milan	2014–15	Serie A	26	5	1	0	9	0	—		36	5
Inter Milan	2015–16	Serie A	2	0	—		—		—		2	0
Inter Milan	Total		42	7	1	0	9	0	—		52	7
Juventus	2015–16	Serie A	14	1	3	0	5 (Note: Appearance(s) in UEFA Champions League)	0	0	0	22	1
Juventus	2016–17	Serie A	9	1	0	0	1	0	0	0	10	1
Juventus	Total		23	2	3	0	6	0	0	0	32	2
Hebei Fortune	2017	Chinese Super League	6	1	2	0	—		—		8	1
Hebei Fortune	2018	Chinese Super League	13	3	1	1	—		—		14	4
Hebei Fortune	Total		19	4	3	1	—		—		22	5
São Paulo (loan)	2017	Série A	19	9	0	0	0	0	0	0	19	9
Career total			360	78	78	15	86	10	65	14	589	107

=== International ===
As of 12 July 2014

Brazil
Year	Apps	Goals
2008	1	0
2010	1	0
2011	5	1
2012	1	0
2013	15	1
2014	4	0
Total	27	2

== Honours ==
São Paulo

- Campeonato Brasileiro Série A: 2007, 2008
- Campeonato Paulista: 2021

Lazio

- Coppa Italia: 2012–13

Juventus

- Serie A: 2015–16
- Coppa Italia: 2015–16

Brazil U23

- Summer Olympics bronze: 2008

Brazil

- FIFA Confederations Cup: 2013

Individual

- Bola de Prata: 2007, 2008, 2017
- Campeonato Brasileiro Série A Team of the Year: 2007, 2008, 2009, 2017
- Campeonato Brasileiro Série A Best Player: 2008
- Troféu Mesa Redonda Best Player: 2008, 2017
