= Enrico Zampa =

Italian footballer (born 1992)

Personal information
- Date of birth: 18 March 1992 (age 34)
- Place of birth: Frascati, Italy
- Height: 1.78 m (5 ft 10 in)
- Position: Defensive midfielder

Team information
- Current team: Taranto

Senior career*
Years	Team	Apps	(Gls)
2011–2012	Lazio	1	(0)
2012–2014	Salernitana	22	(0)
2014	→ Feralpisalò (loan)	8	(0)
2014–2015	Lazio	0	(0)
2014–2015	→ Trapani (loan)	18	(0)
2015–2016	Ternana	17	(0)
2016–2017	Ancona	34	(0)
2017–2020	Monopoli	54	(1)
2019–2020	→ Rieti (loan)	22	(0)
2020–2022	Potenza	34	(2)
2022	Turris	15	(0)
2022	Brindisi	10	(2)
2022–2023	Turris	15	(0)
2023–2024	Siracusa	27	(3)
2024–2025	Matera	16	(0)
2025	L'Aquila	13	(0)
2025–	Taranto		

International career
2011–2012	Italy U-20	1	(0)
- * Club domestic league appearances and goals as of 7 December 2025

Enrico Zampa (born 18 March 1992) is an Italian footballer who plays as a defensive midfielder for Eccellenza club Taranto.

== Club career ==
On 2 September 2019, he joined Rieti on loan.

On 3 January 2022, he signed with Turris until the end of the 2021–22 season, with an option to extend.

On 5 August 2022, Zampa moved to Brindisi in Serie D.
