= Ettore Mendicino =

Italian footballer (born 1990)

Personal information
- Date of birth: 11 February 1990 (age 36)
- Place of birth: Milan, Italy
- Height: 1.84 m (6 ft 0 in)
- Position: Striker

Youth career
- Lazio

Senior career*
| Years | Team | Apps | (Gls) |
| 2008–2015 | Lazio | 4 | (0) |
| 2009–2010 | → Crotone (loan) | 22 | (2) |
| 2010–2011 | → Ascoli (loan) | 24 | (3) |
| 2011–2012 | → Gubbio (loan) | 13 | (2) |
| 2012 | → Taranto (loan) | 7 | (0) |
| 2013 | → Como (loan) | 16 | (6) |
| 2013–2015 | → Salernitana (loan) | 48 | (13) |
| 2015–2017 | Robur Siena | 39 | (8) |
| 2016 | → Arezzo (loan) | 11 | (1) |
| 2017–2018 | Cosenza | 39 | (9) |
| 2018 | → Monza (loan) | 16 | (1) |
| 2018–2020 | Monopoli | 28 | (3) |
| 2020 | Rimini | 6 | (0) |
| 2020–2021 | Paganese | 28 | (2) |
| 2021 | Sambenedettese | 9 | (0) |
| 2021–2022 | Ravenna | 22 | (1) |
| 2022–2024 | LUISS | | |

International career
| 2006 | Italy U-16 | 5 | (1) |
| 2008–2009 | Italy U-18 | 6 | (0) |
| 2009 | Italy U-21 | 1 | (0) |
- * Club domestic league appearances and goals as of 22 May 2022

Ettore Mendicino (born 11 February 1990) is an Italian footballer who plays as a striker.

== Club career ==
=== Lazio ===
Born in Milan, Mendicino began his career in Rome with the successful Lazio youth system. Playing as a centre-forward and earmarked as a potential future-Luca Toni, Mendicino was touted as a key member of Lazio's future.

Mendicino was first promoted to the Lazio first time during the 2007–08 season, yet did not make a senior debut.

At the beginning of the 2008–09 season, Mendicino played for the first team in pre-season friendlies, having a goal wrongfully disallowed against Liverpool at Anfield.

On 8 February 2009, Mendicino made his Serie A debut, coming on as an injury time substitute for Cristian Ledesma in Lazio's 1–0 loss to Fiorentina.

Lazio loaned him to Serie B side Crotone for the 2009–10 season to gain experience. He scored for the club against Modena on 15 November 2009.

During the summer transfer of 2010, Lazio loaned him to Ascoli with the option to switch from loan to 50% co-ownership for €1.5 Million euros. He made his debut during Coppa Italia return match on 15 August 2010 against Lumezzane scoring the first goal of the match just after 6 minutes, whilst he played his first competitive Serie B game for Ascoli on 22 August 2010 in their 0–0 tie against Grosseto.

On 4 July 2013, he moved on loan to Lega Pro Prima Divisione club Salernitana.

On 10 January 2020, he signed with Serie C club Rimini until the end of the season. The contract was to be automatically extended unless the club got relegated, which they were.

On 1 October 2020 he joined Paganese.

On 27 September 2021 he moved to Sambenedettese in Serie D.

== International career ==
On 25 March 2009 Mendicino made his debut with the Italy U-21 squad in a friendly match against Austria.
