= Antonio Rozzi =

Italian footballer (born 1994)

Personal information
- Full name: Antonio Rozzi
- Date of birth: 28 May 1994 (age 32)
- Place of birth: Rome, Italy
- Height: 1.81 m (5 ft 11 in)
- Position: Forward

Team information
- Current team: Sancataldese Calcio
- Number: 17

Youth career
- Lazio

Senior career*
Years	Team	Apps	(Gls)
2012–2018	Lazio	3	(0)
2013–2014	→ Real Madrid B (loan)	10	(0)
2014–2015	→ Bari (loan)	9	(0)
2015	→ Virtus Entella (loan)	6	(0)
2015–2016	→ Lanciano (loan)	1	(0)
2016	→ Siena (loan)	11	(0)
2016–2017	→ Lupa Roma (loan)	10	(0)
2018–2019	Qormi	11	(4)
2020–2021	Trastevere	1	(0)
2021–2022	Sant Julià		
2023–2024	Ferentino		
2024–2025	ASD Parioli Calcio		
2025–	Sancataldese Calcio	0	(0)

International career
2008–2010	Italy U16	2	(0)
2010–2011	Italy U17	2	(1)
2011–2012	Italy U18	9	(0)
2011–2012	Italy U19	7	(3)
2014–2015	Italy U20	4	(1)
2013	Italy U21	4	(1)
- * Club domestic league appearances and goals as of 15 February 2026

Antonio Rozzi (born 28 May 1994) is an Italian professional footballer who plays as a forward for Sancataldese Calcio.

== Club career ==
=== Lazio ===
Rozzi was first promoted to the Lazio first team during the 2011–12 season, making his Serie A debut in Lazio's first league win over Milan for 14 years. He came on as an injury time substitute for captain Tommaso Rocchi.

==== Loans ====
Rozzi joined Real Madrid Castilla on loan from 2 September 2013.

On 31 July 2014 he joined Bari. On 23 January 2015 he joined Virtus Entella.

On 3 August 2015 he moved to Lanciano. In January 2016 he was signed by Siena.

On 31 August 2016 Rozzi was signed by Lupa Roma in another loan.

== Statistics ==
Statistics accurate as of match played 1 July 2013

Club	Season	League		Cup		Europe		Other		Total	
Club	Season	Apps	Goals	Apps	Goals	Apps	Goals	Apps	Goals	Apps	Goals
Lazio	2010–11	0	0	0	0	0	0	0	0	0	0
Lazio	2011–12	3	0	0	0	1	0	0	0	4	0
Lazio	2012–13	0	0	1	0	3	0	0	0	4	0
Lazio	Total	3	0	1	0	4	0	0	0	8	0
Real Madrid B	2013–14	0	0	0	0	0	0	0	0	0	0
Real Madrid B	Total	0	0	0	0	0	0	0	0	0	0
Career totals		3	0	1	0	4	0	0	0	8	0
