= Michaël Ciani =

French footballer (born 1984)

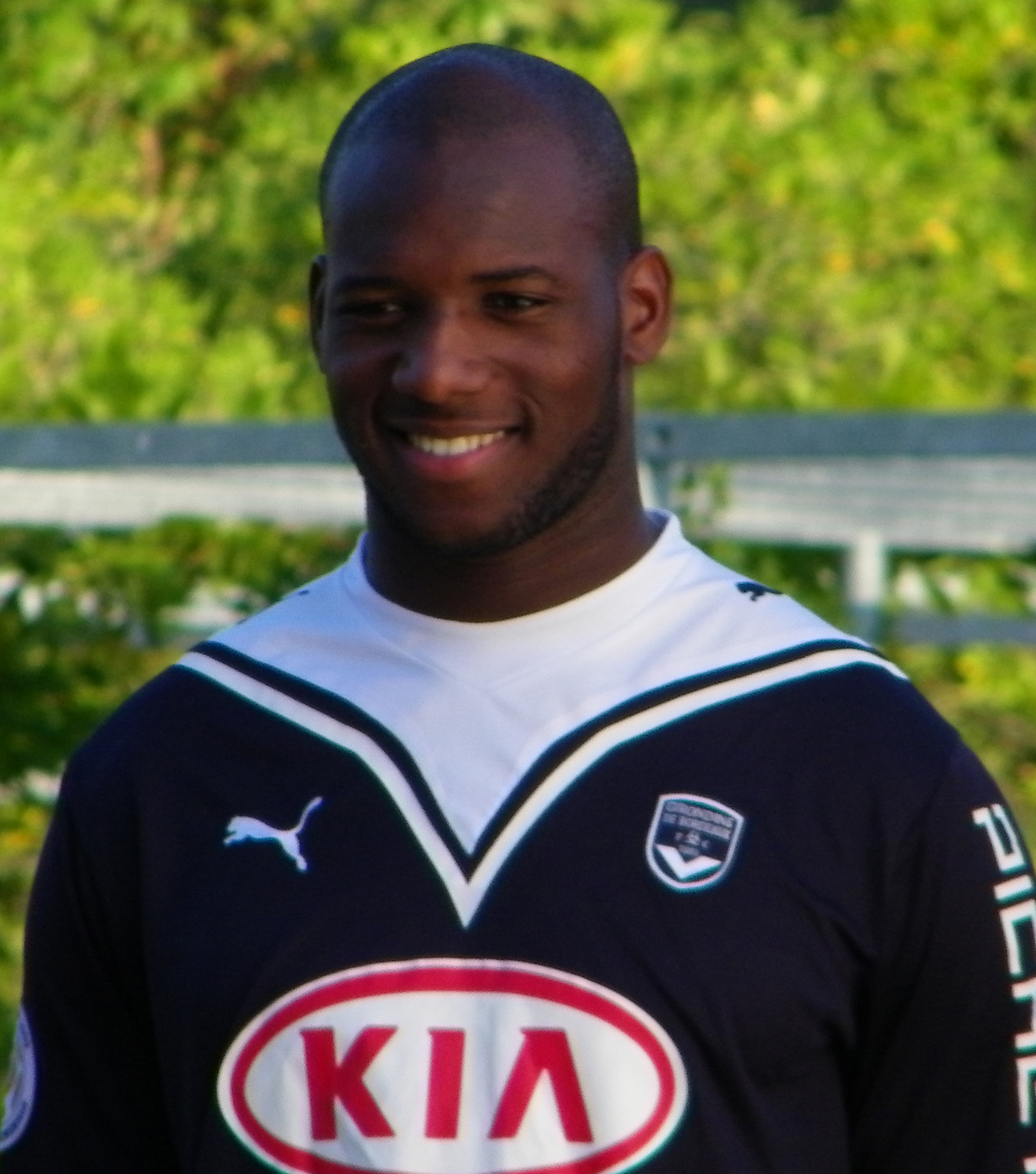

Personal information
- Full name: Michaël Henry Ciani
- Date of birth: 6 April 1984 (age 42)
- Place of birth: Clichy-la-Garenne, Hauts-de-Seine, France
- Height: 1.89 m (6 ft 2 in)
- Position: Centre back

Youth career
- 1996–2000: ES Colombes
- 2000–2001: Racing Paris

Senior career*
Years	Team	Apps	(Gls)
2001–2003	Racing Paris	1	(0)
2003–2004	Charleroi	18	(1)
2004–2005	Auxerre	0	(0)
2005–2006	Sedan	37	(3)
2006–2009	Lorient	98	(5)
2009–2012	Bordeaux	91	(6)
2012–2015	Lazio	48	(1)
2015	Sporting CP	0	(0)
2015–2016	Espanyol	3	(0)
2016–2017	Lorient	24	(3)
2017–2018	LA Galaxy	27	(2)
Total		347	(21)

International career
2003–2004	France U21	5	(0)
2010	France	1	(0)
- * Club domestic league appearances and goals

Michaël Henry Ciani (born 6 April 1984) is a French former professional footballer who played as a centre back.

== Club career ==
His performances during the 2008–09 season led to increased speculation that Ciani would sign with another club with the player preferring a move to the Premier League over Ligue 1 contenders Bordeaux and Paris Saint-Germain.

On 28 July 2009, Ciani and Bordeaux reached an agreement on a four-year contract with the Aquitaine-based club paying Lorient €4 million for his services. The defender was recruited by Laurent Blanc as a replacement for the departed Souleymane Diawara who joined Marseille.

On 18 July 2015, Ciani reached an agreement on a two-year contract with Sporting CP after his three-year contract with Lazio ended. Roughly one month later, however, he signed a two-year deal with Espanyol.

On 31 August 2016, after only three matches for the Pericos, Ciani rescinded his contract.

On 2 September 2017, Ciani was signed by MLS club LA Galaxy as a free agent. Ciani scored his first goal for the Galaxy against FC Dallas on 22 October 2017. Ciani was released by LA Galaxy at the end of their 2018 season.

On 20 October 2019, 35-year old Ciani announced his retirement.

== International career ==
Ciani made his international debut for France in 2010.
