= Giuseppe Biava =

Italian retired footballer

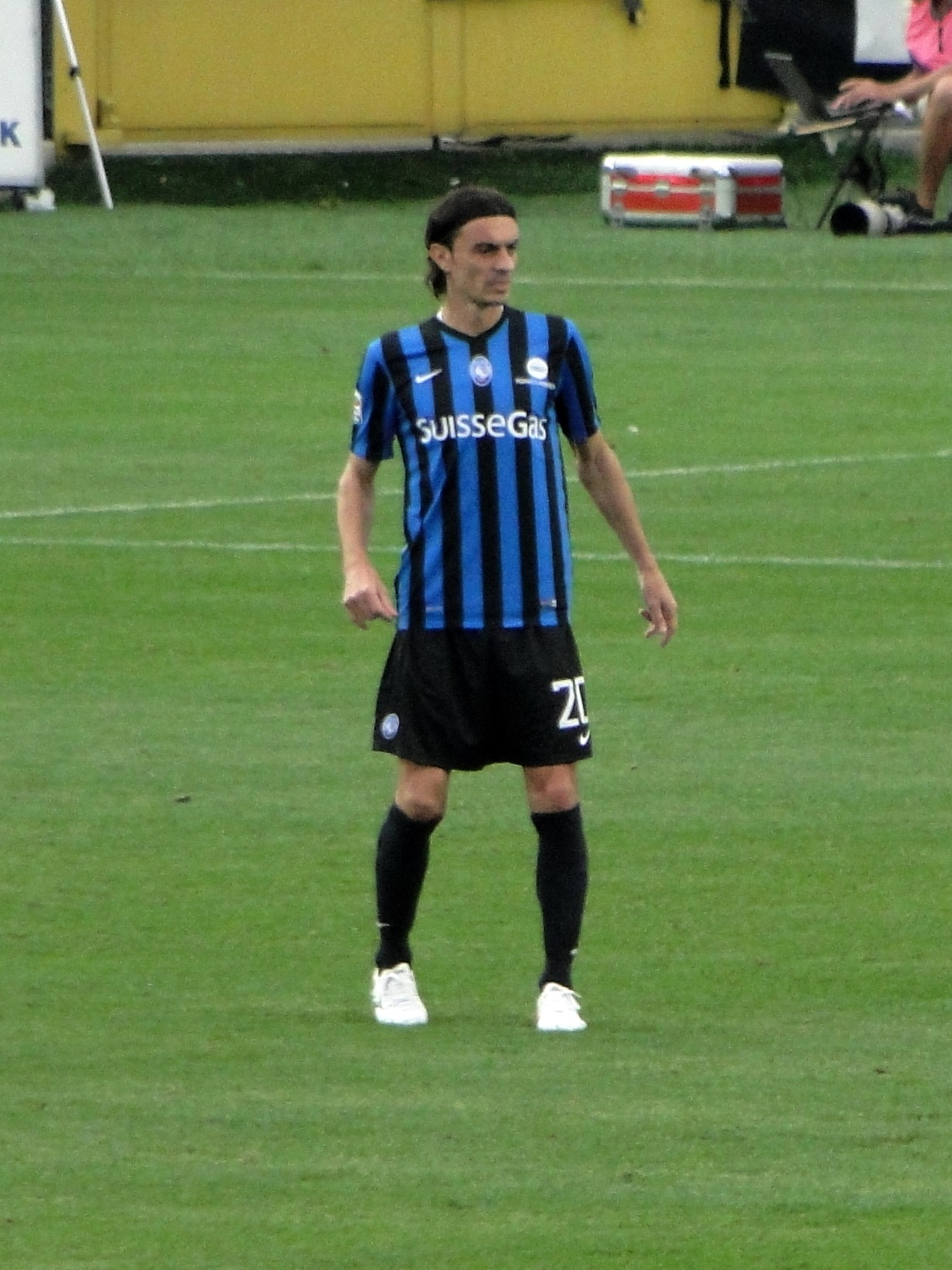
- Biava with Atalanta in 2014

Personal information
- Date of birth: 8 May 1977 (age 49)
- Place of birth: Seriate, Italy
- Height: 1.80 m (5 ft 11 in)
- Position: Centre-back

Team information
- Current team: Atalanta Under-23 (assistant)

Youth career
- 1992–1995: Leffe

Senior career*
Years	Team	Apps	(Gls)
1995–1998	Albinese	69	(0)
1998–2004	AlbinoLeffe	131	(6)
2000–2001	→ Biellese (loan)	23	(0)
2004–2008	Palermo	112	(5)
2008–2010	Genoa	48	(3)
2010–2014	Lazio	125	(6)
2014–2015	Atalanta	18	(2)
Total		508	(20)

Managerial career
- 2022–2023: AlbinoLeffe
- * Club domestic league appearances and goals

Giuseppe Biava (born 8 May 1977) is an Italian football coach and former player who played as a centre-back. Throughout his career he played for Italian clubs Albinese, AlbinoLeffe, Biellese, Palermo, Genoa, Lazio, and Atalanta; he won a Coppa Italia with Lazio in 2013.

He is currently in charge as assistant coach of Atalanta Under-23.

== Club career ==
=== AlbinoLeffe ===
A centre back, Biava started his career with the Leffe youth team, before moving to newly promoted Serie D team Albinese in 1995. During his time with Albinese before the 1998 merger with the Leffe to found AlbinoLeffe, Biava achieved a promotion to Serie C2 in 1997. In 1998–99, Biava helped AlbinoLeffe to ensure promotion to Serie C1. After a one-year loan at Serie C2 side Biellese, Biava returned to AlbinoLeffe in 2001, and was part of the team that won the promotion playoffs in 2003, thus ensuring them a Serie B place.

In 2003–04, Biava marked his Serie B debut, and scored the goal which ensured the first AlbinoLeffe victory in the league, a 1–0 win against Fiorentina.

=== Palermo ===
His performances in the league provoked interest from Serie B club Palermo, which signed him during the January 2004 transfer window. Biava immediately gained a place in the regular lineup, forming a defensive line together with Pietro Accardi and leading the rosanero back to Serie A after over 30 years.

Biava was confirmed by head coach Francesco Guidolin as a key player during the 2004–05 season, coincidentally his first season in the top flight, which ended with a historical first qualification for Palermo in the UEFA Cup. However, he did not confirm his performances in the following season, where he was mostly featured as backup player. With Guidolin back at the helm of Palermo in 2006–07, Biava regained a more important role in the Palermo squad, returning to play at his usual levels.

During the summer 2007, Biava refused an offer from his childhood team Atalanta, preferring instead to stay at Palermo even though the club management could not ensure him a place as a regular. He successively agreed a contract extension with the rosanero until June 2009.

=== Genoa ===
In June 2008 Biava was sold to Genoa for €500,000, with Cesare Bovo moving the opposite way. At Genoa, he quickly established himself as a regular for the rossoblu. In their 2008–09 Serie A campaign ending in fifth place he partnered with Salvatore Bocchetti and/or Matteo Ferrari. In the first half of 2009–10 season he often partnered with Bocchetti but in January faced competition in new signing Dario Dainelli while the team's coach preferred a 3–5–2 formation with 3 central defenders and 2 wing-backs.

=== Lazio ===
On 1 February 2010, Biava joined Lazio for a transfer fee of €800,000 (including other costs Lazio paid a total of €1.04 million). Along with new signing André Dias, he became the backbone of the Lazio team starting in 11 matches in the second half of the 2009–10 season and helped the club survive the relegation battle.

In the 2010–11 season Biava made 36 appearances, guiding Lazio to a strong 5th-place finish.

In the 2011–12 season, Biava was limited to 31 appearances due to muscle issues.

He made a career-high 43 appearances in all competitions in the 2012–13 season, leading Lazio to the quarter-finals of 2012–13 UEFA Europa League where they were knocked out by Fenerbahçe, and helped Lazio defeat traditional rivals A.S. Roma to win the 2012–13 Coppa Italia.

Biava missed large portions of the first half of the 2013–14 season, but finished the season strongly, making 24 appearances in all competitions.

=== Atalanta ===
On 17 July 2014, Biava signed for home province club Atalanta B.C. as a free agent.

== Coaching career ==
In 2016, Biava took on his first coaching role as a youth coach at Pontisola. He successively accepted an offer as a youth coach at AlbinoLeffe in 2017. Under his tenure, he led the Under-19 to promotion to Campionato Primavera 2, the second-highest tier in Italian youth football leagues.

On 23 June 2022, AlbinoLeffe announced to have promoted Biava as head coach for the 2022–23 Serie C campaign, with former Giana Erminio boss Raul Bertarelli as his assistant. He was dismissed on 21 February 2023.

On 6 August 2023, Biava was announced as Francesco Modesto's assistant in charge of the inaugural Atalanta Under-23 team for the 2023–24 Serie C season.

== Honours ==
Lazio

- Coppa Italia: 2012–13
