= 2017–18 SS Lazio season =

Lazio
2017–18 season
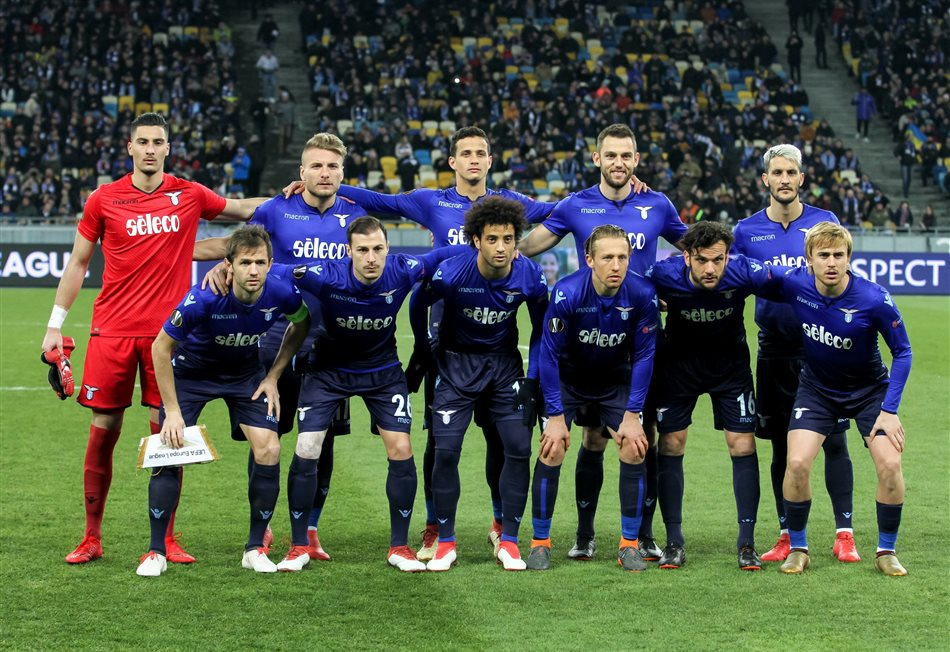
- Lazio players lining up before a UEFA Europa League match against Dynamo Kyiv in March 2018
- President: Claudio Lotito
- Manager: Simone Inzaghi
- Stadium: Stadio Olimpico
- Serie A: 5th
- Coppa Italia: Semi-finals
- Supercoppa Italiana: Winners
- UEFA Europa League: Quarter-finals
- Top goalscorer: League: Ciro Immobile (29); All: Ciro Immobile (41)
- Highest home attendance: 68,000 vs Internazionale (20 May 2018, Serie A)
- Lowest home attendance: 300 vs Zulte Waregem (28 September 2017, Europa League)
- Average home league attendance: 30,990
- Biggest win: 6–1 vs Sassuolo
- Biggest defeat: 1–4 vs Napoli; 1–4 vs Napoli; 1–4 vs Salzburg
Home colours	Away colours	Third colours

The 2017–18 season was the 117th season in Società Sportiva Lazio's history and their 30th consecutive season in the top-flight of Italian football. Lazio competed in Serie A, the Coppa Italia and the Europa League.

== Players ==
=== Squad information ===
As of 28 February 2018

Note: Flags indicate national team as defined under FIFA eligibility rules; some limited exceptions apply. Players may hold more than one non-FIFA nationality.

No.	Pos.	Nation	Player
1	GK	ALB	Thomas Strakosha
3	DF	NED	Stefan de Vrij
4	DF	ESP	Patric
5	DF	BEL	Jordan Lukaku
6	MF	BRA	Lucas Leiva
7	MF	POR	Nani (on loan from Valencia)
8	DF	SRB	Dušan Basta
9	FW	SRB	Filip Đorđević
10	MF	BRA	Felipe Anderson
11	MF	ITA	Luca Crecco
13	DF	BRA	Wallace
15	DF	ANG	Bastos
16	MF	ITA	Marco Parolo (Vice-captain)
17	FW	ITA	Ciro Immobile
18	MF	ESP	Luis Alberto
19	MF	BIH	Senad Lulić (Captain)
20	FW	ECU	Felipe Caicedo

No.	Pos.	Nation	Player
21	MF	SRB	Sergej Milinković-Savić
22	DF	URU	Martín Cáceres
23	GK	ITA	Guido Guerrieri
26	DF	ROU	Ștefan Radu
27	DF	BRA	Luiz Felipe
30	FW	POR	Pedro Neto (on loan from Braga)
32	MF	ITA	Alessio Miceli
34	FW	COL	Brayan Perea
55	GK	CRO	Ivan Vargić
66	MF	POR	Bruno Jordão (on loan from Braga)
77	DF	MNE	Adam Marušić
88	MF	ITA	Davide Di Gennaro
96	MF	ITA	Alessandro Murgia
99	MF	FIN	Abukar Mohamed
—	GK	ITA	Federico Marchetti

== Transfers ==
=== In ===
Date	Pos.	Player	Age	Moving from	Fee	Notes	Source
1 July 2017	DF	(Montenegro) Adam Marušić	24	(Belgium) Oostende			
18 July 2017	MF	(Brazil) Lucas Leiva	30	(England) Liverpool	€5.5M		
21 July 2017	MF	(Italy) Davide Di Gennaro	29	(Italy) Cagliari			
2 August 2017	FW	(Ecuador) Felipe Caicedo	28	(Spain) Espanyol			
8 January 2018	DF	(Uruguay) Martín Cáceres	30	(Italy) Hellas Verona			

==== Loans in ====
Date	Pos.	Player	Age	Moving from	Fee	Notes	Source
31 August 2017	FW	(Portugal) Nani	30	(Spain) Valencia		Loan with an option to buy	
31 August 2017	MF	(Portugal) Bruno Jordão	18	(Portugal) Braga		Loan with an obligation to buy	
31 August 2017	FW	(Portugal) Pedro Neto	17	(Portugal) Braga		Loan with an obligation to buy	

=== Out ===
Date	Pos.	Player	Age	Moving to	Fee	Notes	Source
16 July 2017	MF	(Argentina) Lucas Biglia	31	(Italy) Milan	€17M	Plus €3M in variables	
22 August 2017	DF	(Netherlands) Wesley Hoedt	23	(England) Southampton	€17M		
29 August 2017	FW	(Senegal) Keita Baldé	22	(France) Monaco	€30M	Plus €5M in variables	

==== Loans out ====
Date	Pos.	Player	Age	Moving to	Fee	Notes	Source
19 July 2017	MF	(Italy) Danilo Cataldi	22	(Italy) Benevento		On loan until the end of the season	
31 August 2017	FW	(Netherlands) Ricardo Kishna	22	(Netherlands) ADO Den Haag		On loan until the end of the season	
31 August 2017	MF	(England) Ravel Morrison	24	(Mexico) Club Atlas		On loan with an obligation to buy due to apps	
31 August 2017	FW	(Italy) Cristiano Lombardi	22	(Italy) Benevento		On loan until the end of the season	
9 January 2018	FW	(Italy) Simone Palombi	30	(Italy) Salernitana		On loan until the end of the season with option to buy	
31 January 2018	MF	(Australia) Chris Ikonomidis	31	(Australia) Western Sydney Wanderers		On loan until the end of the season	
28 February 2018	DF	(Brazil) Maurício	29	(Poland) Legia Warsaw		On loan until the end of the season	

== Pre-season and friendlies ==
12 July 2017 Friendly	Lazio	16–0	Auronzo	Auronzo di Cadore, Italy
17:00 CEST (UTC+2)	Keita 6', 15', 20', 40', 41', 45'; Felipe Anderson 8'; Milinković-Savić 25'; Crecco 43'; Murgia 47'; Ikonomidis 55', 67'; Rossi 60', 81'; Palombi 82', 85'	Report		Stadium: Stadio Rodolfo Zandegiacomo; Referee: Andrea Zanonato

16 July 2017 Friendly	Lazio	9–1	Top 11 Radio Club	Auronzo di Cadore, Italy
17:00 CEST (UTC+2)	Immobile 5', 21'; Marušić 27'; Lulić 28'; Felipe Anderson 43' (pen.); Palombi 58'; Lombardi 66'; Bastos 78'; Đorđević 87'	Report	Sansoni 68'	Stadium: Stadio Rodolfo Zandegiacomo; Referee: Sergio Palmieri

19 July 2017 Friendly	Lazio	3–0	Triestina	Auronzo di Cadore, Italy
17:00 CEST (UTC+2)	Bastos 36'; Immobile 40'; Patric 74'	Report		Stadium: Stadio Rodolfo Zandegiacomo; Referee: Marco Zufferli

22 July 2017 Friendly	Lazio	2–0	SPAL	Auronzo di Cadore, Italy
17:00 CEST (UTC+2)	Immobile 44'; Keita 86' (pen.)	Report		Stadium: Stadio Rodolfo Zandegiacomo; Referee: Livio Marinelli

30 July 2017 Friendly	Bayer Leverkusen (Germany)	1–3	(Italy) Lazio	Grödig, Austria
15:30 CEST (UTC+2)	Yurchenko 90'	Report	Immobile 19', 56'; Felipe Anderson 41'	Stadium: Untersberg-Arena; Referee: Sebastian Gishamer

1 August 2017 Friendly	Kufstein (Austria)	1–13	(Italy) Lazio	Kufstein, Austria
18:00 CEST (UTC+2)	Bicer 25'	Report	Patric 5', 40'; Keita 8', 47'; Palombi 10', 31', 64'; Rossi 68', 87'; Crecco 72'; Luis Alberto 74'; Bastos 79'; Immobile 90'	Stadium: Kufstein Arena; Referee: Christoph Hofer

5 August 2017 Trofeo Costa del Sol	Málaga (Spain)	0–1	(Italy) Lazio	Málaga, Spain
20:30 CEST (UTC+2)		Report	Immobile 55'	Stadium: La Rosaleda Stadium; Referee: Melero López

== Competitions ==
=== Supercoppa Italiana ===
13 August 2017	Juventus	2–3	Lazio	Rome
20:45 CEST	Buffon (yellow card) 31'; Mandžukić (yellow card) 52'; Pjanić (yellow card) 73'; Dybala 85', 90+1' (pen.)	Report	Immobile 32' (pen.), 54', (yellow card) 89'; Lucas (yellow card) 41'; Lulić (yellow card) 70'; Parolo (yellow card) 84'; Murgia 90+3'	Stadium: Stadio Olimpico; Attendance: 52,000; Referee: Davide Massa

=== Serie A ===
==== League table ====
Pos	Team	Pld	W	D	L	GF	GA	GD	Pts	Qualification or relegation
3	Roma	38	23	8	7	61	28	+33	77	Qualification to Champions League group stage
4	Internazionale	38	20	12	6	66	30	+36	72	Qualification to Champions League group stage
5	Lazio	38	21	9	8	89	49	+40	72 (Note: Internazionale finished ahead of Lazio on head-to-head: Internazionale 0–0 Lazio, Lazio 2–3 Internazionale)	Qualification to Europa League group stage (Note: Since the winners of the 2017–18 Coppa Italia, Juventus, qualified for European competition based on league position, the spot awarded to the cup winners (Europa League group stage) was passed to the sixth-placed team and the spot awarded to the sixth-placed team (Europa League second qualifying round) was passed to the seventh-placed team.)
6	Milan (Note: Milan was originally banned from European competition due to violations against Financial Fair Play regulations. They appealed to the Court of Arbitration for Sport, and the ban was overturned on 20 July 2018.)	38	18	10	10	56	42	+14	64	Qualification to Europa League group stage
7	Atalanta	38	16	12	10	57	39	+18	60	Qualification to Europa League second qualifying round

Source: Serie A, Soccerway
Rules for classification: 1) Points; 2) Head-to-head points; 3) Head-to-head goal difference; 4) Goal difference; 5) Goals scored; 6) Draw.

==== Results summary ====
Overall								Home						Away					
Pld	W	D	L	GF	GA	GD	Pts	W	D	L	GF	GA	GD	W	D	L	GF	GA	GD
38	21	9	8	89	49	+40	72	9	5	5	45	21	+24	12	4	3	44	28	+16

Last updated: 20 May 2018.
Source: Competitive matches

==== Results by round ====
Round	1	2	3	4	5	6	7	8	9	10	11	12	13	14	15	16	17	18	19	20	21	22	23	24	25	26	27	28	29	30	31	32	33	34	35	36	37	38
Ground	H	A	H	A	H	A	H	A	H	A	A	H	A	H	A	H	A	H	A	A	H	A	H	A	H	A	H	A	H	H	A	H	A	H	A	H	A	H
Result	D	W	W	W	L	W	W	W	W	W	W	W	L	D	W	L	D	W	D	W	W	L	L	L	W	W	L	D	D	W	W	D	W	W	W	D	D	L
Position	12	9	4	4	7	4	4	4	4	4	4	4	5	5	5	5	5	5	5	4	3	3	3	5	4	3	4	4	5	5	3	4	4	4	4	4	4	5

Updated to match(es) played on 20 May 2018. Source: Competitive matches
A = Away; H = Home; W = Win; D = Draw; L = Loss

==== Matches ====
20 August 2017 1	Lazio	0–0	SPAL	Rome
20:45 CEST (UTC+02:00)	Luis Alberto (yellow card) 28'; Wallace (yellow card) 51'	Report	Borriello (yellow card) 75'; Viviani (yellow card) 90'	Stadium: Stadio Olimpico; Attendance: 25,000; Referee: Rosario Abisso

27 August 2017 2	Chievo	1–2	Lazio	Verona
20:45 CEST (UTC+02:00)	Pucciarelli 34'; Birsa (yellow card) 67'	Report	Immobile 11'; Wallace (yellow card) 66'; Milinković-Savić 89'	Stadium: Stadio Marc'Antonio Bentegodi; Attendance: 10,000; Referee: Gianluca Manganiello

10 September 2017 3	Lazio	4–1	Milan	Rome
CEST (UTC+02:00)	Immobile 38' (pen.), 42', 48'; Luis Alberto 49'; Lulić (yellow card) 58'; Parolo (yellow card) 70' (yellow-red card) 90+3'	Report	Montolivo 56'; Bonaventura (yellow card) 88'	Stadium: Stadio Olimpico; Attendance: 30,000; Referee: Gianluca Rocchi

17 September 2017 4	Genoa	2–3	Lazio	Genoa
20:45 CEST (UTC+02:00)	Rosi (yellow card) 39'; Pellegri 57', 73'	Report	Bastos 13'; De Vrij (yellow card) 46'; Immobile 70', 82'; Luis Alberto (yellow card) 87'	Stadium: Stadio Luigi Ferraris; Attendance: 19,065; Referee: Daniele Orsato

20 September 2017 5	Lazio	1–4	Napoli	Rome
CEST (UTC+02:00)	Radu (yellow card) 21'; De Vrij 29'; Lucas (yellow card) 79'	Report	Mertens (yellow card) 25', (goal) 59'; Reina (yellow card) 34'; Koulibaly 54'; Callejón 56'; Jorginho (yellow card) 70', (goal) 90+2' (pen.)	Stadium: Stadio Olimpico; Attendance: 28,000; Referee: Antonio Damato

24 September 2017 6	Hellas Verona	0–3	Lazio	Verona
CEST (UTC+02:00)	Kean (yellow card) 51'; Fossati (yellow card) 80'	Report	Parolo (yellow card) 15'; Immobile 24' (pen.), 40'; Marušić 60', (yellow card) 74'	Stadium: Stadio Marc'Antonio Bentegodi; Attendance: 16,316; Referee: Massimiliano Irrati

1 October 2017 7	Lazio	6–1	Sassuolo	Rome
CEST (UTC+02:00)	De Vrij (yellow card) 26', (goal) 56'; Luis Alberto 45+1', 57'; Immobile (yellow card) 53', (goal) 81' (pen.); Parolo 64', 69'	Report	Berardi (yellow card) 24', (goal) 27' (pen.); Adjapong (yellow card) 32'; Sensi (yellow card) 45'	Stadium: Stadio Olimpico; Attendance: 25,000; Referee: Fabio Maresca

14 October 2017 8	Juventus	1–2	Lazio	Turin
18:00 CEST (UTC+02:00)	Douglas Costa 23'; Buffon (yellow card) 52'; Sturaro (yellow card) 90+3'	Report	Immobile 47', 54' (pen.); Patric (yellow card) 90+7'	Stadium: Allianz Stadium; Attendance: 39,145; Referee: Paolo Mazzoleni

22 October 2017 9	Lazio	3–0	Cagliari	Rome
20:45 CEST (UTC+02:00)	Immobile 7' (pen.), 41'; Lucas (yellow card) 30'; Bastos 49'	Report	Andreolli (yellow card) 29'; Dessena (yellow card) 51'; Farias (yellow card) 72'; Pavoletti (yellow card) 80'	Stadium: Stadio Olimpico; Attendance: 20,000; Referee: Luca Pairetto

25 October 2017 10	Bologna	1–2	Lazio	Bologna
CEST (UTC+02:00)	Masina (yellow card) 19'; Lulić 50' (o.g.); Falletti (yellow card) 85'	Report	Milinković-Savić 4'; Lulić 28'; Bastos (yellow card) 55'; Radu (yellow card) 73'	Stadium: Stadio Renato Dall'Ara; Attendance: 20,070; Referee: Davide Massa

29 October 2017 11	Benevento	1–5	Lazio	Benevento
12:30 CET (UTC+01:00)	Viola (yellow card) 42'; Lazaar 55'	Report	Bastos 4'; Immobile 13'; Marušić 24'; Parolo 76'; Lukaku (yellow card) 85'; Nani 86'	Stadium: Stadio Ciro Vigorito; Attendance: 12,413; Referee: Piero Giacomelli

18 November 2017 13	Roma	2–1	Lazio	Rome
18:00 CET (UTC+01:00)	Perotti 49' (pen.); Nainggolan 53', (yellow card) 67'; Fazio (yellow card) 87'	Report	Lulić (yellow card) 18'; Lucas (yellow card) 25'; Luis Alberto (yellow card) 55'; Nani (yellow card) 63'; Immobile 72' (pen.)	Stadium: Stadio Olimpico; Attendance: 55,775; Referee: Gianluca Rocchi

26 November 2017 14	Lazio	1–1	Fiorentina	Rome
18:00 CET (UTC+01:00)	De Vrij 25'; Radu (yellow card) 87'; Milinković-Savić (yellow card) 90+7'	Report	Astori (yellow card) 11'; Laurini (yellow card) 49'; Babacar 90+4' (pen.)	Stadium: Stadio Olimpico; Attendance: 25,000; Referee: Davide Massa

3 December 2017 15	Sampdoria	1–2	Lazio	Genoa
20:45 CET (UTC+01:00)	Zapata 56'	Report	Milinković-Savić 79'; Caicedo 90+1'; Immobile (yellow card) 90+4'	Stadium: Stadio Luigi Ferraris; Attendance: 18,050; Referee: Paolo Mazzoleni

11 December 2017 16	Lazio	1–3	Torino	Rome
21:00 CET (UTC+01:00)	Immobile (red card) 45+1'; Milinković-Savić (yellow card) 68'; Luis Alberto 69'	Report	Nkoulou (yellow card) 41'; Berenguer 54'; Rincón 64'; Edera 73'	Stadium: Stadio Olimpico; Attendance: 20,000; Referee: Piero Giacomelli

17 December 2017 17	Atalanta	3–3	Lazio	Bergamo
20:45 CET (UTC+01:00)	Caldara 19'; Iličić 22', 50' (pen.); Freuler (yellow card) 63'; Hateboer (yellow card) 83'	Report	Milinković-Savić 27', 35'; Bastos (yellow card) 49'; Luis Alberto 79'; Wallace (yellow card) 80'	Stadium: Stadio Atleti Azzurri d'Italia; Attendance: 16,692; Referee: Massimiliano Irrati

23 December 2017 18	Lazio	4–0	Crotone	Rome
12:30 CET (UTC+01:00)	Milinković-Savić (yellow card) 40'; Lukaku 56'; Immobile 78'; Lulić 86'; Felipe Anderson 89'	Report	Ajeti (yellow card) 68'; Budimir (yellow card) 74'	Stadium: Stadio Olimpico; Attendance: 40,000; Referee: Gianpaolo Calvarese

30 December 2017 19	Internazionale	0–0	Lazio	Milan
18:00 CET (UTC+01:00)	Santon (yellow card) 67'; Vecino (yellow card) 72'	Report	Radu (yellow card) 78'	Stadium: San Siro; Attendance: 61,852; Referee: Gianluca Rocchi

6 January 2018 20	SPAL	2–5	Lazio	Ferrara
15:00 CET (UTC+01:00)	Antenucci 8' (pen.), 30'; Mattiello (yellow card) 40'; Vicari (yellow card) 75'	Report	Luis Alberto 5'; Immobile 19', 26', 41', 50'; Radu (yellow card) 53'; Milinković-Savić (yellow card) 54'; Luiz Felipe (yellow card) 71'	Stadium: Stadio Paolo Mazza; Attendance: 12,057; Referee: Paolo Tagliavento

21 January 2018 21	Lazio	5–1	Chievo	Rome
15:00 CET (UTC+01:00)	Luis Alberto 23'; Milinković-Savić 31', 68'; Lulić (yellow card) 54'; Bastos 83'; Nani 86'	Report	Pucciarelli 25'	Stadium: Stadio Olimpico; Attendance: 25,000; Referee: Rosario Abisso

24 January 2018 12	Lazio	3–0	Udinese	Rome
19:00 CET (UTC+01:00)	Samir 22' (o.g.); Nani 47'; Felipe Anderson 87'	Report	Perica (yellow card) 15'; Samir (yellow card) 45+2'	Stadium: Stadio Olimpico; Attendance: 25,000; Referee: Luca Banti
Note: Postponed due to inclement weather; originally scheduled for 5 November 2017.

28 January 2018 22	Milan	2–1	Lazio	Milan
18:00 CET (UTC+01:00)	Cutrone 15'; Bonaventura 44'; Antonelli (yellow card) 65'; Abate (yellow card) 86'	Report	Marušić 20', (yellow card) 28'; Radu (yellow card) 25'; Milinković-Savić (yellow card) 41'; Lulić (yellow card) 51'; Bastos (yellow card) 85'; Parolo (yellow card) 90'	Stadium: San Siro; Attendance: 50,822; Referee: Massimiliano Irrati

5 February 2018 23	Lazio	1–2	Genoa	Rome
20:45 CET (UTC+01:00)	Parolo 59'	Report	Pandev 55'; Laxalt 90+2'; Rossettini (yellow card) 90+4'	Stadium: Stadio Olimpico; Attendance: 30,000; Referee: Fabio Maresca

10 February 2018 24	Napoli	4–1	Lazio	Naples
20:45 CET (UTC+01:00)	Callejón 43'; Wallace 54' (o.g.); Mário Rui 56'; Mertens 73'	Report	De Vrij 3', (yellow card) 63'; Lucas (yellow card) 43'; Milinković-Savić (yellow card) 45'	Stadium: Stadio San Paolo; Attendance: 32,940; Referee: Luca Banti

19 February 2018 25	Lazio	2–0	Hellas Verona	Rome
20:45 CET (UTC+01:00)	Immobile 55', 60'	Report	Nícolas (yellow card) 51'	Stadium: Stadio Olimpico; Attendance: 25,000; Referee: Gianpaolo Calvarese

25 February 2018 26	Sassuolo	0–3	Lazio	Reggio Emilia
15:00 CET (UTC+01:00)	Berardi (yellow card) 20' (red card) 54'; Missiroli (yellow card) 45+4'; Rogério (yellow card) 63'	Report	Milinković-Savić 7', 46'; Lucas (yellow card) 28'; Immobile 31' (pen.); Wallace (yellow card) 35'; Lukaku (yellow card) 45+1'; Marušić (red card) 62'	Stadium: Mapei Stadium – Città del Tricolore; Attendance: 8,582; Referee: Gianluca Manganiello

3 March 2018 27	Lazio	0–1	Juventus	Rome
18:00 CET (UTC+01:00)	Luis Alberto (yellow card) 27'; Luiz Felipe (yellow card) 30'; Lulić (yellow card) 88'	Report	Lichtsteiner (yellow card) 45+3'; Alex Sandro (yellow card) 75'; Dybala 90+3'	Stadium: Stadio Olimpico; Referee: Luca Banti

11 March 2018 28	Cagliari	2–2	Lazio	Cagliari
15:00 CET (UTC+01:00)	Pavoletti 25'; Ioniță (yellow card) 62'; Barella 74' (pen.); Deiola (yellow card) 86'	Report	Immobile (yellow card) 28', (goal) 90+5'; Ceppitelli 35' (o.g.); Lulić (yellow card) 45+3'; Lucas (yellow card) 54'; Radu (yellow card) 87'	Stadium: Sardegna Arena; Attendance: 14,241; Referee: Marco Guida

18 March 2018 29	Lazio	1–1	Bologna	Rome
18:00 CET (UTC+01:00)	Lucas 16'; Wallace (yellow card) 25'; Bastos (yellow card) 58'	Report	Verdi 3'; De Maio (yellow card) 56'; Mirante (yellow card) 69'	Stadium: Stadio Olimpico; Attendance: 20,000; Referee: Antonio Damato

1 April 2018 30	Lazio	6–2	Benevento	Rome
18:00 CEST (UTC+02:00)	Immobile 19', 68'; Caicedo 60'; De Vrij 66'; Lucas 83'; Luis Alberto 90+1' (pen.)	Report	Puggioni (red card) 9'; Cataldi 23'; Guilherme 51'; Letizia (yellow card) 54'; Brignoli (yellow card) 63'; Sandro (yellow card) 82'; Costa (yellow card) 90+2'	Stadium: Stadio Olimpico; Attendance: 30,000; Referee: Gianpaolo Calvarese

8 April 2018 31	Udinese	1–2	Lazio	Udine
18:00 CEST (UTC+02:00)	Lasagna 13'	Report	Immobile 26'; Luis Alberto 37'; Caicedo (yellow card) 75'; Murgia (yellow card) 90+4'	Stadium: Dacia Arena; Attendance: 21,676; Referee: Gianluca Rocchi

15 April 2018 32	Lazio	0–0	Roma	Rome
20:45 CEST (UTC+02:00)	Lucas (yellow card) 11'; Luiz Felipe (yellow card) 36'; Radu (yellow card) 39' (yellow-red card) 80'	Report	Juan Jesus (yellow card) 31'; Strootman (yellow card) 62'	Stadium: Stadio Olimpico; Attendance: 55,000; Referee: Paolo Mazzoleni

18 April 2018 33	Fiorentina	3–4	Lazio	Florence
20:45 CEST (UTC+02:00)	Sportiello (red card) 7'; Veretout 16', 31' (pen.), 54', (yellow card) 45+3'; Pezzella (yellow card) 75'; Chiesa (yellow card) 82'	Report	Murgia (red card) 14'; Luiz Felipe (yellow card) 27'; Luis Alberto 39', 72', (yellow card) 84'; Cáceres 45'; Felipe Anderson 70'	Stadium: Stadio Artemio Franchi; Attendance: 24,008; Referee: Antonio Damato

22 April 2018 34	Lazio	4–0	Sampdoria	Rome
15:00 CEST (UTC+02:00)	Lucas (yellow card) 24'; Milinković-Savić 32'; De Vrij 43'; Immobile 85', 88'	Report	Praet (yellow card) 25'; Torreira (yellow card) 67'	Stadium: Stadio Olimpico; Attendance: 40,000; Referee: Daniele Orsato

29 April 2018 35	Torino	0–1	Lazio	Turin
20:45 CEST (UTC+02:00)	Moretti (yellow card) 49'; Baselli (yellow card) 54'	Report	Milinković-Savić (yellow card) 43', (goal) 56'; Marušić (yellow card) 76'; Strakosha (yellow card) 82'	Stadium: Stadio Olimpico Grande Torino; Attendance: 17,060; Referee: Massimiliano Irrati

6 May 2018 36	Lazio	1–1	Atalanta	Rome
15:00 CEST (UTC+02:00)	Luiz Felipe (yellow card) 21'; Caicedo 24'; Murgia (yellow card) 68'; Milinković-Savić (yellow card) 74'	Report	Barrow 2'; Masiello (yellow card) 48'; Toloi (yellow card) 90'	Stadium: Stadio Olimpico; Attendance: 45,000; Referee: Luca Banti

13 May 2018 37	Crotone	2–2	Lazio	Crotone
15:00 CEST (UTC+02:00)	Simy 29'; Nalini (yellow card) 36'; Ceccherini 61'	Report	Lulić 17' (pen.); Radu (yellow card) 20'; Murgia (yellow card) 22'; Nani (yellow card) 69'; Milinković-Savić 84'	Stadium: Stadio Ezio Scida; Attendance: 14,983; Referee: Paolo Mazzoleni

20 May 2018 38	Lazio	2–3	Internazionale	Rome
20:45 CEST (UTC+02:00)	Perišić 9' (o.g.); Luiz Felipe (yellow card) 26'; Lulić (yellow card) 34' (yellow-red card) 79'; Lucas (yellow card) 37'; Felipe Anderson 41'; Strakosha (yellow card) 63'; Patric (red card) 90+3'	Report	Brozović (yellow card) 13'; Miranda (yellow card) 23'; D'Ambrosio 29', (yellow card) 47'; Icardi 78' (pen.); Vecino 81', (yellow card) 83'	Stadium: Stadio Olimpico; Attendance: 68,000; Referee: Gianluca Rocchi
Note: Patric was sent off for dissent while a substitute.

=== Coppa Italia ===
14 December 2017 Round of 16	Lazio	4–1	Cittadella	Rome
21:00 CET (UTC+01:00)	Immobile 11', 87'; Felipe Anderson 24'; Camigliano 36' (o.g.)	Report	Bartolomei 41'; Fasolo (yellow card) 51'; Salvi (yellow card) 66'; Pezzi (yellow card) 85'	Stadium: Stadio Olimpico; Attendance: 5,000; Referee: Riccardo Pinzani

26 December 2017 Quarter-finals	Lazio	1–0	Fiorentina	Rome
21:00 CET (UTC+01:00)	Lulić 6'; Strakosha (yellow card) 79'	Report	Gaspar (yellow card) 35'; Veretout (yellow card) 83'	Stadium: Stadio Olimpico; Attendance: 25,000; Referee: Antonio Damato

31 January 2018 Semi-finals; First leg	Milan	0–0	Lazio	Milan
20:45 CET (UTC+01:00)	Borini (yellow card) 21'	Report	Radu (yellow card) 27'	Stadium: San Siro; Attendance: 17,724; Referee: Marco Guida

28 February 2018 Semi-finals; Second leg	Lazio	0–0 (a.e.t.) (0–0 agg.) (4–5 p)	Milan	Rome
20:45 CET (UTC+01:00)	Marušić (yellow card) 90+2'; Radu (yellow card) 103'; Milinković-Savić (yellow card) 103'	Report	Kessié (yellow card) 38'; Romagnoli (yellow card) 57'; Calabria (yellow card) 73'	Stadium: Stadio Olimpico; Attendance: 40,000; Referee: Gianluca Rocchi
	Penalties
	Immobile (penalty scored); Milinković-Savić (penalty missed); Lucas (penalty missed); Felipe Anderson (penalty scored); Lulić (penalty scored); Luiz Felipe (penalty missed)		(penalty missed) Rodríguez; (penalty missed) Montolivo; (penalty scored) Bonaventura; (penalty scored) Borini; (penalty scored) Bonucci; (penalty scored) Çalhanoğlu; (penalty scored) Romagnoli

=== UEFA Europa League ===
==== Group stage ====
Pos	Team	Pld	W	D	L	GF	GA	GD	Pts	Qualification	LAZ	NCE	ZUL	VIT
1	(Italy) Lazio	6	4	1	1	12	7	+5	13	Advance to knockout phase	—	1–0	2–0	1–1
2	(France) Nice	6	3	0	3	12	7	+5	9	Advance to knockout phase	1–3	—	3–1	3–0
3	(Belgium) Zulte Waregem	6	2	1	3	8	13	−5	7		3–2	1–5	—	1–1
4	(Netherlands) Vitesse	6	1	2	3	5	10	−5	5		2–3	1–0	0–2	—

Source: UEFA
Rules for classification: Group stage tiebreakers

14 September 2017 1	Vitesse (Netherlands)	2–3	(Italy) Lazio	Arnhem, Netherlands
21:05 CEST (UTC+02:00)	Matavž 33'; Linssen 57'	Report	Luiz Felipe (yellow card) 32'; Parolo 51'; Immobile 67'; De Vrij (yellow card) 70'; Murgia 75'; Lulić (yellow card) 83'	Stadium: GelreDome; Attendance: 19,867; Referee: Liran Liany (Israel)

28 September 2017 2	Lazio (Italy)	2–0	(Belgium) Zulte Waregem	Rome, Italy
19:00 CEST (UTC+02:00)	Caicedo 18'; Immobile 90'	Report	Baudry (yellow card) 50'; Leya Iseka (yellow card) 84'	Stadium: Stadio Olimpico; Attendance: 300; Referee: Harald Lechner (Austria)

19 October 2017 3	Nice (France)	1–3	(Italy) Lazio	Nice, France
19:00 CEST (UTC+02:00)	Balotelli 4'; Mendy (yellow card) 78'	Report	Caicedo 5'; Milinković-Savić 65', 89'; Luiz Felipe (yellow card) 86'	Stadium: Allianz Riviera; Attendance: 21,386; Referee: Craig Thomson (Scotland)

2 November 2017 4	Lazio (Italy)	1–0	(France) Nice	Rome, Italy
21:05 CET (UTC+01:00)	Lucas (yellow card) 75'; Le Marchand 90+2' (o.g.)	Report		Stadium: Stadio Olimpico; Attendance: 21,327; Referee: Jesús Gil Manzano (Spain)

23 November 2017 5	Lazio (Italy)	1–1	(Netherlands) Vitesse	Rome, Italy
19:00 CET (UTC+01:00)	Luis Alberto 42'	Report	Linssen 13'	Stadium: Stadio Olimpico; Attendance: 8,226; Referee: Ali Palabıyık (Turkey)

7 December 2017 6	Zulte Waregem (Belgium)	3–2	(Italy) Lazio	Waregem, Belgium
21:05 CET (UTC+01:00)	De Pauw 6'; Heylen 60'; Walsh (yellow card) 75'; Leya Iseka 83'	Report	Caicedo 67'; Lucas 76'	Stadium: Regenboogstadion; Attendance: 8,845; Referee: Charalambos Kalogeropoulos (Greece)

==== Knockout phase ====
===== Round of 32 =====
15 February 2018 First leg	FCSB (Romania)	1–0	(Italy) Lazio	Bucharest, Romania
21:05 CET (UTC+01:00)	Pintilii (yellow card) 26'; Gnohéré 29'; Vlad (yellow card) 64'; Găman (yellow card) 78'	Report	Milinković-Savić (yellow card) 9'; Cáceres (yellow card) 45+1'; Lukaku (yellow card) 45+4'; Luiz Felipe (yellow card) 52'; Immobile (yellow card) 90+1'	Stadium: Arena Națională; Attendance: 33,455; Referee: Deniz Aytekin (Germany)

22 February 2018 Second leg	Lazio (Italy)	5–1 (5–2 agg.)	(Romania) FCSB	Rome, Italy
19:00 CET (UTC+01:00)	Immobile 7', 42', 71', (yellow card) 33'; Basta (yellow card) 30'; Bastos 35'; Felipe Anderson 51'	Report	Gnohéré 82'	Stadium: Stadio Olimpico; Attendance: 27,597; Referee: Slavko Vinčić (Slovenia)

===== Round of 16 =====
8 March 2018 First leg	Lazio (Italy)	2–2	(Ukraine) Dynamo Kyiv	Rome, Italy
21:05 CET (UTC+01:00)	Immobile 54'; Felipe Anderson 62'; Murgia (yellow card) 63'; Milinković-Savić (yellow card) 71'; Lukaku (yellow card) 81'	Report	Pivarić (yellow card) 36'; Tsyhankov 52'; Kádár (yellow card) 69'; Harmash (yellow card) 70' (yellow-red card) 90+6'; Júnior Moraes 79'; Boyko (yellow card) 90+1'	Stadium: Stadio Olimpico; Attendance: 21,562; Referee: Ivan Kružliak (Slovakia)

15 March 2018 Second leg	Dynamo Kyiv (Ukraine)	0–2 (2–4 agg.)	(Italy) Lazio	Kyiv, Ukraine
19:00 CET (UTC+01:00)	Júnior Moraes (yellow card) 55'; Shabanov (yellow card) 66'; Buyalskyi (yellow card) 90+3'	Report	Luiz Felipe (yellow card) 18'; Lucas 23'; De Vrij 83'	Stadium: NSC Olimpiyskiy Stadium; Attendance: 52,639; Referee: Jesús Gil Manzano (Spain)

===== Quarter-finals =====
5 April 2018 First leg	Lazio (Italy)	4–2	(Austria) Red Bull Salzburg	Rome, Italy
21:05 CEST (UTC+02:00)	Lulić 8', (yellow card) 30'; Basta (yellow card) 28'; Parolo (yellow card) 45+3', (goal) 49'; Felipe Anderson 74'; Immobile 76'	Report	V. Berisha 30' (pen.); Minamino 71'; Samassékou (yellow card) 84'	Stadium: Stadio Olimpico; Attendance: 42,538; Referee: Ovidiu Hațegan (Romania)

12 April 2018 Second leg	Red Bull Salzburg (Austria)	4–1 (6–5 agg.)	(Italy) Lazio	Wals-Siezenheim, Austria
21:05 CEST (UTC+02:00)	Dabbur 56'; Ulmer (yellow card) 60'; Haidara 72'; Hwang Hee-chan 74'; Lainer 76'; Ramalho (yellow card) 90+2'; Walke (yellow card) 90+2'	Report	Immobile 55'; Lucas (yellow card) 64'; Luiz Felipe (yellow card) 65'; Milinković-Savić (yellow card) 89'	Stadium: Red Bull Arena; Attendance: 29,520; Referee: Damir Skomina (Slovenia)

== Statistics ==
=== Appearances and goals ===
No.	Pos	Nat	Player	Total		Serie A		Supercoppa Italiana		Coppa Italia		Europa League	
No.	Pos	Nat	Player	Apps	Goals	Apps	Goals	Apps	Goals	Apps	Goals	Apps	Goals
Goalkeepers
1	GK	(Albania) ALB	Thomas Strakosha	53	0	38	0	1	0	4	0	10	0
—	GK	(Italy) ITA	Federico Marchetti	0	0	0	0	0	0	0	0	0	0
55	GK	(Croatia) CRO	Ivan Vargić	2	0	0	0	0	0	0	0	2	0
Defenders
3	DF	(Netherlands) NED	Stefan de Vrij	47	7	36	6	1	0	3	0	7	1
4	DF	(Spain) ESP	Patric	20	0	4+6	0	0	0	1	0	7+2	0
5	DF	(Belgium) BEL	Jordan Lukaku	44	1	10+20	1	0+1	0	2+3	0	7+1	0
8	DF	(Serbia) SRB	Dušan Basta	22	0	9+2	0	1	0	3	0	7	0
13	DF	(Brazil) BRA	Wallace	17	0	12+1	0	1	0	1	0	1+1	0
15	DF	(Angola) ANG	Bastos	28	5	16+5	4	0	0	1	0	5+1	1
22	DF	(Uruguay) URU	Martín Cáceres	10	1	4+2	1	0	0	2	0	2	0
26	DF	(Romania) ROU	Ștefan Radu	42	0	31	0	1	0	4	0	6	0
27	DF	(Brazil) BRA	Luiz Felipe	31	0	12+6	0	0	0	1+2	0	10	0
77	DF	(Montenegro) MNE	Adam Marušić	38	3	27+4	3	0+1	0	1	0	3+2	0
Midfielders
6	MF	(Brazil) BRA	Lucas Leiva	50	4	35+1	2	1	0	4	0	7+2	2
10	MF	(Brazil) BRA	Felipe Anderson	31	8	9+11	4	0	0	3+1	1	3+4	3
11	MF	(Italy) ITA	Luca Crecco	2	0	0	0	0	0	0	0	2	0
16	MF	(Italy) ITA	Marco Parolo	43	6	30+1	4	1	0	3	0	6+2	2
18	MF	(Spain) ESP	Luis Alberto	42	12	26+2	11	1	0	2+2	0	8+1	1
19	MF	(Bosnia and Herzegovina) BIH	Senad Lulić	51	5	31+5	3	1	0	2+2	1	5+5	1
21	MF	(Serbia) SRB	Sergej Milinković-Savić	47	14	32+2	12	1	0	4	0	5+3	2
32	MF	(Italy) ITA	Alessio Miceli	2	0	0	0	0	0	0	0	1+1	0
88	MF	(Italy) ITA	Davide Di Gennaro	5	0	0+2	0	0	0	0	0	3	0
96	MF	(Italy) ITA	Alessandro Murgia	27	2	9+7	0	0+1	1	1	0	8+1	1
Forwards
7	FW	(Portugal) POR	Nani	24	3	2+15	3	0	0	0+1	0	4+2	0
9	FW	(Serbia) SRB	Filip Đorđević	0	0	0	0	0	0	0	0	0	0
17	FW	(Italy) ITA	Ciro Immobile	47	41	33	29	1	2	3+1	2	5+4	8
20	FW	(Ecuador) ECU	Felipe Caicedo	33	6	4+18	3	0	0	1+1	0	6+3	3
71	FW	(Senegal) SEN	Mamadou Tounkara	0	0	0	0	0	0	0	0	0	0
Players transferred out during the season
70	MF	(Australia) AUS	Chris Ikonomidis	0	0	0	0	0	0	0	0	0	0
29	FW	(Italy) ITA	Simone Palombi	2	0	1	0	0	0	0	0	1	0
33	DF	(Brazil) BRA	Maurício	1	0	0+1	0	0	0	0	0	0	0

Last updated: 20 May 2018
Source: Competitions

=== Goalscorers ===
Rank	No.	Pos	Nat	Name	Serie A	Supercoppa	Coppa Italia	UEFA EL	Total
1	17	FW	(Italy)	Ciro Immobile	29	2	2	8	41
2	21	MF	(Serbia)	Sergej Milinković-Savić	12	0	0	2	14
3	18	MF	(Spain)	Luis Alberto	11	0	0	1	12
4	10	MF	(Brazil)	Felipe Anderson	4	0	1	3	8
5	3	DF	(Netherlands)	Stefan de Vrij	6	0	0	1	7
6	16	MF	(Italy)	Marco Parolo	4	0	0	2	6
6	20	FW	(Ecuador)	Felipe Caicedo	3	0	0	3	6
8	15	DF	(Angola)	Bastos	4	0	0	1	5
8	19	MF	(Bosnia and Herzegovina)	Senad Lulić	3	0	1	1	5
10	6	MF	(Brazil)	Lucas Leiva	2	0	0	2	4
11	7	FW	(Portugal)	Nani	3	0	0	0	3
11	77	FW	(Montenegro)	Adam Marušić	3	0	0	0	3
13	96	MF	(Italy)	Alessandro Murgia	0	1	0	1	2
14	5	DF	(Belgium)	Jordan Lukaku	1	0	0	0	1
14	22	DF	(Uruguay)	Martín Cáceres	1	0	0	0	1
Own goal					3	0	1	1	5
Totals					89	3	5	25	122

Last updated: 20 May 2018

=== Clean sheets ===
Rank	No.	Pos	Nat	Name	Serie A	Supercoppa	Coppa Italia	UEFA EL	Total
1	1	GK	(Albania)	Thomas Strakosha	11	0	3	3	17
Totals					11	0	3	3	17

Last updated: 20 May 2018

=== Disciplinary record ===
No.	Pos	Nat	Name	Serie A			Supercoppa			Coppa Italia			UEFA EL			Total		
No.	Pos	Nat	Name	Yellow card	(yellow card) (yellow-red card)	Red card	Yellow card	(yellow card) (yellow-red card)	Red card	Yellow card	(yellow card) (yellow-red card)	Red card	Yellow card	(yellow card) (yellow-red card)	Red card	Yellow card	(yellow card) (yellow-red card)	Red card
1	GK	(Albania)	Thomas Strakosha	3	0	0	0	0	0	1	0	0	0	0	0	4	0	0
3	DF	(Netherlands)	Stefan de Vrij	3	0	0	0	0	0	0	0	0	1	0	0	4	0	0
4	DF	(Spain)	Patric	1	0	1	0	0	0	0	0	0	0	0	0	1	0	1
5	DF	(Belgium)	Jordan Lukaku	2	0	0	0	0	0	0	0	0	2	0	0	4	0	0
8	DF	(Serbia)	Dušan Basta	0	0	0	0	0	0	0	0	0	2	0	0	2	0	0
13	DF	(Brazil)	Wallace	5	0	0	0	0	0	0	0	0	0	0	0	5	0	0
15	DF	(Angola)	Bastos	4	0	0	0	0	0	0	0	0	0	0	0	4	0	0
22	DF	(Uruguay)	Martín Cáceres	0	0	0	0	0	0	0	0	0	1	0	0	1	0	0
26	DF	(Romania)	Ștefan Radu	8	1	0	0	0	0	2	0	0	0	0	0	10	1	0
27	DF	(Brazil)	Luiz Felipe	6	0	0	0	0	0	0	0	0	6	0	0	11	0	0
6	MF	(Brazil)	Lucas Leiva	9	0	0	1	0	0	0	0	0	2	0	0	12	0	0
16	MF	(Italy)	Marco Parolo	2	1	0	1	0	0	0	0	0	1	0	0	4	1	0
18	MF	(Spain)	Luis Alberto	4	0	0	0	0	0	0	0	0	0	0	0	4	0	0
19	MF	(Bosnia and Herzegovina)	Senad Lulić	6	1	0	1	0	0	0	0	0	2	0	0	9	1	0
21	MF	(Serbia)	Sergej Milinković-Savić	8	0	0	0	0	0	1	0	0	3	0	0	12	0	0
96	MF	(Italy)	Alessandro Murgia	3	0	1	0	0	0	0	0	0	1	0	1	4	0	1
7	FW	(Portugal)	Nani	2	0	0	0	0	0	0	0	0	0	0	0	2	0	0
17	FW	(Italy)	Ciro Immobile	3	0	1	1	0	0	0	0	0	2	0	0	6	0	1
20	FW	(Ecuador)	Felipe Caicedo	1	0	0	0	0	0	0	0	0	0	0	0	1	0	0
77	FW	(Montenegro)	Adam Marušić	3	0	1	0	0	0	1	0	0	0	0	0	4	0	1
Totals				74	3	4	4	0	0	5	0	0	22	0	0	105	3	4

Last updated: 20 May 2018
