= Felipe Anderson =

Brazilian footballer (born 1993)

- Felipe Anderson with Palmeiras in 2026

Personal information
- Full name: Felipe Anderson Pereira Gomes
- Date of birth: 15 April 1993 (age 33)
- Place of birth: Santa Maria, Federal District, Brazil
- Height: 1.75 m (5 ft 9 in)
- Positions: Winger; attacking midfielder

Team information
- Current team: Palmeiras
- Number: 7

Youth career
- 2000: 14º CPMIND
- 2000–2006: Federal
- 2006: SCR Gaminha
- 2006–2007: Astral EC
- 2007: Coritiba
- 2007–2010: Santos

Senior career*
Years	Team	Apps	(Gls)
2010–2013	Santos	98	(9)
2013–2018	Lazio	137	(25)
2018–2021	West Ham United	63	(10)
2020–2021	→ Porto (loan)	5	(0)
2021–2024	Lazio	114	(20)
2024–	Palmeiras	75	(7)

International career
2010	Brazil U17		
2011–2013	Brazil U20	4	(0)
2014	Brazil U23	2	(1)
2015–2019	Brazil	2	(0)
Medal record
Olympic Games
Gold medal – first place	2016 Rio de Janeiro	Team
- * Club domestic league appearances and goals as of 03:14, 1 June 2026 (UTC)

Felipe Anderson Pereira Gomes (born 15 April 1993), known simply as Felipe Anderson, is a Brazilian professional footballer who plays as a winger or attacking midfielder for Brasileiro Série A club Palmeiras. He previously played for Santos, West Ham United, Porto, and Lazio. He was capped by the Brazil national team twice.

== Early and personal life ==
Born Santa Maria, Distrito Federal, Brazil, Felipe Anderson grew up the youngest of five siblings. His upbringing was poor, with his parents occasionally struggling to buy food for the family due to their debts. As a child, he had to borrow football boots from his friends to play.

During his childhood, Anderson would play football on the streets until he was 11 years old, as children in Brazil could not join professional footballing academies until they were 13. Anderson credits the street football games for his technical skill on the ball.

== Club career ==
=== Early career ===
Felipe Anderson began his career in Associação 14 Companhia de Polícia Militar Independente (CPMIND), in his hometown of Santa Maria at 6 years old. In 2006, he was moved to Federal FC, and later to Sport Clube Recreativo Gaminha FC. After some impressive performances on the club, he was moved to Paraná to play for Astral EC, finishing the year. In 2007, he was moved to Coritiba youth side, and then in 2007 summer he was moved to Santos.

=== Santos ===
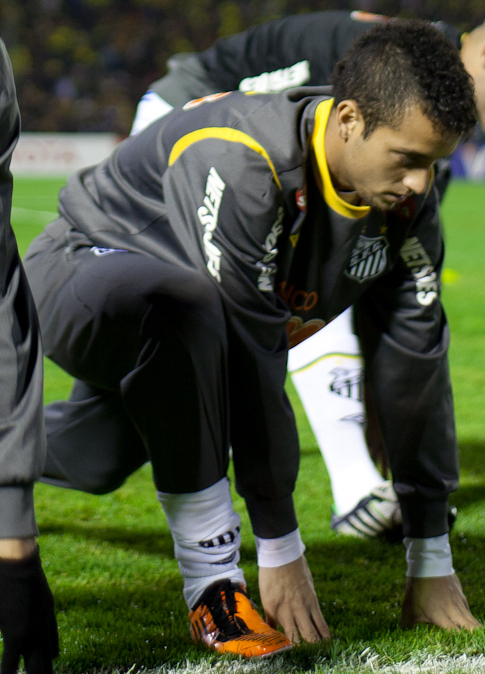
Felipe Anderson warming up with Santos before the first leg of the 2011 Copa Libertadores finals

Felipe Anderson then played for Santos' youth categories, and was promoted to the senior squad following a rash of injuries in October 2010. He began training with the senior side and signed a professional contract until July 2013. He made his debut for Santos on 6 October 2010 as a 90th-minute substitute in a 3–0 win against Fluminense.

His first goal of his footballing career came on 11 February 2011, when Felipe came off the bench at half time to replace Keirrison against Noroeste, scoring from a long range shot in the 70th minute. On 7 September, he scored his first league goal, against Avaí. In November, he signed a new contract with Santos, running until 2016.

In his following season, Felipe Anderson had more chances in first team alongside Neymar, due to Ganso's injuries and Elano's poor form (both players left Santos in the middle of the season). On 9 February 2012, he scored his first goal of the season, against Botafogo-SP.

On the 31 January 2013, the agreed transfer to the Italian club Lazio for €7.5 million failed due to late arrival of a necessary international fax from Brazil to close the deal.

=== Lazio ===
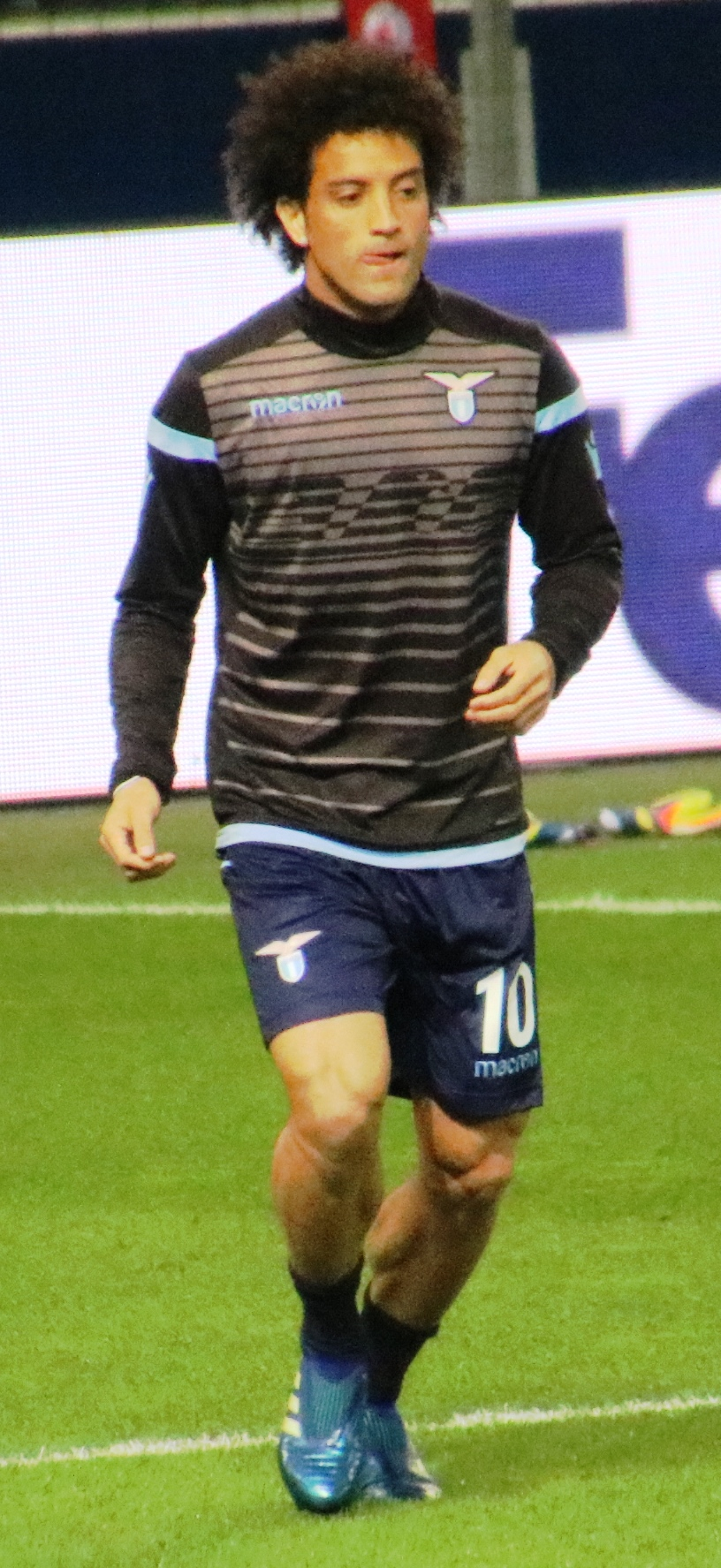
Felipe Anderson playing for Lazio in 2018

On 25 June 2013, Lazio agreed a €7.8 million fee with Santos, and Felipe Anderson signed a five-year deal worth €800,000 a year. Santos received 50% of the transfer sum and third party owner Doyen Sports would get the rest. Lazio's sporting director Igli Tare criticised Doyen Sports for numerous times delaying the transfer, "It will remain in history as the most paradoxical and shocking negotiations I have ever been a part of", said Tare. "These third party owners changed their minds continually. When we had everything decided, they would start from scratch two hours later. It all happened for a full week, so it felt like being in the Twilight Zone."

==== 2014–15 season ====
In his second season at the club, Felipe Anderson achieved 10 goals and nine assists in 27 games across all competitions by April 2015. This included the concluding goal as Lazio defeated Varese 3–0 in the fourth round of the season's Coppa Italia, and an assist in both legs of the tournament's semi-final against holders Napoli, the one in the second leg providing the winning goal by Senad Lulić. In March 2015, Felipe Anderson signed a contract extension at Lazio, renewing his contract until June 2020. He played the full 120 minutes of the Coppa Italia final on 20 May 2015, a 1–2 loss to Juventus.

==== 2015–16 season ====
In July, it was announced that Felipe Anderson would not be wearing the number 7 shirt that he had worn in his previous season with Lazio, but that he would instead be awarded the number 10 shirt. On 8 August, Felipe Anderson appeared in Lazio's 2–0 defeat to Juventus in the 2015 Supercoppa Italiana. On 23 September 2015, Felipe Anderson scored his first goal of the season in a 2–0 victory against Genoa. After scoring the second goal in a 3–1 Europa League win against Rosenborg on 22 October 2015, Felipe Anderson scored twice in a 3–0 win against Torino three days later. In February 2016, Lazio publicly denied rumours that Manchester United had agreed a transfer for Felipe Anderson. Felipe Anderson finished Lazio's season with nine goals in all competitions, coming runner-up to Antonio Candreva in Lazio's scoring charts for the season.

==== 2016–17 season ====
After being the subject of reported interest from Chelsea during the summer, Felipe Anderson remained with Lazio. On 26 October 2016, Felipe Anderson scored his first goal of the season, in a 4–1 win against Cagliari. On 7 May 2017, Felipe Anderson scored a penalty in a 7–3 win against Sampdoria. Lazio secured qualification for the Europa League at the end of the season, with Felipe Anderson scoring five goals in all competitions.

==== 2017–18 season ====
During the 2017–18 season Felipe Anderson's form suffered numerous setbacks. A falling out with manager Simone Inzaghi after a 2–1 defeat to Genoa in February 2018 coupled with a knee injury that kept him out from August to December 2017 restricted Felipe Anderson to just nine Serie A starts for the season. On 20 May 2018, Felipe Anderson scored in his final game for Lazio in a 3–2 defeat to Inter Milan in a game that saw the victors qualify for the Champions League over Lazio.

=== West Ham United ===
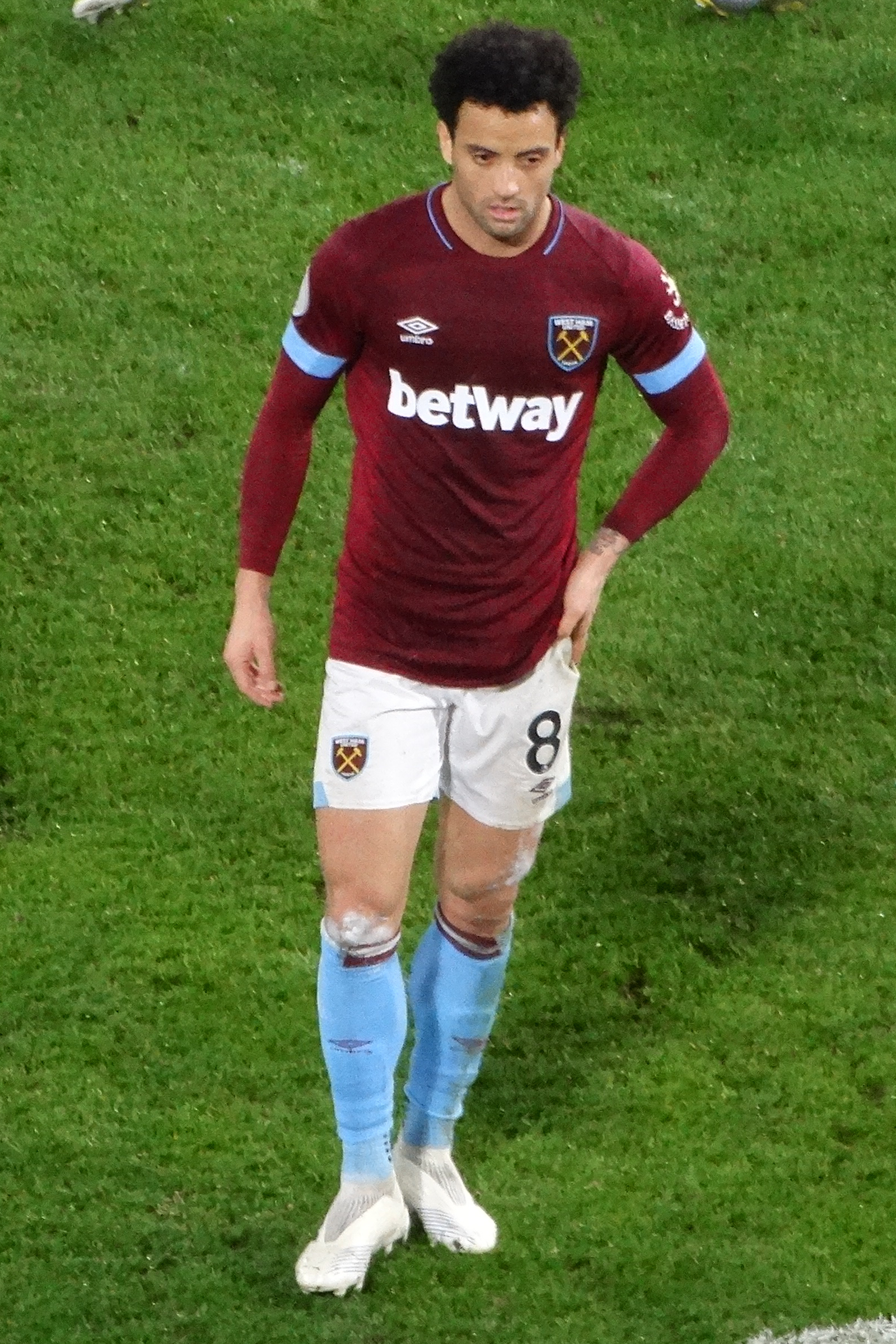
Felipe Anderson playing for West Ham in 2019

On 15 July 2018, Felipe Anderson signed for West Ham United for a reported transfer fee of £36 million. The fee surpassed the previous record paid by the club, set with the £22 million signing of Issa Diop earlier in the same transfer window.

==== 2018–19 season ====
Felipe Anderson made his first appearance for West Ham in a 3–1 pre-season friendly victory against Aston Villa on 25 July 2018, in which he combined with Arthur Masuaku to set up West Ham's second goal of the match, scored by Marko Arnautović. He made his full debut on 12 August 2018 in a 4–0 defeat against Liverpool. On 29 September 2018, Felipe Anderson scored his first Premier League goal for West Ham with a back heeled finish in a 3–1 home win against Manchester United. Anderson scored nine league goals in his first season of English football, helping West Ham finish 10th in the Premier League.

==== 2019–20 season ====
The 2019–20 season was a difficult one for Anderson as he found the back of the net just once in a 4–0 win over AFC Bournemouth on 1 January 2020. The departure of manager Manuel Pellegrini saw reduced minutes for the Brazilian as he battled inconsistent form. The goal against Bournemouth signalled changing fortunes, however, a troublesome back injury saw Anderson fall out of new manager David Moyes' plans. Following the interruption of the 2019–20 Premier League season due to the COVID-19 pandemic, Anderson only made three appearances out of a total of nine games following the restart to the season.

==== Loan to Porto ====
On 6 October 2020, Felipe Anderson joined Portuguese club Porto on a season-long loan. It was a widely anticipated move for the out-of-form Brazilian to gain much needed confidence and playing time. On arrival at the club, Anderson said he was "fulfilling a dream" to play in both the UEFA Champions League and Primeira Liga whilst also insisting that he will still attempt to regain a starting spot at West Ham the following season. He made his Porto debut on 17 October, replacing Luis Díaz in the 59th minute of a 2–2 draw at Sporting CP.

Throughout the season, Anderson only made five Primeira Liga appearances - largely put down to a sour relationship with manager Sérgio Conceição. In October, he suggested Anderson "needs to work hard" and there were many indications Anderson was signed against the manager's wishes. At the end of the season, Anderson seemed to criticise the manager stating that he applied himself from the beginning but "wasn't given many opportunities to play."

=== Return to Lazio ===
On 16 July 2021, Anderson returned to Lazio on a permanent transfer for an undisclosed fee. He had played 73 games for West Ham scoring 12 goals. On 15 April 2024, he announced through his official Instagram account that he was not going to renew his contract with Lazio.

=== Palmeiras ===
Felipe Anderson playing for Palmeiras in 2026

Shortly after his decision to leave Lazio was disclosed, it was revealed that Anderson would return to his home country and join Palmeiras after his contract with Lazio had expired. On 17 July 2024, he made his debut for the club, coming on as a 70th-minute substitute in a 1–0 away defeat to Botafogo in the Campeonato Brasileiro Série A.

== International career ==
Felipe Anderson was one of seven stand-by players named by coach Dunga for Brazil's squad at the 2015 Copa América in Chile. He made his debut in a warm-up match against Mexico on 7 June of that year, playing the final seven minutes in place of Fred in a 2–0 victory at Allianz Parque in São Paulo.

In June 2016, Felipe Anderson was included in Brazil's squad for the 2016 Summer Olympics on home soil by the Olympic side's manager Rogério Micale. On 20 August, he appeared in the final of the tournament against Germany at the Maracanã in Rio; Brazil won the match 5–4 on penalties following a 1–1 draw to capture its first Olympic gold medal in men's football. Anderson was recalled to the Brazil squad in February 2019, for the first time since 2015, for two friendly matches.

== Style of play ==
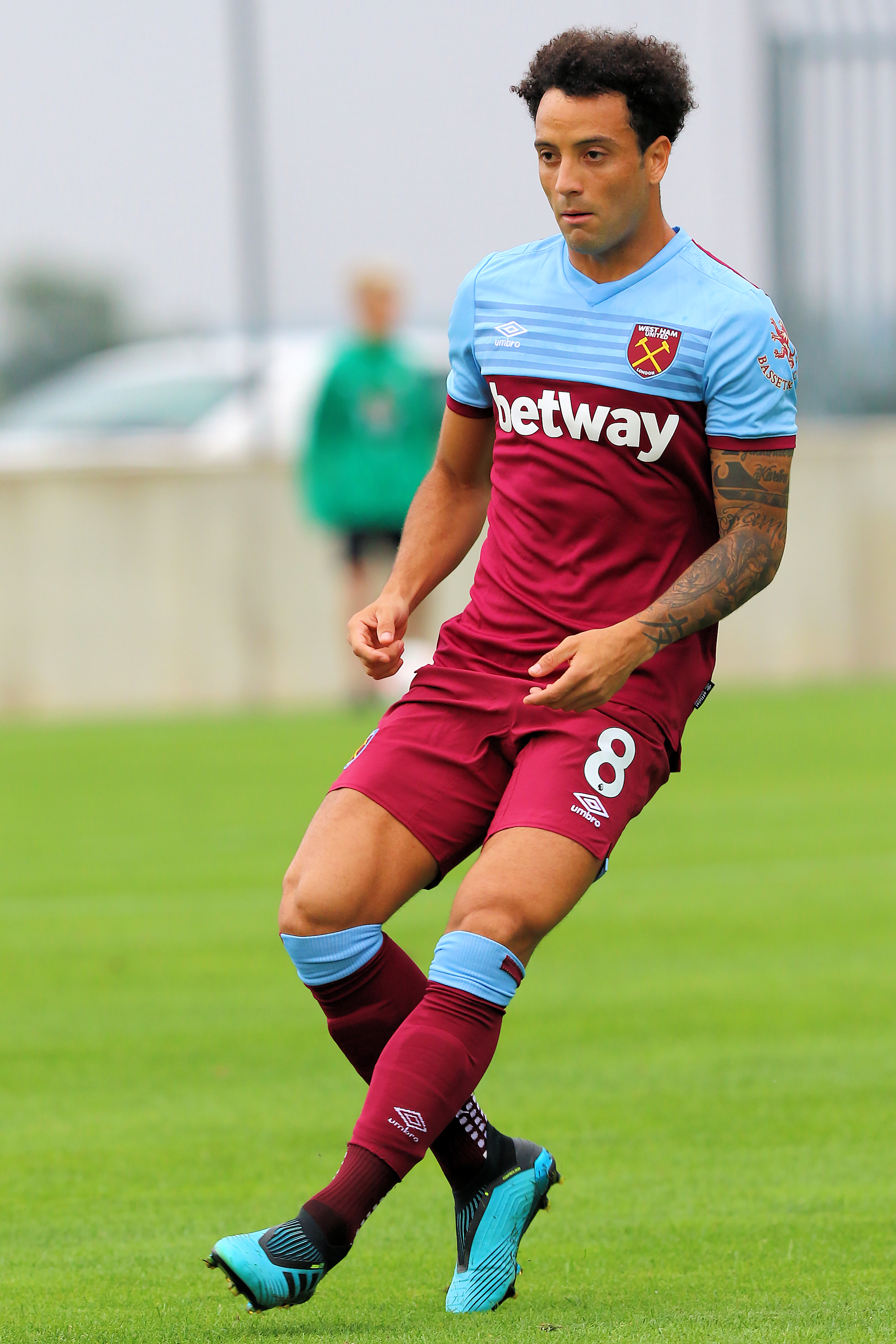
Felipe Anderson playing for West Ham in 2019

Considered a technically gifted midfielder, with a slender physique, Felipe Anderson is predominantly known for his pace; although not imposing physically or in the air, he also possesses good ball control, quick feet, and good dribbling skills, which allow him to beat opponents in one on one situations. A tactically versatile player, he is capable of playing in several different positions due to his ability to both create and score goals: he has been used as a forward or as a central midfield playmaker, but has most frequently been deployed as either a winger or an attacking midfielder, due to his offensive movement and tendency to operate between the lines; he is capable of playing on either flank or through the centre of the pitch, due to his ability to cut into the middle and strike on goal, or move out to the wing to provide crosses to teammates in the area. In addition to his speed, stamina, creativity and technical ability, he is known for his eye for goal, and his long-distance shots with either feet, despite being naturally right-footed.

== Career statistics ==
=== Club ===
As of match played 31 May 2026

Appearances and goals by club, season and competition
Club	Season	League			National cup (Note: Includes Copa do Brasil, Coppa Italia, FA Cup and Taça de Portugal)		League cup (Note: Includes EFL Cup and Taça da Liga)		Continental (Note: Includes Copa Libertadores, UEFA Champions League, UEFA Europa League and UEFA Europa Conference League)		Other (Note: Includes Campeonato Paulista, Supercoppa Italiana and FIFA Club World Cup)		Total	
Club	Season	Division	Apps	Goals	Apps	Goals	Apps	Goals	Apps	Goals	Apps	Goals	Apps	Goals
Santos	2010	Série A	5	0	0	0	—		0	0	0	0	5	0
Santos	2011	Série A	18	1	0	0	—		1	0	10	1	29	2
Santos	2012	Série A	35	6	0	0	—		4	0	12	1	51	7
Santos	2013	Série A	3	0	3	0	—		0	0	15	0	21	0
Santos	Total		61	7	3	0	—		5	0	37	2	106	9
Lazio	2013–14	Serie A	13	0	2	0	—		5	1	—		20	1
Lazio	2014–15	Serie A	32	10	5	1	—		—		—		37	11
Lazio	2015–16	Serie A	35	7	2	0	—		9	2	1	0	47	9
Lazio	2016–17	Serie A	36	4	5	1	—		—		—		41	5
Lazio	2017–18	Serie A	21	4	4	1	—		7	3	0	0	32	8
Lazio	Total		137	25	18	3	—		21	6	1	0	177	34
West Ham United	2018–19	Premier League	36	9	2	1	2	0	—		—		40	10
West Ham United	2019–20	Premier League	25	1	1	0	2	0	—		—		28	1
West Ham United	2020–21	Premier League	2	0	—		3	1	—		—		5	1
West Ham United	Total		63	10	3	1	7	1	—		—		73	12
Porto (loan)	2020–21	Primeira Liga	5	0	2	0	2	0	1	0	—		10	0
Lazio	2021–22	Serie A	38	6	2	0	—		8	1	—		48	7
Lazio	2022–23	Serie A	38	9	2	1	—		10	2	—		50	12
Lazio	2023–24	Serie A	38	5	4	0	—		8	0	1	0	51	5
Lazio	Total		114	20	8	1	—		26	3	1	0	149	24
Palmeiras	2024	Série A	20	2	2	0	—		2	0	—		24	2
Palmeiras	2025	Série A	31	4	3	0	—		11	0	6	0	51	4
Palmeiras	2026	Série A	13	1	2	1	—		5	0	6	0	26	2
Palmeiras	Total		64	7	7	1	—		18	0	12	0	101	8
Career total			444	69	41	6	9	1	71	9	51	2	616	87

=== International ===
As of match played 23 March 2019

Appearances and goals by national team and year
National team	Year	Apps	Goals
Brazil	2015	1	0
Brazil	2019	1	0
Total		2	0

== Honours ==
Santos

- Campeonato Paulista: 2011, 2012
- Copa Libertadores: 2011
- Recopa Sudamericana: 2012

Lazio

- Supercoppa Italiana: 2017
- Coppa Italia runner-up: 2014–15, 2016–17

Palmeiras

- Campeonato Paulista: 2026
- Copa Libertadores runner-up: 2025

Brazil U23

- Olympic Gold Medal: 2016
