= Alessio Miceli =

Italian footballer (born 1999)

Personal information
- Date of birth: 30 August 1999 (age 27)
- Place of birth: Rome, Italy
- Height: 1.79 m (5 ft 10 in)
- Position: Midfielder

Team information
- Current team: FC Rànger's
- Number: 23

Youth career
- 2007–2017: Lazio

Senior career*
Years	Team	Apps	(Gls)
2017–2018	Lazio	0	(0)
2018–2020	Feralpisalò	0	(0)
2019–2020	→ Olbia (loan)	4	(0)
2020–2021	Piacenza	12	(1)
2021–2023	Dordrecht	49	(3)
2024	Logroñés	14	(0)
2024	Paradiso	12	(0)
2025–	FC Rànger's	3	(0)
- * Club domestic league appearances and goals as of 10 June 2025

Alessio Miceli (born 30 August 1999) is an Italian professional footballer who plays as a midfielder for Andorran Primera Divisió club FC Rànger's.

== Professional career ==
Miceli is a product of the S.S. Lazio Youth Sector, and played in several different positions at youth level, from attacking midfielder to centre-back. 10 years after first joining their academy, Miceli made his professional debut for Lazio in a 2017–18 UEFA Europa League group stage 1–1 tie with SBV Vitesse on 23 November 2017.

On 2 September 2019, he joined Olbia on loan with an option to purchase.

On 3 September 2020 he signed with Piacenza.

On 9 July 2021, he moved to Dutch club Dordrecht. He made his debut for the club on 6 August in a 1–1 draw in the Eerste Divisie against Jong PSV.

== Career statistics ==
=== Club ===
As of 6 August 2023

Appearances and goals by club, season and competition
Club	Season	League			Cup		Other		Total	
Club	Season	Division	Apps	Goals	Apps	Goals	Apps	Goals	Apps	Goals
Lazio	2017-18	Serie A	0	0	0	0	2 (Note: Appearances in UEFA Europa League)	0	2	0
Feralpisalò	2018-19	Serie C	0	0	1	0	0	0	1	0
Feralpisalò	2019-20	Serie C	0	0	0	0	0	0	0	0
Olbia (loan)	2019-20	Serie C	5	0	0	0	0	0	5	0
Piacenza	2020-21	Serie C	12	1	0	0	0	0	12	1
Total			17	1	1	0	2	0	20	1
FC Dordrecht	2021-22	Eerste Divisie	30	3	1	0	0	0	31	3
FC Dordrecht	2022-23	Eerste Divisie	19	0	1	0	0	0	20	0
Total			49	3	2	0	0	0	51	3
Career total			66	4	3	0	2	0	71	4
