= 2017 Supercoppa Italiana =

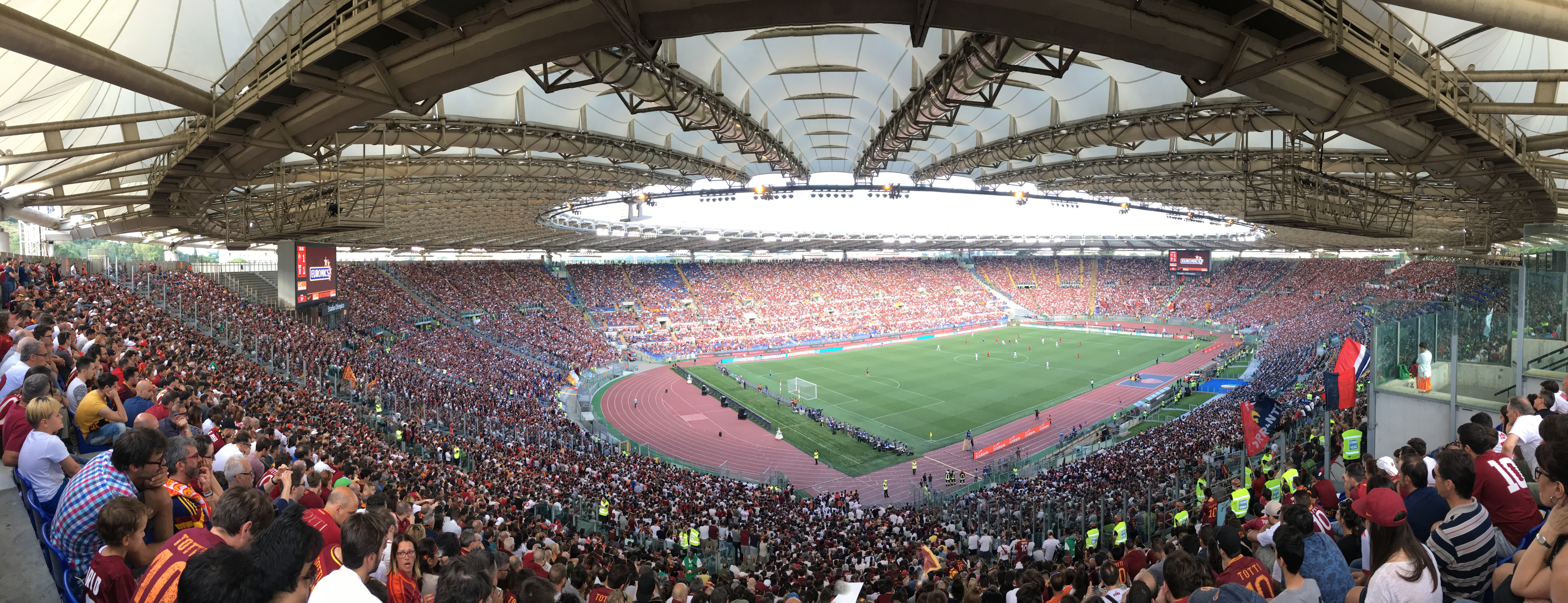
- The Stadio Olimpico in Rome held the match
- Event: Supercoppa Italiana
Juventus	Lazio
Serie A	Coppa Italia
2	3
- Date: 13 August 2017
- Venue: Stadio Olimpico, Rome
- Referee: Davide Massa
- Attendance: 52,000

The 2017 Supercoppa Italiana was the 30th edition of the Supercoppa Italiana. It was played on 13 August 2017 in Rome, Italy. With Juventus winning both the 2016–17 Serie A championship and the 2016–17 Coppa Italia, the game was played between Juventus and the 2016–17 Coppa Italia runners-up, Lazio. Lazio won the match 3–2 and claimed their fourth Supercoppa title.

== Match ==
=== Details ===
13 August 2017
20:45 CEST

Juventus	2–3	Lazio
Dybala 85', 90+1' (pen.)	Report	Immobile 32' (pen.), 54'; Murgia 90+3'

Stadio Olimpico, Rome
Attendance: 52,000
Referee: Davide Massa

Juventus	Lazio

GK	1	(Italy) Gianluigi Buffon (c)	(yellow card) 31'
RB	15	(Italy) Andrea Barzagli
CB	4	(Morocco) Medhi Benatia		(substituted off) 56'
CB	3	(Italy) Giorgio Chiellini
LB	12	(Brazil) Alex Sandro
CM	5	(Bosnia and Herzegovina) Miralem Pjanić	(yellow card) 73'
CM	6	(Germany) Sami Khedira
RW	7	(Colombia) Juan Cuadrado		(substituted off) 56'
AM	10	(Argentina) Paulo Dybala
LW	17	(Croatia) Mario Mandžukić	(yellow card) 52'	(substituted off) 72'
CF	9	(Argentina) Gonzalo Higuaín
Substitutes:
GK	16	(Italy) Carlo Pinsoglio
GK	23	(Poland) Wojciech Szczęsny
DF	2	(Italy) Mattia De Sciglio		(substituted in) 56'
DF	24	(Italy) Daniele Rugani
DF	26	(Switzerland) Stephan Lichtsteiner
MF	8	(Italy) Claudio Marchisio
MF	27	(Italy) Stefano Sturaro
MF	30	(Uruguay) Rodrigo Bentancur
FW	11	(Brazil) Douglas Costa		(substituted in) 56'
FW	33	(Italy) Federico Bernardeschi		(substituted in) 72'
FW	34	(Italy) Moise Kean
Manager:
(Italy) Massimiliano Allegri

GK	1	(Albania) Thomas Strakosha
RB	13	(Brazil) Wallace
CB	3	(Netherlands) Stefan de Vrij
LB	26	(Romania) Ștefan Radu
DM	6	(Brazil) Lucas Leiva	(yellow card) 41'	(substituted off) 80'
RW	8	(Serbia) Dušan Basta		(substituted off) 74'
CM	16	(Italy) Marco Parolo	(yellow card) 84'
CM	21	(Serbia) Sergej Milinković-Savić
LW	19	(Bosnia and Herzegovina) Senad Lulić (c)	(yellow card) 70'	(substituted off) 74'
SS	18	(Spain) Luis Alberto
CF	17	(Italy) Ciro Immobile	(yellow card) 89'
Substitutes:
GK	23	(Italy) Guido Guerrieri
GK	55	(Croatia) Ivan Vargić
DF	2	(Netherlands) Wesley Hoedt
DF	4	(Spain) Patric
DF	5	(Belgium) Jordan Lukaku		(substituted in) 74'
DF	27	(Brazil) Luiz Felipe
MF	10	(Brazil) Felipe Anderson
MF	88	(Italy) Davide Di Gennaro
MF	96	(Italy) Alessandro Murgia		(substituted in) 80'
FW	20	(Ecuador) Felipe Caicedo
FW	29	(Italy) Simone Palombi
FW	77	(Montenegro) Adam Marušić		(substituted in) 74'
Manager:
(Italy) Simone Inzaghi

Assistant referees:
Filippo Meli
Andrea Crispo
Fourth official:
Michael Fabbri
Additional assistant referees:
Massimiliano Irrati
Antonio Damato

Match rules

- 90 minutes.
- 30 minutes of extra time if necessary.
- Penalty shoot-out if scores still level.
- Twelve named substitutes, of which up to three may be used.

== See also ==
- 2017–18 Serie A
- 2017–18 Coppa Italia
- 2017–18 Juventus FC season
- 2017–18 SS Lazio season

Played between same clubs:

- 1998 Supercoppa Italiana
- 2013 Supercoppa Italiana
- 2015 Supercoppa Italiana
- 2019 Supercoppa Italiana
