= Stefan de Vrij =

Dutch footballer (born 1992)

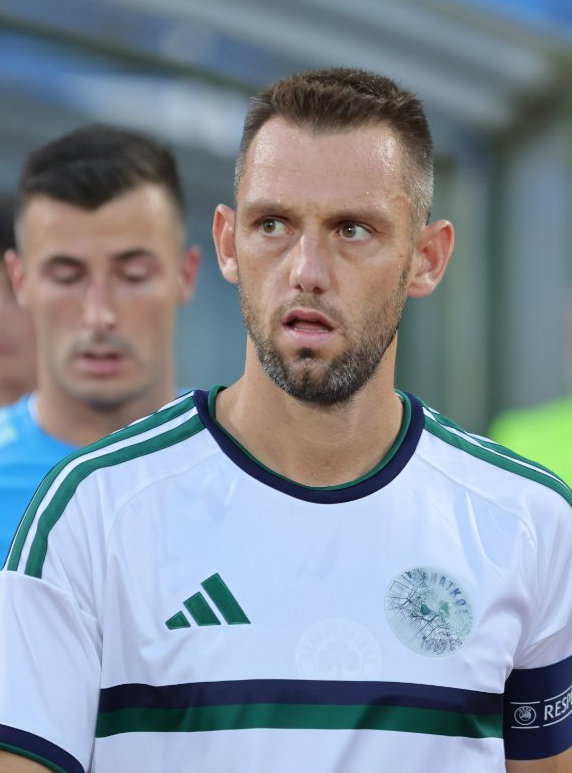
- De Vrij with Panathinaikos in 2026

Personal information
- Full name: Stefan de Vrij
- Date of birth: 5 February 1992 (age 34)
- Place of birth: Ouderkerk aan den IJssel, Netherlands
- Height: 1.89 m (6 ft 2 in)
- Position: Centre-back

Team information
- Current team: Panathinaikos
- Number: 6

Youth career
- 1997–2002: VV Spirit
- 2002–2009: Feyenoord

Senior career*
Years	Team	Apps	(Gls)
2009–2014	Feyenoord	135	(7)
2014–2018	Lazio	95	(8)
2018–2026	Inter Milan	213	(12)
2026–	Panathinaikos	10	(1)

International career^{‡}
2007–2008	Netherlands U16	3	(0)
2008–2009	Netherlands U17	18	(0)
2010–2011	Netherlands U19	9	(0)
2012	Netherlands U20	1	(0)
2011–2013	Netherlands U21	12	(0)
2012–	Netherlands	79	(4)
Medal record
Men's football
Representing Netherlands
FIFA World Cup
Bronze medal – third place	2014 Brazil	Team
UEFA European Championship
Bronze medal – third place	2024 Germany	Team
UEFA Nations League
Runner-up	2019 Portugal	Team
UEFA European Under-17 Championship
Runner-up	2009 Germany	Team
- * Club domestic league appearances and goals as of 8 November 2026 ‡ National team caps and goals as of 31 March 2026

Stefan de Vrij (Dutch pronunciation: [ˈstefan də ˈfrɛi]; born 5 February 1992) is a Dutch professional footballer who plays as a centre-back for Super League Greece club Panathinaikos, whom he captains, and the Netherlands national team.

De Vrij began his career at his local club VV Spirit, and debuted as a professional for Feyenoord at age 17. He spent five seasons at the Eredivisie club, serving briefly as captain, before joining Lazio in July 2014. Following four seasons in Rome, De Vrij switched to fellow Serie A club Inter Milan, where he won three league titles in eight years. Afterwards, De Vrij joined Panathinaikos in 2026.

A full international footballer since 2012, De Vrij has earned over 70 caps for the Netherlands. He was part of the Dutch team that finished third at the 2014 FIFA World Cup, and was selected for the Castrol Performance Index Team of the Tournament. He also played at UEFA Euro 2020 and Euro 2024, reaching the semi-finals of the latter.

== Early life ==
De Vrij grew up in Ouderkerk aan den IJssel. He is the youngest son of Jan de Vrij, who played for local club VV Spirit, where Stefan de Vrij started his career. His older brothers, Niels and Eric, played football in their youth and continued to different career paths.

== Club career ==
=== Feyenoord ===
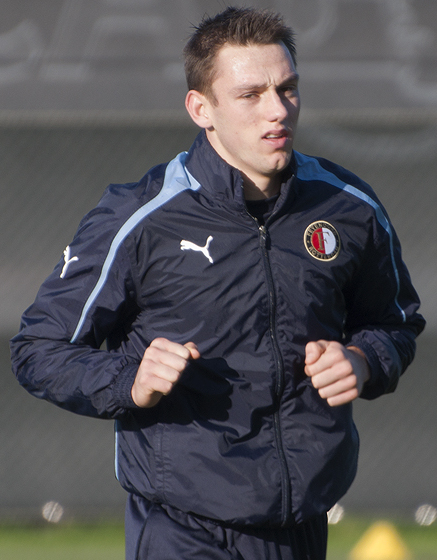
De Vrij training with Feyenoord in 2012

De Vrij played for local Ouderkerk aan den IJssel club VV Spirit for five seasons. At the age of ten, he attended a Feyenoord talent day. After various training sessions and a friendly match against ARC, De Vrij was officially asked to join Feyenoord's youth division. With VV Spirit, De Vrij often played as a central midfielder, but became a defender with Feyenoord. After playing for Feyenoord U15, De Vrij was one of the players to skip the U16 team to play in the U17 immediately.

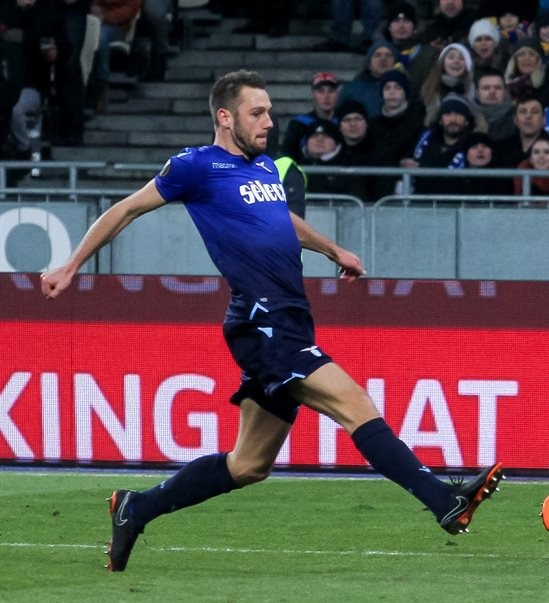
De Vrij playing for Lazio in 2018

On 17 July 2009, De Vrij signed his first professional contract with Feyenoord until summer 2012. De Vrij made his official debut for Feyenoord's first team on 24 September 2009, replacing Kelvin Leerdam in the 58th minute in the KNVB Cup away match against Harkemase Boys, which ended in a 0–5 loss for Feyenoord. On 6 December 2009, De Vrij made his Eredivisie debut in a 3–1 home victory against Groningen, replacing Denny Landzaat in the 89th minute. Aged 18 by its end, his first professional season saw him make 21 appearances, 17 of which were in the league.

In the 2012–13 season, De Vrij replaced Ron Vlaar as team captain. However, after a poor run of form in the following campaign, De Vrij was stripped of his armband as it was given first to star striker Graziano Pellè and then to vice-captain Jordy Clasie after the former struggled with disciplinary issues.

=== Lazio ===
On 30 July 2014, De Vrij joined Serie A club Lazio for an undisclosed fee. He said: "Lazio really proved that they wanted me and I am very happy I have made this move. I hope to become a more complete defender in Italy." De Vrij had been widely expected to follow his international manager Louis van Gaal to Manchester United.

On 24 August, De Vrij made his debut in the third round of the Coppa Italia, scoring the third goal of a 7–0 home victory third tier club Bassano Virtus. One week later, he played his first Serie A match as Lazio began the season with a 3–1 defeat against Milan. On 21 September, he was sent off in the 85th minute of a game away to Genoa which Lazio had been dominating, and two minutes later Mauricio Pinilla scored the only goal to give Genoa victory. De Vrij featured in the 2015 Coppa Italia Final on 20 May against Juventus, being substituted for Keita at half time in extra time in an eventual 2–1 defeat.

His second season began with the 2015 Supercoppa Italiana, playing the full 90 minutes of a 2–0 loss against Juventus in Shanghai. In September, he picked up a knee injury on international duty but was passed fit to play a further match for the Netherlands, infuriating Lazio's medical staff. He did not make a sufficient recovery, and was subjected to an operation the following month. In November, it was confirmed that he would miss the next six months due to the injury.

On 11 September 2016, De Vrij scored his first league goal in the 2016–17 Serie A during a 1–1 away draw against Chievo. In March 2018, Lazio's sporting director Igli Tare announced that De Vrij would be leaving the club on a free transfer in the summer.

=== Inter Milan ===
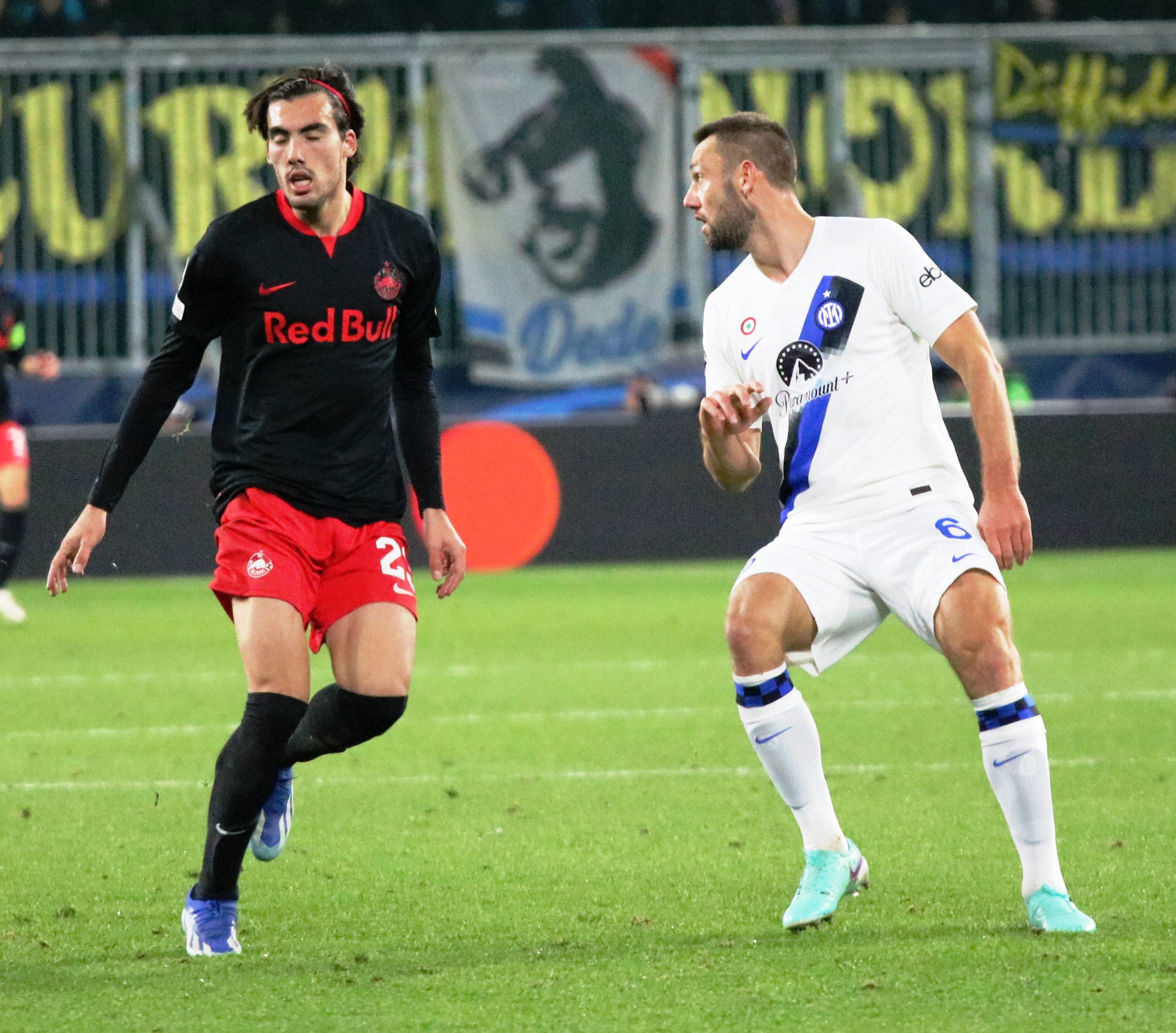
De Vrij (right) during Inter Milan's match against Red Bull Salzburg in November 2023

Following months of speculation, on 28 May 2018, De Vrij announced that he was going to join Inter Milan starting on 1 July. On 11 July, De Vrij was officially presented as an Inter player, signing a contract until June 2023. He received squad number 6 and made his competitive debut on 19 August on the opening championship week against Sassuolo. One week later, De Vrij scored his first goal for Nerazzurri, putting his side two goals up against Torino at home in an eventual 2–2 draw.

In September, De Vrij played his 100th match in Serie A in the 2–1 home victory against Fiorentina. He also made his first UEFA Champions League appearance in season opener against Tottenham Hotspur, assisting Matías Vecino's injury-time winner for a 2–1 home win. De Vrij eventually played 5 out of 6 matches in the competition's group stage, which saw en early elimination of Inter, instead continuing their European adventure in knockout phase of UEFA Europa League.

On 14 March 2019, in the second leg of Europa League round of 16, De Vrij's wrong ball control resulted fatal for Inter who conceded inside 5 minutes, and eventually lost the game to Eintracht Frankfurt 1–0 at San Siro, crashing out of competition 1–0 on aggregate. Three days later, De Vrij scored in the Derby della Madonnina match against rivals Milan, helping his team to win 3–2, taking back the third place in championship, and completing the first league double over them since 2011–12 season.

On 9 November 2019, in the 2019–20 season, De Vrij made his 50th appearance in all competitions for Inter in a 2–1 league victory against Verona at San Siro. On 8 July 2023, he extended his contract with the club until 2025. De Vrij left the club at the end of the 2025–26 season, having won the domestic double.

=== Panathinaikos ===
On 30 June 2026, De Vrij signed by Panathinaikos on a one-year contract.

== International career ==
=== Youth teams ===
De Vrij's strong development at Feyenoord led him to quickly receive his first call-up for the Netherlands national youth team. On 21 November 2007, the Netherlands U-16 won the friendly match against Ukraine U-16 (1–0), with him debuting the starting line-up with the former.

De Vrij participated at the 2009 UEFA European Under-17 Football Championship in Germany. The Dutch team, aided by a strong contingent of seven Feyenoord players in the squad, finished second after a 2–1 loss against Germany in extra-time of the final. He formed a partner with Dico Koppers in central defence and participated in every match the Oranje played without a substitute, making a notable contribution. With the second place on the European Championship, the Netherlands U17 qualified for the 2009 FIFA U-17 World Cup in Nigeria.

=== Senior team ===
==== 2010s ====
In May 2012, De Vrij was named in the provisional list of 36 players for UEFA Euro 2012, but was cut from the final 23-man squad. On 15 August, he made his debut under new manager Louis van Gaal in the Netherlands' 4–2 loss against Belgium in a friendly match. De Vrij was a member of the Netherlands' squad for the 2014 FIFA World Cup, where he scored his first international goal in a 5–1 victory against then-defending champions Spain in the team's opening group match on 13 June. He went on to play in all of the Netherlands' matches as they eventually finished in third place. De Vrij and Arjen Robben were the two Dutch players selected to the Team of the Tournament.

In the Netherlands' first match of UEFA Euro 2016 qualification away against the Czech Republic on 9 September 2014, De Vrij equalised with a header from Daley Blind's cross, but the Dutch lost 2–1. He headed the team into the lead after 13 minutes in an eventual 2–0 victory against Spain in a friendly match at the Amsterdam Arena on 31 March 2015, wearing the captain's armband after Wesley Sneijder's substitution as well. After the team had failed to qualify for both the UEFA Euro 2016 and 2018 FIFA World Cup, De Vrij was included in the Netherlands squad for the 2019 UEFA Nations League Finals, where he was an unused substitute in both the semi-final win against England and final loss to Portugal.

==== 2020s ====
In June 2021, De Vrij was included in coach Frank de Boer's squad for UEFA Euro 2020. He started all three group matches, as well as the team's 2–0 loss against the Czech Republic in the round of 16.

De Vrij was a member of the Dutch squad for the 2022 FIFA World Cup where he was an unused substitute in all five of the team's matches as they were knocked out by eventual winners Argentina at the quarter-final stage. On 29 May 2024, De Vrij was named in the Netherlands' squad for UEFA Euro 2024. On 6 July, he was awarded player of the match, scoring the equalizing goal in a 2–1 victory against Turkey in the quarter-final of the European competition.

== Personal life ==
In May 2024, De Vrij married Doina Turcanu, a Moldovan woman. They started dating in 2017 and have two children together.

== Career statistics ==
=== Club ===
As of match played 8 November 2026

Appearances and goals by club, season and competition
Club	Season	League			National cup (Note: Includes KNVB Cup, Coppa Italia, Greek Cup)		Europe		Other		Total	
Club	Season	Division	Apps	Goals	Apps	Goals	Apps	Goals	Apps	Goals	Apps	Goals
Feyenoord	2009–10	Eredivisie	17	1	5	0	—		—		22	1
Feyenoord	2010–11	Eredivisie	30	1	1	0	2 (Note: All appearances in UEFA Europa League)	0	—		33	1
Feyenoord	2011–12	Eredivisie	30	1	2	0	—		—		32	1
Feyenoord	2012–13	Eredivisie	26	0	3	0	3 (Note: Two appearances in UEFA Champions League, one appearance in UEFA Europa League)	0	—		32	0
Feyenoord	2013–14	Eredivisie	32	4	1	0	2	0	—		35	4
Feyenoord	Total		135	7	12	0	7	0	—		154	7
Lazio	2014–15	Serie A	30	0	5	1	—		—		35	1
Lazio	2015–16	Serie A	2	0	0	0	2	0	1 (Note: All appearances in Supercoppa Italiana)	0	5	0
Lazio	2016–17	Serie A	27	2	4	0	—		—		31	2
Lazio	2017–18	Serie A	36	6	3	0	7	1	1	0	47	7
Lazio	Total		95	8	12	1	9	1	2	0	118	10
Inter Milan	2018–19	Serie A	28	2	0	0	8 (Note: Five appearances in UEFA Champions League, three appearances in UEFA Europa League)	0	—		36	2
Inter Milan	2019–20	Serie A	34	4	2	0	10 (Note: Six appearances in UEFA Champions League, four appearances in UEFA Europa League)	0	—		46	4
Inter Milan	2020–21	Serie A	32	1	4	0	6 (Note: Appearances in UEFA Champions League)	0	—		42	1
Inter Milan	2021–22	Serie A	30	0	4	0	6	1	1	0	41	1
Inter Milan	2022–23	Serie A	27	1	3	0	7	0	1	0	38	1
Inter Milan	2023–24	Serie A	25	1	0	0	6	0	2	0	33	1
Inter Milan	2024–25	Serie A	26	3	3	0	9	0	5 (Note: Two appearances in Supercoppa Italiana, three appearances in FIFA Club World Cup)	0	43	3
Inter Milan	2025–26	Serie A	11	0	2	0	3	0	1	0	17	0
Inter Milan	Total		213	12	18	0	55	1	10	0	296	13
Panathinaikos	2026–27	Super League Greece	10	1	2	0	9 (Note: All appearances in UEFA Conference League)	0	—		21	1
Career total			453	28	44	1	80	2	12	0	589	31

=== International ===
As of match played 31 March 2026

Appearances and goals by national team and year
National team	Year	Apps	Goals
Netherlands	2012	2	0
Netherlands	2013	7	0
Netherlands	2014	16	2
Netherlands	2015	5	1
Netherlands	2016	0	0
Netherlands	2017	3	0
Netherlands	2018	4	0
Netherlands	2019	0	0
Netherlands	2020	6	0
Netherlands	2021	12	0
Netherlands	2022	4	0
Netherlands	2023	3	0
Netherlands	2024	11	1
Netherlands	2025	4	0
Netherlands	2026	2	0
Total		79	4

Scores and results list Netherlands' goal tally first, score column indicates score after each De Vrij goal.

List of international goals scored by Stefan de Vrij
No.	Date	Venue	Cap	Opponent	Score	Result	Competition
1	13 June 2014	Arena Fonte Nova, Salvador, Brazil	13	Spain	3–1	5–1	2014 FIFA World Cup
2	9 September 2014	Generali Arena, Prague, Czech Republic	21	Czech Republic	1–1	1–2	UEFA Euro 2016 qualifying
3	31 March 2015	Amsterdam Arena, Amsterdam, Netherlands	27	Spain	1–0	2–0	Friendly
4	6 July 2024	Olympiastadion, Berlin, Germany	69	Turkey	1–1	2–1	UEFA Euro 2024

== Honours ==
Lazio

- Supercoppa Italiana: 2017
- Coppa Italia runner-up: 2014–15, 2016–17

Inter Milan

- Serie A: 2020–21, 2023–24, 2025–26
- Coppa Italia: 2021–22, 2022–23, 2025–26
- Supercoppa Italiana: 2021, 2022, 2023
- UEFA Europa League runner-up: 2019–20
- UEFA Champions League runner-up: 2022–23, 2024–25

Netherlands

- FIFA World Cup third place: 2014

Individual

- FIFA World Cup All-Star Team: 2014
- Serie A Best Defender: 2019–20
- UEFA Europa League Squad of the Season: 2019–20
- Serie A Team of the Year: 2019–20, 2020–21
