= Davide Massa =

Italian football referee

- Born: 15 July 1981 (age 45); Imperia, Italy

Domestic
Years	League	Role
2010–2012	Serie B	Referee
2011–	Serie A	Referee

International
Years	League	Role
2014–	FIFA listed	Referee

Davide Massa (born 15 July 1981) is an Italian football referee who officiates in Serie A. He has been a FIFA referee since 2014, and is ranked as a UEFA elite category referee.

== Refereeing career ==
In 2011 he began officiating in Serie A. His first match as referee was on 23 January 2011 between Fiorentina and Lecce. In 2014, he was put on the FIFA referees list. He officiated his first senior international match on 8 June 2015 between Turkey and Bulgaria. In 2017, he was selected to officiate the 2017 Supercoppa Italiana between Juventus and Lazio.

Massa was selected as a referee for the 2017 UEFA European Under-19 Championship in Georgia and the 2019 FIFA U-20 World Cup in Poland. He has also officiated matches in the 2016–17 Qatar Stars League, 2017–18 Egyptian Premier League and 2022–23 Super League Greece.

On 4 April 2023, Massa was criticised for his decisions at Coppa Italia first leg match against Inter Milan and Juventus. First, he sent off Inter's Romelu Lukaku after celebrating his late equalizer. Lukaku was subject of racist chants during the match. He celebrated his goal with a "silencing the crowd" gesture where Massa evidently saw it as inciting the crowd. After the match ends, he sent off Inter goalkeeper's Samir Handanović and Juventus's Juan Cuadrado after they degenerate into a brawl. Afterwards, former Serie A referee Luca Marelli criticized Massa's decisions to send off Lukaku while Italian newspaper Corriere dello Sport suggest that Massa failed to keep a lid on things.

Weeks later, on 23 April 2023, Massa refereed the Super League Greece derby Olympiacos - AEK Athens 1-3 which caused huge complaints from the Olympiacos team with his refereeing, causing the invasion at the end of the match by Olympiacos officials, the president of Evangelos Marinakis and the fans of Olympiacos who clashed with the Police. After the end of the match, Massa wrote on the match sheet that when he left the field, he felt a hit on his genitals by people he did not recognize.

On 5 June 2025, Massa was assigned to referee the Serbia v Albania match in Tirana.
