= Simone Palombi =

Italian footballer (born 1996)

Personal information
- Date of birth: 23 April 1996 (age 30)
- Place of birth: Tivoli, Italy
- Height: 1.82 m (6 ft 0 in)
- Position: Forward

Team information
- Current team: Alcione
- Number: 96

Youth career
- Lazio

Senior career*
Years	Team	Apps	(Gls)
2016–2021	Lazio	1	(0)
2016–2017	→ Ternana (loan)	28	(8)
2018	→ Salernitana (loan)	14	(1)
2018–2019	→ Lecce (loan)	30	(8)
2019–2020	→ Cremonese (loan)	32	(6)
2020–2021	→ Pisa (loan)	34	(4)
2021–2023	Alessandria	31	(3)
2022–2023	→ Pordenone (loan)	22	(2)
2023–2024	Padova	32	(3)
2024–	Alcione	36	(10)

International career^{‡}
2014–2015	Italy U-19	3	(2)
2017–2018	Italy U-21	4	(0)
- * Club domestic league appearances and goals as of 21 October 2025 ‡ National team caps and goals as of 11 May 2019

Simone Palombi (born 23 April 1996) is an Italian professional footballer who plays as a forward for Serie C Group A club Alcione.

== Club career ==
Palombi made his professional debut in the Serie B for Ternana on 1 October 2016 in a game against Verona.

He made his Serie A debut for Lazio on 20 August 2017, when he started the game against SPAL.

On 19 July 2018, Palombi signed to Lecce on loan until 30 June 2019.

On 9 July 2019, Palombi joined to Serie B side Cremonese on loan with an option to buy.

On 24 September 2020 he moved on loan to Serie B club Pisa.

On 18 August 2021, he signed with Alessandria. On 3 August 2022, Palombi was loaned to Pordenone, with an option to buy.

On 21 August 2023, Palombi signed a two-year contract with Padova.

== International career ==
He made his debut with the Italy U21 team on 1 September 2017, in a friendly match against Spain.

== Honours ==
Lazio

- Supercoppa Italiana: 2017
