= Davide Di Gennaro =

Italian football player (born 1988)

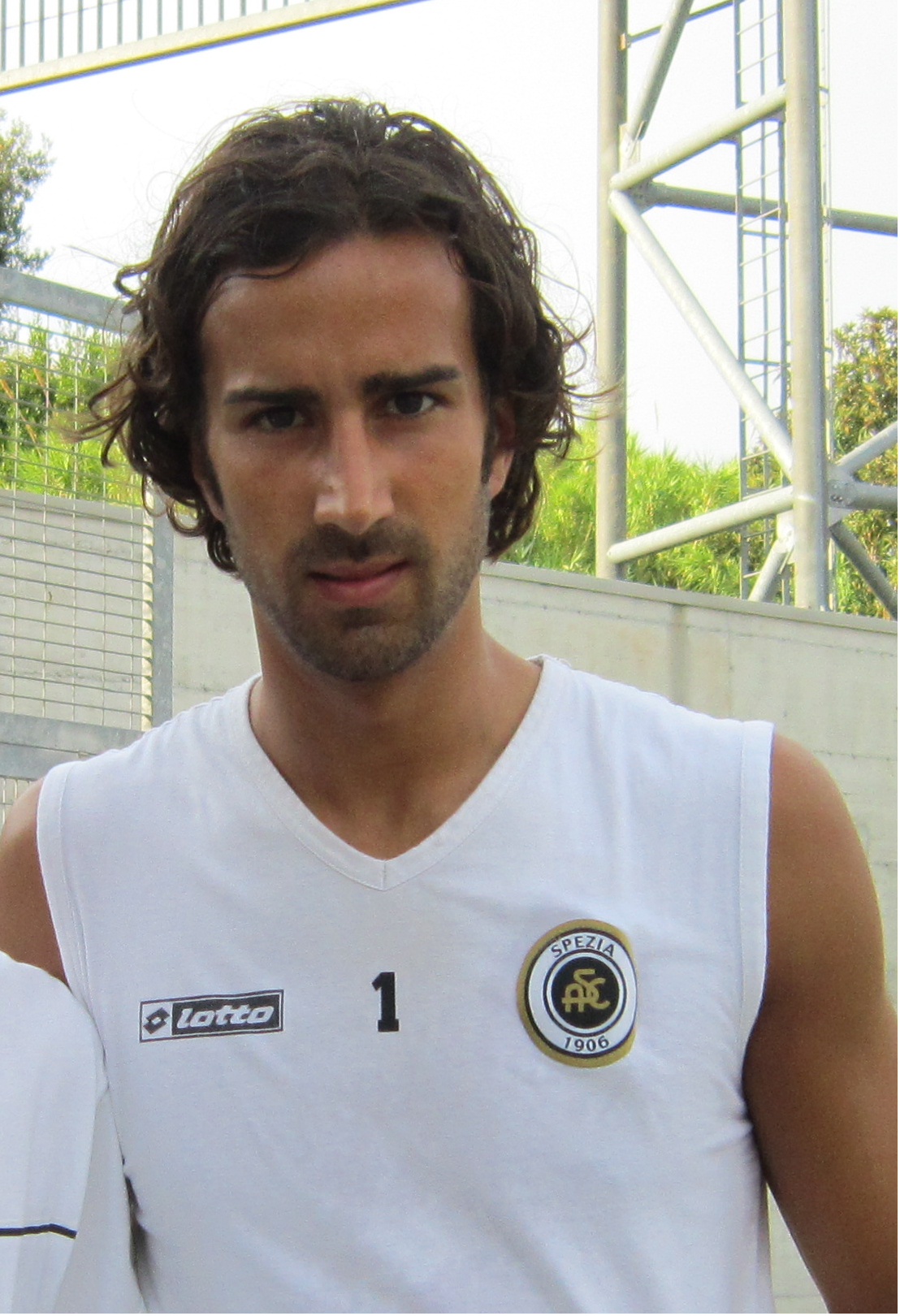
- Di Gennaro with Spezia in 2012

Personal information
- Date of birth: 16 June 1988 (age 38)
- Place of birth: Milan, Italy
- Height: 1.81 m (5 ft 11 in)
- Position: Attacking midfielder

Team information
- Current team: San Marzano

Youth career
- Cimiano
- 1995–2007: Milan

Senior career*
Years	Team	Apps	(Gls)
2007–2012	Milan	1	(0)
2007–2008	→ Bologna (loan)	22	(2)
2008–2009	→ Genoa (loan)	1	(0)
2008–2009	→ Reggina (loan)	24	(1)
2010	→ Livorno (loan)	11	(0)
2010–2011	→ Padova (loan)	17	(5)
2011–2012	→ Modena (loan)	32	(10)
2012–2013	Spezia	34	(9)
2013–2015	Palermo	14	(2)
2014–2015	→ Vicenza (loan)	39	(4)
2015–2017	Cagliari	51	(6)
2017–2021	Lazio	2	(0)
2018–2019	→ Salernitana (loan)	9	(0)
2019–2020	→ Juve Stabia (loan)	11	(1)
2021	Cesena	15	(3)
2021–2022	Bari	8	(0)
2022	Taranto	11	(2)
2022–2023	Portici	25	(15)
2023–	San Marzano	4	(0)

International career
2004	Italy U16	5	(0)
2004–2005	Italy U17	7	(2)
2005	Italy U18	2	(1)
2006	Italy U19	1	(0)
2007–2008	Italy U20	5	(0)
2007–2010	Italy U21	5	(0)
- * Club domestic league appearances and goals as of 8 October 2023

Davide Di Gennaro (born 16 June 1988) is an Italian professional footballer who plays as an attacking midfielder for Serie D club San Marzano.

== Club career ==
=== Early career ===
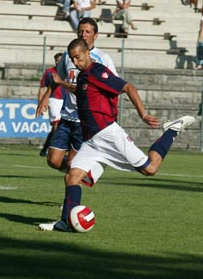
Di Gennaro playing for Bologna in 2007

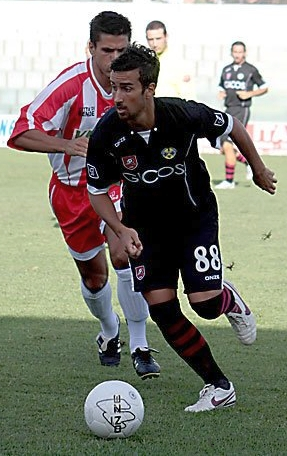
Di Gennaro with Reggina in 2008

Di Gennaro is a product of Milan's youth system, which he joined from amateur side Cimiano in 1995. There he went on to become the captain of their under-20 squad. On 19 May 2007, he made his first team debut, aged 18, in a Serie A game against Udinese. For the 2007–08 season the young midfielder was loaned out to Bologna in Serie B, where he scored two goal in 22 appearances, playing an important part in the club's promotion to Serie A.

=== Serie A debut ===
In August 2008, Di Gennaro was transferred to Genoa in a co-ownership deal, in compensation for Marco Borriello, who was brought back to Milan. Nevertheless, after only making one league appearance, he was loaned out to Reggina, just before the transfers deadline. Oddly enough, he scored his only goal of the season – his first in Serie A – in the game against Milan at the San Siro, on 7 February 2009. The Rossoneri later equalised and the match finished 1–1.

On 27 June 2009, Milan reclaimed Di Gennaro from the co-ownership with Genoa via a blind auction, after the two teams had failed to reach an agreement, for €1.25 million. Di Gennaro signed a new 3-year deal. However, during a pre-season friendly he suffered a broken metatarsal, which forced him out for the first months of the season. After recovering from the injury, he struggled to return to form, playing only two Coppa Italia games. To get some more playing time, on 29 January 2010 he was loaned to Livorno for the remainder of the season.

=== Padova ===
For the 2010–11 season, Di Gennaro has been sent on loan to Serie B club Calcio Padova. Like in the previous year, he suffered an injury during the pre-season, which would keep him out for one month. Following his recover, Di Gennaro made his official debut for the club in an away league game against Modena, which Padova lost 1–0, on 5 September 2010. Three weeks later, on 25 September, he also scored his first goal for the team, in a 2–0 win against Albinoleffe at home. He went on to score 5 goals in 17 league appearances throughout the season. ca. January 2011 Di Gennaro also added one more year to his Milan contract, to last until 30 June 2013.

=== Modena ===
Di Gennaro spent the 2011–12 season on another loan spell to Serie B club Modena, where he scored 10 goals in 32 league appearances.

=== Spezia ===
On 14 July 2012, Di Gennaro signed a permanent deal to join newly promoted Serie B team Spezia for €500,000. During the season, he made 34 appearances in Seria B, scoring 9 goals (5 of which were penalties). He also made one appearance in Coppa Italia, scoring a goal in a 1–2 loss against Cagliari.

=== Palermo ===
On 1 July 2013, he moved to Palermo for free, which Spezia write-down his residual contract value fully, Di Gennaro signed a three-year contract for Palermo.

=== Vicenza ===
On 8 September 2014, di Gennaro was signed by Vicenza, on loan.

=== Cagliari ===
After a great season with the Vicenza, in the summer of 2015 he moved to Cagliari, demoted to Serie B.

=== Lazio ===
On 21 July 2017, Di Gennaro was signed by Lazio on a three-year contract.

=== Salernitana ===
On 17 August 2018, Di Gennaro joined Salernitana in Serie B on a season-long loan from Lazio.

=== Juve Stabia ===
On 24 July 2019, he joined Juve Stabia on loan.

=== Later years ===
On 31 January 2021, he moved to Serie C club Cesena.

On 2 September 2021, he signed with Bari on a one-year contract with an option to renew. On 31 January 2022, his contract was terminated by mutual consent.

On 8 February 2022, Di Gennaro signed with Taranto until the end of the season.

On 13 October 2022, after having been released by Taranto, Di Gennaro joined Serie D club Portici.

== International career ==
Di Gennaro has played at various level of youth international football, collecting a total of 15 appearances, for the Italy U-16 to U-20 sides.

He was first officially called up to Italy U-21 on 17 November 2007 for the European qualifier away to the Faroe Islands, and made his debut with Italy U-21 on 18 November 2008, in a friendly against Germany.

== Career statistics ==
=== Club ===
As of 20 May 2018

Club	Season	League	Domestic League		Domestic Cup		European Competition^{1}		Other Tournaments^{2}		Total	
Club	Season	League	Apps	Goals	Apps	Goals	Apps	Goals	Apps	Goals	Apps	Goals
Milan	2006–07	Serie A	1	0	0	0	0	0	–		1	0
Bologna	2007–08	Serie B	22	2	2	0	–		–		24	2
Genoa	2008	Serie A	1	0	0	0	0	0	–		1	0
Reggina	2008–09	Serie A	24	1	1	0	–		–		25	1
Milan	2009–10	Serie A	0	0	2	0	0	0	–		2	0
Milan	Milan total		1	0	2	0	0	0	0	0	3	0
Livorno	2010	Serie A	11	0	0	0	–		–		11	0
Padova	2010–11	Serie B	17	5	0	0	–		–		17	5
Modena	2011–12	Serie B	32	10	2	1	–		–		34	11
Spezia	2012–13	Serie B	34	9	1	1	–		–		35	10
Palermo	2013–14	Serie B	14	2	1	0	–		–		15	2
Vicenza	2014–15	Serie B	39	4	0	0	–		–		39	4
Cagliari	2015–16	Serie B	31	4	3	0	–		–		34	4
Cagliari	2016–17	Serie A	20	2	2	0	–		–		22	2
Lazio	2017–18	Serie A	2	0	0	0	3	0	0	0	5	0
Career Total			248	39	12	2	3	0	0	0	263	41

Notes

^{1}European competitions include the UEFA Champions League and UEFA Cup
^{2}Other tournaments include nothing to date

== Honours ==
A.C. Milan

- UEFA Champions League: 2006–07

Lazio

- Supercoppa Italiana: 2017
