= 2020–21 US Salernitana 1919 season =

Salernitana
2020-21 season
- Chairman: Marco Mezzaroma; Claudio Lotito
- Manager: Fabrizio Castori
- Stadium: Stadio Arechi
- Serie B: 2nd (promoted)
- Coppa Italia: Third round
- Top goalscorer: League: Gennaro Tutino (13 goals); All: Gennaro Tutino (14 goals)
Home colours	Away colours

The 2020–21 U.S. Salernitana 1919 season was the club's 101st season in existence. During this season, the club competed in the Serie B and the Coppa Italia.

After several seasons at the Serie B level, Salernitana won promotion to Serie A at the end of the season under the tenure of head coach Fabrizio Castori.

== Current squad ==
As of 10 October 2020

Note: Flags indicate national team as defined under FIFA eligibility rules; some limited exceptions apply. Players may hold more than one non-FIFA nationality.

No.	Pos.	Nation	Player
1	GK	LTU	Marius Adamonis (on loan from Lazio)
3	DF	URU	Wálter López
5	DF	ITA	Valerio Mantovani
7	FW	CIV	Cedric Gondo (on loan from Lazio)
8	MF	ITA	Andrea Schiavone (on loan from Bari)
9	FW	ITA	Gennaro Tutino (on loan from Napoli)
10	MF	ITA	Emanuele Cicerelli (on loan from Lazio)
11	FW	BIH	Milan Đurić
12	GK	ITA	Alessandro Micai
13	DF	ITA	Ramzi Aya
14	MF	ITA	Francesco Di Tacchio (captain)
15	DF	ARG	Tiago Casasola (on loan from Lazio)
16	DF	CYP	Andreas Karo (on loan from Lazio)
17	MF	ITA	Edoardo Iannoni
18	MF	ITA	André Anderson (on loan from Lazio)

No.	Pos.	Nation	Player
20	MF	POL	Tomasz Kupisz (on loan from Bari)
21	FW	USA	Giuseppe Barone
22	GK	ITA	Guido Guerrieri
23	DF	SVK	Norbert Gyömbér
26	DF	CRO	Luka Bogdan (on loan from Livorno)
27	MF	POL	Patryk Dziczek (on loan from Lazio)
28	MF	ITA	Leonardo Capezzi
32	FW	ITA	Niccolò Giannetti
33	DF	ALB	Frédéric Veseli
34	GK	ITA	Stefano Russo
48	FW	ITA	Mirko Antonucci (on loan from Roma)
72	GK	SLO	Vid Belec
87	MF	ITA	Cristiano Lombardi (on loan from Lazio)
97	DF	SEN	Joel Baraye (on loan from Padova)

=== Other players under contract ===
Note: Flags indicate national team as defined under FIFA eligibility rules; some limited exceptions apply. Players may hold more than one non-FIFA nationality.

No.	Pos.	Nation	Player
—	DF	ITA	Antonio Granata

=== Out on loan ===
Note: Flags indicate national team as defined under FIFA eligibility rules; some limited exceptions apply. Players may hold more than one non-FIFA nationality.

No.	Pos.	Nation	Player
—	GK	ITA	Antonio Russo (at Bisceglie)
—	DF	BRA	Felipe Curcio (at Padova)
—	DF	ITA	Mirko Esposito (at Mantova)
—	DF	ITA	Gioacchino Galeotafiore (at Foggia)
—	DF	ITA	Sedrick Kalombo (at Foggia)
—	MF	ITA	Luca Castiglia (at Modena)
—	MF	ITA	Clemente Crisci (at ACR Messina)
—	MF	ITA	Marco Firenze (at Novara)

No.	Pos.	Nation	Player
—	MF	ITA	Gaetano Vitale (at Foggia)
—	FW	ITA	Iacopo Cernigoi (at Juve Stabia)
—	FW	ITA	Filippo D'Andrea (at Foggia)
—	FW	ITA	Giuseppe Fella (at Avellino)
—	FW	ITA	Carmine Iannone (at Foggia)
—	FW	ITA	Antonino Musso (at Bisceglie)
—	FW	ITA	Francesco Orlando (at Juve Stabia)

== Transfers ==
=== Out ===
Note: Flags indicate national team as defined under FIFA eligibility rules; some limited exceptions apply. Players may hold more than one non-FIFA nationality.

No.	Pos.	Nation	Player
—	GK	ITA	Antonio Russo (at Bisceglie)
—	DF	BRA	Felipe Curcio (at Padova)
—	DF	ITA	Mirko Esposito (at Mantova)
—	DF	ITA	Gioacchino Galeotafiore (at Foggia)
—	DF	ITA	Sedrick Kalombo (at Foggia)
—	MF	ITA	Luca Castiglia (at Modena)
—	MF	ITA	Clemente Crisci (at ACR Messina)
—	MF	ITA	Marco Firenze (at Novara)

No.	Pos.	Nation	Player
—	MF	ITA	Gaetano Vitale (at Foggia)
—	FW	ITA	Iacopo Cernigoi (at Juve Stabia)
—	FW	ITA	Filippo D'Andrea (at Foggia)
—	FW	ITA	Giuseppe Fella (at Avellino)
—	FW	ITA	Carmine Iannone (at Foggia)
—	FW	ITA	Antonino Musso (at Bisceglie)
—	FW	ITA	Francesco Orlando (at Juve Stabia)

== Competitions ==
=== Club Friendlies ===
29 August 2020 Friendly	(Italy) Salernitana	1–1	(Italy) Fermana	Sarnano
17:30		Report		Stadium: Stadio Maurelli

5 September 2020 Friendly	(Italy) Salernitana	3–1	(Italy) Ternana	Sarnano
17:30		Report		Stadium: Stadio Maurelli

12 September 2020 Friendly	(Italy) Salernitana	1–1	(Italy) Virtus Francavilla	Salerno
12:00		Report		Stadium: Stadio Arechi

=== Serie B ===
==== League table ====
Pos	Team	Pld	W	D	L	GF	GA	GD	Pts	Promotion, qualification or relegation
1	Empoli (C, P)	38	19	16	3	68	35	+33	73	Promotion to Serie A
2	Salernitana (P)	38	19	12	7	46	34	+12	69	Promotion to Serie A
3	Monza	38	17	13	8	51	33	+18	64	Qualification for promotion play-offs semi-finals
4	Lecce	38	16	14	8	68	47	+21	62	Qualification for promotion play-offs semi-finals
5	Venezia (O, P)	38	15	14	9	53	39	+14	59	Qualification for promotion play-offs preliminary round

Source: Lega Serie B (in Italian), Soccerway (in English)
Rules for classification: 1) Points; 2) Head-to-head points; 3) Head-to-head goal difference; 4) Goal difference; 5) Goals scored; 6) Draw.
(C) Champions; (O) Play-off winners; (P) Promoted

==== Results summary ====
Overall								Home						Away					
Pld	W	D	L	GF	GA	GD	Pts	W	D	L	GF	GA	GD	W	D	L	GF	GA	GD
38	19	12	7	46	34	+12	69	11	6	2	26	13	+13	8	6	5	20	21	−1

Last updated: 10 May 2021.
Source: Soccerway

==== Results By Round ====
Round	1	2	3	4	5	6	7	8	9	10	11	12	13	14	15	16	17	18	19	20	21	22	23	24	25	26	27	28	29	30	31	32	33	34	35	36	37	38
Ground	H	A	H	A	H	H	A	H	A	H	A	H	A	H	A	A	H	A	H	A	H	A	H	A	A	H	A	H	A	H	A	H	A	H	H	A	H	A
Result/	D	W	W	D	W	W	L	W	W	W	L	D	D	W	W	L	L	L	W	D	D	D	D	W	D	D	W	D	D	W	L	W	W	W	L	W	W	W
Position	9	6	2	3	2	4	7	1	1	1	1	2	2	1	1	2	2	5	3	4	4	4	5	3	3	4	3	3	4	3	4	3	3	3	3	2	2	2

Updated to match(es) played on 10 May 2021. Source: Serie B
A = Away; H = Home; W = Win; D = Draw; L = Loss

==== Matches ====
26 September 2020 1	Salernitana	1–1	Reggina	Salerno
14:00	Tutino (yellow card) 33'; Veseli (yellow card) 56'; Migliorini (yellow card) 82'; Casasola 84'; Schiavone (yellow card) 89'	Report	Loiacono (yellow card) 53'; Rossi (yellow card) 62'; Ménez 83'	Stadium: Stadio Arechi; Attendance: 0 Referee: (Italy) Michael Fabbri

3 October 2020 2	Chievo	1–2	Salernitana	Verona
14:15	Mogoș (yellow card) 20' (goal) 24'; Rigione (yellow card) 89'; Obi (yellow card) 90+5' (red card) 90+5'	Report	López (yellow card) 20'; Tutino 34'; Đurić 64'; Aya (yellow card) 89'	Stadium: Stadio Marcantonio Bentegodi; Attendance: 1,000; Referee: (Italy) Luca Massimi

17 October 2020 3	Salernitana	4–1	Pisa	Salerno
14:00		Report		Stadium: Stadio Arechi; Attendance: 100; Referee: (Italy) Davide Ghersini

20 October 2020 4	Vicenza	1–1	Salernitana	Vicenza
21:00	Padella (yellow card) 24'; Rigoni 43'; Beruatto (yellow card) 61'; Bruscagin (yellow card) 77'	Report	Di Tacchio (yellow card) 16'; Đurić 25' (pen.); Casasola (yellow card) 89'	Stadium: Stadio Romeo Menti; Attendance: 818; Referee: (Italy) Lorenzo Illuzzi

24 October 2020 5	Salernitana	1–0	Ascoli	Salerno
14:00	Di Tacchio (yellow card) 62'; Cicerelli (yellow card) 74'; Anderson 87'; Casasola (yellow card) 89'; Dziczek (yellow card) 89'	Report	Brosco (yellow card) 90+1'; Kragl (yellow card) 90+5'	Stadium: Stadio Arechi; Attendance: 496; Referee: (Italy) Antonio Giua

31 October 2020 6	Salernitana	3–0	Reggiana	Salerno
16:00		Report		Stadium: Stadio Arechi; Attendance: 0 Referee: (Italy) Matteo Marchetti

6 November 2020 7	SPAL	2–0	Salernitana	Ferrara
21:00	Valoti 6'; Dickmann (yellow card) 36'; Di Francesco 41'; Missiroli (yellow card) 60'; Tomović (yellow card) 81'; Ranieri (yellow card) 90+3'	Report	Di Tacchio (yellow card) 3'; Dziczek (yellow card) 50'; Aya (yellow card) 59'; Giannetti (yellow card) 83'; Tutino (yellow card) 90+2'; Casasola (yellow card) 90+3'	Stadium: Stadio Paolo Mazza; Attendance: 0 Referee: (Italy) Ivano Pezzuto

23 November 2020 8	Salernitana	2–1	Cremonese	Salerno
21:00	Đurić 28'; Casasola (yellow card) 62'; Kupisz 70' (yellow card) 75'; López (yellow card) 86'	Report	Valzania 1'; Bianchetti (yellow card) 13'; Castagnetti (yellow card) 17'; Crescenzi (yellow card) 43'	Stadium: Stadio Arechi; Attendance: 0 Referee: (Italy) Riccardo Ros

29 November 2020 9	Cosenza	0–1	Salernitana	Cosenza
21:00	Bruccini (yellow card) 25'; Idda (yellow card) 52'; Ba (yellow card) 78' (yellow-red card) 81'; Petre (yellow card) 88'	Report	Dziczek (yellow card) 8'; Di Tacchio (yellow card) 42'; Tutino 50'; Anderson (yellow card) 67'; Gyömbér (yellow card) 70'; Bogdan (yellow card) 75'	Stadium: Stadio San Vito-Gigi Marulla; Attendance: 0 Referee: (Italy) Federico Dionisi

5 December 2020 10	Salernitana	1–0	Cittadella	Salerno
14:00	Adamonis (yellow card) 42'; Gyömbér (yellow card) 59'; Bogdan 86' (yellow card) 87'	Report	Perticone (yellow card) 19'; Adorni (yellow card) 58'; Tsadjout (yellow card) 60'; Pavan (yellow card) 78'; Gargiulo (yellow card) 84'	Stadium: Stadio Arechi; Attendance: 0 Referee: (Italy) Alessandro Prontera

12 December 2020 11	Brescia	3–1	Salernitana	Brescia
14:00	van de Looi 3'; Špalek 21'; Ragusa (yellow card) 36'; Dessena (yellow card) 73'; Bjarnason 76'	Report	Tutino 43' (pen.); Di Tacchio (yellow card) 48'; Anderson (yellow card) 62'	Stadium: Stadio Mario Rigamonti; Attendance: 0 Referee: (Italy) Gianluca Aureliano

15 December 2020 12	Salernitana	1–1	Lecce	Salerno
21:00	Capezzi 11'; Dziczek (yellow card) 29'; Đurić (yellow card) 30'; Tutino (yellow card) 74'; Giannetti (yellow card) 90+6'	Report	Coda (yellow card) 29'; Mancosu 53' (pen.); Stępiński (yellow card) 90+2'	Stadium: Stadio Arechi; Attendance: 0 Referee: (Italy) Daniele Chiffi

18 December 2020 13	Frosinone	0–0	Salernitana	Frosinone
21:00	Carraro (yellow card) 75'; Curado (yellow card) 90+5'	Report	Aya (yellow card) 73'	Stadium: Stadio Benito Stirpe; Attendance: 0 Referee: Eugenio Abbattista

21 December 2020 14	Salernitana	2–1	Virtus Entella	Salerno
21:00	Tutino 47'; Schiavone (yellow card) 57'; Đurić 66' (pen.); Veseli (yellow card) 77'	Report	Bonini (yellow card) 6'; Mancosu 38'; Poli (yellow card) 65'; Cleur (yellow card) 74'; Petrović (yellow card) 90+1'	Stadium: Stadio Arechi; Attendance: 0 Referee: Davide Ghersini

27 December 2020 15	Venezia	1–2	Salernitana	Venezia
15:00	Bjarkason (yellow card) 53'; Črnigoj 90'	Report	Di Tacchio (yellow card) 1'; Anderson 34', 38'; López (yellow card) 36'	Stadium: Stadio Pier Luigi Penzo; Attendance: 0 Referee: Luca Pairetto

30 December 2020 16	Monza	3–0	Salernitana	Monza
16:00	Balotelli 4'; Barillà 45'; Bellusci (yellow card) 55'; Armellino 90+5'	Report	Gyömbér (yellow card) 26'; Đurić (yellow card) 30'	Stadium: Stadio Brianteo; Attendance: 0 Referee: Juan Luca Sacchi

4 January 2021 17	Salernitana	0–2	Pordenone	Salerno
18:00	Capezzi (red card) 29'; Di Tacchio (yellow card) 38' (yellow-red card) 80'; Tutino (yellow card) 42'; Gyömbér (yellow card) 72'; Đurić (yellow card) 76'; Anderson (yellow card) 90+5'	Report	Diaw (yellow card) 51', (goal) 90+3'; Ciurria (yellow card) 62'; Barison 73'; Falasco (yellow card) 77'; Musiolik (yellow card) 82'	Stadium: Stadio Arechi; Attendance: 0 Referee: Antonio Rapuano

17 January 2021 18	Empoli	5–0	Salernitana	Empoli
21:00	Ricci 19'; Štulac 28'; Mancuso 35'; Nikolaou (yellow card) 38'; Parisi 42'; Haas (yellow card) 84'; Żurkowski (yellow card) 84'; Matos 87'	Report	Anderson (yellow card) 10'; Dziczek (yellow card) 11'	Stadium: Stadio Carlo Castellani; Attendance: 0 Referee: Luca Pairetto

23 January 2021 19	Salernitana	2–0	Pescara	Salerno
16:00	Gondo 8', (yellow card) 28'; Mantovani (yellow card) 9'; Cicerelli 25'; Casasola (yellow card) 75'; Giannetti (yellow card) 86'	Report	Maistro (yellow card) 21'; Pepín (yellow card) 45+1'	Stadium: Stadio Arechi; Attendance: 0 Referee: Valerio Marini

1 February 2021 20	Reggina	0–0	Salernitana	Reggio Calabria
21:00	Montalto (yellow card) 43'; Nícolas (yellow card) 50'; Loiacono (yellow card) 86'	Report	Gondo (yellow card) 45+1'; Di Tacchio (yellow card) 47'; Đurić (penalty missed); Coulibaly (yellow card) 55'; Kiyine (yellow card) 78'; Bogdan (yellow card) 90+2'	Stadium: Stadio Oreste Granillo; Attendance: 0 Referee: Rosario Abisso

6 February 2021 21	Salernitana	1–1	Chievo	Salerno
14:00	Tutino 23'; Coulibaly (yellow card) 41'; Belec (yellow card) 51'; Gyömbér (yellow card) 79'	Report	De Luca 50'; Viviani (yellow card) 90+1'	Stadium: Stadio Arechi; Attendance: 0 Referee: Simone Sozza

9 February 2021 22	Pisa	2–2	Salernitana	Pisa
19:00	Benedetti (yellow card) 12'; Vido (yellow card) 41'; Mazzitelli 53'; Marconi 73'; Marin (yellow card) 87'	Report	Kiyine (yellow card) 26'; Coulibaly (yellow card) 44'; Tutino 76'; Casasola 90+3', (yellow card) 90+5'	Stadium: Arena Garibaldi; Attendance: 0 Referee: Alessandro Prontena

13 February 2021 23	Salernitana	1–1	Vicenza	Salerno
12:00	Tutino (penalty missed); Đurić (yellow card) 33'; Aya 81'	Report	Rigoni (yellow card) 13'; Giacomelli (yellow card) 81', (goal) 83'	Stadium: Stadio Arechi; Attendance: 0 Referee: Giacomo Camplone

20 February 2021 24	Ascoli	0–2	Salernitana	Ascoli Piceno
14:00	Sabiri (yellow card) 29'	Report	Tutino 2', 24'; Coulibaly (yellow card) 32'; Gyömbér (yellow card) 45'; Veseli (yellow card) 77'	Stadium: Stadio Cino e Lillo Del Duca; Attendance: 0 Referee: Eugenio Abbattista

26 February 2021 25	Reggiana	0–0	Salernitana	Reggio Emilia
19:00	Del Pinto (yellow card) 36'	Report	Di Tacchio (yellow card) 20'	Stadium: Mapei Stadium – Città del Tricolore; Attendance: 0 Referee: Marco Serra

2 March 2021 26	Salernitana	0–0	SPAL	Salerno
19:00	Kiyine (yellow card) 37'	Report	Berisha (yellow card) 88'	Stadium: Stadio Arechi; Attendance: 0 Referee: (Italy) Massimiliano Irrati

6 March 2021 27	Cremonese	0–1	Salernitana	Cremona
14:00	Báez (yellow card) 42'; Ravanelli (yellow card) 66'	Report	Đurić 14'; Aya (yellow card) 78'	Stadium: Stadio Giovanni Zini; Attendance: 0 Referee: (Italy) Lorenzo Illuzzi

13 March 2021 28	Salernitana	0–0	Cosenza	Salerno
16:00 CET	Kiyine (yellow card) 52'	Report	Gerbo (yellow card) 23'; Petrucci (yellow card) 29' (yellow-red card) 48'; Crecco (yellow card) 88'	Stadium: Stadio Arechi; Attendance: 0 Referee: (Italy) Manuel Volpi

16 March 2021 29	Cittadella	0–0	Salernitana	Cittadella
19:00 CET	Iori (yellow card) 57'; Adorni (yellow card) 65'	Report	Gyömbér (yellow card) 59'; Jaroszyński (yellow card) 70'; Anderson (yellow card) 79'	Stadium: Stadio Pier Cesare Tombolato; Attendance: 0 Referee: (Italy) Gianluca Manganiello

21 March 2021 30	Salernitana	1–0	Brescia	Salerno
21:00 CET	Bogdan 24'; Gondo (yellow card) 61'	Report	Ayé (yellow card) 68'; Ndoj (yellow card) 79'; Chancellor (yellow card) 82'	Stadium: Stadio Arechi; Attendance: 0 Referee: (Italy) Antonio Santoro

=== Copa Italia ===
30 September 2020 Second Round	Salernitana	3–0	Südtirol	Salerno
18:00	Di Tacchio (yellow card) 32'; Tutino 53'; Cicerelli 60'; Capezzi 88'	Report	Davì (yellow card) 65' (yellow-red card) 76'	Stadium: Stadio Arechi; Attendance: 0 Referee: (Italy) Daniele Paterna

27 October 2020 Second Round	Sampdoria	1–0	Salernitana	Genova
14:00	Adrien Silva (yellow card) 10'; La Gumina 54'; Jankto (yellow card) 82'	Report	Dziczek (yellow card) 12'; Đurić (yellow card) 88'	Stadium: Stadio Luigi Ferraris; Attendance: 0 Referee: (Italy) Alessandro Prontera
