= 2021–22 SS Lazio season =

Lazio
2021–22 season
- Owner: Claudio Lotito
- Chairman: Claudio Lotito
- Head coach: Maurizio Sarri
- Stadium: Stadio Olimpico
- Serie A: 5th
- Coppa Italia: Quarter-finals
- UEFA Europa League: Knockout round play-offs
- Top goalscorer: League: Ciro Immobile (27); All: Ciro Immobile (32)
- Biggest win: Lazio 6–1 Spezia
- Biggest defeat: Bologna 3–0 Lazio; Hellas Verona 4–1 Lazio
Home colours	Away colours	Third colours

The 2021–22 season was the 122nd season in the existence of S.S. Lazio and the club's 34th consecutive season in the top flight of Italian football. In addition to the domestic league, Lazio participated in this season's editions of the Coppa Italia and the UEFA Europa League.

== Players ==
=== First-team squad ===
As of 31 January 2022

Note: Flags indicate national team as defined under FIFA eligibility rules; some limited exceptions apply. Players may hold more than one non-FIFA nationality.

No.	Pos.	Nation	Player
1	GK	ALB	Thomas Strakosha
3	DF	ITA	Luiz Felipe
4	DF	ESP	Patric
6	MF	BRA	Lucas Leiva
7	MF	BRA	Felipe Anderson
8	MF	CIV	Jean-Daniel Akpa Akpro
9	FW	ESP	Pedro
10	FW	ESP	Luis Alberto
11	FW	CPV	Jovane Cabral (on loan from Sporting CP)
17	FW	ITA	Ciro Immobile (captain)
18	FW	ARG	Luka Romero
20	MF	ITA	Mattia Zaccagni (on loan from Hellas Verona)
21	MF	SRB	Sergej Milinković-Savić

No.	Pos.	Nation	Player
23	DF	ALB	Elseid Hysaj
25	GK	ESP	Pepe Reina
26	DF	ROU	Ștefan Radu
27	FW	ESP	Raúl Moro
28	MF	ITA	André Anderson
29	MF	ITA	Manuel Lazzari
31	GK	LTU	Marius Adamonis
32	MF	ITA	Danilo Cataldi
33	DF	ITA	Francesco Acerbi
44	DF	ITA	Romano Floriani Mussolini
77	DF	MNE	Adam Marušić
88	MF	CRO	Toma Bašić

=== Other players under contract ===
As of 31 January 2022

Note: Flags indicate national team as defined under FIFA eligibility rules; some limited exceptions apply. Players may hold more than one non-FIFA nationality.

No.	Pos.	Nation	Player
—	DF	ITA	Luca Falbo
—	DF	SRB	Dimitrije Kamenović

No.	Pos.	Nation	Player
—	DF	POR	Jorge Silva
—	MF	POL	Patryk Dziczek

== Transfers ==
=== In ===
Date	Pos.	Player	Age	Moving from	Fee	Notes	Source
1 July 2021	DF	(Serbia) Dimitrije Kamenović	20	(Serbia) Čukarički	€2,500,000		
16 July 2021	MF	(Brazil) Felipe Anderson	28	(England) West Ham United	€3,000,000		
17 July 2021	DF	(Albania) Elseid Hysaj	27	(Italy) Napoli	Free		
20 July 2021	FW	(Argentina) Luka Romero	16	(Spain) Mallorca	€200,000		
19 August 2021	FW	(Spain) Pedro	34	(Italy) Roma	Undisclosed		
25 August 2021	MF	(Croatia) Toma Bašić	24	(France) Bordeaux	€6,860,000		
31 August 2021	MF	(Italy) Mattia Zaccagni	26	(Italy) Hellas Verona	Loan	Loan until the end of the season	
31 January 2022	FW	(Cape Verde) Jovane Cabral	23	(Portugal) Sporting CP	Loan (€1,000,000)	Loan until the end of the season with option to buy for €8,000,000	

=== Out ===
Date	Pos.	Player	Age	Moving to	Fee	Notes	Source
30 June 2021	MF	(Bosnia and Herzegovina) Senad Lulić	35	Free agent	Free		
30 June 2021	MF	(Italy) Marco Parolo	36	Free agent	Free		
30 June 2021	DF	(Argentina) Mateo Musacchio	30	Free agent	Free		
30 June 2021	DF	(Italy) Damiano Franco	19	(Italy) Reggina	Free		
30 June 2021	MF	(Poland) Szymon Czyż	19	(Poland) Warta Poznań	Free		
30 June 2021	MF	(Brazil) Andreas Pereira	25	(England) Manchester United	End of loan	Loan until the end of the season	
30 June 2021	DF	(Netherlands) Wesley Hoedt	27	(England) Southampton	End of loan	Loan until the end of the season	
30 June 2021	GK	(Brazil) Gabriel Pereira	18	(France) Monaco	End of loan	Loan until the end of the season	
21 July 2021	GK	(Albania) Marco Alia	21	(Italy) Monterosi	Loan	Loan until the end of the season	
22 July 2021	DF	(Albania) Sergio Kalaj	21	(Italy) Carrarese	Free		
3 August 2021	DF	(Italy) Mattia Novella	20	(Italy) Monopoli	Loan	Loan until the end of the season	
10 August 2021	DF	(Italy) Nicolò Armini	20	(Italy) Piacenza	Loan	Loan until the end of the season	
18 August 2021	FW	(Italy) Simone Palombi	25	(Italy) Alessandria	Free		
26 August 2021	FW	(Argentina) Joaquín Correa	27	(Italy) Inter	Loan (€6,000,000)	Loan until the end of the season with option to buy for €23,600,000	
31 August 2021	FW	(Ecuador) Felipe Caicedo	32	(Italy) Genoa	€2,000,000		
31 August 2021	DF	(Argentina) Tiago Casasola	26	(Italy) Frosinone	Loan	Loan until the end of the season	
31 August 2021	MF	(Italy) Fabio Maistro	23	(Italy) Ascoli	Loan	Loan until the end of season	
31 August 2021	DF	(Albania) Angelo Ndrecka	19	(Italy) Teramo	Loan	Loan until the end of season	
31 August 2021	FW	(Italy) Emanuele Cicerelli	27	(Italy) Frosinone	Loan	Loan until the end of the season	
5 January 2022	MF	(Argentina) Gonzalo Escalante	28	(Spain) Alavés	Loan	Loan until the end of the season	
24 January 2022	DF	(Slovakia) Denis Vavro	25	(Denmark) Copenhagen	Loan	Loan until the end of the season with option to buy	
27 January 2022	DF	(Argentina) Tiago Casasola	26	(Italy) Cremonese	Loan	Loan until the end of the season	
29 January 2022	FW	(Netherlands) Bobby Adekanye	22	(Italy) Crotone	Loan	Loan until the end of the season	
30 January 2022	MF	(Spain) Jony	30	(Spain) Sporting Gijón	Loan	Loan until the end of the season 2022-2023	
31 January 2022	FW	(Italy) Cristiano Lombardi	26	(Italy) Reggina	Loan	Loan until the end of the season	
31 January 2022	FW	(Kosovo) Vedat Muriqi	27	(Spain) Mallorca	Loan (€1,000,000)	Loan until the end of the season with option to buy for €12,000,000	
8 April 2022	FW	(Italy) André Anderson	22	(Brazil) São Paulo	Loan	Loan until the end of the season 2022-2023	

== Pre-season and friendlies ==
Win Draw Loss

17 July 2021 Friendly	Lazio (Italy)	10–0	(Italy) Top 11 Radio Club	Auronzo di Cadore, Italy
18:30 CEST (UTC+2)	Felipe Anderson 15' (pen.); Moro 16'; Lucas 38'; Muriqi 43'; Lazzari 52'; Vavro 56'; Caicedo 63' (pen.), 84'; Luis Alberto 72', 90'	Report		Stadium: Stadio Rodolfo Zandegiacomo; Referee: Anna Frazza

20 July 2021 Friendly	Lazio (Italy)	11–0	(Italy) Fiori Barp Mas	Auronzo di Cadore, Italy
18:30 CEST (UTC+2)	Felipe Anderson 7'; Luis Alberto 18', 37', 45'; Caicedo 34', 42'; Hysaj 36'; Marušić 65'; Akpa Akpro 72'; Muriqi 77', 85'	Report		Stadium: Stadio Rodolfo Zandegiacomo; Referee: Michael Potot

23 July 2021 Friendly	Lazio (Italy)	5–2	(Italy) Triestina	Auronzo di Cadore, Italy
18:30 CEST (UTC+2)	Luis Alberto 3'; Muriqi 21'; Milinković-Savić 38'; Radu 44'; Volta 71' (o.g.)	Report	Di Massimo 89', 90+3'	Stadium: Stadio Rodolfo Zandegiacomo; Referee: Dario Duzel

27 July 2021 Friendly	Lazio (Italy)	1–1	(Italy) Padova	Auronzo di Cadore, Italy
18:30 CEST (UTC+2)	Luis Alberto (yellow card) 31', (goal) 43' (pen.)	Report	Della Latta 19'	Stadium: Stadio Rodolfo Zandegiacomo; Referee: Dario Duzel

4 August 2021 Friendly	Lazio (Italy)	1–1	(Germany) SV Meppen	Marienfeld, Germany
18:30 CEST (UTC+2)	Muriqi 19'	Report	Dombrowa 14'	Stadium: Hotel-Residence Klosterpforte; Referee: Florian Exner

7 August 2021 Friendly	FC Twente (Netherlands)	0–1	(Italy) Lazio	Enschede, Netherlands
19:30 CEST (UTC+2)		Report	Immobile 3'	Stadium: De Grolsch Veste; Referee: Bas Nijhuis

14 August 2021 Friendly	Lazio (Italy)	1–1	(Italy) Sassuolo	Frosinone, Italy
19:30 CEST (UTC+2)	Akpa Akpro 31'	Report	Traorè 45'	Stadium: Stadio Benito Stirpe; Referee: Matteo Marchetti

== Competitions ==
=== Overall record ===
Competition	First match	Last match	Starting round	Final position	Record							
Competition	First match	Last match	Starting round	Final position	Pld	W	D	L	GF	GA	GD	Win %
Serie A	21 August 2021	21 May 2022	Matchday 1	5th	38	18	10	10	77	58	+19	47.37
Coppa Italia	18 January 2022	9 February 2022	Round of 16	Quarter-finals	2	1	0	1	1	4	−3	50.00
Europa League	16 September 2021	24 February 2022	Group stage	Knockout round play-offs	8	2	3	3	10	7	+3	25.00
Total					48	21	13	14	88	69	+19	43.75

Source: Soccerway

=== Serie A ===
==== League table ====
Pos	Team	Pld	W	D	L	GF	GA	GD	Pts	Qualification or relegation
3	Napoli	38	24	7	7	74	31	+43	79	Qualification for the Champions League group stage
4	Juventus	38	20	10	8	57	37	+20	70	Qualification for the Champions League group stage
5	Lazio	38	18	10	10	77	58	+19	64	Qualification for the Europa League group stage (Note: Since the winners of the 2021–22 Coppa Italia, Inter Milan, qualified for the Champions League, the Europa League berth awarded to the Coppa Italia winners was passed to the sixth-placed team, and the Europa Conference League berth awarded to the sixth-placed team was passed to the seventh-placed team.)
6	Roma	38	18	9	11	59	43	+16	63	Qualification for the Europa League group stage
7	Fiorentina	38	19	5	14	59	51	+8	62	Qualification for the Conference League play-off round

Source: Serie A
Rules for classification: 1) Points; 2) Head-to-head points; 3) Head-to-head goal difference; 4) Goal difference; 5) Goals scored; 6) Draw. (Note: Head-to-head record is used only after all the matches between the teams in question have been played)

==== Results summary ====
Overall								Home						Away					
Pld	W	D	L	GF	GA	GD	Pts	W	D	L	GF	GA	GD	W	D	L	GF	GA	GD
38	18	10	10	77	58	+19	64	10	6	3	42	25	+17	8	4	7	35	33	+2

Source: Serie A

==== Results by round ====
Round	1	2	3	4	5	6	7	8	9	10	11	12	13	14	15	16	17	18	19	20	21	22	23	24	25	26	27	28	29	30	31	32	33	34	35	36	37	38
Ground	A	H	A	H	A	H	A	H	A	H	A	H	H	A	H	A	A	H	A	H	A	A	H	A	H	A	H	A	H	A	H	A	H	H	A	H	A	H
Result	W	W	L	D	D	W	L	W	L	W	D	W	L	L	D	W	L	W	W	D	L	W	D	W	W	D	L	W	W	L	W	W	D	L	W	W	D	D
Position	2	1	7	6	7	6	6	5	8	6	6	5	6	8	9	8	9	8	8	8	8	8	8	6	6	6	7	7	5	7	6	6	6	6	6	5	5	5

Source: Serie A
A = Away; H = Home; W = Win; D = Draw; L = Loss

==== Matches ====
The league fixtures were announced on 14 July 2021.

21 August 2021 1	Empoli	1–3	Lazio	Empoli
20:45 CEST (UTC+2)	Bandinelli 4'; Stojanović (yellow card) 38'; Ismajli (yellow card) 89'	Report	Milinković-Savić 6'; Lucas (yellow card) 29'; Lazzari 31'; Immobile 41' (pen.)	Stadium: Stadio Carlo Castellani; Attendance: 3,655; Referee: Simone Sozza

28 August 2021 2	Lazio	6–1	Spezia	Rome
18:30 CEST (UTC+2)	Immobile 5', 15', 45+2', (penalty missed) 45+1'; Felipe Anderson 47'; Hysaj 70'; Luis Alberto 85'	Report	Verde 4'; Erlić (yellow card) 45+1'; Gyasi (yellow card) 49'; Amian (red card) 54'	Stadium: Stadio Olimpico; Attendance: 22,000; Referee: Federico Dionisi

12 September 2021 3	Milan	2–0	Lazio	Milan
18:00 CEST (UTC+2)	Leão 45'; Kessié (penalty missed) 45+6'; Bakayoko (yellow card) 63'; Ibrahimović 67'	Report	Marušić (yellow card) 17'; Reina (yellow card) 45+5'; Luis Alberto (yellow card) 45+7'; Hysaj (yellow card) 57'	Stadium: San Siro; Attendance: 36,207; Referee: Daniele Chiffi

19 September 2021 4	Lazio	2–2	Cagliari	Rome
18:00 CEST (UTC+2)	Luiz Felipe (yellow card) 42'; Immobile 45'; Cataldi 83'	Report	Cáceres (yellow card) 6'; João Pedro 46'; Zappa (yellow card) 61' (yellow-red card) 90+4'; Keita 62'	Stadium: Stadio Olimpico; Attendance: 20,000; Referee: Davide Ghersini

23 September 2021 5	Torino	1–1	Lazio	Turin
18:30 CEST (UTC+2)	Mandragora (yellow card) 17'; Aina (yellow card) 31'; Brekalo (yellow card) 37'; Pjaca 76'	Report	Marušić (yellow card) 45+1'; Milinković-Savić (yellow card) 59'; Luiz Felipe (yellow card) 65'; Immobile 90+1' (pen.)	Stadium: Stadio Olimpico Grande Torino; Attendance: 8,646; Referee: Rosario Abisso

26 September 2021 6	Lazio	3–2	Roma	Rome
18:00 CEST (UTC+2)	Milinković-Savić 10'; Pedro 19'; Lucas (yellow card) 25'; Felipe Anderson 63'; Cataldi (yellow card) 87'	Report	Patrício (yellow card) 11'; Ibañez 41'; Cristante (yellow card) 45+2'; Viña (yellow card) 48'; Veretout 69' (pen.), (yellow card) 87'	Stadium: Stadio Olimpico; Attendance: 32,000; Referee: Marco Guida

3 October 2021 7	Bologna	3–0	Lazio	Bologna
12:30 CEST (UTC+2)	Barrow 14'; Theate 17'; Soumaoro (yellow card) 53'; Hickey 68'; De Silvestri (yellow card) 90+5'	Report	Milinković-Savić (yellow card) 52'; Pedro (yellow card) 66'; Lazzari (yellow card) 75'; Acerbi (yellow card) 76' (yellow-red card) 77'; Luiz Felipe (yellow card) 90+2'	Stadium: Stadio Renato Dall'Ara; Attendance: 12,975; Referee: Davide Massa

16 October 2021 8	Lazio	3–1	Internazionale	Rome
18:00 CEST (UTC+2)	Bašić (yellow card) 27'; Immobile 64' (pen.); Felipe Anderson 81', (yellow card) 83'; Milinković-Savić (yellow card) 83', (goal) 90+1'	Report	Perišić 12' (pen.); Gagliardini (yellow card) 36'; Bastoni (yellow card) 63'; Martínez (yellow card) 83'; Dumfries (yellow card) 83'; Correa (yellow card) 87'; Darmian (yellow card) 90+1'	Stadium: Stadio Olimpico; Attendance: 42,000; Referee: Massimiliano Irrati

24 October 2021 9	Hellas Verona	4–1	Lazio	Verona
15:00 CEST (UTC+2)	Veloso (yellow card) 9'; Simeone 30', 36', 62', 90+2'; Ceccherini (yellow card) 67'	Report	Patric (yellow card) 44'; Immobile 46'; Akpa Akpro (yellow card) 56'	Stadium: Stadio Marcantonio Bentegodi; Attendance: 13,953; Referee: Marco Piccinini

27 October 2021 10	Lazio	1–0	Fiorentina	Rome
20:45 CEST (UTC+2)	Pedro 52'; Cataldi (yellow card) 56'; Luis Alberto (yellow card) 79'	Report	Castrovilli (yellow card) 24'; Biraghi (yellow card) 47'; Duncan (yellow card) 68'	Stadium: Stadio Olimpico; Attendance: 13,000; Referee: Giovanni Ayroldi

30 October 2021 11	Atalanta	2–2	Lazio	Bergamo
15:00 CEST (UTC+2)	Zapata 45+1'; Demiral (yellow card) 78'; De Roon 90+4'	Report	Pedro 18'; Luiz Felipe (yellow card) 34'; Immobile 74'; Reina (yellow card) 90+2'; Lucas (yellow card) 90+3'	Stadium: Gewiss Stadium; Attendance: 11,981; Referee: Marco Guida

7 November 2021 12	Lazio	3–0	Salernitana	Rome
18:00 CET (UTC+1)	Cataldi (yellow card) 11'; Immobile 31'; Pedro 36'; Luis Alberto 69'	Report	Gyömbér (yellow card) 9'; Obi (yellow card) 55'	Stadium: Stadio Olimpico; Attendance: 25,000; Referee: Antonio Rapuano

20 November 2021 13	Lazio	0–2	Juventus	Rome
18:00 CET (UTC+1)	Hysaj (yellow card) 43'; Reina (yellow card) 81'; Luis Alberto (yellow card) 82'	Report	Bonucci 23' (pen.), 83' (pen.); Cuadrado (yellow card) 28'	Stadium: Stadio Olimpico; Attendance: 45,000; Referee: Marco Di Bello

28 November 2021 14	Napoli	4–0	Lazio	Naples
20:45 CET (UTC+1)	Zieliński 7'; Mertens 10', 29'; Di Lorenzo (yellow card) 78'; Fabián 85'; Demme (yellow card) 88'	Report	Luiz Felipe (yellow card) 13'; Patric (yellow card) 35'; Cataldi (yellow card) 59'; Zaccagni (yellow card) 79'	Stadium: Stadio San Paolo; Attendance: 36,000; Referee: Daniele Orsato

2 December 2021 15	Lazio	4–4	Udinese	Rome
20:45 CET (UTC+1)	Immobile 34', (yellow card) 40'; Patric (yellow card) 37' (yellow-red card) 57'; Pedro 51'; Milinković-Savić 56'; Acerbi 79'	Report	Beto 17', 32'; Becão (yellow card) 29'; Molina 44', (yellow card) 53' (yellow-red card) 69'; Udogie (yellow card) 90+8'; Soppy (yellow card) 90+9'; Arslan 90+9'; Walace (red card) 90+10'	Stadium: Stadio Olimpico; Attendance: 7,000; Referee: Marco Piccinini

5 December 2021 16	Sampdoria	1–3	Lazio	Genoa
18:00 CET (UTC+1)	Candreva (yellow card) 14'; Bereszyński (yellow card) 39'; Quagliarella (yellow card) 39'; Silva (yellow card) 80'; Gabbiadini 89'	Report	Milinković-Savić 7', (yellow card) 67' (yellow-red card) 67'; Immobile 17', 37'; Muriqi (yellow card) 88'	Stadium: Stadio Luigi Ferraris; Attendance: 5,883; Referee: Michael Fabbri

12 December 2021 17	Sassuolo	2–1	Lazio	Reggio Emilia
18:00 CET (UTC+1)	Berardi 63', (yellow card) 77'; Raspadori 69'; Ayhan (red card) 87'	Report	Zaccagni 6'; Marušić (yellow card) 39'; Anderson (yellow card) 73'	Stadium: Mapei Stadium – Città del Tricolore; Attendance: 5,346; Referee: Simone Sozza

17 December 2021 18	Lazio	3–1	Genoa	Rome
18:30 CET (UTC+1)	Pedro 36'; Acerbi 75'; Zaccagni 81'	Report	Ghiglione (yellow card) 30'; Vásquez (yellow card) 60'; Portanova (yellow card) 73'; Melegoni 86'	Stadium: Stadio Olimpico; Attendance: 6,000; Referee: Luca Pairetto

22 December 2021 19	Venezia	1–3	Lazio	Ferrara
16:30 CET (UTC+1)	Forte 30'; Črnigoj (yellow card) 55'; Ampadu (yellow card) 74'; Caldara (yellow card) 86'; Tessmann (red card) 90+1'	Report	Pedro 3', (yellow card) 54'; Luiz Felipe (yellow card) 45'; Acerbi 48'; Bašić (yellow card) 64'; Luis Alberto 90+5'	Stadium: Stadio Paolo Mazza; Attendance: 7,894; Referee: Fabio Maresca

6 January 2022 20	Lazio	3–3	Empoli	Rome
14:30 CET (UTC+1)	Immobile 14', (penalty missed) 87'; Luiz Felipe (yellow card) 18'; Pedro (yellow card) 52'; Marušić (yellow card) 62'; Milinković-Savić 66', 90+3'; Luis Alberto (yellow card) 71'	Report	Bajrami 6' (pen.); Żurkowski 8'; Parisi (yellow card) 10'; Marchizza (yellow card) 33'; Di Francesco 75'; Luperto (yellow card) 86'; Bandinelli (yellow card) 90+5'	Stadium: Stadio Olimpico; Attendance: 23,000; Referee: Antonio Giua

9 January 2022 21	Internazionale	2–1	Lazio	Milan
20:45 CET (UTC+1)	Bastoni 30'; Škriniar 67'; Vidal (yellow card) 90'	Report	Immobile 35'; Luiz Felipe (yellow card) 40'; Bašić (yellow card) 54'; Radu (yellow card) 71'; Zaccagni (yellow card) 71'	Stadium: San Siro; Attendance: 29,471; Referee: Luca Pairetto

15 January 2022 22	Salernitana	0–3	Lazio	Salerno
18:00 CET (UTC+1)	Schiavone (yellow card) 41'; Ranieri (yellow card) 63'	Report	Immobile 7', 10'; Cataldi (yellow card) 28'; Lazzari 66', (yellow card) 67'; Luiz Felipe (yellow card) 69'	Stadium: Stadio Arechi; Attendance: 2,559; Referee: Rosario Abisso

22 January 2022 23	Lazio	0–0	Atalanta	Rome
20:45 CET (UTC+1)		Report	Pezzella (yellow card) 33'; Zappacosta (yellow card) 39'; Tolói (yellow card) 85'	Stadium: Stadio Olimpico; Attendance: 4,000; Referee: Simone Sozza

5 February 2022 24	Fiorentina	0–3	Lazio	Florence
20:45 CET (UTC+1)	Bonaventura (yellow card) 50'; Torreira (yellow card) 55' (yellow-red card) 85'	Report	Lucas (yellow card) 30'; Pedro (yellow card) 45+1'; Milinković-Savić 52'; Lazzari (yellow card) 67'; Immobile 70'; Biraghi 81' (o.g.); Patric (yellow card) 83'; Strakosha (yellow card) 85'	Stadium: Stadio Artemio Franchi; Attendance: 17,181; Referee: Daniele Orsato

12 February 2022 25	Lazio	3–0	Bologna	Rome
15:00 CET (UTC+1)	Immobile 13' (pen.); Luis Alberto (yellow card) 40'; Zaccagni 53', 63'; Lucas (yellow card) 59'	Report	Svanberg (yellow card) 20'; Medel (yellow card) 45'	Stadium: Stadio Olimpico; Attendance: 22,000; Referee: Marco Piccinini

20 February 2022 26	Udinese	1–1	Lazio	Udine
20:45 CET (UTC+1)	Deulofeu 5'; Arslan (yellow card) 28'; Pérez (yellow card) 44'; Makengo (yellow card) 54'	Report	Felipe Anderson 45'; Cataldi (yellow card) 70'; Zaccagni (yellow card) 72'	Stadium: Stadio Friuli; Attendance: 10,799; Referee: Luca Massimi

27 February 2022 27	Lazio	1–2	Napoli	Rome
20:50 CET (UTC+1)	Radu (yellow card) 71'; Immobile (yellow card) 79'; Zaccagni (yellow card) 82'; Pedro 88'	Report	Insigne 62'; Mário Rui (yellow card) 90+3'; Fabián 90+4', (yellow card) 90+7'	Stadium: Stadio Olimpico; Attendance: 25,000; Referee: Marco Di Bello

5 March 2022 28	Cagliari	0–3	Lazio	Cagliari
20:45 CET (UTC+1)	Altare (yellow card) 18'; Marin (yellow card) 74'; Lovato (yellow card) 90+2'	Report	Immobile 19' (pen.); Luis Alberto 42'; Felipe Anderson 62'; Marušić (yellow card) 71' (yellow-red card) 89'	Stadium: Unipol Domus; Attendance: 10,873; Referee: Fabio Maresca

14 March 2022 29	Lazio	1–0	Venezia	Rome
20:45 CET (UTC+1)	Zaccagni (yellow card) 42'; Immobile 58' (pen.)	Report	Matějů (yellow card) 29'	Stadium: Stadio Olimpico; Attendance: 18,000; Referee: Gianluca Manganiello

20 March 2022 30	Roma	3–0	Lazio	Rome
18:00 CET (UTC+1)	Abraham 1', 22'; Pellegrini 40'; Karsdorp (yellow card) 48'; Mancini (yellow card) 53'; Zalewski (yellow card) 73'; Oliveira (yellow card) 78'	Report	Pedro (yellow card) 43'; Patric (yellow card) 43'; Lucas (yellow card) 61'	Stadium: Stadio Olimpico; Attendance: 51,932; Referee: Massimiliano Irrati

2 April 2022 31	Lazio	2–1	Sassuolo	Rome
18:00 CEST (UTC+2)	Felipe Anderson (yellow card) 7'; Lazzari 17'; Milinković-Savić 51'	Report	Kyriakopoulos (yellow card) 5'; Frattesi (yellow card) 32'; Harroui (yellow card) 84'; Traorè 90+5'	Stadium: Stadio Olimpico; Attendance: 15,000; Referee: Antonio Rapuano

10 April 2022 32	Genoa	1–4	Lazio	Genoa
12:30 CEST (UTC+2)	Patric 68' (o.g.)	Report	Marušić 31'; Lucas (yellow card) 37'; Immobile 45+1', 63', 76'	Stadium: Stadio Luigi Ferraris; Attendance: 16,756; Referee: Gianluca Manganiello

16 April 2022 33	Lazio	1–1	Torino	Rome
20:45 CEST (UTC+2)	Immobile (yellow card) 90+1', (goal) 90+3'	Report	Pellegri (yellow card) 53', (goal) 56'; Lukić (yellow card) 90+1'	Stadium: Stadio Olimpico; Attendance: 25,000; Referee: Alessandro Prontera

24 April 2022 34	Lazio	1–2	Milan	Rome
20:45 CEST (UTC+2)	Immobile 4'; Strakosha (yellow card) 8'; Lucas (yellow card) 53'; Cataldi (yellow card) 74'	Report	Tomori (yellow card) 26'; Giroud 50'; Kalulu (yellow card) 83'; Ibrahimović (yellow card) 85'; Tonali 90+3', (yellow card) 90+4'	Stadium: Stadio Olimpico; Attendance: 26,500; Referee: Marco Guida

30 April 2022 35	Spezia	3–4	Lazio	La Spezia
20:45 CEST (UTC+2)	Amian 9', (yellow card) 64'; Agudelo 35'; Hristov 56'; Manaj (yellow card) 64'; Kovalenko (yellow card) 90+2'	Report	Immobile 33' (pen.); Zaccagni (yellow card) 37'; Provedel 54' (o.g.); Milinković-Savić 68'; Acerbi 90'	Stadium: Stadio Alberto Picco; Attendance: 8,750; Referee: Luca Pairetto

7 May 2022 36	Lazio	2–0	Sampdoria	Rome
20:45 CEST (UTC+2)	Patric 41'; Luis Alberto 59'; Hysaj (yellow card) 82'	Report	Vieira (yellow card) 79'	Stadium: Stadio Olimpico; Attendance: 33,000; Referee: Davide Massa

16 May 2022 37	Juventus	2–2	Lazio	Turin
20:45 CEST (UTC+2)	Vlahović 10'; Morata 36'; Bernardeschi (yellow card) 45+1'; Cuadrado (yellow card) 68'; Aké (yellow card) 80'	Report	Acerbi (yellow card) 41'; Alex Sandro 51' (o.g.); Milinković-Savić (yellow card) 83', (goal) 90+6'; Patric (yellow card) 90'	Stadium: Juventus Stadium; Attendance: 40,515; Referee: Giovanni Ayroldi

21 May 2022 38	Lazio	3–3	Hellas Verona	Rome
20:45 CEST (UTC+2)	Cabral 16'; Luiz Felipe (yellow card) 20'; Felipe Anderson 29'; Pedro 62'; Lucas (yellow card) 85'	Report	Hongla (yellow card) 3', (goal) 76'; Simeone 6'; Lasagna 14', (yellow card) 90+3'; Veloso (yellow card) 23'; Ceccherini (yellow card) 44'; Faraoni (yellow card) 45+4'; Casale (yellow card) 53'	Stadium: Stadio Olimpico; Attendance: 55,098; Referee: Andrea Colombo

=== Coppa Italia ===
18 January 2022 Round of 16	Lazio	1–0 (a.e.t.)	Udinese	Rome
17:30 CET (UTC+1)	Luiz Felipe (yellow card) 52'; Patric (yellow card) 63'; Cataldi (yellow card) 78'; Felipe Anderson (yellow card) 97'; Immobile 106'; Hysaj (yellow card) 110'; Moro (yellow card) 118'	Report	Becão (yellow card) 10'; Zeegelaar (yellow card) 42'; Pussetto (yellow card) 48'; Pérez (yellow card) 101'; Soppy (yellow card) 110'; Arslan (yellow card) 117'	Stadium: Stadio Olimpico; Referee: Daniele Minelli

9 February 2022 Quarter-finals	Milan	4–0	Lazio	Milan
21:00 CET (UTC+1)	Tonali (yellow card) 22'; Leão 24'; Giroud 41', 45+1'; Kessié 79'	Report	Luiz Felipe (yellow card) 15'	Stadium: San Siro; Attendance: 26,947; Referee: Simone Sozza

=== UEFA Europa League ===
==== Group stage ====
The draw for the group stage was held on 27 August 2021.

Pos	Team	Pld	W	D	L	GF	GA	GD	Pts	Qualification	GAL	LAZ	MAR	LOK
1	(Turkey) Galatasaray	6	3	3	0	7	3	+4	12	Advance to round of 16	—	1–0	4–2	1–1
2	(Italy) Lazio	6	2	3	1	7	3	+4	9	Advance to knockout round play-offs	0–0	—	0–0	2–0
3	(France) Marseille	6	1	4	1	6	7	−1	7	Transfer to Europa Conference League	0–0	2–2	—	1–0
4	(Russia) Lokomotiv Moscow	6	0	2	4	2	9	−7	2		0–1	0–3	1–1	—

Source: UEFA
Rules for classification: Group stage tiebreakers

16 September 2021 1	Galatasaray (Turkey)	1–0	(Italy) Lazio	Istanbul, Turkey
19:45 TRT (UTC+2)	Muslera (yellow card) 8'; Strakosha 67' (o.g.)	Report	Akpa Akpro (yellow card) 43'; Muriqi (yellow card) 88'; Zaccagni (yellow card) 90+4'	Stadium: Türk Telekom Stadium; Attendance: 15,353; Referee: Matej Jug (Slovenia)

30 September 2021 2	Lazio (Italy)	2–0	(Russia) Lokomotiv Moscow	Rome, Italy
21:00 CEST (UTC+2)	Bašić 13'; Patric 38'; Cataldi (yellow card) 45+2'; Lazzari (yellow card) 67'	Report	Beka Beka (yellow card) 47'; Rybchinsky (yellow card) 90+1'	Stadium: Stadio Olimpico; Attendance: 6,767; Referee: Craig Pawson (England)

21 October 2021 3	Lazio (Italy)	0–0	(France) Marseille	Rome, Italy
18:45 CEST (UTC+2)		Report	Payet (yellow card) 52'; Kamara (yellow card) 73'; Rongier (yellow card) 81'	Stadium: Stadio Olimpico; Attendance: 8,329; Referee: Deniz Aytekin (Germany)

4 November 2021 4	Marseille (France)	2–2	(Italy) Lazio	Marseille, France
21:00 CET (UTC+1)	Milik 33' (pen.); Rongier (yellow card) 79'; Payet 82', (yellow card) 90+4'; Harit (yellow card) 86'	Report	Acerbi (yellow card) 32'; Pedro (yellow card) 36'; Immobile (yellow card) 44', (goal) 49'; Felipe Anderson 45+7', (yellow card) 70'	Stadium: Stade Vélodrome; Attendance: 59,163; Referee: José María Sánchez Martínez (Spain)

25 November 2021 5	Lokomotiv Moscow (Russia)	0–3	(Italy) Lazio	Moscow, Russia
20:45 MSK (UTC+3)	Kamano (yellow card) 1'; Nenakhov (yellow card) 14'; Silyanov (yellow card) 55'; Barinov (yellow card) 62'; Rybus (yellow card) 86'	Report	Zaccagni (yellow card) 21'; Luis Alberto (yellow card) 36'; Immobile 56' (pen.), 63' (pen.); Lucas (yellow card) 57'; Milinković-Savić (yellow card) 76'; Pedro 87'	Stadium: RZD Arena; Attendance: 8,100; Referee: Artur Soares Dias (Portugal)

9 December 2021 3	Lazio (Italy)	0–0	(Turkey) Galatasaray	Rome, Italy
21:00 CEST (UTC+1)	Luiz Felipe (yellow card) 11'	Report	Aktürkoğlu (yellow card) 17'; Bayram (yellow card) 77'; Kılınç (yellow card) 84'	Stadium: Stadio Olimpico; Attendance: 13,178; Referee: Carlos del Cerro Grande (Spain)

==== Knockout phase ====
===== Knockout round play-offs =====
The knockout round play-offs draw was held on 13 December 2021.

17 February 2022 First leg	Porto (Portugal)	2–1	(Italy) Lazio	Porto, Portugal
21:00 CET (UTC+1)	Grujić (yellow card) 4'; Martínez 37', 49'; Vieira (yellow card) 45+1'; Galeno (yellow card) 72'; Evanilson (yellow card) 73'	Report	Zaccagni 23', (yellow card) 78'; Milinković-Savić (yellow card) 39'	Stadium: Estádio do Dragão; Attendance: 32,929; Referee: Serdar Gözübüyük (Netherlands)

24 February 2022 Second leg	Lazio (Italy)	2–2 (3–4 agg.)	(Portugal) Porto	Rome, Italy
18:45 CET (UTC+1)	Radu (yellow card) 4'; Immobile 19'; Patric (yellow card) 77'; Luis Alberto (yellow card) 78'; Cataldi 90+5'	Report	Taremi 31' (pen.); Sanusi (yellow card) 45+2'; Uribe 68'; Otávio (yellow card) 79'	Stadium: Stadio Olimpico; Attendance: 24,948; Referee: Deniz Aytekin (Germany)

== Statistics ==
=== Appearances and goals ===
No.	Pos	Nat	Player	Total		Serie A		Coppa Italia		Europa League	
No.	Pos	Nat	Player	Apps	Goals	Apps	Goals	Apps	Goals	Apps	Goals
Goalkeepers
1	GK	(Albania) ALB	Thomas Strakosha	31	0	23	0	0	0	8	0
25	GK	(Spain) ESP	Pepe Reina	17	0	15	0	2	0	0	0
31	GK	(Lithuania) LTU	Marius Adamonis	0	0	0	0	0	0	0	0
Defenders
3	DF	(Brazil) BRA	Luiz Felipe	40	0	28+3	0	2	0	7	0
4	DF	(Spain) ESP	Patric	30	2	19+5	1	2	0	4	1
16	DF	(Serbia) SRB	Dimitrije Kamenović	1	0	0+1	0	0	0	0	0
23	DF	(Albania) ALB	Elseid Hysaj	38	1	24+5	1	1+1	0	5+2	0
26	DF	(Romania) ROU	Ștefan Radu	12	0	6+4	0	0	0	2	0
33	DF	(Italy) ITA	Francesco Acerbi	36	4	29+1	4	0	0	6	0
77	DF	(Montenegro) MNE	Adam Marušić	41	1	30+3	1	2	0	4+2	0
Midfielders
6	MF	(Brazil) BRA	Lucas Leiva	45	0	19+16	0	1+1	0	6+2	0
8	MF	(Ivory Coast) CIV	Jean-Daniel Akpa Akpro	13	0	4+6	0	0	0	1+2	0
10	MF	(Spain) ESP	Luis Alberto	44	5	27+7	5	1+1	0	6+2	0
20	MF	(Italy) ITA	Mattia Zaccagni	36	5	21+8	4	2	0	5	1
21	MF	(Serbia) SRB	Sergej Milinković-Savić	47	11	36+1	11	2	0	4+4	0
28	MF	(Italy) ITA	André Anderson	4	0	0+4	0	0	0	0	0
29	MF	(Italy) ITA	Manuel Lazzari	38	3	16+15	3	1	0	4+2	0
32	MF	(Italy) ITA	Danilo Cataldi	42	2	19+13	1	1+1	0	2+6	1
88	MF	(Croatia) CRO	Toma Bašić	37	1	9+20	0	1	0	5+2	1
Forwards
7	MF	(Brazil) BRA	Felipe Anderson	48	7	33+5	6	2	0	7+1	1
9	FW	(Spain) ESP	Pedro	41	10	25+7	9	0+1	0	5+3	1
11	FW	(Cape Verde) CPV	Jovane Cabral	4	1	2+1	1	0	0	0+1	0
17	FW	(Italy) ITA	Ciro Immobile	40	32	31	27	1+1	1	7	4
18	FW	(Argentina) ARG	Luka Romero	9	0	0+8	0	0+1	0	0	0
27	FW	(Spain) ESP	Raúl Moro	18	0	1+10	0	0+2	0	0+5	0
Players transferred out during the season
5	MF	(Argentina) ARG	Gonzalo Escalante	1	0	0+1	0	0	0	0	0
19	DF	(Slovakia) SVK	Denis Vavro	2	0	0+1	0	0+1	0	0	0
94	FW	(Kosovo) KOS	Vedat Muriqi	15	0	1+10	0	1	0	0+3	0

Last updated: 21 May 2022
Source: Competitions

=== Goalscorers ===
As of 18 January 2022

Rank	Player	Serie A	Coppa Italia	Europa League	Total
1	(Italy) Ciro Immobile	27	1	4	32
2	(Spain) Pedro	7	0	1	8
3	(Serbia) Sergej Milinković-Savić	7	0	0	7
4	(Brazil) Felipe Anderson	3	0	1	4
5	(Spain) Luis Alberto	3	0	0	3
Own goals		0	0	0	0
Total		46	1	7	54
