= 2021–22 US Salernitana 1919 season =

Salernitana
2021–22 season
- CEO: Danilo Iervolino
- Manager: Fabrizio Castori (until 17 October); Stefano Colantuono (from 17 October to 15 February); Davide Nicola (from 15 February)
- Stadium: Stadio Arechi
- Serie A: 17th
- Coppa Italia: Second round
- Top goalscorer: League: Federico Bonazzoli (10); All: Federico Bonazzoli (12)
Home colours	Away colours	Third colours

The 2021–22 season was the 103rd season in the existence of U.S. Salernitana 1919 and the club's first season return in the top flight of Italian football since 1999. In addition to the domestic league, Salernitana participated in this season's edition of the Coppa Italia.

== Players ==
=== First-team squad ===
As of 18 February 2022

Note: Flags indicate national team as defined under FIFA eligibility rules; some limited exceptions apply. Players may hold more than one non-FIFA nationality.

No.	Pos.	Nation	Player
1	GK	ITA	Vincenzo Fiorillo
2	MF	SEN	Mamadou Coulibaly (on loan from Udinese)
3	DF	ITA	Matteo Ruggeri (on loan from Atalanta)
4	DF	POL	Paweł Jaroszyński (on loan from Genoa)
5	DF	ALB	Frédéric Veseli
6	DF	NOR	Stefan Strandberg
7	MF	FRA	Franck Ribéry (captain)
8	MF	ITA	Andrea Schiavone
9	FW	ITA	Federico Bonazzoli (on loan from Sampdoria)
10	FW	ITA	Simone Verdi (on loan from Torino)
11	FW	BIH	Milan Đurić
12	GK	ITA	Antonio Russo
13	MF	BRA	Éderson
14	MF	ITA	Francesco Di Tacchio (vice-captain)
15	MF	NOR	Emil Bohinen (on loan from CSKA Moscow)
16	MF	SRB	Ivan Radovanović
17	DF	ARG	Federico Fazio
18	MF	MLI	Lassana Coulibaly

No.	Pos.	Nation	Player
19	DF	ITA	Luca Ranieri (on loan from Fiorentina)
20	MF	CYP	Grigoris Kastanos (on loan from Juventus)
21	DF	ITA	Nadir Zortea (on loan from Atalanta)
22	MF	NGR	Joel Obi
23	DF	SVK	Norbert Gyömbér
24	DF	TUN	Wajdi Kechrida
25	DF	ROU	Radu Drăgușin (on loan from Juventus)
28	MF	ITA	Leonardo Capezzi
30	MF	ITA	Pasquale Mazzocchi (on loan from Venezia)
31	DF	SWE	Riccardo Gagliolo
33	DF	ITA	Filippo Delli Carri (on loan from Juventus)
55	GK	ITA	Luigi Sepe (on loan from Parma)
63	FW	ITA	Edoardo Vergani
72	GK	SLO	Vid Belec
87	FW	BRA	Mikael (on loan from Sport Recife)
88	FW	ARG	Diego Perotti
99	FW	FRA	Lys Mousset (on loan from Sheffield United)

=== Out on loan ===
As of 2 February 2022

Note: Flags indicate national team as defined under FIFA eligibility rules; some limited exceptions apply. Players may hold more than one non-FIFA nationality.

No.	Pos.	Nation	Player
—	GK	ITA	Alessandro Micai (at Reggina until 30 June 2022)
—	DF	CRO	Luka Bogdan (at Ternana until 30 June 2022)
—	DF	ITA	Valerio Mantovani (at Alessandria until 30 June 2022)
—	DF	ITA	Mirko Esposito (at Mantova until 30 June 2022)
—	DF	ITA	Gioacchino Galeotafiore (at Seregno until 30 June 2022)
—	DF	FRA	Sanasi Sy (at Cosenza until 30 June 2022)
—	MF	NED	Reda Boultam (at Cosenza until 30 June 2022)
—	MF	ESP	Kaleb Jimenez Castillo (at Seregno until 30 June 2022)
—	MF	ITA	Michele Cavion (at Vicenza until 30 June 2022)

No.	Pos.	Nation	Player
—	MF	ITA	Agostino Del Regno (at Paganese until 30 June 2022)
—	MF	ITA	Carmine Iannone (at Paganese until 30 June 2022)
—	MF	ITA	Edoardo Iannoni (at Ancona-Matelica until 30 June 2022)
—	MF	ITA	Francesco Orlando (at Alessandria until 30 June 2022)
—	MF	ITA	Gaetano Vitale (at Seregno until 30 June 2022)
—	FW	ITA	Filippo D'Andrea (at Teramo until 30 June 2022)
—	FW	ITA	Giuseppe Fella (at Palermo until 30 June 2022)
—	FW	NOR	Julian Kristoffersen (at Cosenza until 30 June 2022)
—	FW	NGR	Simy (at Parma until 30 June 2022)

== Pre-season and friendlies ==
Win Draw Loss Fixtures

29 July 2021 Friendly	Salernitana (Italy)	1–0	(Italy) Fermana	Cascia, Italy
17:30 CEST (UTC+2)				Stadium: Campo Sportivo di Cascia

1 August 2021 Friendly	Palermo (Italy)	1–2	(Italy) Salernitana	San Gregorio Magno, Italy
17:30 CEST (UTC+2)	Silipo 75' (pen.)			Stadium: Stadio comunale San Gregorio

8 August 2021 Friendly	Aston Villa (England)	3–1	(Italy) Salernitana	Birmingham, England
14:00 BST (UTC+1)	Ings 34'; El Ghazi 43' (pen.); Young 71'		Obi 20'	Stadium: Villa Park; Attendance: 0 Referee: Craig Pawson

== Competitions ==
=== Overall record ===
Competition	First match	Last match	Starting round	Final position	Record							
Competition	First match	Last match	Starting round	Final position	Pld	W	D	L	GF	GA	GD	Win %
Serie A	22 August 2021	22 May 2022	Matchday 1	17th	38	7	10	21	33	78	−45	18.42
Coppa Italia	16 August 2021	14 December 2021	First round	Second round	2	1	0	1	2	1	+1	50.00
Total					40	8	10	22	35	79	−44	20.00

Source: Soccerway

=== Serie A ===
==== League table ====
Pos	Team	Pld	W	D	L	GF	GA	GD	Pts	Qualification or relegation
15	Sampdoria	38	10	6	22	46	63	−17	36	
16	Spezia	38	10	6	22	41	71	−30	36	
17	Salernitana	38	7	10	21	33	78	−45	31	
18	Cagliari (R)	38	6	12	20	34	68	−34	30	Relegation to Serie B
19	Genoa (R)	38	4	16	18	27	60	−33	28	Relegation to Serie B

Source: Serie A
Rules for classification: 1) Points; 2) Head-to-head points; 3) Head-to-head goal difference; 4) Goal difference; 5) Goals scored; 6) Draw. (Note: Head-to-head record is used only after all the matches between the teams in question have been played)
(R) Relegated

==== Results summary ====
Overall								Home						Away					
Pld	W	D	L	GF	GA	GD	Pts	W	D	L	GF	GA	GD	W	D	L	GF	GA	GD
38	7	10	21	33	78	−45	31	3	6	10	17	39	−22	4	4	11	16	39	−23

Source: Serie A

==== Results by round ====
Round	1	2	3	4	5	6	7	8	9	10	11	12	13	14	15	16	17	18	19	20	21	22	23	24	25	26	27	28	29	30	31	32	33	34	35	36	37	38
Ground	A	H	A	H	H	A	H	A	H	A	H	A	H	A	H	A	A	H	A	H	A	H	A	H	A	H	H	A	H	A	H	A	A	H	A	H	A	H
Result	L	L	L	L	D	L	W	L	L	W	L	L	L	D	L	L	L	L	W	W	W	L	L	D	D	D	D	L	D	L	L	L	W	W	D	D	D	L
Position	14	18	20	20	20	20	18	20	20	19	19	19	20	20	20	20	20	20	20	20	20	20	20	20	20	20	20	20	20	20	20	20	19	19	17	17	17	17

Source: Serie A
A = Away; H = Home; W = Win; D = Draw; L = Loss

==== Matches ====
The league fixtures were announced on 14 July 2021.

22 August 2021 1	Bologna	3–2	Salernitana	Bologna
18:30 CEST (UTC+2)	Soriano (yellow card) 41' (yellow-red card) 50'; Schouten (yellow card) 55' (yellow-red card) 88'; De Silvestri 59', 77'; Arnautović 75'; Bonifazi (yellow card) 87'; Sansone (yellow card) 90+1'	Report	Strandberg (yellow card) 33' (yellow-red card) 34'; Bonazzoli 52' (pen.); Coulibaly 70'; Jaroszyński (yellow card) 79'	Stadium: Stadio Renato Dall'Ara; Attendance: 8,375; Referee: Antonio Rapuano

29 August 2021 2	Salernitana	0–4	Roma	Salerno
20:45 CEST (UTC+2)	Bonazzoli (yellow card) 35'; Aya (yellow card) 50'	Report	Pérez (yellow card) 40'; Pellegrini 48', 79'; Veretout 52'; Mkhitaryan (yellow card) 67'; Abraham 69'	Stadium: Stadio Arechi; Attendance: 13,000; Referee: Rosario Abisso

12 September 2021 3	Torino	4–0	Salernitana	Turin
15:00 CEST (UTC+2)	Sanabria 45'; Bremer 65'; Pobega 87'; Lukić 90+1'	Report	Bonazzoli (yellow card) 42'; Gyömbér (yellow card) 63'	Stadium: Stadio Olimpico Grande Torino; Attendance: 9,082; Referee: Gianluca Aureliano

18 September 2021 4	Salernitana	0–1	Atalanta	Salerno
20:45 CEST (UTC+2)	Đurić (yellow card) 45'; Ranieri (yellow card) 60'; Obi (yellow card) 73'; Jaroszyński (yellow card) 86'	Report	Mæhle (yellow card) 16'; Tolói (yellow card) 38'; Demiral (yellow card) 45'; Malinovskyi (yellow card) 56'; Zapata 75'	Stadium: Stadio Arechi; Attendance: 10,881; Referee: Paolo Valeri

22 September 2021 5	Salernitana	2–2	Hellas Verona	Salerno
18:30 CEST (UTC+2)	Gondo 45+2'; M. Coulibaly 76'; Gagliolo (yellow card) 84'; L. Coulibaly (yellow card) 86'	Report	Kalinić 7', 29', (yellow card) 36'; Magnani (yellow card) 41'; Dawidowicz (yellow card) 90'	Stadium: Stadio Arechi; Attendance: 9,561; Referee: Massimiliano Irrati

26 September 2021 6	Sassuolo	1–0	Salernitana	Reggio Emilia
15:00 CEST (UTC+2)	Lopez (yellow card) 15'; Ferrari (yellow card) 31'; Berardi 54'; Scamacca (yellow card) 87'	Report	Ranieri (yellow card) 30'; Gondo (yellow card) 36'; Bonazzoli (yellow card) 89'	Stadium: Mapei Stadium – Città del Tricolore; Attendance: 5,177; Referee: Antonio Giua

2 October 2021 7	Salernitana	1–0	Genoa	Salerno
15:00 CEST (UTC+2)	Đurić 66'; Gyömbér (yellow card) 89'; Ribéry (yellow card) 90+1'	Report	Maksimović (yellow card) 75'; Cambiaso (yellow card) 84'	Stadium: Stadio Arechi; Attendance: 10,077; Referee: Maurizio Mariani

16 October 2021 8	Spezia	2–1	Salernitana	La Spezia
15:00 CEST (UTC+2)	Strelec 51'; Gyasi (yellow card) 62'; Kovalenko 76'; Manaj (yellow card) 90'	Report	Simy 39'; Obi (yellow card) 53'; Coulibaly (yellow card) 60'; Ranieri (yellow card) 80'	Stadium: Stadio Alberto Picco; Attendance: 6,023; Referee: Davide Massa

23 October 2021 9	Salernitana	2–4	Empoli	Salerno
15:00 CEST (UTC+2)	Ranieri 48', (yellow card) 76'; Ismajli 55' (o.g.)	Report	Pinamonti 2', 45' (pen.); Cutrone 11'; Strandberg 13' (o.g.); Stojanović (yellow card) 33'; Haas (yellow card) 53'; Marchizza (yellow card) 86'	Stadium: Stadio Arechi; Attendance: 11,142; Referee: Daniele Doveri

26 October 2021 10	Venezia	1–2	Salernitana	Ferrara
18:30 CEST (UTC+2)	Busio (yellow card) 10'; Aramu 14'; Mazzocchi (yellow card) 59'; Ampadu (yellow card) 60', (red card) 67'	Report	Bonazzoli (yellow card) 45+1', (goal) 61'; Di Tacchio (yellow card) 80'; Zortea (yellow card) 90+3'; Schiavone 90+5'	Stadium: Stadio Paolo Mazza; Attendance: 5,209; Referee: Marco Di Bello

31 October 2021 11	Salernitana	0–1	Napoli	Salerno
18:00 CET (UTC+1)	Kastanos (red card) 70'	Report	Zambo Anguissa (yellow card) 41'; Zieliński 61'; Mário Rui (yellow card) 74'; Koulibaly (red card) 77'	Stadium: Stadio Arechi; Attendance: 17,043; Referee: Michael Fabbri

7 November 2021 12	Lazio	3–0	Salernitana	Rome
18:00 CET (UTC+1)	Cataldi (yellow card) 11'; Immobile 31'; Pedro 36'; Luis Alberto 69'	Report	Gyömbér (yellow card) 9'; Obi (yellow card) 55'	Stadium: Stadio Olimpico; Attendance: 25,000; Referee: Antonio Rapuano

21 November 2021 13	Salernitana	0–2	Sampdoria	Salerno
15:00 CET (UTC+1)		Report	Bereszyński (yellow card) 24'; Di Tacchio 40' (o.g.); Candreva 43'; Ekdal (yellow card) 57'; Chabot (yellow card) 86'	Stadium: Stadio Arechi; Attendance: 11,849; Referee: Piero Giacomelli

26 November 2021 14	Cagliari	1–1	Salernitana	Cagliari
20:45 CET (UTC+1)	Grassi (yellow card) 27'; Dalbert (yellow card) 30'; Pavoletti 73', (yellow card) 79'	Report	Veseli (yellow card) 84'; Bonazzoli 90'	Stadium: Sardegna Arena; Attendance: 9,700; Referee: Daniele Doveri

30 November 2021 15	Salernitana	0–2	Juventus	Salerno
20:45 CET (UTC+1)	Gagliolo (yellow card) 25'	Report	Dybala 21', (penalty missed) 90+5'; Locatelli (yellow card) 60'; Morata 70'	Stadium: Stadio Arechi; Attendance: 19,500; Referee: Francesco Fourneau

4 December 2021 16	Milan	2–0	Salernitana	Milan
15:00 CET (UTC+1)	Kessié 5'; Saelemaekers 18'; Bakayoko (yellow card) 24'	Report	Di Tacchio (yellow card) 30'; Đurić (yellow card) 86'	Stadium: San Siro; Attendance: 43,609; Referee: Antonio Giua

11 December 2021 17	Fiorentina	4–0	Salernitana	Florence
15:00 CET (UTC+1)	Milenković (yellow card) 11'; Bonaventura 31'; Vlahović 51', 84'; Maleh 90'	Report	Kastanos (yellow card) 20'	Stadium: Stadio Artemio Franchi; Attendance: 18,579; Referee: Davide Ghersini

17 December 2021 18	Salernitana	0–5	Internazionale	Salerno
20:45 CET (UTC+1)	Gyömbér (yellow card) 53'	Report	Perišić 11'; Barella (yellow card) 16'; Dumfries 33'; Sánchez 52'; Çalhanoğlu (yellow card) 76'; Martínez 77'; Gagliardini 87'	Stadium: Stadio Arechi; Attendance: 18,000; Referee: Maurizio Mariani

9 January 2022 21	Hellas Verona	1–2	Salernitana	Verona
20:45 CET (UTC+1)	Lazović 63'; Ilić (red card) 89'; Günter (yellow card) 90+2'	Report	Đurić 29' (pen.); Kastanos (yellow card) 31', (goal) 70'; Gyömbér (yellow card) 36'; Di Tacchio (yellow card) 89'	Stadium: Stadio Marcantonio Bentegodi; Attendance: 3,106; Referee: Federico Dionisi

15 January 2022 22	Salernitana	0–3	Lazio	Salerno
18:00 CET (UTC+1)	Schiavone (yellow card) 41'; Ranieri (yellow card) 63'	Report	Immobile 7', 10'; Cataldi (yellow card) 28'; Lazzari 66', (yellow card) 67'; Luiz Felipe (yellow card) 69'	Stadium: Stadio Arechi; Attendance: 2,559; Referee: Rosario Abisso

23 January 2022 23	Napoli	4–1	Salernitana	Naples
15:00 CET (UTC+1)	Juan Jesus 17'; Mertens 45+4' (pen.); Rrahmani 47'; Insigne 53' (pen.)	Report	Delli Carri (yellow card) 23'; Obi (yellow card) 30'; Bonazzoli 33'; Veseli (yellow card) 45+3' (yellow-red card) 51'	Stadium: Stadio Diego Armando Maradona; Attendance: 3,000; Referee: Luca Pairetto

7 February 2022 24	Salernitana	2–2	Spezia	Salerno
20:45 CET (UTC+1)	Verdi 3', 16'; Mousset (yellow card) 30'; Fazio (yellow card) 53'; Radovanović (yellow card) 90+1'	Report	Manaj 12' (pen.); Amian (yellow card) 15'; Verde 30' (pen.); Kiwior (yellow card) 88'; Nguiamba (yellow card) 90+4'	Stadium: Stadio Arechi; Attendance: 10,668; Referee: Paolo Valeri

13 February 2022 25	Genoa	1–1	Salernitana	Genoa
15:00 CET (UTC+1)	Destro 32'; Sturaro (yellow card) 53'; Badelj (yellow card) 61'; Rovella (yellow card) 66'	Report	Bonazzoli 45+1'; Mazzocchi (yellow card) 63'; Drăgușin (yellow card) 75'	Stadium: Stadio Luigi Ferraris; Attendance: 13,742; Referee: Marco Di Bello

19 February 2022 26	Salernitana	2–2	Milan	Salerno
20:45 CET (UTC+1)	Bonazzoli 29'; Éderson (yellow card) 52'; Đurić 72', (yellow card) 72'	Report	Messias 5'; Bennacer (yellow card) 35'; Giroud (yellow card) 60'; Rebić (yellow card) 70', (goal) 77'; Romagnoli (yellow card) 83'	Stadium: Stadio Arechi; Attendance: 18,449; Referee: Michael Fabbri

26 February 2022 27	Salernitana	1–1	Bologna	Salerno
15:05 CET (UTC+1)	Ranieri (yellow card) 7'; Coulibaly (yellow card) 70'; Zortea 72'	Report	Arnautović 43', (yellow card) 79'; Soriano (yellow card) 59'; De Silvestri (yellow card) 82'	Stadium: Stadio Arechi; Attendance: 13,289; Referee: Giovanni Ayroldi

4 March 2022 28	Internazionale	5–0	Salernitana	Milan
20:45 CET (UTC+1)	Darmian (yellow card) 8'; Martínez 22', 40', 56'; De Vrij (yellow card) 44'; Džeko 64', 69'	Report	Mousset (yellow card) 12'	Stadium: San Siro; Attendance: 46,287; Referee: Livio Marinelli

12 March 2022 29	Salernitana	2–2	Sassuolo	Salerno
15:00 CET (UTC+1)	Bonazzoli 8'; Ruggeri (yellow card) 62'; Ranieri (yellow card) 80'; Đurić 82'	Report	Berardi (yellow card) 13'; Scamacca 20'; Traorè 30'; Raspadori (yellow card) 57' (yellow-red card) 59'; Lopez (yellow card) 90'	Stadium: Stadio Arechi; Attendance: 10,249; Referee: Luca Massimi

20 March 2022 30	Juventus	2–0	Salernitana	Turin
15:00 CET (UTC+1)	Dybala 5'; Vlahović 29'; Pellegrini (yellow card) 40'; Danilo (yellow card) 82'; Rabiot (yellow card) 85'	Report	Coulibaly (yellow card) 24'; Verdi (yellow card) 68'	Stadium: Juventus Stadium; Attendance: 29,186; Referee: Giovanni Ayroldi

2 April 2022 31	Salernitana	0–1	Torino	Salerno
20:45 CEST (UTC+2)	Fazio (yellow card) 15' (yellow-red card) 85'; Bonazzoli (yellow card) 69'; Éderson (yellow card) 80'; Gyömbér (yellow card) 83'	Report	Belotti 18' (pen.), (yellow card) 35'; Izzo (yellow card) 64'; Berisha (yellow card) 69'; Singo (yellow card) 90'	Stadium: Stadio Arechi; Attendance: 8,650; Referee: Marco Piccinini

10 April 2022 32	Roma	2–1	Salernitana	Rome
18:00 CEST (UTC+2)	Kumbulla (yellow card) 21'; Cristante (yellow card) 54'; Mkhitaryan (yellow card) 80'; Pérez 82'; Smalling 85'; Abraham (yellow card) 90'; Patrício (yellow card) 90+3'	Report	Bohinen (yellow card) 13'; Radovanović 22', (yellow card) 90'; Đurić (yellow card) 30'; Gyömbér (yellow card) 41'; Ribéry (yellow card) 67'; Sepe (yellow card) 71'; Kastanos (yellow card) 76'; Zortea (yellow card) 81'	Stadium: Stadio Olimpico; Attendance: 64,266; Referee: Manuel Volpi

16 April 2022 33	Sampdoria	1–2	Salernitana	Genoa
14:30 CEST (UTC+2)	Caputo 32'; Sensi (yellow card) 89'	Report	Fazio 4'; Éderson 6'; Đurić (yellow card) 20'; Sepe (yellow card) 20'; Bonazzoli (yellow card) 49'; Bohinen (yellow card) 50'; Ribéry (yellow card) 79'; Mazzocchi (yellow card) 80'; Ranieri (yellow card) 84'	Stadium: Stadio Luigi Ferraris; Attendance: 14,908; Referee: Paolo Valeri

20 April 2022 19	Udinese	0–1	Salernitana	Udine
18:45 CEST (UTC+2)	Jajalo (yellow card) 31'; Marí (yellow card) 89'; Deulofeu (yellow card) 90+2'	Report	Ranieri (yellow card) 56'; Éderson (yellow card) 84'; Bohinen (yellow card) 86'; Kastanos (yellow card) 90+2'; Verdi 90+3', (yellow card) 90+4'	Stadium: Stadio Friuli; Attendance: 12,362; Referee: Simone Sozza
Note: Udinese were awarded a 3–0 win and Salernitana were docked an additional point after Salernitana players failed to show up for the match. Salernitana appealed the decision and the Italian Football Association court overturned it after the government approved a new sports protocol in January with clearer guidelines on when a match should be postponed for COVID-19 related reasons.

24 April 2022 34	Salernitana	2–1	Fiorentina	Salerno
12:30 CEST (UTC+2)	Đurić 9'; Gyömbér (yellow card) 22'; Bonazzoli 79'	Report	Saponara 64'; Milenković (yellow card) 83'	Stadium: Stadio Arechi; Attendance: 20,920; Referee: Davide Massa

2 May 2022 35	Atalanta	1–1	Salernitana	Bergamo
20:45 CEST (UTC+2)	Demiral (yellow card) 37'; Palomino (yellow card) 38'; Pašalić 88'; Freuler (yellow card) 90'	Report	Éderson 27'; Đurić (yellow card) 38'; Verdi (yellow card) 55'	Stadium: Gewiss Stadium; Attendance: 17,011; Referee: Marco Guida

5 May 2022 20	Salernitana	2–1	Venezia	Salerno
18:00 CEST (UTC+2)	Bonazzoli 7' (pen.); Éderson (yellow card) 54'; Verdi 67'; Bohinen (yellow card) 77'	Report	Ceccaroni (yellow card) 5'; Matějů (yellow card) 52'; Henry 58', (yellow card) 90+3'; Svoboda (yellow card) 61'; Busio (yellow card) 69'; Ampadu (yellow card) 89' (yellow-red card) 89'	Stadium: Stadio Arechi; Attendance: 22,200; Referee: Maurizio Mariani
Note: The match was originally scheduled for 6 January 2022, but was postponed to 5 May 2022 due to COVID-19 outbreaks within the squads.

8 May 2022 36	Salernitana	1–1	Cagliari	Salerno
18:00 CEST (UTC+2)	Bohinen (yellow card) 54'; Verdi 68' (pen.); Ribéry (red card) 69'; Zortea (yellow card) 86'; Radovanović (yellow card) 89'; Perotti (yellow card) 90+6'; Gyömbér (yellow card) 90+7'	Report	Pavoletti (yellow card) 63'; Cragno (yellow card) 67'; Radunović (red card) 73'; Altare 90+9'	Stadium: Stadio Arechi; Attendance: 27,396; Referee: Marco Di Bello

14 May 2022 37	Empoli	1–1	Salernitana	Empoli
15:00 CEST (UTC+2)	Cutrone 31'; Henderson (yellow card) 74'; Vicario (yellow card) 76'; Bajrami (yellow card) 90+1'	Report	Radovanović (yellow card) 74'; Bonazzoli 76'; Perotti (penalty missed) 84'; Éderson (yellow card) 85'	Stadium: Stadio Carlo Castellani; Attendance: 11,650; Referee: Davide Massa

22 May 2022 38	Salernitana	0–4	Udinese	Salerno
21:00 CEST (UTC+2)	Belec (yellow card) 45+4'	Report	Deulofeu 6'; Nestorovski 34'; Udogie 42'; Pereyra (penalty missed) 45+6', 57', (yellow card) 58'	Stadium: Stadio Arechi; Attendance: 29,739; Referee: Daniele Orsato

=== Coppa Italia ===
16 August 2021 First round	Salernitana	2–0	Reggina	Salerno
20:45 CEST (UTC+2)	Bonazzoli 45+2', 55'; Capezzi (yellow card) 86'	Report	Hetemaj (yellow card) 90+6'	Stadium: Stadio Arechi; Attendance: 2,476; Referee: Francesco Fourneau

14 December 2021 Second round	Genoa	1–0	Salernitana	Genoa
21:00 CET (UTC+1)	Galdames (yellow card) 21'; Vásquez (yellow card) 32'; Ekuban 76'	Report	Schiavone (yellow card) 11'; Vergani (yellow card) 45+2'; Di Tacchio (yellow card) 57'	Stadium: Stadio Luigi Ferraris; Referee: Marco Serra
