= Francesco Di Tacchio =

Italian footballer

Personal information
- Date of birth: 20 April 1990 (age 36)
- Place of birth: Trani, Italy
- Height: 1.85 m (6 ft 1 in)
- Position: Defensive midfielder

Team information
- Current team: Casertana (on loan from Catania)

Senior career*
Years	Team	Apps	(Gls)
2008–2009	Ascoli	12	(0)
2009–2013	Fiorentina	0	(0)
2010–2011	→ Frosinone (loan)	20	(1)
2011–2012	→ Juve Stabia (loan)	12	(0)
2012–2013	→ Perugia (loan)	12	(1)
2013	→ Virtus Entella (loan)	15	(1)
2013–2015	Virtus Entella	47	(1)
2015–2017	Pisa	53	(1)
2017–2018	Avellino	39	(1)
2018–2022	Salernitana	119	(6)
2022–2024	Ternana	35	(1)
2023	→ Südtirol (loan)	0	(0)
2023–2024	→ Ascoli (loan)	33	(0)
2024–	Catania	44	(2)
2026–	→ Casertana (loan)	0	(0)

International career^{‡}
2008	Italy U19	2	(0)
2008–2010	Italy U20	2	(0)
- * Club domestic league appearances and goals as of 29 August 2026 ‡ National team caps and goals as of 7 April 2010

Francesco Di Tacchio (born 20 April 1990) is an Italian professional footballer who plays as a defensive midfielder for Serie C Group C club Casertana on loan from Catania.

== Club career ==
Di Tacchio played his first Serie B match on 28 February 2009 against Avellino. In June 2009, was signed by Fiorentina, and Arturo Lupoli joined the opposite direction. Both clubs jointly contracted with both players. On 19 August 2010, he moved on loan to Frosinone. On 11 July 2011, he moved on loan to Juve Stabia. On 18 August 2012, he moved on loan to Perugia. On 31 January 2013, he moved on loan with option of full redemption to Virtus Entella. On 27 June Di Tacchio signed for Virtus Entella in a permanent transfer.

On 9 August 2018, he signed a three-year contract with Serie B club Salernitana.

On 28 June 2022, Di Tacchio moved to Ternana in Serie B on a three-year deal.

On 5 July 2023, he was transferred on loan with an option to buy to Serie B club Südtirol. Di Tacchio did not make any appearances for Südtirol before he was sent on a sub-loan to Ascoli on 30 August 2023.

== International career ==
Di Tacchio was capped for Italy U20 team at 2009 Mediterranean Games.

== Career statistics ==
=== Club ===
As of match played 23 August 2023

Appearances and goals by club, season and competition
Club	Season	League			National Cup (Note: Includes Coppa Italia, Coppa Italia Serie C)		Europe		Other		Total	
Club	Season	Division	Apps	Goals	Apps	Goals	Apps	Goals	Apps	Goals	Apps	Goals
Ascoli	2008–09	Serie B	12	0	0	0	—		—		12	0
Fiorentina	2009–10	Serie A	0	0	0	0	0	0	—		0	0
Frosinone (loan)	2010–11	Serie B	20	1	0	0	—		—		20	1
Juve Stabia (loan)	2011–12	Serie B	12	0	0	0	—		—		12	0
Perugia (loan)	2012–13	Lega Pro 1	12	1	2	1	—		—		14	2
Virtus Entella	2012–13	Lega Pro 1	13	1	0	0	—		2 (Note: Appearance(s) in Lega Pro/Serie C play-off)	0	15	1
Virtus Entella	2013–14	Lega Pro 1	21	1	3	1	—		—		24	2
Virtus Entella	2014–15	Serie B	26	0	1	0	—		—		27	0
Virtus Entella	Total		60	2	4	1	—		2	0	66	3
Pisa	2015–16	Lega Pro	13	0	1	0	—		5	0	19	0
Pisa	2016–17	Serie B	35	1	2	0	—		—		37	1
Pisa	Total		48	1	3	0	—		5	0	56	1
Avellino	2017–18	Serie B	39	1	2	0	—		—		41	1
Salernitana	2018–19	Serie B	34	3	0	0	—		2 (Note: Appearance(s) in Serie B play-out)	0	36	3
Salernitana	2019–20	Serie B	31	3	2	0	—		—		33	3
Salernitana	2020–21	Serie B	34	0	1	0	—		—		35	0
Salernitana	2021–22	Serie A	18	0	2	0	—		—		20	0
Salernitana	Total		117	6	5	0	—		2	0	124	6
Ternana	2022–23	Serie B	35	1	1	0	—		—		36	1
Career total			355	13	17	2	0	0	9	0	381	15
