= Mamadou Coulibaly (footballer, born 1999) =

Senegalese footballer (born 1999)

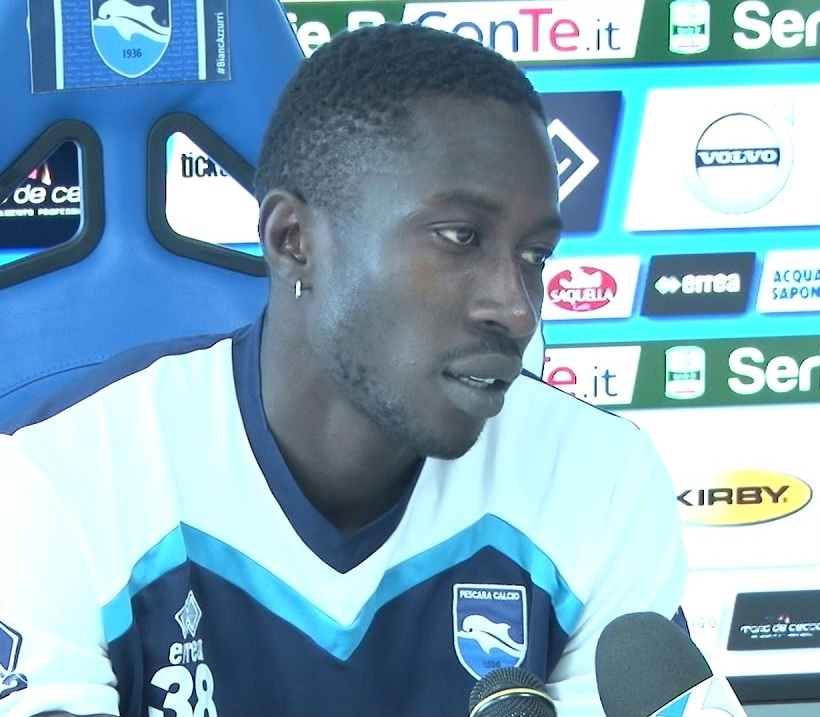
- Coulibaly with Pescara in 2017

Personal information
- Date of birth: 3 February 1999 (age 27)
- Place of birth: Thiès, Senegal
- Height: 1.83 m (6 ft 0 in)
- Position: Defensive midfielder

Team information
- Current team: Foggia
- Number: 8

Youth career
- 2017: Pescara

Senior career*
Years	Team	Apps	(Gls)
2017	Pescara	9	(0)
2017–2022	Udinese	3	(0)
2017–2018	→ Pescara (loan)	23	(2)
2019	→ Carpi (loan)	16	(2)
2019–2020	→ Virtus Entella (loan)	2	(0)
2020	→ Trapani (loan)	17	(2)
2021–2022	→ Salernitana (loan)	29	(2)
2022–2024	Salernitana	2	(0)
2022–2023	→ Ternana (loan)	28	(3)
2023–2024	→ Palermo (loan)	19	(1)
2024–2025	Catanzaro	22	(1)
2025–2026	Südtirol	13	(1)
2026–	Foggia	0	(0)
- * Club domestic league appearances and goals as of 2 March 2026

Mamadou Coulibaly (born 3 February 1999) is a Senegalese professional footballer who plays as a defensive midfielder for Serie C Group C club Foggia.

== Club career ==
Coulibaly arrived in Europe in 2015, having trained with Pescara for six months. Pescara announced they had signed Coulibaly permanently and he made his debut on 19 March 2017 in a 3–0 away loss against Atalanta.

On 12 July, a Udinese statement confirmed Coulibaly had put pen to paper on a five-year contract with the Zebrette. Still, he would stay with Pescara for the upcoming campaign.

On 22 January 2019, Coulibaly joined Serie B club Carpi on loan until 30 June 2019.

On 1 September 2019, he joined Virtus Entella on loan.

On 13 January 2020, he moved on another loan to Trapani.

He made four appearances for Udinese in the first half of the 2020–21 season before joining Salernitana in January on loan until June 2021. On 26 July 2021, Coulibaly returned to Salernitana on a new season-long loan, with a conditional obligation to buy.

On 9 August 2022, Coulibaly joined Ternana on loan with an option to buy and a conditional obligation to buy.

On 1 September 2023, Coulibaly was loaned out to Serie B club Palermo until the end of the season, with an option to buy.

On 30 August 2024, Coulibaly moved to Catanzaro.

On 10 July 2025, Coulibaly signed with Südtirol.

== Personal life ==
Coulibaly arrived in Europe in 2015, having fled his native Senegal. He spent a period homeless before being spotted by Pescara while playing football with friends.

== Career statistics ==
=== Club ===
As of match played 22 May 2022

Appearances and goals by club, season and competition
Club	League	Season	League		Cup		Europe		Other		Total	
Club	League	Season	Apps	Goals	Apps	Goals	Apps	Goals	Apps	Goals	Apps	Goals
Pescara	Serie A	2016–17	9	0	0	0	–		–		9	0
Pescara (loan)	Serie B	2017–18	23	2	3	1	–		–		26	3
Carpi (loan)	Serie B	2018–19	16	2	0	0	–		–		16	2
Virtus Entella (loan)	Serie B	2019–20	2	0	0	0	–		–		2	0
Trapani (loan)	Serie B	2019–20	17	2	0	0	–		–		17	2
Udinese	Serie A	2020–21	3	0	1	0	–		–		4	0
Salernitana (loan)	Serie B	2020–21	18	0	0	0	–		–		18	0
Salernitana (loan)	Serie A	2021–22	11	2	1	0	–		–		12	2
Salernitana (loan)	Total		29	2	1	0	0	0	0	0	30	2
Career total			89	7	5	1	0	0	0	0	94	8
