= Milan Đurić (footballer, born 1990) =

Bosnian footballer

Personal information
- Date of birth: 22 May 1990 (age 36)
- Place of birth: Tuzla, SR Bosnia and Herzegovina, SFR Yugoslavia
- Height: 1.99 m (6 ft 6 in)
- Position: Forward

Team information
- Current team: Cremonese
- Number: 11

Youth career
- 1998–2005: Vis Pesaro
- 2005–2006: San Marino
- 2006–2007: Cesena

Senior career*
Years	Team	Apps	(Gls)
2007–2010	Cesena	72	(8)
2010–2012	Parma	0	(0)
2010–2011	→ Ascoli (loan)	17	(2)
2011–2012	→ Crotone (loan)	45	(7)
2012–2017	Cesena	73	(15)
2012–2013	→ Cremonese (loan)	20	(3)
2013–2014	→ Trapani (loan)	13	(3)
2014	→ Cittadella (loan)	15	(4)
2017–2018	Bristol City	27	(5)
2018–2022	Salernitana	127	(28)
2022–2024	Hellas Verona	48	(6)
2024–2025	Monza	35	(8)
2025–2026	Parma	21	(1)
2026–	Cremonese	13	(0)

International career
2012	Bosnia and Herzegovina U21	4	(6)
2015–2020	Bosnia and Herzegovina	15	(7)
- * Club domestic league appearances and goals as of 24 October 2026

Milan Đurić (pronounced [mǐlan dʑûːritɕ]; born 22 May 1990) is a Bosnian professional footballer who plays as a forward for Serie B club Cremonese.

Đurić started his professional career at Cesena, before joining Parma in 2010, who loaned him to Ascoli later that year and to Crotone in 2011. In 2012, he came back to Cesena, who sent him on loan to Cremonese later that year, to Trapani in 2013 and to Cittadella 2014. He was transferred to Bristol City in 2017. The following year, Đurić signed with Salernitana. Four years later, he moved to Hellas Verona. In 2024, he switched to Monza. A year later, he returned to Parma. He went back to Cremonese in 2026.

A former youth international for Bosnia and Herzegovina, Đurić made his senior international debut in 2015, earning 15 caps until 2020.

== Club career ==
=== Early career ===
Because of the outbreak of the Bosnian War, Đurić's family fled from his native Bosnia and Herzegovina and moved to Italy, where he started playing football at local clubs, before joining Cesena's youth academy in 2006. He made his professional debut against Mantova on 30 October 2007 at the age of 17. On 8 December, he scored his first professional goal in a triumph over Frosinone.

In July 2010, Đurić switched to Parma in a co-ownership deal. In August, he was loaned to Ascoli for the rest of the campaign. In January 2011, he was sent on a six-month loan to Crotone. In June, his loan was extended for an additional season.

In the summer of 2012, Đurić returned to Cesena, who loaned him to Cremonese until the end of the season. In July 2013, he was sent on a season-long loan to Trapani. In January 2014, he was loaned to Cittadella for the remainder of the season.

=== Bristol City ===
In January 2017, Đurić moved to English side Bristol City on a contract until June 2019. He made his official debut for the team in an FA Cup clash against Fleetwood Town on 7 January. A week later, he made his league debut against Cardiff City. On 4 February, he scored his first goal for Bristol City against Rotherham United, which secured the victory for his squad.

=== Salernitana ===
In August 2018, Đurić signed a four-year deal with Salernitana. He made his competitive debut for the club on 25 August against Palermo. On 30 March 2019, he scored his first goal for Salernitana against Venezia.

He scored his first career hat-trick in a defeat of Cittadella on 13 April.

Đurić was an important piece in Salernitana's promotion to the Serie A, which was sealed on 10 May 2021. He had an impact of five goals and three assists.

On 12 September, he played his 100th match for the side against Torino.

=== Hellas Verona ===
In July 2022, Đurić switched to Hellas Verona on a three-year contract. He debuted officially for the team in a Coppa Italia tie against Bari on 7 August. A week later, he made his league debut against Napoli. On 4 January 2023, he scored his first goal for Hellas Verona against Torino.

=== Monza ===
In January 2024, Đurić was transferred to Monza for an undisclosed fee. He debuted competitively for the squad on 28 January against Sassuolo. On 7 April, he scored his first goal for Monza against Napoli.

=== Return to Parma ===
In January 2025, Đurić came back to Parma on a deal until June 2026. He played his first official game for the club against Milan on 26 January. On 10 May, he scored his first goal for Parma against Empoli.

=== Later stage of career ===
In January 2026, Đurić went back to Cremonese.

== International career ==
Đurić was a member of the Bosnia and Herzegovina under-21 team under coach Vlado Jagodić.

In March 2015, he received his first senior call up, for a UEFA Euro 2016 qualifier against Andorra and a friendly game against Austria. He debuted against the former on 28 March.

On 10 October, in a UEFA Euro 2016 qualifier against Wales, Đurić scored his first senior international goal. Three days later, he scored a goal against Cyprus, ensuring the triumph for his team and sending them into the UEFA Euro 2016 qualifying play-offs.

He retired from international football on 25 May 2022.

== Personal life ==
Đurić's father Goran was also a professional footballer, as is his younger brother Marco.

He married his long-time girlfriend Bianca in July 2016. Together they have two children, a daughter named Alice and a son named Cristian.

== Career statistics ==
=== Club ===
As of match played 24 October 2026

Appearances and goals by club, season and competition
Club	Season	League			National cup (Note: Includes Coppa Italia, FA Cup)		League cup (Note: Includes EFL Cup)		Other		Total	
Club	Season	Division	Apps	Goals	Apps	Goals	Apps	Goals	Apps	Goals	Apps	Goals
Cesena	2007–08	Serie B	24	2	0	0	–		–		24	2
Cesena	2008–09	Lega Pro Prima Divisione	21	3	1	0	–		–		22	3
Cesena	2009–10	Serie B	27	3	2	1	–		–		29	4
Cesena	Total		72	8	3	1	–		–		75	9
Ascoli (loan)	2010–11	Serie B	17	2	0	0	–		–		17	2
Crotone (loan)	2010–11	Serie B	16	5	–		–		–		16	5
Crotone (loan)	2011–12	Serie B	29	2	3	2	–		–		32	4
Crotone (loan)	Total		45	7	3	2	–		–		48	9
Cremonese (loan)	2012–13	Lega Pro Prima Divisione	20	3	3	1	–		–		23	4
Trapani (loan)	2013–14	Serie B	13	3	2	0	–		–		15	3
Cittadella (loan)	2013–14	Serie B	15	4	–		–		–		15	4
Cesena	2014–15	Serie A	28	2	2	1	–		–		30	3
Cesena	2015–16	Serie B	26	7	1	1	–		1 (Note: Appearance in Serie B promotion play-offs)	0	28	8
Cesena	2016–17	Serie B	19	6	2	0	–		–		21	6
Cesena	Total		73	15	5	2	–		1	0	79	17
Bristol City	2016–17	Championship	11	2	3	0	–		–		14	2
Bristol City	2017–18	Championship	16	3	0	0	1	1	–		17	4
Bristol City	Total		27	5	3	0	1	1	–		31	6
Salernitana	2018–19	Serie B	26	6	0	0	–		2 (Note: Appearances in Serie B relegation play-out)	1	28	7
Salernitana	2019–20	Serie B	33	12	0	0	–		–		33	12
Salernitana	2020–21	Serie B	35	5	1	0	–		–		36	5
Salernitana	2021–22	Serie A	33	5	2	0	–		–		35	5
Salernitana	Total		127	28	3	0	–		2	1	132	29
Hellas Verona	2022–23	Serie A	28	1	1	0	–		1 (Note: Appearance in Serie A relegation tie-breaker)	0	30	1
Hellas Verona	2023–24	Serie A	20	5	1	1	–		–		21	6
Hellas Verona	Total		48	6	2	1	–		1	0	51	7
Monza	2023–24	Serie A	17	4	–		–		–		17	4
Monza	2024–25	Serie A	18	4	0	0	–		–		18	4
Monza	Total		35	8	0	0	–		–		35	8
Parma	2024–25	Serie A	9	1	–		–		–		9	1
Parma	2025–26	Serie A	12	0	1	0	–		–		13	0
Parma	Total		21	1	1	0	–		–		22	1
Cremonese	2025–26	Serie A	11	0	–		–		–		11	0
Cremonese	2026–27	Serie B	2	0	1	0	–		–		3	0
Cremonese	Total		13	0	1	0	–		–		14	0
Career total			526	90	26	7	1	1	4	1	557	99

=== International ===
Appearances and goals by national team and year
National team	Year	Apps	Goals
Bosnia and Herzegovina
Bosnia and Herzegovina	2015	6	2
Bosnia and Herzegovina	2016	8	5
Bosnia and Herzegovina	2017	0	0
Bosnia and Herzegovina	2018	0	0
Bosnia and Herzegovina	2019	0	0
Bosnia and Herzegovina	2020	1	0
Total		15	7

Scores and results list Bosnia and Herzegovina's goal tally first, score column indicates score after each Đurić goal.

List of international goals scored by Milan Đurić
No.	Date	Venue	Cap	Opponent	Score	Result	Competition
1	10 October 2015	Bilino Polje, Zenica, Bosnia and Herzegovina	3	Wales	1–0	2–0	UEFA Euro 2016 qualifying
2	13 October 2015	GSP Stadium, Nicosia, Cyprus	4	Cyprus	3–2	3–2	UEFA Euro 2016 qualifying
3	25 March 2016	Stade Josy Barthel, Luxembourg City, Luxembourg	7	Luxembourg	2–0	3–0	Friendly
4	3 June 2016	Toyota Stadium, Toyota, Japan	9	Denmark	1–2	2–2	2016 Kirin Cup
5	3 June 2016	Toyota Stadium, Toyota, Japan	9	Denmark	2–2	2–2	2016 Kirin Cup
6	7 June 2016	Suita Stadium, Osaka, Japan	10	Japan	1–1	2–1	2016 Kirin Cup
7	7 June 2016	Suita Stadium, Osaka, Japan	10	Japan	2–1	2–1	2016 Kirin Cup

== Honours ==
Cesena

- Lega Pro Prima Divisione: 2008–09
