= Sedrick Kalombo =

Italian footballer (born 1995)

Personal information
- Full name: Mbuyamba Sedrick Kalombo
- Date of birth: 8 February 1995 (age 31)
- Place of birth: Fano, Italy
- Height: 1.78 m (5 ft 10 in)
- Position: Midfielder

Team information
- Current team: Urbania
- Number: 30

Youth career
- Lecce

Senior career*
Years	Team	Apps	(Gls)
2013–2015	Lecce	2	(0)
2013–2014	→ Nocerina (loan)	1	(0)
2014–2015	→ Martina Franca (loan)	28	(0)
2015–2018	Gubbio	67	(7)
2018–2021	Salernitana	5	(0)
2018	→ Pro Piacenza (loan)	15	(0)
2019	→ Rimini (loan)	11	(0)
2020	→ Rieti (loan)	5	(0)
2020–2021	→ Foggia (loan)	34	(0)
2022	Tsarsko Selo	13	(1)
2022	Nuova Florida	8	(0)
2023	Minyor Pernik	13	(0)
2023	Jazz	10	(1)
2023–2024	Fano	15	(0)
- * Club domestic league appearances and goals as of 22 March 2026

Sedrick Mbuyamba Kalombo (born 8 February 1995) is an Italian professional footballer who plays as a midfielder for Eccellenza Marche club ASD Urbania Calcio.

He is of DR Congolese descent.

== Club career ==
Kalombo made his Serie C debut for Lecce on 10 March 2013 in a game against Lumezzane.

On 31 January 2019, he joined Rimini on loan.

On 31 January 2020, he was loaned to Rieti.

On 3 October 2020, he joined Foggia on loan.

On 4 February 2022, he joined Bulgarian first tier club FC Tsarsko Selo Sofia.

On 13 October 2022, he joined Nuova Florida.

On 16 November 2023, he joined Alma Juventus Fano 1906.
