= Andrea Schiavone (footballer) =

Italian footballer (born 1993)

Personal information
- Date of birth: 25 February 1993 (age 33)
- Place of birth: Turin, Italy
- Height: 1.80 m (5 ft 11 in)
- Position: Midfielder

Team information
- Current team: Pro Patria
- Number: 8

Youth career
- 2000–2012: Juventus

Senior career*
Years	Team	Apps	(Gls)
2012–2016	Juventus	0	(0)
2013–2014	→ Siena (loan)	21	(2)
2014–2015	→ Modena (loan)	36	(2)
2015–2016	→ Livorno (loan)	35	(0)
2016–2018	Cesena	64	(5)
2018–2019	Venezia	25	(0)
2019–2021	Bari	25	(0)
2020–2021	→ Salernitana (loan)	28	(0)
2021–2022	Salernitana	14	(1)
2022–2023	Südtirol	15	(0)
2024	Olbia	10	(0)
2025–	Pro Patria	12	(0)

International career^{‡}
2008–2009	Italy U16	3	(0)
2009–2010	Italy U17	2	(0)
2011–2012	Italy U19	7	(1)
2012–2014	Italy U20	13	(0)
2012	Italy U21	1	(0)
- * Club domestic league appearances and goals as of 30 April 2026 ‡ National team caps and goals as of 5 December 2014

Andrea Schiavone (born 25 February 1993) is an Italian professional footballer who plays as a midfielder for Serie D club Pro Patria.

== Club career ==
=== Juventus ===
Born in Turin, Schiavone began his playing career within the youth ranks of local giants, Juventus in 2000. Working his way through the club's renowned youth academy, Schiavone was promoted to the Primavera (under-20) squad in 2010, and going on to captain the team before graduating the academy at the conclusion of the 2012–13 season. Schiavone was one of the four overage player for the Primavera that season, as the age limit had changed to under-19. Half of the registration rights of Schiavone was also sold to Siena for €1.5 million, as a cashless swap with Marcel Büchel. Initially set to join the reigning champions' first–team during the 2013 pre–season ritiro, Schiavone was instead sent to recently relegated Serie B side, A.C. Siena in order to experience regular first-team football.

=== Siena ===
On 1 July 2013, Schiavone formally became a player of Siena. Schiavone went on to become an important part of the Tuscan outfit who would have finished third in the 2013–14 Serie B and, in turn, earn a promotion play-off spot were it not for an eight-point deduction thanks to financial irregularities. He finished his first season of professional football having made 21 league appearances for the Robur, scoring two goals.

On 18 June 2014, Juventus and Siena had reached an agreement for the co-ownership of the player to be renewed for another year, with Siena keeping hold of the player's registration rights ahead of the 2014–15 Serie B season. The new agreement would expire on 19 June 2015.

=== Return to Juventus ===
On 15 July 2014, Juventus officially re-signed their former youth team captain after Siena officially bankrupted following their failure to register for the upcoming Serie B campaign, and thus being entered into Serie D for the 2014–15 Serie D season. All of their players were therefore released from their contracts and free to sign on with other clubs. Schiavone was re-signed by Juventus instead.

=== Cesena ===
On 1 July 2016, he was signed by Serie B club Cesena.

The club folded in 2018.

=== Venezia ===
In July 2018 Schiavone joined Venezia on a three-year contract.

=== Bari ===
On 24 July 2019, he signed a three-year contract with Bari.

=== Salernitana ===
On 23 September 2020, he joined Salernitana on loan with an obligation to buy.

=== Südtirol ===
On 2 September 2022, Schiavone joined Südtirol until the end of the 2022–23 season.

== International career ==
Schiavone has represented Italy at various youth levels. He has appeared in 24 matches for the Azzurini and has scored one goal. Eleven of his 24 international matches came for the Italy under-20 national team.

== Career statistics ==
=== Club ===
As of match played 23 August 2023

Appearances and goals by club, season and competition
Club	Season	League			National Cup (Note: Includes Coppa Italia, Coppa Italia Serie C)		Europe		Other		Total	
Club	Season	Division	Apps	Goals	Apps	Goals	Apps	Goals	Apps	Goals	Apps	Goals
Juventus	2012–13	Serie A	0	0	0	0	0	0	0	0	0	0
Siena	2013–14	Serie B	21	2	3	0	—		—		24	2
Modena (loan)	2014–15	Serie B	35	2	3	1	—		1 (Note: Appearance(s) in Serie B play-out)	0	39	3
Livorno (loan)	2015–16	Serie B	35	0	2	0	—		—		37	0
Cesena	2016–17	Serie B	30	1	4	1	—		—		34	2
Cesena	2017–18	Serie B	34	4	1	0	—		—		35	4
Cesena	Total		64	5	5	1	—		—		69	6
Venezia	2018–19	Serie B	23	0	1	0	—		2 (Note: Appearance(s) in Serie C play-off)	0	26	0
Bari	2019–20	Serie C	25	0	1	0	—		3	0	29	0
Salernitana	2020–21	Serie B	28	0	2	0	—		—		30	0
Salernitana	2021–22	Serie A	14	1	1	0	—		—		15	1
Salernitana	Total		42	1	3	0	—		—		45	1
Südtirol	2022–23	Serie B	15	0	0	0	—		—		15	0
Career total			260	10	18	2	0	0	6	0	284	12
