= André Anderson (footballer) =

Brazilian-Italian footballer (born 1999)

Personal information
- Full name: André Anderson Pomilio Lima da Silva Costa
- Date of birth: 23 September 1999 (age 27)
- Place of birth: Maracaí, Brazil
- Height: 1.80 m (5 ft 11 in)
- Position: Attacking midfielder

Team information
- Current team: Pouso Alegre

Youth career
- 2009–2018: Santos

Senior career*
Years	Team	Apps	(Gls)
2018–2025	Lazio	10	(0)
2018–2019	→ Salernitana (loan)	17	(2)
2020–2021	→ Salernitana (loan)	28	(5)
2022–2023	→ São Paulo (loan)	10	(0)
2025–	Pouso Alegre	2	(0)

International career
2019	Italy U20	5	(1)
- * Club domestic league appearances and goals as of 25 May 2025

André Anderson Pomilio Lima da Silva Costa (born 23 September 1999), known simply as André Anderson, is a professional footballer who plays as an attacking midfielder in brazilian club Pouso Alegre. Born in Brazil, he has represented Italy at youth level.

== Club career ==
=== Early career ===
Born in Maracaí but raised in Pedrinhas Paulista, both in the São Paulo state, André Anderson joined Santos FC's youth setup in 2009. Initially playing in the club's futsal youth squads, he moved to football in 2010, and subsequently progressed through the youth setup.

A spotlight in the club's youth categories, André Anderson signed his first professional deal with the club in November 2015, running until October 2018. In July of the latter year, he rejected an offer of renewal.

=== Lazio ===
On 14 August 2018, André Anderson signed for Serie A club Lazio.

==== Loan to Salernitana ====
On 17 August 2018, André Anderson joined Serie B club Salernitana on a season-long loan. He made his professional debut on 4 November, coming on as a second-half substitute for Antonio Palumbo in 1–0 away loss against Venezia.

André Anderson scored his first professional goal on 18 January 2019, netting the equalizer in a 2–1 away defeat of Palermo. Back from loan in July 2019, he was included in Lazio's first team squad, and made his Serie A debut on 1 December, replacing Luis Alberto late into a 3–0 home win over Udinese.

==== Second loan to Salernitana ====
On 5 October 2020, André Anderson returned to Salernitana on loan. He scored five goals for the club during the season before returning to Lazio in July 2021, where he also featured rarely afterwards.

==== Loan to São Paulo ====
On 11 April 2022, André Anderson joined São Paulo on loan until 30 June 2023, with an option to buy. He only featured in 12 matches (none of them in the 2023 season), before being dismissed by the club in June 2023; he later notified the club to request a loan extension for a further year.

== International career ==
Although born in Brazil, André Anderson is eligible for Italy due to his ancestry. On 4 February 2019, he was called up to the latter's under-20s.

== Career statistics ==
As of 5 July 2023

Appearances and goals by club, season and competition
Club	Season	League			Cup		Continental		Other		Total	
Club	Season	Division	Apps	Goals	Apps	Goals	Apps	Goals	Apps	Goals	Apps	Goals
Lazio	2018–19	Serie A	0	0	0	0	—		—		0	0
Lazio	2019–20	Serie A	6	0	1	0	0	0	0	0	7	0
Lazio	2020–21	Serie A	0	0	0	0	0	0	—		0	0
Lazio	2021–22	Serie A	4	0	0	0	0	0	—		4	0
Lazio	2023–24	Serie A	0	0	0	0	0	0	0	0	0	0
Lazio	Total		10	0	1	0	0	0	0	0	11	0
Salernitana (loan)	2018–19	Serie B	18	2	0	0	—		—		18	2
Salernitana (loan)	2020–21	Serie B	28	5	0	0	—		—		28	5
São Paulo (loan)	2022	Série A	10	0	2	0	0	0	—		12	0
Career total			66	7	3	0	0	0	0	0	69	7

== Honours ==
Lazio

- Supercoppa Italiana: 2019

São Paulo

- Copa Sudamericana runner-up: 2022
