= Marco Firenze =

Italian footballer (born 1993)

Personal information
- Date of birth: 26 June 1993 (age 33)
- Place of birth: Genoa, Italy
- Height: 1.80 m (5 ft 11 in)
- Position: Midfielder

Team information
- Current team: ASD Rivasamba HCA

Youth career
- –2012: Parma

Senior career*
Years	Team	Apps	(Gls)
2012–2013	Parma	0	(0)
2012	→ Pistoiese (loan)	16	(4)
2012	→ Pontedera (loan)	4	(0)
2013	Giacomense	0	(0)
2013–2014	Tuttocuoio	4	(0)
2014–2015	Sestri Levante	36	(13)
2015–2019	Crotone	31	(4)
2016	→ Catanzaro (loan)	12	(0)
2016–2017	→ Siena (loan)	11	(2)
2017	→ Paganese (loan)	15	(9)
2017	→ Pro Vercelli (loan)	17	(5)
2018	→ Venezia (loan)	7	(2)
2019–2021	Salernitana	9	(1)
2020	→ Venezia (loan)	11	(2)
2020–2021	→ Novara (loan)	10	(1)
2021	→ Padova (loan)	15	(3)
2021–2022	Paganese	31	(6)
2022–2023	Sestri Levante	6	(0)
2023	Sangiuliano	10	(1)
2023–2024	Messina	24	(1)
2024–2025	Potenza	9	(0)
2025	Clodiense	11	(2)
2025–	ASD Rivasamba HCA		
- * Club domestic league appearances and goals as of 4 November 2026

Marco Firenze (born 26 June 1993) is an Italian footballer who plays as a midfielder for ASD Rivasamba HCA.

== Career ==
In July 2012, Firenze moved to Pontedera on a year-long loan deal.

On 12 July 2019, Firenze signed to Serie B club Salernitana. On 31 January 2020, he returned to Venezia on loan with an option to buy. On 4 October 2020 he was loaned to Novara. On 25 January 2021 he moved on a new loan to Padova. On 27 August 2021, his Salernitana contract was terminated by mutual consent.

On 13 September 2021, he signed with Paganese in Serie C.

On 11 January 2023, Firenze joined Sangiuliano.

On 10 August 2023, Firenze moved to Messina on a one-season contract.

On 6 August 2024, Firenze signed with Potenza.
