= Mirko Esposito =

Italian football player

Personal information
- Date of birth: 8 April 1996 (age 30)
- Place of birth: Fidenza, Italy
- Height: 1.72 m (5 ft 7 1/2 in)
- Position: Right back

Team information
- Current team: Gudja United
- Number: 88

Youth career
- –2015: Parma

Senior career*
Years	Team	Apps	(Gls)
2015	Parma	1	(0)
2015–2018	Crotone	0	(0)
2015–2016	→ Paganese (loan)	27	(0)
2016–2017	→ Catanzaro (loan)	34	(0)
2017–2018	→ Catania (loan)	18	(0)
2018–2019	Sicula Leonzio	18	(1)
2019	Robur Siena	8	(1)
2019–2022	Salernitana	0	(0)
2019–2020	→ Rieti (loan)	22	(0)
2020–2022	→ Mantova (loan)	20	(0)
2023–	Gudja United	25	(0)
- * Club domestic league appearances and goals as of 13 May 2024

Mirko Esposito (born 8 April 1996) is an Italian professional footballer who plays as a right back for Maltese side Gudja United.

== Club career ==
He made his Serie A debut for Parma on 24 May 2015 in a game against Verona. Parma went bankrupt at the end of the season and he became a free agent, signing with Crotone.

On 31 January 2019, he signed a 6-month contract with Robur Siena.

On 2 September 2019, he joined Rieti on loan. On 17 September 2020 he moved on new loan to Mantova.
