= Vid Belec =

Slovenian footballer (born 1990)

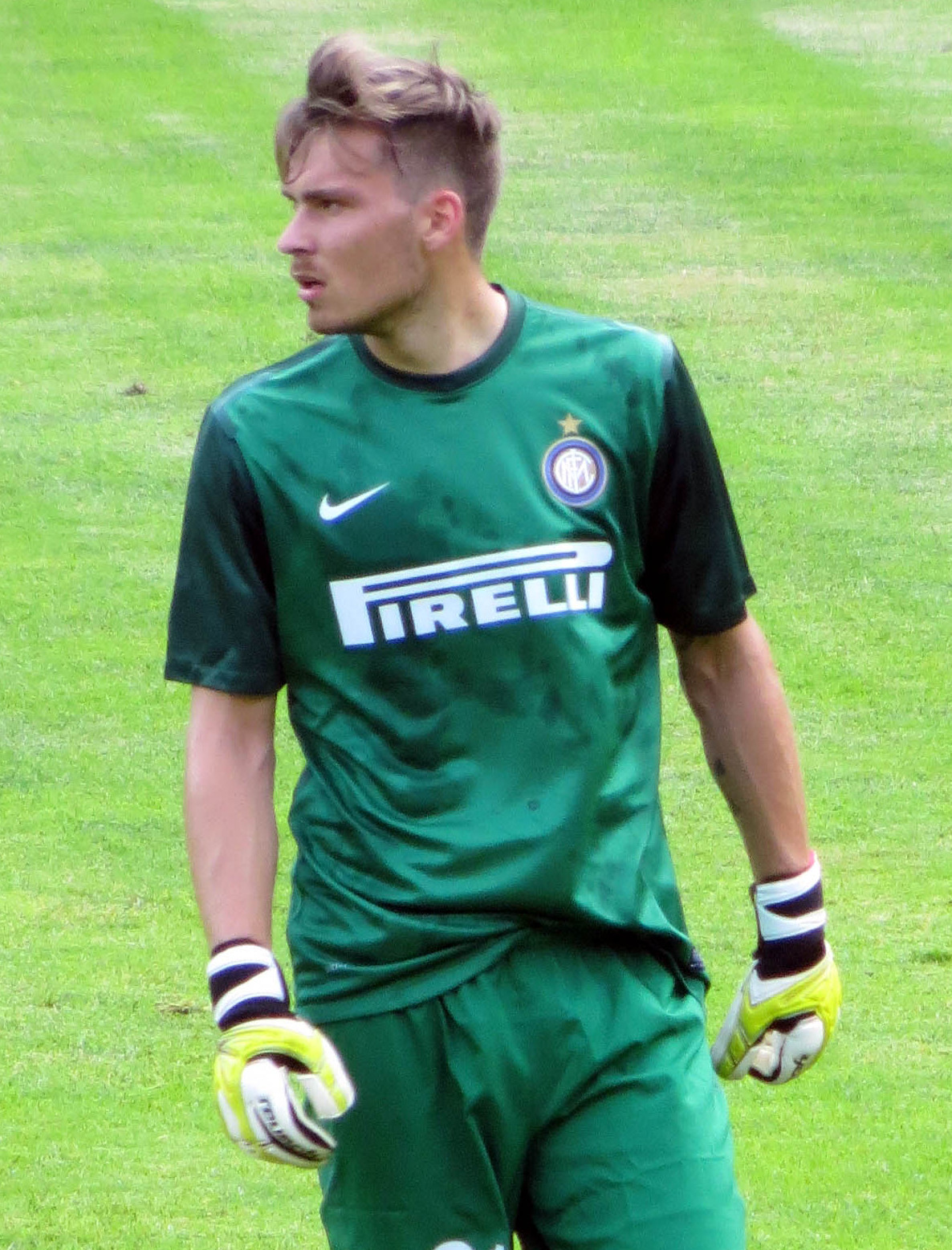
- Belec playing for Inter Milan in 2012

Personal information
- Date of birth: 6 June 1990 (age 36)
- Place of birth: Maribor, SR Slovenia, Yugoslavia
- Height: 1.92 m (6 ft 4 in)
- Position: Goalkeeper

Team information
- Current team: APOEL
- Number: 27

Youth career
- 2002–2007: Maribor
- 2007–2010: Inter Milan

Senior career*
| Years | Team | Apps | (Gls) |
| 2010–2015 | Inter Milan | 0 | (0) |
| 2010–2012 | → Crotone (loan) | 50 | (0) |
| 2013–2014 | → Olhanense (loan) | 22 | (0) |
| 2014–2015 | → Konyaspor (loan) | 14 | (0) |
| 2015–2017 | Carpi | 56 | (0) |
| 2017–2018 | Benevento | 13 | (0) |
| 2018 | → Sampdoria (loan) | 2 | (0) |
| 2018–2020 | Sampdoria | 0 | (0) |
| 2019–2020 | → APOEL (loan) | 21 | (0) |
| 2020–2022 | Salernitana | 57 | (0) |
| 2022– | APOEL | 123 | (0) |

International career
| 2006 | Slovenia U17 | 4 | (0) |
| 2007 | Slovenia U18 | 4 | (0) |
| 2007–2009 | Slovenia U19 | 7 | (0) |
| 2014–2024 | Slovenia | 21 | (0) |
- * Club domestic league appearances and goals as of 14 June 2026

Vid Belec (Slovene pronunciation: [ˈʋíːd ˈbéːləts]; born 6 June 1990) is a Slovenian professional footballer who plays as a goalkeeper for Cypriot First Division club APOEL.

== Club career ==
=== Inter Milan ===
Signed by Inter Milan along with Rene Krhin at the age of 16, Belec spent three-and-a-half seasons with the Inter Milan Primavera team. In the first season he was a backup for Paolo Tornaghi and won the Primavera Scudetto that season. He also played for Campionato Nazionale Allievi under-17 youth team in the 2006–07 season. In the 2007–08 season, at first he had to compete with Enrico Alfonso for the starting place in Primavera team until Alfonso left the club in January 2008. He then became the fourth keeper of Inter's first team and the first choice in Primavera, which won the 2008 Torneo di Viareggio and finished as the league runners-up. Under José Mourinho, Belec was promoted to the senior team and made his first team debut on 17 July 2009, in a pre-season friendly. He also played at the World Football Challenge.

In November 2009, he signed a reported five-year contract with the club.

=== Crotone ===
On 6 July 2010, Belec completed a loan to Serie B club Crotone. He made his debut on 4 September 2010 after the first-choice keeper Emanuele Concetti was not available. He then became the starting goalkeeper ahead of Concetti since round 18.

However, in the 2011–12 Serie B season, his former Inter teammate Giacomo Bindi took the starting place from round 2 to 4, and again since round 10. However, after a 3–0 defeat to Brescia, Belec re-took the starting place in January 2012.

=== Return to Inter Milan ===
Belec returned to Inter during the summer 2012 window after his loan deal to Crotone expired. He was kept as a third choice keeper behind Samir Handanović and Luca Castellazzi. He made his first team debut on 30 August as a substitute in a UEFA Europa League game against FC Vaslui to replace Antonio Cassano after starting goalkeeper Castellazzi was sent off.

=== Olhanense ===
On 15 July 2013, Belec completed a loan to Olhanense, from the Portuguese Primeira Liga.

=== Konyaspor ===
On 1 September 2014, Belec was signed by Konyaspor in a temporary deal. On 2 February 2015 the loan was terminated.

=== Carpi ===
In summer 2015, Belec terminated his contract with Inter Milan. On 31 August 2015, he signed with Carpi F.C. 1909 for one season. He made his debut in Serie A in a win against Torino on 10 October 2015. After debut he became a regular starter in first eleven for Carpi. On 30 May 2016, he signed a new two-year deal with Carpi.

=== Benevento ===
In July 2017, Belec signed a three-year contract with Serie A side Benevento.

=== APOEL ===
On 23 June 2019, Belec joined APOEL on loan with an obligation to buy after two seasons.

=== Salernitana ===
On 25 September 2020, he moved to Serie B club Salernitana.

=== Return to APOEL ===
On 27 June 2022, Belec returned to APOEL on a three-year deal.

== International career ==
Belec was the first-choice goalkeeper for the Slovenia under-19 team in the 2008 and 2009 UEFA European Under-19 Football Championship qualifications. He received his first call-up to the Slovenia under-21 team in August 2010 as the backup goalkeeper to Jan Koprivec.

Belec received a call-up from the senior team in February 2011, after the injury of Samir Handanović, for a friendly match against Albania. However, he had to wait until June 2014 to make his debut, starting and playing the full 90 minutes in a friendly against Argentina after first-choice goalkeepers Handanović and Jan Oblak contracted food poisoning. In total, Belec made 21 appearances for Slovenia until his retirement in August 2024.
