= Antonio Russo (footballer) =

Italian footballer (born 2000)

Personal information
- Date of birth: 1 February 2000 (age 26)
- Place of birth: Acerra, Italy
- Height: 1.88 m (6 ft 2 in)
- Position: Goalkeeper

Team information
- Current team: Real Aversa

Youth career
- 2018–2019: Salernitana

Senior career*
Years	Team	Apps	(Gls)
2017–2018	Sarnese	29	(0)
2019–2022	Salernitana	0	(0)
2019–2020	→ Marsala (loan)	26	(0)
2020–2021	→ Bisceglie (loan)	18	(0)
2022	Taranto	0	(0)
2022–	Real Aversa		
- * Club domestic league appearances and goals as of 22 May 2022

Antonio Russo (born 1 February 2000) is an Italian football player. He plays for Real Aversa.

== Club career ==
He made his senior debut in the 2017–18 season for Serie D club Sarnese. In the summer of 2018, he joined Salernitana and was assigned to their Under-19 squad.

For the 2019–20 season, he was loaned to Marsala in Serie D.

On 7 October 2020, he joined Serie C side Bisceglie on loan. He made his professional debut for Bisceglie on 18 October 2020 in a game against Palermo. He finished the loan with 18 league appearances after losing his starting spot to Andrea Spurio in February 2021.

On 19 July 2022, Russo moved to Taranto. Having departed the club in October, he joined Real Agro Aversa in November 2022.
