= Francesco Orlando (footballer) =

Italian footballer

Personal information
- Date of birth: 1 October 1996 (age 30)
- Place of birth: Taranto, Italy
- Height: 1.68 m (5 ft 6 in)
- Position: Winger

Team information
- Current team: Cavese
- Number: 24

Youth career
- –2013: Virtus Francavilla
- 2013–2014: Vicenza
- 2013: → Nardò (loan)

Senior career*
Years	Team	Apps	(Gls)
2014–2017	Vicenza	14	(2)
2014	→ Real Metapontino (loan)	12	(1)
2014–2015	→ Chieti (loan)	34	(4)
2015–2016	→ Maceratese (loan)	24	(3)
2017–2018	Lazio	0	(0)
2017–2018	→ Salernitana (loan)	1	(0)
2018–2023	Salernitana	4	(0)
2019–2020	→ Sambenedettese (loan)	22	(2)
2020–2021	→ Juve Stabia (loan)	23	(6)
2021–2022	→ Alessandria (loan)	11	(0)
2023	→ Siena (loan)	13	(0)
2023–2024	Taranto	26	(2)
2024–2025	Foggia	29	(2)
2025–	Cavese	36	(10)
- * Club domestic league appearances and goals as of 1 May 2026

Francesco Orlando (born 1 October 1996) is an Italian professional footballer who plays as a winger for Serie C Group C club Cavese.

== Club career ==
Orlando made his professional debut in the Lega Pro for Maceratese on 6 September 2015, coming on as an 84th-minute substitute in a 1–0 loss to Lupa Roma.

On 20 July 2018, he joined Serie B club Salernitana on a three-year contract with an option for a fourth, after previously playing on them on loan.

On 30 July 2019, he joined Sambenedettese on loan.

On 30 September 2020, he was loaned to Serie C club Juve Stabia.

On 2 August 2021, he joined Serie B side Alessandria on loan for the season.

On 9 January 2023, Orlando moved on loan to Siena.

On 31 August 2023, Orlando signed a one-season contract with Taranto.

On 12 July 2024, Orlando joined Foggia on a two-year contract.
