= Tiago Casasola =

Argentine footballer (born 1995)

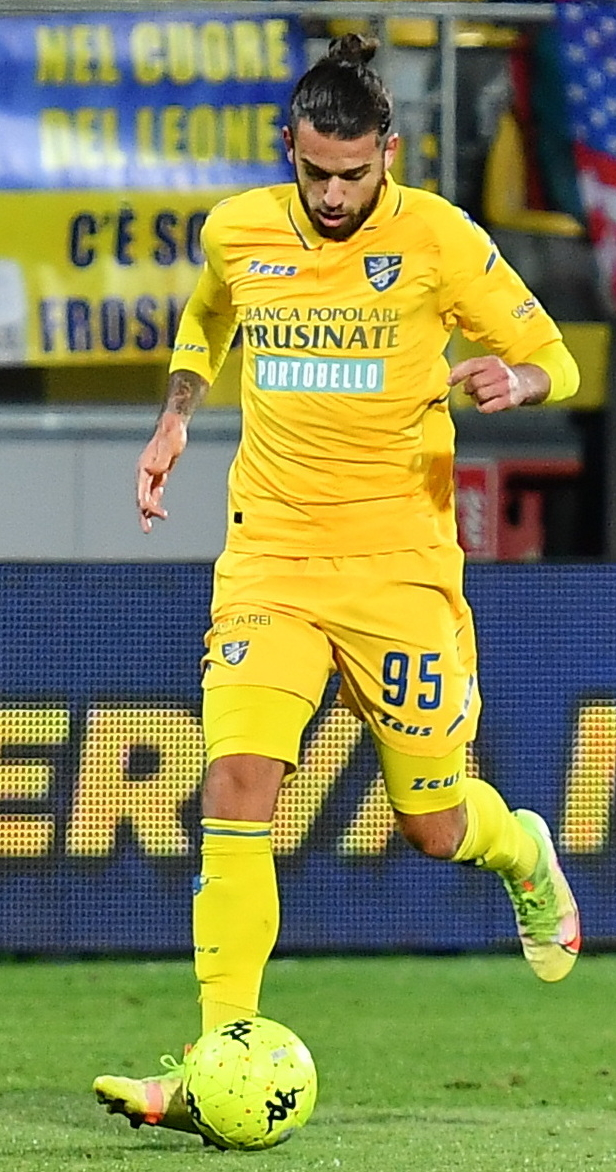
- Casasola with Frosinone Calcio in 2021

Personal information
- Full name: Tiago Matías Casasola
- Date of birth: 11 August 1995 (age 31)
- Place of birth: Buenos Aires, Argentina
- Height: 1.88 m (6 ft 2 in)
- Positions: Wide midfielder; right-back; centre-back

Team information
- Current team: Union Brescia

Youth career
- –2012: CA Huracan
- 2012–2014: Boca Juniors

Senior career*
Years	Team	Apps	(Gls)
2014–2015	Fulham	0	(0)
2015–2017	Roma	0	(0)
2015–2016	→ Como (loan)	27	(0)
2016–2017	→ Trapani (loan)	32	(2)
2017–2018	Alessandria	17	(2)
2018–2019	Salernitana	36	(6)
2019–2022	Lazio	0	(0)
2019	→ Salernitana (loan)	15	(2)
2020	→ Cosenza (loan)	17	(0)
2020–2021	→ Salernitana (loan)	35	(3)
2021–2022	→ Frosinone (loan)	11	(0)
2022	→ Cremonese (loan)	9	(1)
2022–2023	Perugia	35	(9)
2023–2025	Ternana	71	(7)
2025–2026	Catania	34	(3)
2026–	Union Brescia	0	(0)

International career
2015	Argentina U20	5	(0)
- * Club domestic league appearances and goals as of 1 May 2026

Tiago Casasola (born 11 August 1995) is an Argentine professional footballer who plays as a wide midfielder, right-back or centre-back for Italian Serie C Group A club Union Brescia.

== Club career ==
=== Early career ===
Casasola started his youth football career at CA Huracan. In August 2012, he moved to Boca Juniors.

=== Fulham ===
On 22 August 2014, Casasola transferred to the senior team of English club Fulham for an undisclosed fee. However, he failed to play a single game for them during his time there.

==== Loan to Como ====
His contract with Fulham was terminated by mutual consent, and he joined Italian club Como on loan on 29 August 2015. Casasola made his league debut against Vicenza on 19 September 2015. He played 27 league games in the 2015–16 Serie B season.

=== Roma ===
At the end of the 2015–16 season, Casasola was released by Como and was signed by Serie A team Roma.

==== Loan to Trapani ====
On 5 August 2016, Casasola signed a season-long loan with Serie B side Trapani.

=== Lazio ===
On 31 January 2019, his rights were bought by Lazio, and he was loaned back to his previous club Salernitana for the remainder of the 2018–19 season.

==== Loan to Cosenza ====
After not playing in the first half of the 2019–20 season, on 30 January 2020, he was loaned to Serie B club Cosenza.

==== Loan to Salernitana ====
On 18 September 2020, he returned to Salernitana on loan.

==== Loan to Frosinone ====
On 31 August 2021, he was loaned to Frosinone in Serie B.

==== Loan to Cremonese ====
On 27 January 2022, he moved on a new loan to Cremonese in the same league.

=== Perugia ===
On 11 July 2022, Casasola moved to Perugia. On 25 July 2023, Perugia announced the termination of Casasola's contract by mutual agreement.

=== Ternana ===
On 8 August 2023, Casasola signed a two-year contract with Ternana in Serie B.

== International career ==
Casasola was a member of the Argentina U20 squad for the 2015 FIFA U-20 World Cup and the 2015 South American Youth Football Championship.

== Club career statistics ==
Club performance			League		Cup		League Cup		Continental		Total	
Season	Club	League	Apps	Goals	Apps	Goals	Apps	Goals	Apps	Goals	Apps	Goals
England			League		FA Cup		EFL Cup		Europe		Total	
2014–15	Fulham	Football League Championship	0	0	0	0	0	0	—		0	0
Italy			League		Coppa Italia		—		Europe		Total	
2015–16	Como	Serie B	27	0	0	0	—		—		27	0
2016–17	Trapani	Serie B	15	0	2	0	—		—		17	0
Total	England		0	0	0	0	0	0	0	0	0	0
Total	Italy		42	0	2	0	—		0	0	44	0
Total	Career total		42	0	2	0	0	0	0	0	44	0

== Honours ==
=== International ===
Argentina U20

Winner

- South American Youth Football Championship(1): 2015

== Private ==
His sister Micaela Casasola is a handball player for the Argentina women's national handball team.
