= Marius Adamonis =

Lithuanian footballer (born 1997)

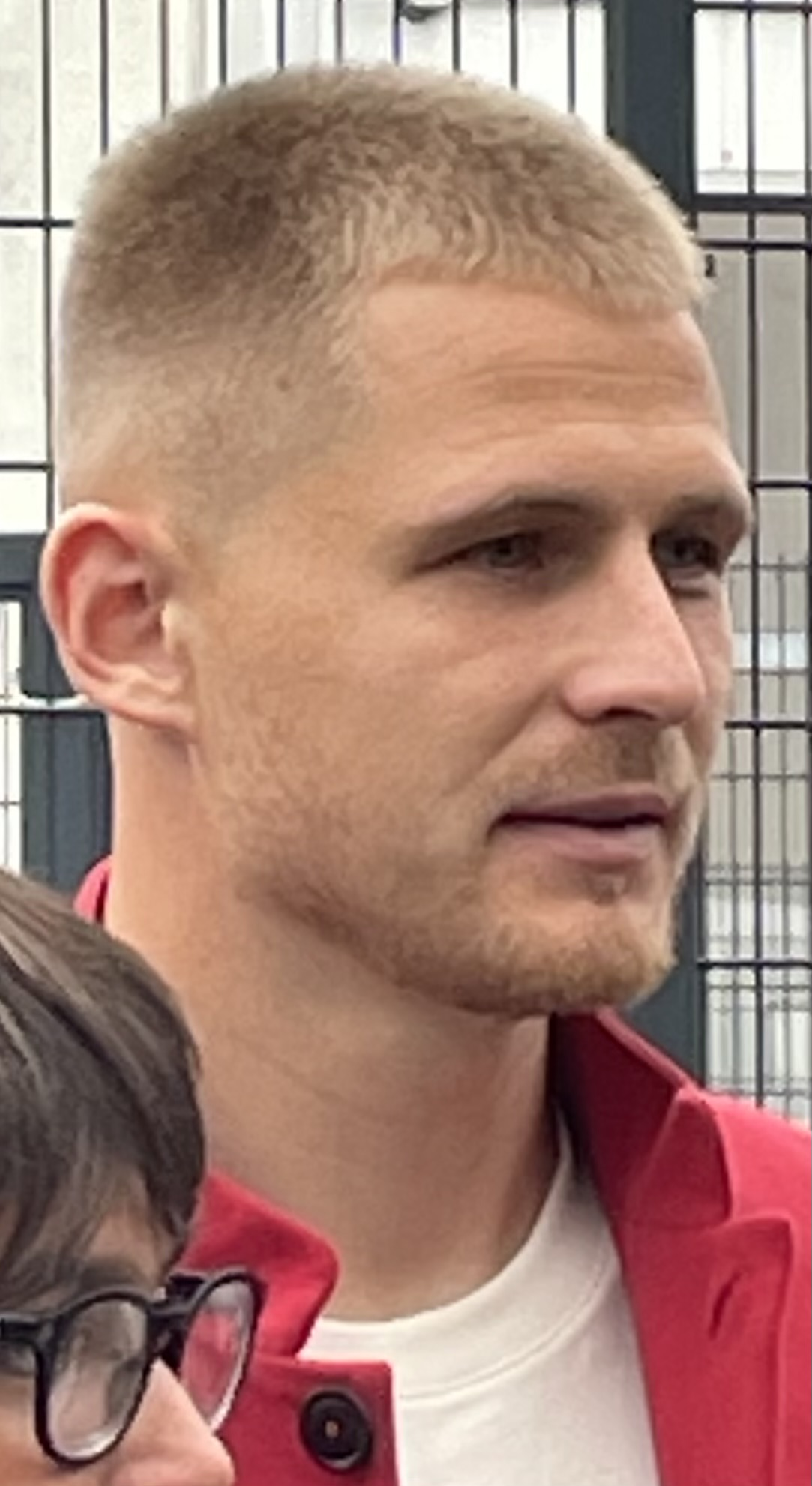

Personal information
- Date of birth: 13 May 1997 (age 29)
- Place of birth: Panevėžys, Lithuania
- Height: 1.93 m (6 ft 4 in)
- Position: Goalkeeper

Team information
- Current team: FK Žalgiris

Youth career
- –2014: Panevėžio FA
- 2015–2016: Atlantas
- 2016: → Bournemouth (loan)
- 2016–2017: Lazio

Senior career*
Years	Team	Apps	(Gls)
2015	Atlantas	2	(0)
2016	Atlantas	6	(0)
2017–2024	Lazio	0	(0)
2017–2018	→ Salernitana (loan)	7	(0)
2018–2019	→ Casertana (loan)	24	(0)
2019–2020	→ Catanzaro (loan)	0	(0)
2020	→ Sicula Leonzio (loan)	10	(0)
2020–2021	→ Salernitana (loan)	3	(0)
2023–2024	→ Perugia (loan)	36	(0)
2024–2025	Catania	10	(0)
2025	→ Südtirol (loan)	15	(0)
2025–2026	Südtirol	34	(0)
2026–	Žalgiris	0	(0)

International career^{‡}
2013	Lithuania U17	8	(0)
2015	Lithuania U18	5	(0)
2015	Lithuania U19	6	(0)
2017–2018	Lithuania U21	4	(0)
2022–	Lithuania	1	(0)
- * Club domestic league appearances and goals as of 1 September 2026 ‡ National team caps and goals as of 19 November 2022

Marius Adamonis (born 13 May 1997) is a Lithuanian professional footballer who plays as a goalkeeper.

== Club career ==
He made his Serie B debut for Salernitana on 7 October 2017 in a game against Ascoli.

On 31 July 2019, he joined Catanzaro in Serie C on a season-long loan.

On 17 January 2020, he moved on a new loan to Sicula Leonzio.

On 5 October 2020, he returned to Salernitana on another loan.

On 30 August 2023, he joined Perugia on a season-long loan.

On 29 June 2024, he joined Catania FC on permanent basis. On 9 January 2025, Adamonis moved on loan to Südtirol, with an obligation to make the transfer permanent if Südtirol avoids relegation.

== International ==
He was first called up to the senior Lithuania national football team in June 2019 for the 2020 Euro qualifiers against Luxembourg and Serbia, but remained on the bench behind Džiugas Bartkus.

He made his debut during the friendly match against Estonia in November 2022.
