= Emanuele Cicerelli =

Italian football player (born 1994)

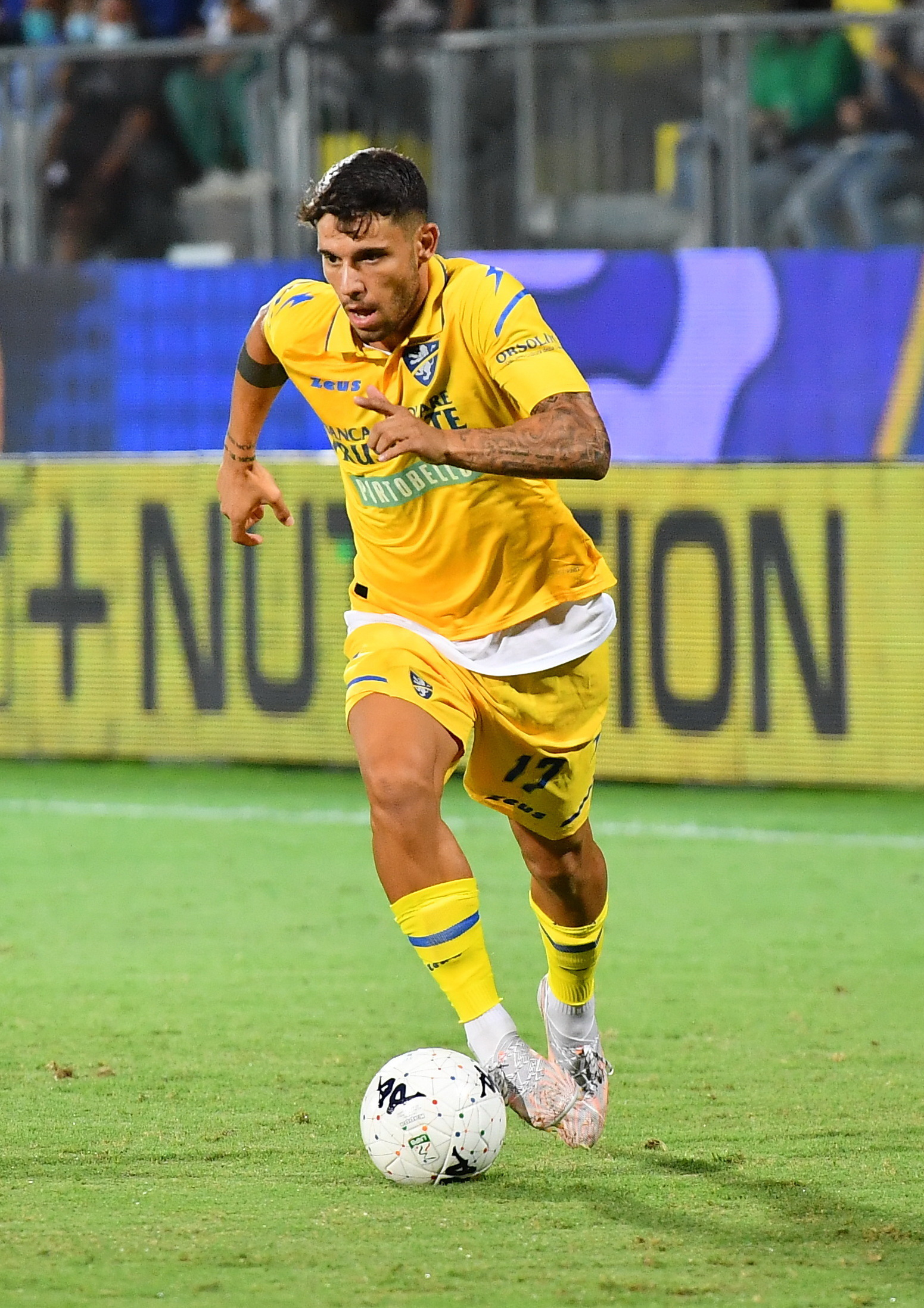

Personal information
- Full name: Emmanuele Pio Cicerelli
- Date of birth: 12 August 1994 (age 32)
- Place of birth: San Giovanni Rotondo, Italy
- Height: 1.77 m (5 ft 10 in)
- Positions: Winger; midfielder

Team information
- Current team: Catania
- Number: 10

Youth career
- –2012: Foggia
- 2012–2013: Barletta

Senior career*
Years	Team	Apps	(Gls)
2012	Foggia	0	(0)
2013–2015	Barletta	35	(3)
2014–2015	→ Aversa Normanna (loan)	17	(2)
2015	→ Melfi (loan)	1	(0)
2015–2017	Paganese	64	(8)
2017–2020	Salernitana	19	(0)
2018	→ Pordenone (loan)	11	(0)
2018–2019	→ Foggia (loan)	22	(2)
2020–2024	Lazio	0	(0)
2020–2021	→ Salernitana (loan)	41	(2)
2021–2022	→ Frosinone (loan)	31	(3)
2022–2023	→ Reggina (loan)	29	(0)
2024–	Catania	39	(7)
2024–2025	→ Ternana (loan)	37	(19)
- * Club domestic league appearances and goals as of 1 April 2026

Emanuele Pio Cicerelli (born 12 August 1994) is an Italian professional footballer who plays as a winger and midfielder for Serie C Group C club Catania.

== Club career ==
He made his Serie C debut for Barletta on 17 March 2013 in a game against Andria BAT.

On 31 January 2020, his rights were sold to Lazio, who loaned him back to Salernitana.

On 31 August 2021, he joined Frosinone on loan.

On 27 July 2022, Cicerelli was loaned to Reggina, with a conditional obligation to buy.

On 27 July 2024, Cicerelli joined Ternana on loan with an obligation to buy.

After the end of the loan, in August 2025, Cicerelli extended his contract with Catania until June 30, 2027.
