= Stadio Arechi =

Stadium in Salerno, Italy

Coordinates: 40°38′42″N 14°49′26″E

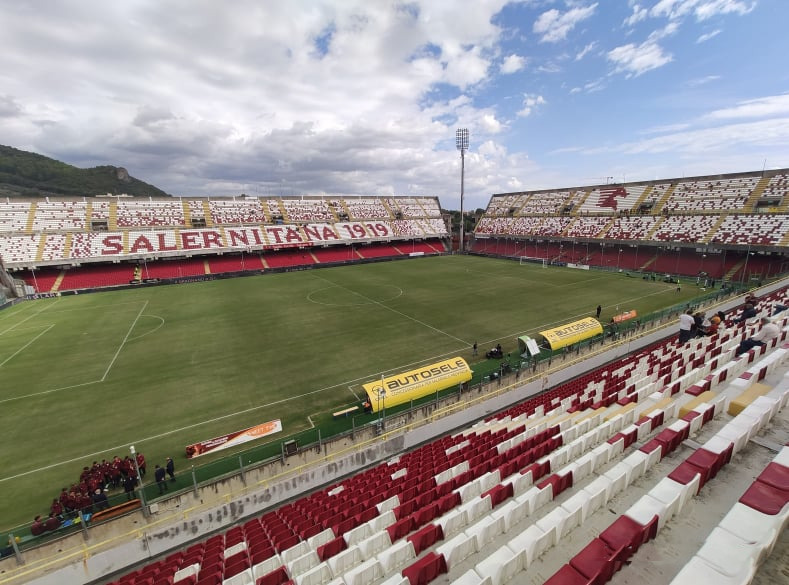
- Salernitana's Stadio Arechi in 2019
- Interactive map of Stadio Arechi
- Address: Piazzale Gipo Viani
- Location: Salerno, Italy
- Owner: Municipality of Salerno
- Capacity: 31,300
- Surface: Grass
- Field size: 114.83 by 74.36 yards (105.00 by 67.99 m)

Construction
- Opened: 1990
- Renovated: 1998

Tenants
- Salernitana (1990–present); Italy national football team (selected matches)

The Arechi Stadium is a multi-purpose stadium in Salerno, Italy. It is currently used mostly for football matches and is the home stadium of U.S. Salernitana 1919. The stadium holds 31,300. It was opened in 1990, replacing the Donato Vestuti stadium, which had become no longer fit to host the rapidly growing audience of the team. The Italy national football team has played at the stadium three times.
