= List of outfield association footballers who played in goal =

A relatively small number of outfield association footballers have played in goal during a match, usually due to the injury, dismissal or other unavailability of the usual goalkeeper.

== List of players ==
| Date | Name | Team | Time played (incl. stoppage time) | Details |
|---|---|---|---|---|
| 6 March 1875 | Alexander Bonsor | England | 15 minutes | England goalkeeper William Carr arrived late for a friendly match against Scotland due to a train delay. Bonsor, a forward, played in goal for the opening 15 minutes of the match, in which England began with only 10 men, and kept a clean sheet. |
| 18 January 1902 | John McPherson | Rangers | | Regular goalkeeper Matthew Dickie was injured and veteran international forward McPherson went in goal in a 1901–02 Scottish Division One fixture against St Mirren that Rangers had to win to claim the title, which they did by a 3–2 score. |
| 4 January 1908 | Robert Barton | Kilmarnock | 45 minutes | Due to fog, four Kilmarnock players were unable to make it to Port Glasgow in time for their match against Port Glasgow Athletic in January 1908, even after the referee had delayed kick-off by 25 minutes. With just seven players and no recognised goalkeeper, Bill Shaw was placed between the sticks in the first half before Robert Barton took over in the second half. Despite the disadvantage, Kilmarnock only lost 4–1 as they set a record for the smallest number of players to start and finish a first class match. |
| 4 January 1908 | Bill Shaw | Kilmarnock | 45 minutes | |
| 2 April 1915 | John King | Newcastle United | Full match | Regular goalkeeper Bill Mellor was injured pre-match and forward King went in goal for the entirety of a 1914–15 Football League fixture against Tottenham Hotspur, keeping a clean sheet in a 0–0 draw. |
| 11 December 1920 | James McAlpine | Queen's Park | | Leading 2–0 at Hampden Park against Hibernian, McAlpine (scorer of both goals, who had also gone in goal on previous occasions) replaced regular goalkeeper William Gould who had been injured, and kept a clean sheet for the short-handed team (no substitutes being allowed at the time). |
| 19 September 1925 | Bobby Templeton | Hibernian | | Defender Templeton took over as Hibs' manager in 1925, still occasionally playing in emergencies. At least two of these occasions were as goalkeeper, losing 4–3 to Partick Thistle in his first season but playing his part in a 3–2 win over Celtic in his second. |
| 2 February 1927 | Bobby Templeton | Hibernian | | Defender Templeton took over as Hibs' manager in 1925, still occasionally playing in emergencies. At least two of these occasions were as goalkeeper, losing 4–3 to Partick Thistle in his first season but playing his part in a 3–2 win over Celtic in his second. |
| 16 April 1927 | Charlie McCormack | Hamilton Academical | | In a Scottish League match against champions-elect Rangers at Douglas Park, Hamilton goalkeeper Alex Binnie suffered a broken leg and defender McCormack took over. His team were awarded a penalty, which he scored, and the opposition then missed a penalty of their own. Rangers eventually equalised, but McCormack made several saves and the Accies held out for a draw. |
| 22 October 1927 | Jack Ball | England | 45 minutes+ (Note: Info on added stoppage time, if any, is not currently known.) | Ball, a forward, played in goal for the second half of the 1927–28 British Home Championship match against the IFA national team, conceding one goal. He replaced goalkeeper Ted Hufton, who had broken his arm in the 20th minute but continued playing until he was taken to the hospital at half-time. |
| 1 May 1931 | Luisinho | São Paulo | | After a tragic injury to goalkeeper Nestor, who had to end his career, Luisinho ended the match against Palestra Itália (Palmeiras) as goalkeeper. With São Paulo having 2 players sent off, they ended up conceding the goal of the 3–2 defeat |
| 23 December 1933 | Eddie Hapgood | Arsenal | | At Bramall Lane against Sheffield United, Hapgood replaced regular goalkeeper, Frank Moss, who had dislocated his fingers. |
| 16 March 1935 | Eddie Hapgood | Arsenal | | Against Everton at Goodison Park, Hapgood again replaced Moss after the latter had injured his shoulder. After treatment, Moss returned to the pitch as an outfield player and scored in a 2–0 win. |
| 30 April 1937 | Willie Buchan | Celtic | | Celtic were already 4–0 down to Motherwell at Fir Park when goalkeeper Joe Kennaway had to come off. Forward Buchan (scorer of the winning goal in the 1937 Scottish Cup final a week earlier) took over, conceding four more goals, all to Alex Stewart, whose total haul was six; the 8–0 result is Celtic's all-time record defeat. |
| 20 June 1937 | Cozinheiro | São Paulo | | Ended the match against São Paulo Railway as a goalkeeper, after King was sent off. |
| 1 December 1940 | Jacinto Quincoces | Real Madrid | | On 1 December 1940, during El Clásico match between Real Madrid and Barcelona at Camp de Les Corts, Spanish defender Jacinto Quincoces was forced to take over as goalkeeper in the 77th minute after the team's regular keeper, Enrique Esquiva, suffered a back injury following a collision with both Quincoces and Barcelona forward Julián Vergara. With no substitutions allowed at the time, Quincoces stepped into goal for the remainder of the match. Despite being a central defender, he made two notable saves, preventing further goals. The match ended in a 3–0 victory for Barcelona. |
| 15 March 1947 | Neil McBain | New Brighton | Full match | An injury crisis left New Brighton manager McBain without a goalkeeper against Hartlepool United so the 51-year old, a half-back in his playing days, selected himself, setting a record for the oldest player in the English Football League; New Brighton lost 3–0. |
| 16 April 1947 | Rui | São Paulo | | After injury to goalkeeper Gijo, Rui had the inglorious mission to go to the goal. It ended up taking 4 goals from Corinthians, which was one of the biggest defeats suffered by São Paulo in Majestoso. |
| 31 July 1949 | Alfredo Di Stéfano | River Plate | | Di Stéfano played in the role of goalkeeper replacing the owner Amadeo Carrizo for a few minutes and keeping the clean sheet in a derby won against Boca Juniors. |
| 4 May 1957 | Jackie Blanchflower | Manchester United | | Blanchflower covered in goal in the 1957 FA Cup Final while Ray Wood received treatment for an injury suffered in a collision with Peter McParland, who scored both of Aston Villa's goals as United lost 2–1. |
| 1 October 1958 | Alex Wright | Partick Thistle | | In the semi-final of the 1958–59 Scottish League Cup against holders Celtic, goalkeeper Tom Ledgerwood injured an arm early in the second half and Wright took over. He did not concede a goal until the 88th minute and Partick Thistle won 2–1 to reach the final. |
| 23 August 1958 | Bobby Shearer | Rangers | | Defender Shearer deputised as goalkeeper (at least) twice, both times against Hearts at Tynecastle Park, first taking over from Norrie Martin in a League Cup fixture in 1958 which Hearts won 2–1, and later in place of the injured Billy Ritchie for 82 minutes of a 3–1 Rangers victory in 1960. |
| 26 October 1960 | Bobby Shearer | Rangers | | Defender Shearer deputised as goalkeeper (at least) twice, both times against Hearts at Tynecastle Park, first taking over from Norrie Martin in a League Cup fixture in 1958 which Hearts won 2–1, and later in place of the injured Billy Ritchie for 82 minutes of a 3–1 Rangers victory in 1960. |
| 16 January 1961 | Alex Dawson | Manchester United | | Centre-forward Dawson swapped places with an injured Harry Gregg in goal in the first-half against champions-elect Tottenham Hotspur and became one of only two players to keep a clean sheet against Spurs that season, whilst Gregg managed to claim an assist with a backheeled pass to Mark Pearson at the other end. |
| 23 April 1962 | Martin Peters | West Ham United | | In only his third game for West Ham, Peters went in goal in an away game with Cardiff City after regular goalkeeper Brian Rhodes was injured. |
| 2 April 1963 | Willie Wallace | Heart of Midlothian | 78 minutes+ | With 12 minutes gone and no score, Hearts goalkeeper Gordon Marshall was seriously injured and carried off; forward Wallace took over. Playing against 10 men and a stand-in keeper, St Mirren won 7–3 with Don Kerrigan's four goals and Bobby Carroll's hat trick. |
| 19 January 1964 | Pelé | Santos | | In the second leg of the semi-finals of the 1963 Taça Brasil, Santos defeated Grêmio 4–3. After scoring a hat trick, Pelé successfully defended the Santos goal after goalkeeper Gilmar was dismissed. |
| 20 October 1965 | Gerd Müller | Bayern Munich | | After scoring the second goal of the match against Hamburger SV (which finished as a 4–0 win), Gerd Müller temporarily played in goal and did not concede while Sepp Maier was treated for a knee injury. |
| December 1971 | David Webb | Chelsea | | Peter Bonetti picked up an injury against Coventry City and defender David Webb took his place in goal. Webb performed so well that with reserve goalkeepers John Phillips and Steve Sherwood unavailable – Phillips was injured and Sherwood was stuck in traffic on the M1 – he started the next game and went on to keep a clean sheet in a 2–0 home win over Ipswich Town. |
| 26 January 1972 | Bobby Moore | West Ham United | | England's World Cup-winning captain stood in goal following an injury to Bobby Ferguson in the League Cup semi-finals, and saved a penalty from Mike Bernard, though Bernard scored from the resulting rebound and Stoke City went on to win the game and reach the final. |
| 25 November 1978 | Kenny Hibbitt | Wolverhampton Wanderers | | Midfielder Kenny Hibbitt took over in goal from keeper Paul Bradshaw when Wolves played Tottenham Hotspur in a First Division match in November 1978. Spurs won 1–0. |
| January 1980 | Glenn Hoddle | Tottenham Hotspur | | Hoddle played in goal for Spurs three times and remained unbeaten in all three games. Perhaps the most notable of these fixtures was against Manchester United away in a FA Cup 5th round replay, where he kept a clean sheet into extra-time, before Osvaldo Ardiles won the game for Spurs. |
| 6 March 1982 | Steve Lynex | Leicester City | | Mark Wallington was taken off midway through an FA Cup quarter-final with Shrewsbury Town following a challenge from Chic Bates. Young stepped in goal but was himself knocked unconscious after a collision with Bernard McNally and so Lynex went in goal whilst Young recovered his senses on the sidelines. Young went back in goal and Leicester won the game 5–2. |
| 6 March 1982 | Alan Young | Leicester City | | Mark Wallington was taken off midway through an FA Cup quarter-final with Shrewsbury Town following a challenge from Chic Bates. Young stepped in goal but was himself knocked unconscious after a collision with Bernard McNally and so Lynex went in goal whilst Young recovered his senses on the sidelines. Young went back in goal and Leicester won the game 5–2. |
| 7 May 1982 | Alain Giresse | Bordeaux | 60 minutes+ | Club president Claude Bez decided to protest against the French Football Federation for issuing a one-year ban on regular goalkeeper Dragan Pantelić for kicking a linesman, so he put Giresse in goal for the final league game of the season against Nantes. As part of the protest, Giresse was not actually named as a goalkeeper, so he was not permitted to use his hands. He conceded five goals in the opening sixty minutes before being replaced by Marius Trésor. |
| 7 May 1982 | Marius Trésor | Bordeaux | 30 minutes+ | Club president Claude Bez decided to protest against the French Football Federation for issuing a one-year ban on regular goalkeeper Dragan Pantelić for kicking a linesman, so he put Giresse in goal for the final league game of the season against Nantes. As part of the protest, Giresse was not actually named as a goalkeeper, so he was not permitted to use his hands. He conceded five goals in the opening sixty minutes before being replaced by Marius Trésor. |
| 30 April 1983 | Paul Hegarty | Dundee United | | During a league match away to Morton, United goalkeeper Hamish McAlpine suffered a hip injury. He carried on playing until United were 3–0 ahead, when he was replaced in goal by defender Hegarty. United went on to win 4–0 and won the league championship that season. |
| 11 May 1985 | Sandy Jardine | Heart of Midlothian | 31 minutes+ | In a league match away to St Mirren, Hearts goalkeeper Henry Smith slipped and injured himself prior to the match, but decided to play and lasted until the 59th minute, when veteran defender Jardine had to take over with Hearts already behind; St Mirren won 5–2. |
| 21 April 1986 | Chris Hedworth | Newcastle United | | With regular number one Martin Thomas leaving the pitch injured, both Chris Hedworth and Peter Beardsley played in goal at West Ham United. Hedworth conceded one before he himself had to leave the pitch injured, with Beardsley then donning the gloves. Thomas, Hedworth and Beardsley conceded one goal each to Alvin Martin, though West Ham scored another five to make the final score 8–1. |
| 21 April 1986 | Peter Beardsley | Newcastle United | | With regular number one Martin Thomas leaving the pitch injured, both Chris Hedworth and Peter Beardsley played in goal at West Ham United. Hedworth conceded one before he himself had to leave the pitch injured, with Beardsley then donning the gloves. Thomas, Hedworth and Beardsley conceded one goal each to Alvin Martin, though West Ham scored another five to make the final score 8–1. |
| 26 August 1987 | Paul Haylock | Gillingham | | Haylock took over in goal when Phil Kite was sent off during the first half of a League Cup tie. He saved a penalty during the penalty shoot-out. |
| 17 October 1987 | Graham Roberts | Rangers | | During an Old Firm match against Celtic, Rangers goalkeeper Chris Woods was sent off in the first half along with opponent Frank McAvennie. Roberts took over in goal and conceded twice. Rangers then had Terry Butcher sent off but they fought back to make the final score 2–2. Roberts was observed apparently 'conducting' the home fans in sectarian chants. The four players were charged with a breach of the peace and appeared at court; Roberts was found not proven. |
| 31 October 1987 | Kenny McDowall | St Mirren | | In a league match away to Dundee United, goalkeeper Campbell Money was injured and McDowall took his place for around an hour. He was at fault for the goal he conceded, but St Mirren came from behind to win 3–2. |
| 17 November 1988 | Gaúcho | Palmeiras | | During a 1988 Campeonato Brasileiro Série A match against Flamengo, he was selected as replacement goalkeeper after Zetti suffered an injury. The match ended 1-1 after regular time; during the penalty shootout Gaúcho saved two Flamengo penalties, and Palmeiras won 5-4. |
| 1 January 1990 | David Hirst | Sheffield Wednesday | 10 minutes+ | In a Football League First Division match against Manchester City at home, goalkeeper Kevin Pressman was injured in the 80th minute, and he was replaced by David Hurst, who kept a clean sheet until the end of the match, and he also managed to score a goal in the match before that. |
| 20 April 1991 | Niall Quinn | Manchester City | | City beat Derby County 2–1, with Quinn scoring a goal before he replaced the dismissed goalkeeper Tony Coton in goal: he went on to save a penalty from Dean Saunders. |
| 23 November 1991 | Brian Irvine | Aberdeen | | Irvine had to take over for Theo Snelders, who was dismissed for violent conduct after conceding a penalty in an away fixture at Hibernian. Irvine saved the kick from Pat McGinlay, but Aberdeen missed a penalty of their own; Hibernian scored in the last minute to win 1–0. |
| 26 January 1992 | Míchel | Real Madrid | | After Paco Buyo was sent off, Míchel took over as goalkeeper for a few seconds at the end of the match in Real Madrid's 2–1 victory against Tenerife. |
| 11 April 1992 | Joe Dunne | Gillingham | | Gillingham had already had David Crown dismissed when their goalkeeper Harvey Lim was sent off along with Blackpool's Andy Garner for fighting. Dunne was placed in goal, with manager Damien Richardson saying that his experience from playing gaelic football while growing up in Ireland would give him handling experience. Gillingham won the match 3–2, having been 2–1 up at the time Lim was sent off. |
| 22 October 1992 | David Burrows | Liverpool | | Liverpool goalkeeper Bruce Grobbelaar had an erratic game and was eventually sent off whilst giving away a penalty in a UEFA Cup Winners' Cup match with Spartak Moscow. Burrows failed to save the penalty and the Russian side went on to win the tie 6–2 on aggregate. |
| 6 April 1993 | Gareth Ainsworth | Preston North End | 13 minutes+ | Simon Farnworth was knocked unconscious on 77 minutes at Port Vale and Ainsworth conceded one goal as Preston held out for a 2–2 draw. |
| 17 April 1993 | Ian Baird | Heart of Midlothian | Full match | Goalkeeper Nicky Walker pulled a calf muscle in the warm-up at Aberdeen and manager Joe Jordan was forced to ask for a volunteer in the matchday squad to play in goal. Baird volunteered, having also played 20 minutes in goal for Leeds United earlier in his career, and Hearts lost the game 3–2. |
| 16 October 1993 | Roy McDonough | Colchester United | | McDonough took over after John Keeley was sent off two minutes before half-time against Hereford United. He was replaced at half-time by substitute goalkeeper Nathan Munson, but McDonough took over again later in the game after Munson was also sent off. Hereford's Chris Pike scored a goal past each of the three goalkeepers. |
| 8 June 1995 | Mia Hamm | United States | 10 minutes | Hamm took over after goalkeeper Briana Scurry was sent off for handling the ball outside the penalty area during a World Cup match against Denmark. |
| 23 August 1995 | Oceano Cruz | Sporting CP | | Captain Cruz deputised in goal for the final eight minutes of the 1995 Supertaça Cândido de Oliveira second leg against rivals Porto, following a red card for Paulo Costinha. Despite conceding a penalty earlier in the game, Cruz kept a clean sheet, allowing the tie to be replayed on 30 April 1996. Sporting won the resulting replay 3–0 at the Parc des Princes in Paris. |
| 21 October 1995 | Vinnie Jones | Wimbledon | | A sending off to Paul Heald with all three substitutions used meant that Jones volunteered to keep goal for the "crazy gang" in the remainder of the game at Newcastle United. Jones played enthusiastically and competently but conceded three goals as Newcastle ran the game out as 6–1 winners. |
| 19 December 1995 | Julian Dicks | West Ham United | | Dicks took over in goal after regular 'keeper Luděk Mikloško had been sent off for a foul on Daniel Amokachi. He let in two goals as Everton won 3–0 and was named Man of the Match. |
| 17 April 1996 | Lucas Radebe | Leeds United | | Radebe stood in after Mark Beeney was sent off against Manchester United in the 17th-minute and came close to keeping a clean sheet at Old Trafford before Roy Keane scored the only goal of the game on 73 minutes. Radebe had also replaced John Lukic in goal after the goalkeeper suffered a concussion against Middlesbrough the previous month. |
| 11 September 1996 | Andrey Tikhonov | Spartak Moscow | | In a UEFA Cup match against Silkeborg, goalkeeper Ruslan Nigmatullin was sent off in the 89th minute for handling the ball outside the box. With no substitutions left, Tikhonov replaced him in goal for the final minutes and saved the resulting free kick. |
| 29 October 1996 | John McGinlay | Bolton Wanderers | | |
| 11 May 1997 | Andy Booth | Sheffield Wednesday | 7 minutes+ | In the last day of the 1996–97 FA Premier League season in a match between Sheffield Wednesday and Liverpool, goalkeeper Kevin Pressman went off injured in the first half, forcing substitute goalkeeper Matt Clarke to take his place, but he was sent off in the 83rd minute for handling the ball outside the box. With no other options, striker Andy Booth replaced Clarke in goal for the final minutes, but couldn't save the resulting free kick from Jamie Redknapp. The match finished 1–1. |
| 27 April 1999 | Scott Fitzgerald | Millwall | 68 minutes+ | Fitzgerald took over from Ben Roberts in a game against Bristol Rovers in the 22nd minute after Roberts was sent off. Rovers won 3-0. |
| 23 May 1999 | Jamie Harnwell | Perth Glory | | Tony Franken was sent off in the 85th minute of a National Soccer League preliminary final against Sydney United. With all of Perth's substitutions already used, Harnwell played in goal for the final minutes of the 2–1 loss. |
| 18 September 1999 | Michael Tarnat | Bayern Munich | | Oliver Kahn had to be substituted following a collision with teammate Samuel Kuffour, but backup goalkeeper Bernd Dreher would last only two minutes before having to leave the field with a twisted knee. Tarnat went in goal and helped Bayern to a 2–1 win against Eintracht Frankfurt. |
| 10 May 2000 | Juliano Belletti | São Paulo | | Played on the goal in the last minutes of the match against Santos, after the goalkeeper Rogério Ceni was sent off. |
| 13 May 2000 | Michael Schjønberg | Kaiserslautern | 45 minutes+ | Schjønberg made a memorable appearance in the penultimate match of the 1999–2000 season. In the game against SC Freiburg, first-choice goalkeeper Georg Koch was injured and the substitute goalkeeper Uwe Gospodarek replaced him. By the half-time break, Gospodarek had suffered an injury of his own, and with no more goalkeepers selected for the match squad, Schjønberg took over the keeper's gloves. In the 59th minute, Levan Kobiashvili scored against Schjønberg to give SC Freiburg a 2–1 lead, but Schjønberg otherwise kept his sheet clean. He crowned his achievement with a saved penalty kick, when he held the shot from Alexander Iashvili in the 84th minute. |
| 27 May 2000 | Robbie Winters | Aberdeen | 100 minutes | In the final of the Scottish Cup against Rangers at Hampden Park, Aberdeen goalkeeper Jim Leighton, playing in his last-ever match, was substituted two minutes in after suffering a broken jaw in a challenge from Rod Wallace, which required the insertion of metal plates into his face. With Aberdeen having chosen not to put a substitute goalkeeper on the bench, forward Winters took over in goal; Rangers won 4–0. |
| 28 April 2002 | Martín Demichelis | River Plate | | Demichelis was forced to play the last minutes of the match against Racing as goalkeeper, following the expulsion of Ángel Comizzo. |
| 10 September 2002 | Marcus Browning | Bournemouth | | Browning took over the goalkeeper's gloves following an injury to Chris Tardif in the 66th minute of a League Cup first round tie against Brentford. Bournemouth had a 3–2 lead when Browning went in goal but Brentford equalised to send the game to a penalty shootout, which Brentford won 4–2. |
| 9 November 2002 | Jan Koller | Borussia Dortmund | | A red card for Jens Lehmann against Bayern Munich with Dortmund manager Matthias Sammer already having used all three substitutions left the 2.02 m (6 ft 7 1/2 in)-tall Koller to fill in as goalkeeper for the last 24 minutes. Dortmund lost the match but Koller did not concede any goals, and German magazine Kicker named him as the goalkeeper in their team of the week. |
| 21 December 2002 | Marcus Browning | Bournemouth | | For the second time in four months, Browning replaced Chris Tardif after the latter suffered an injury in the 14th minute of a Third Division match against Hull City, keeping a clean sheet in a goalless draw. |
| 11 May 2003 | Graham McLaren | East Stirlingshire | 12 minutes | McLaren was the third player for his team to go in goal on the last day of the season. After the starting goalkeeper was injured after seven minutes and the backup goalkeeper was sent off in the 53rd minute, he was then shown a red card in the 65th minute for a foul which resulted in a penalty. McCann took over and saved the kick, though East Stirlingshire lost 3–1 to Albion Rovers. |
| 11 May 2003 | Kevin McCann | East Stirlingshire | | McLaren was the third player for his team to go in goal on the last day of the season. After the starting goalkeeper was injured after seven minutes and the backup goalkeeper was sent off in the 53rd minute, he was then shown a red card in the 65th minute for a foul which resulted in a penalty. McCann took over and saved the kick, though East Stirlingshire lost 3–1 to Albion Rovers. |
| 24 July 2003 | Gustavo Nery | São Paulo | | Played on the goal in the last minutes of the match against Ponte Preta, after the goalkeeper Rogério Ceni was sent off. Nery conceded the losing goal in the last minutes. |
| 17 April 2005 | Daniel Pancu | Beşiktaş | | Following Beşiktaş' use of all three substitutions against rivals Fenerbahçe, Pancu stepped in for Óscar Córdoba, who was sent off with ten minutes remaining, conceding a penalty in the process in the 2004–05 Süper Lig. Alex converted the resulting penalty to level the scores at 3–3, though Beşiktaş won 4–3, thanks to a last minute goal from Koray Avcı. |
| 7 May 2005 | Lee Peacock | Sheffield Wednesday | | During a home game vs Bristol City, Paul Gallacher was dismissed for denying a goalscoring opportunity. As there were no reserve keepers on Wednesday's bench, Lee Peacock went into goal to defend the ensuing penalty; Luke Wilkshire scored the game-winning goal. |
| 20 August 2005 | Mark Phillips | Millwall | | Defender Mark Phillips went in goal for Millwall after goalkeeper Andy Marshall was sent off in the first half during a league game against Reading. Millwall were 4-0 down by half-time when Canada international Adrian Serioux took over in goal for the second half. Reading scored once more to record a 5-0 victory. |
| 20 August 2005 | Adrian Serioux | Millwall | | Defender Mark Phillips went in goal for Millwall after goalkeeper Andy Marshall was sent off in the first half during a league game against Reading. Millwall were 4-0 down by half-time when Canada international Adrian Serioux took over in goal for the second half. Reading scored once more to record a 5-0 victory. |
| 14 May 2006 | Amy McDonald | Kilmarnock Ladies | | In the Scottish Women's Premier League Cup final against Glasgow City, McDonald scored in the first half and deputised as goalkeeper for the entire second half due to an injury, keeping a clean sheet as her team won 3–2. |
| 28 September 2006 | Milan Biševac Petrić | Crvena zvezzda | | After Ivan Ranđelovic was injured in 78. minutes, Biševac played as goalkeeper in the UEFA cup match against Slovan Liberec and saved the net. |
| 14 October 2006 | John Terry | Chelsea | | Back-up goalkeeper Carlo Cudicini came on for Petr Čech following a collision in the opening stages against Reading. Cudicini himself was then knocked unconscious in the final moments of the game, leaving Terry to take over in goal and successfully hold out for a 1–0 win. |
| 26 October 2006 | Ulrich Le Pen | FC Lorient | 66 minutes | Starting goalkeeper Fabian Audard got injured after 9 minutes. Substitute Lionel Cappone then got a red card. Ulrich Le Pen finished the game with a clean sheet, 0-0. |
| 23 November 2006 | Mladen Petrić | FC Basel | | After Franco Costanzo was sent off, Petrić played as goalkeeper in stoppage time of the UEFA Cup match against AS Nancy and saved the resulting penalty. |
| 30 December 2006 | Phil Jagielka | Sheffield United | | Jagielka impressed manager Neil Warnock playing in goal during training to the extent that Warnock would not see the need to put a goalkeeper on the bench. Regular goalkeeper Paddy Kenny was injured or sent off on four occasions, leaving Jagielka to take his place in goal. In one of these games, he produced a fingertip save to deny Arsenal's Robin van Persie. |
| 4 February 2007 | John O'Shea | Manchester United | 9 minutes | O'Shea replaced Edwin van der Sar in goal against Tottenham Hotspur after the latter came off following a broken nose. He kept a clean sheet and Manchester United won 4–0. |
| 8 July 2007 | Jonathan Beaulieu-Bourgault | Canada U-20 | | Beaulieu-Bourgault replaced Asmir Begović, who was sent off for handling the ball outside of the box in a U-20 World Cup match. Canada had already used its three substitutions, requiring the outfield player to take the position. He kept a clean sheet for the 15 minutes he played. |
| 20 October 2007 | Bobô | Beşiktaş | 10 minutes+ | Beşiktaş goalkeeper Rüştü Reçber was sent-off for handling outside of the penalty area in the 79th minute, and Bobô replaced him until the end of the match. He made several saves, helping Beşiktaş secure a vital away victory. |
| 8 December 2007 | Paraskevas Andralas | Levadiakos | | Prior to playing as an outfield player, Andralas had played as a goalkeeper in his teenage years. In a 4–0 loss against Super League Greece champions Olympiacos, regular goalkeeper Nikos Karakostas was sent off with nine minutes remaining after fouling Luciano Galletti in the box. Andralas saved Anastasios Pantos' resulting penalty. |
| 13 December 2007 | Stef Curtis | Bristol Academy | Full match | Curtis played the full 90 minutes in goal in a FA Women's Premier League game against Arsenal due to the only goalkeeper in the squad being injured. She conceded just a single goal against the eventual league champions. |
| 9 March 2008 | Rio Ferdinand | Manchester United | 18 minutes | Edwin van der Sar left the FA Cup quarter-final match against Portsmouth at half-time following a hamstring injury and was replaced by substitute Tomasz Kuszczak, who later got sent off after conceding a penalty. Ferdinand took over in goal but could not prevent Portsmouth from scoring the penalty, the only goal of the game. |
| 26 April 2008 | Edmundo | Vasco da Gama | | In a match against Cruzeiro, at minute 73, after the sending off Tiago, who as committed a penalty in Guilherme. Vasco had made all the substitutions, and Edmundo goes to the goal. Guilherme himself hits the penalty kick and scored. Edmundo, one of the biggest names in Vasco da Gama history, cried at the end of the match. |
| 15 June 2008 | Tuncay Şanlı | Turkey | | In the last match of UEFA Euro 2008 Group A, Turkish goalkeeper Volkan Demirel was sent off after pushing Jan Koller in the second of the four minutes added time. Turkey was leading the match 3-2 after a late comeback with three goals. They could advance to quarter-finals as it stands yet Czech Republic could bring it to a penalty shootout by scoring one or even advance with a win by scoring two goals. Winger Tuncay Şanlı took over the goal as Turkey had made all the substitutions and they managed to keep the scoreline 3-2 until the referee blow his last whistle at 90+6. |
| 21 October 2008 | Alan Tate | Swansea City | 72 minutes | Swansea City goalkeeper Dorus de Vries broke his jaw in the 26th minute of an EFL Championship match against Queens Park Rangers. Roberto Martinez had failed to select a goalkeeper among the substitutes, so Alan Tate assumed responsibilities for the remainder of the match. Tate kept a clean sheet in a 0-0 draw, maintaining the Swans unbeaten start to the season. |
| 7 December 2008 | Jan Rosenthal | Hannover 96 | | Following a red card to Florian Fromlowitz in Bundesliga game against Wolfsburg in 80th minute, Rosenthal taking goalkeeping duties until the end of the match and saved a penalty kick. |
| 7 February 2009 | Dean Windass | Oldham Athletic | | Windass played most of the second half in goal against Leicester City after the sending off of Greg Fleming. He did not concede a goal and the game ended in a 0–0 draw. |
| 13 September 2009 | Jamie Harnwell | Perth Glory | | With all of Perth's substitutions already used, Harnwell played the final minutes of a 2–2 A-League draw against Gold Coast United in goal after Gold Coast striker Shane Smeltz accidentally knocked out Perth goalkeeper Tando Velaphi in the act of scoring the equaliser. |
| 10 March 2010 | Robbie Savage | Derby County | 57 minutes+ | In Derby County's Championship match at Reading, Derby goalkeeper Saul Deeney conceded a 41st-minute penalty and was sent off. As Deeney had already been a substitute brought on for previously injured keeper Stephen Bywater, midfielder Robbie Savage was chosen to play in goal for the remaining hour of the match. Although the resulting penalty Savage faced was struck over the crossbar, he conceded two second half goals as Derby lost 1–4. |
| 5 May 2010 | Diogo Acosta | Palmeiras B | | Scored two goals in the match against Juventus and played as a goalkeeper after Raphael was sent off. Scored one more goal after shooting for defensive field and made the ball cover the opposing goalkeeper in the kick. |
| 16 November 2010 | Henri Lansbury | England U-21s | | Lansbury took over as goalkeeper for the remaining 32 minutes of England's friendly match against Germany U-21s after goalkeeper Jason Steele, a substitute for starter Scott Loach, was sent off. He conceded the resulting penalty but kept out any further goals in the 2-0 loss. |
| 5 December 2010 | Fabian Lustenberger | Hertha BSC | | Lustenberger was forced to play the last eight minutes of a 2. Bundesliga match against 1860 Munich as goalkeeper, following the expulsion of Marco Sejna. |
| 31 January 2011 | Carlinhos Bala | Sport Recife | | During a 2011 Campeonato Pernambucano match against Vitória-PE, the goalkeeper Saulo went forward and headed in a goal from a free kick in the final minute of the game. While celebrating the goal, he suffered a rupture in the anterior cruciate ligament, and Carlinhos Bala (with only 1.62 m.) played in the goal during the injury time. |
| 25 June 2011 | Mike Magee | LA Galaxy | | Magee played 47 minutes of the LA Galaxy's match against their rivals, the San Jose Earthquakes, after Galaxy goalkeeper Donovan Ricketts went off injured in the 24th minute and backup keeper Josh Saunders was sent off in the 43rd minute. Despite the Galaxy playing over a full half with ten men, Magee kept a clean sheet and made four saves, including stopping a shot on the line in the dying minutes, as the match finished scoreless. |
| 21 February 2012 | Henri Lansbury | West Ham United | | Following a red card to Robert Green in a Championship game against Blackpool, Lansbury deputised in goal for the final 35 minutes of the game, keeping a clean sheet for the time he spent in goal in a 4–1 win. |
| 1 April 2012 | Jose Enrique | Liverpool | 10 minutes | Following a red card to Pepe Reina in a Premier League game against Newcastle, Enrique was forced to play in goal against his former team. Newcastle was already 2-0 up when he took over the goalkeeping position, and he kept a clean sheet. |
| 24 November 2012 | Felipe Melo | Galatasaray | | Following Fernando Muslera's expulsion after conceding a penalty kick against Elazığspor, Felipe Melo took his place and saved the penalty in added time to retain his side's lead. |
| 18 December 2012 | Rodrigo Palacio | Inter Milan | | Following an arm injury to Luca Castellazzi in a Coppa Italia match against Hellas Verona and with no substitutions left, Palacio was in goal for the final 16 minutes of the game, making two saves and keeping a clean sheet in a 2–0 home win. |
| 18 May 2013 | Kevin Großkreutz | Borussia Dortmund | 16 minutes | Following a red card to Roman Weidenfeller in Bundesliga game against Hoffenheim in 80th minute, Großkreutz taking goalkeeping duties until the end of the match and conceded one goal from a penalty kick. |
| 26 May 2013 | Mamadou Sakho | Paris Saint-Germain | 12 minutes | In the last league game of the season, Alphonse Areola was replaced after 60 minutes by Ronan Le Crom, who was playing his final game before retirement. When Le Crom was sent off, conceding a penalty, Mamadou Sakho replaced midfielder Clément Chantôme and took on goalkeeping responsibilities, and the resulting penalty was scored by Arnaud Le Lan. |
| 21 July 2013 | Súni Olsen | B36 Tórshavn | | Faroe Islands international Olsen stepped in for Tórður Thomsen after Thomsen's 90th minute sending off in a Faroe Islands Premier League game against Argja Bóltfelag. Olsen conceded a 92nd-minute winner from a Dion Splidt free-kick. |
| 3 November 2013 | Sebastian Polter | Mainz 05 | | Following a red card to Heinz Müller in Bundesliga game against Christian Wetklo in 88th minute, Polter taking goalkeeping duties until the end of the match. |
| 8 February 2014 | Gabi | Atlético Madrid | | Following a red card to Dani Aranzubia in La Liga game against Almería in 84th minute, Gabi deputised in goal for the final six minutes of the game, conceding one goal from penalty kick in a 0–2 loss. |
| 27 August 2014 | Cosmin Moți | Ludogorets Razgrad | | Playing against Steuau București in the play-off round of the Champions League, Moți played as goalkeeper for the final few minutes of extra time. During the ensuing penalty shoot-out, he stopped two kicks, winning the game for his team. |
| 23 October 2014 | Harry Kane | Tottenham Hotspur | | Kane had already scored a hat-trick in a UEFA Europa League game with Greek side Asteras Tripolis and so felt confident enough to step in goal after an 87th minute red card for Hugo Lloris. Kane allowed the ball to bobble under his body and into the net from the resulting free kick, though the tie was already won. |
| 2 December 2014 | Mark McChrystal | Bristol Rovers | | McChrystal played in goal for 50 minutes after an injury to Steve Mildenhall. |
| 6 January 2015 | Leonardo | São Raimundo (RR) | Full match | The São Raimundo team registered only one goalkeeper for the Copa São Paulo dispute, who was sent off in the first match. For the team's second game in the competition, Leonardo acted as goalkeeper, in the 4–1 loss to São Paulo. |
| 10 January 2015 | Matt Harrold | Crawley Town | | Harrold played in goal for around 50 minutes following an injury to Brian Jensen. |
| 17 May 2015 | Diego Souza | Sport Recife | | At 2015 Campeonato Brasileiro Série A match against Flamengo, the goalkeeper Magrão was injured in the minute 81, after Sport had made all the substitutions. Diego Souza played the rest of time as a goalkeeper and conceded a goal, scored by Éverton. |
| 15 August 2015 | Carl Jenkinson | West Ham United | 4 minutes | Following a stoppage time red card for Adrián against Leicester City, Jenkinson played the remainder of the game in goal in a 2–1 loss. |
| 31 October 2015 | Ryan Stevenson | Partick Thistle | | Stevenson played the last five minutes of a Scottish Premiership match against Heart of Midlothian after Partick goalkeeper Ryan Scully was sent off after a foul and conceding a penalty, with Partick already having used all three substitutions. Stevenson was unable to save Osman Sow's penalty, who made the score 0–4 in favour of Hearts. |
| 6 March 2016 | Cristiano Biraghi | Granada | 3 minutes | Following a red card to Andrés Fernández in a La Liga game against Real Betis, Biraghi deputised in goal for the final minutes of the game, concededing one goal from free kick in a 2–0 loss. |
| 16 April 2016 | Alex Revell | Milton Keynes Dons | | With ten minutes remaining of their match against Preston North End and with the score at 1–1, MK Dons goalkeeper Cody Cropper conceded a penalty and was sent off. With the Dons having used all of their substitutions, striker Alex Revell went in goal, saving Joe Garner's penalty to preserve the score at 1–1. Revell managed to keep Preston out for the rest of the match as it finished in a draw. |
| 21 April 2016 | Maicon Roque | São Paulo | 4 minutes | Played in goal for the last 4 minutes of the match against The Strongest, for 2016 Copa Libertadores, after the goalkeeper Denis received the second yellow card and sending off the game, for delaying the continuation of the match on a goal kick throw-in. |
| 7 May 2016 | Ryan Hollingshead | FC Dallas | 6 minutes | After Dallas goalkeeper Jesse González was knocked out after a collision and couldn't continue, and Dallas had used all three substitutions, Hollingshead played six minutes of stoppage time in his side's Major League Soccer match against Toronto FC. Hollingshead was officially credited with one save, from a Sebastian Giovinco free kick, as Toronto won the game 1–0. |
| 7 December 2016 | Quế Ngọc Hải | Vietnam | | In the second leg of the 2016 AFF Championship semi-final match against Indonesia, Quế Ngọc Hải played in goal after Trần Nguyên Mạnh was sent off in the 75th minute. Vietnam managed to score two goals in the remaining regulation time to tie the aggregate scoreline, forcing the match into extra time. However, they were knocked out after Ngọc Hải fouled and conceded a penalty, losing 3-4 on aggregate. |
| 26 April 2017 | Hugo Almeida | AEK Athens | | On 26 April 2017, in the return leg of the semi-finals of the Greek Football Cup against Olympiacos, Almeida played as an emergency goalkeeper for the first time in his career, after Giannis Anestis was sent off in the closing minutes of the game. His team eventually advanced to the final on away goals after a 2–2 aggregate draw. |
| 8 August 2017 | Sam Hutchinson | Sheffield Wednesday | Approx. 7 minutes | Playing in a League Cup 1st round tie against local rivals Chesterfield, outfield player Sam Hutchinson took the place of Joe Wildsmith in goal after the latter was injured late on. Hutchinson had previously scored in the game. |
| 13 August 2017 | Misagh Bahadoran | Global Cebu | | In a Philippines Football League match against JPV Marikina, outfield player and captain Misagh Bahadoran played as a goalkeeper after Global's regular goalkeeper Patrick Deyto was suspended due to accumulated yellow cards and Global had no substitute goalkeepers. JPV Marikina won 5–2 against Global Makati. |
| 6 February 2018 | Dani Alves | Paris Saint-Germain | 1 minute | In the 90th minute of a Coupe de France game against Sochaux, Dani Alves played in net for 30 seconds due to goalkeeper Kevin Trapp being sent off for a foul. |
| 29 April 2018 | César Martins | Juventude | | Juventude's goalkeeper Matheus Cavichioli was sent off after receiving a red card, center-back César Martins was called up to the goalposts for the remaining eight minutes of game, despite Cesar's clean sheet Juventude couldn't avoid the 3–1 loss. |
| 14 May 2018 | Tim Kübel | Toronto FC II | | In a 2018 USL season game against Penn FC, defender Tim Kübel played the last few minutes in goal after goalkeeper Angelo Cavalluzzo ruptured his Achilles tendon and twisted his leg while backpedaling to try and stop Miguel Jaime's goal. Kübel kept a clean sheet for his portion of the game in a 1–0 loss. |
| August 17, 2018 | Nealy Martin | Alabama Crimson Tide | 1 minute | After goalkeeper Alex Plavin received a red card, Martin played 48 seconds in goal, saving a free kick attempt by Yazmeen Ryan. Alabama was then able to substitute goalkeeper Kaylee Hammer. |
| 16 March 2019 | Pontus Jansson | Leeds United | | Following a red card to Leeds keeper Kiko Casilla, Jansson was forced to play in goal in injury time despite a knee injury. |
| 5 May 2019 | Ross McCrorie | Rangers F.C. | | After first choice goalkeeper Allan McGregor was red carded in the 89th minute, defensive midfielder McCrorie took over the gloves. His twin brother Robby is a goalkeeper but had yet to make a first team start for the club at the time of Ross's appearance. |
| 18 May 2019 | Morgan Andrews | Reign FC | | Following an injury to goalkeeper Michelle Betos, Andrews played the final three minutes in goal. |
| 28 September 2019 | Chris Bush | Bromley | 82 minutes+ | Following an injury to goalkeeper Mark Cousins in the eighth minute, Bush played in goal for the rest of the match as there was no substitute goalkeeper. |
| 6 November 2019 | Kyle Walker | Manchester City | 17 minutes | In a UEFA Champions League match against Atalanta, City goalkeeper Ederson was substituted at half time due to a minor injury, and replacement Claudio Bravo was sent off in the 81st minute. Walker was brought on as a substitute and played in goal for the remaining 9 minutes plus stoppage time, keeping a clean sheet. |
| 26 December 2019 | Declan Carville | Ballymena United | | In a NIFL Premiership match against Coleraine, Ballymena goalkeeper Jordan Williamson was sent off, so Carville played in goal for the remaining 24 minutes, keeping a clean sheet. Due to Williamson's suspension and injuries to two other goalkeepers, Carville started in goal for Ballymena in their match against Glentoran. He did not concede until the 86th minute, when a goal kick hit the back of Andrew Burns, allowing Robbie McDaid to be through on goal and score the opening goal. The match finished 2–0 to Glentoran. |
| 28 December 2019 | Declan Carville | Ballymena United | Full match | |
| 21 November 2020 | Rodrigo Schlegel | Orlando City SC | 1 minute (Penalty shootout only) | Playing against New York City FC in the first round of the 2020 MLS Cup Playoffs, Schlegel took over as goalkeeper during the penalty shoot-out after Pedro Gallese received a second yellow card for leaving the goal line early to make what would have been a winning save. Schlegel conceded two penalties before making the decisive save against Guðmundur Þórarinsson, helping Orlando to win and advance to the Conference Semifinals. |
| 4 February 2021 | Martín Sarrafiore | Coritiba | | Went into goal after goalkeeper Wilson was sent off upon receiving a second yellow card for moving forward while defending a penalty, and in the sequence saved a penalty kick from Wellington Paulista, in a match against Fortaleza. |
| 9 February 2021 | Michael Doyle | Notts County | 78 minutes | Following the sending-off of goalkeeper Sam Slocombe against Dagenham & Redbridge in a National League match, with Notts County having not named a substitute goalkeeper, Doyle played in goal for 72 minutes plus stoppage time in a 3-1 win. He credited his years playing Gaelic football for Dublin GAA club St Mark's in Tallaght with providing him good practice for catching the ball. |
| 27 February 2021 | Marco Pinato | Cremonese | | After goalkeeper Marco Carnesecchi got sent off at the 88th minute of a Serie B match against Frosinone, Pinato (the son of a former keeper himself, Davide Pinato) volunteered to get between the sticks for the last minutes of the game: he eventually kept a clean sheet, as his side gained a 4-0 win. |
| 19 March 2021 | Odilon Jérôme | Haiti U23 | 22 minutes | After a segment of Haiti's delegation at the 2020 CONCACAF Men's Olympic Qualifying Championship arrived too late to be tested for SARS-CoV-2 and receive their results, the team were forced to begin their opening match against Honduras with only ten men. As none of these ten players were goalkeepers, defender Odilon Jérôme began the match in goal, conceding twice (one of which was a penalty he nearly saved). Usual goalkeeper Alan Jérôme was listed as a substitute player for Haiti, but was ineligible to participate in the match until his test returned negative, which it did so early into the first half. In the 22nd minute, Alan Jérôme entered the match, taking his place in goal and increasing Haiti to eleven men, thus allowing Odilon Jérôme to assume his usual position in the outfield. |
| 2 May 2021 | Jenna Clark | Glasgow City | | Clark played in goal for the last 10 minutes during Glasgow City's 3–1 win against Spartans after goalkeeper Erin Clachers was sent off. |
| 12 May 2021 | Alex Roldan | Seattle Sounders FC | 5 minutes | Following an injury to goalkeeper Stefan Frei and having already used their three permitted substitutions, Seattle could not substitute a goalkeeper into the match. As a result, Roldan played in goal for the final five minutes of stoppage time during an MLS match between Seattle and the San Jose Earthquakes, which Seattle won 1–0. |
| 19 May 2021 | Enzo Pérez | River Plate | Full match | After all goalkeepers in the team tested positive for COVID-19, Pérez played in goal against Independiente Santa Fe. River Plate won 2–1, and Pérez was awarded 'Man of the Match'. |
| 7 June 2021 | Aizar Akmatov | Kyrgyzstan | | All of Kyrgyzstan's three regular goalkeepers were barred from playing in a 2022 FIFA World Cup Asian qualifier against Mongolia due to being in close contact with player who had tested positive for COVID-19. As a result, Akmatov, a defender, played in goal for Kyrgyzstan, though they lost 0–1 to Mongolia. |
| 11 June 2021 | Ernist Batyrkanov | Kyrgyzstan | | After Akmatovv played as goalkeeper against Mongolia, Batyrkanov started the match before Myanmar. Kyrgyzstan won the match 8–1. |
| 27 June 2021 | Edenílson | Internacional | | Played in the final minutes, in the match against America (MG), for the 2021 Campeonato Brasileiro Série A. |
| 22 August 2021 | Rúben Vezo | Levante | | Following a red card to Aitor Fernández in La Liga game against Real Madrid, Vezo deputised in goal for the final 10 minutes of the game, keeping a clean sheet in a 3–3 draw. |
| 15 October 2021 | Edu | Brusque | | Following a head injury of goalkeeper Ruan Carneiro after committing a penalty, Edu was saved the penalty kick in the 2021 Campeonato Brasileiro Série B match against Remo. Brusque won the game by 3−1. |
| 6 November 2021 | Lewis Dunk | Brighton and Hove Albion | | After Robert Sánchez was sent off in the 92nd minute of the match against Newcastle United, Lewis Dunk played in goal for the remaining minutes of the match as Brighton had used all three of their substitutes. |
| 25 December 2021 | Ikhsan Fandi | Singapore | | After Hassan Sunny received a red card in the 119th minute in the second leg of the 2020 AFF Championship semi-final match against Indonesia, Ikhsan Fandi played in goal for the remaining minutes of the match after Singapore used all six of their substitutes during extra time. |
| 16 January 2022 | Serge Aurier | Ivory Coast | 3 minutes | During a 2021 Africa Cup of Nations match, Serge Aurier played in goal following an injury to the goalkeeper. |
| 24 January 2022 | Chaker Alhadhur | Comoros | Full match | Alhadhur played the entire game as goalkeeper in a 2021 Africa Cup of Nations Round of 16 match against hosts Cameroon after Comoros were left with no fit goalkeepers due to a combination of injuries and positive COVID-19 tests. Comoros were defeated 2–1. |
| 16 March 2022 | Lee Wallace | Queens Park Rangers | | Goalkeeper David Marshall was injured in the dying minutes of QPR's 3–1 EFL Championship loss to Nottingham Forest, after the team had used all their substitutes. Defender Wallace played in goal for the remainder of the game and did not concede. |
| 6 August 2022 | Edmond Tapsoba | Bayer Leverkusen | | After Lukáš Hrádecký was sent off for a handball in the 92nd minute of a Bundesliga match against Borussia Dortmund, Tapsoba played in goal for the final minutes of the 1−0 loss, as Leverkusen had already made all their five available substitutes. |
| 15 August 2022 | Juan Escobar | Cruz Azul | 10 minutes | After goalkeeper Sebastián Jurado who committed a foul was sent off in the 90th minute of a Liga MX match against Toluca, Juan Escobar played in goal for the penalty and the remaining 10 minutes played of the 2−3 loss, as Cruz Azul had already made all their five available substitutes. |
| 28 August 2022 | Leandro Cabrera | Espanyol | | Following a red card to Benjamin Lecomte in a La Liga game against Real Madrid, Cabrera deputised in goal for the final minutes of the game, concededing one goal from free kick in a 1–3 loss. |
| 12 September 2022 | Stefan Schwab | PAOK | 1 minute | After goalkeeper Dominik Kotarski got injured in a Super League Greece match against Lamia at the last minute of the match, Stefan Schwab played in goal for thirty seconds. |
| 14 October 2022 | Vafa Hakhamaneshi | Chennaiyin | | On 14 October 2022, in an Indian Super League home match against Bengaluru, Hakhamaneshi volunteered to go in goal for the last 8 minutes after goalkeeper Debjit Majumder was sent off; he did not concede as the match ended 1–1. |
| 12 February 2023 | Samuele Parlati | Monterosi | | In the injury time of a Serie C match against Giugliano, Parlati volunteered to play in goal, after goalkeeper Marco Alia had been sent off; he managed both to save the subsequent penalty kick by Francesco Salvemini and keep a clean sheet, as his side eventually gained a 2–0 victory through a last-minute goal by Filippo Tolomello. |
| 18 February 2023 | Tatiana Ewodo Ekogo | Cameroon | 12 minutes | Cameroon goalkeeper Ange Bawou was sent off for a reckless foul in the 12th minute of second-half stoppage time of the 2023 Women's World Cup qualifying play-offs against Thailand, with Cameroon having already made all their five available substitutes. Ewodo Ekogo played in goal and did not concede in the final 12 minutes of stoppage time of the 2−0 win. |
| 25 April 2023 | Mohamed Yasser | Teplice | | After Teplice goalkeeper Tomáš Grigar got sent off for violent conduct towards Vasil Kušej in the 89th minute of a league match against Mladá Boleslav, Yasser deputised in goal for the final minutes of the game: he managed to keep a clean sheet, as the match ended in a 1−1 draw. |
| 21 May 2023 | Mo Yu Pong | Fukien | | With the first choice keeper injured, Mo Yu Pong played the final 6 minutes of a fixture between Fukien and Tsun Tsat in the Hong Kong Third Division. Pong kept a clean sheet, but could not prevent a 3-2 defeat. |
| 18 June 2023 | Lam Hiu Yeung | South China | | After South China Keeper Felix Luk got a hand injury in the 79th minute of South China's FA Cup encounter with Sai Kung, and because South China used all their substitutes, Lam Hiu Yeung had to stand in for the final minutes. He conceded a goal, but it did not matter as South China won 8-2. |
| 25 July 2023 | Clay Holstad | Columbus Crew 2 | | Starting goalkeeper Stanislav Lapkes earned a Professional Foul Last Man (DOGSO) red card in the 6th Minute vs Philadelphia Union 2. Columbus Crew 2 was without goalkeeper Brady Scott due to a concussion injury, so there was not another goalkeeper on the Crew 2 gameday roster. Midfielder Clay Holstad subbed on in the 10th minute and recorded 5 saves on 26 shots (11 on goal) from Philadelphia Union 2. Philadelphia Union 2 won the match 6-2. The crowd was heard chanting "Brick Walls are Made of Clay" when Holstad made his saves. |
| August 19, 2023 | Nealy Martin | NJ/NY Gotham FC | 7 minute | Martin played the final minutes of stoppage time in goal after goalkeeper Abby Smith was injured and Gotham had used all their substitutions. |
| 27 August 2023 | Paul Ngue | HKFC | | During HKFC's first fixture of the season against Kitchee, goalkeeper Issey Maholo went down injured in the 80th minute, and with no backup goalkeeper, Paul Ngue played in net for the remaining minutes. Ngue kept a clean sheet, but could not prevent a 8-0 loss. |
| 7 October 2023 | Olivier Giroud | AC Milan | 8 minutes | AC Milan's goalkeeper Mike Maignan got sent off after fouling Genoa's forward Caleb Ekuban in the 97th minute, forcing Olivier Giroud to take goalkeeping duties until the end of the match. The player entered the Best XI of the round as the best goalkeeper due to his outstanding performance. |
| 3 November 2023 | María José Urrutia | Chile women | Full match | Had to play the Gold medal match of the 2023 Pan American Games due to the return of goalkeepers Christiane Endler and Antonia Canales, who were not authorized by their clubs after the end of the FIFA date. |
| November 11, 2023 | Nealy Martin | NJ/NY Gotham FC | 1 minute | Martin played the final 90 seconds of the match in goal after goalkeeper Mandy Haught received a red card and Gotham had used all their substitutions. |
| 18 February 2024 | Gustavo Henrique | Corinthians | 12 minutes | Corinthians' goalkeeper, Cássio, was sent off after fouling Rony, of Palmeiras, so Gustavo Henrique replaced him, the game ended in a stalemate. |
| 21 April 2024 | Nathan Peate | Bala Town | | Bala's goalkeeper Kelland Absalom was sent off against Caernarfon Town in the Cymru Premier, requiring Peate to go in goal for the majority of the second half. |
| 31 August 2024 | Enrico Delprato | Parma | 15 minutes | After his goalkeeper Zion Suzuki received a red card and all substitutions were exhausted, Parma captain Enrico Delprato played the final 15 minutes as goalkeeper. Delprato conceded two goals in stoppage time in a 2024-25 Serie A match away at Napoli which ended 2–1. |
| 7 September 2024 | Rory Feely | Barrow | 66 minutes | He was brought on in the 44th minute in a match against Swindon Town after starting goalkeeper Paul Farman got sent off with Barrow being 1-0 up and without a backup goalkeeper on the bench. He didn't concede until the 98th minute and the game ended 1-1. |
| 7 September 2024 | Sean Zawadzki | Columbus Crew | 45 minutes | He was brought on in the 45th minute in a match against Seattle Sounders after starting goalkeeper Abraham Romero got sent off with the score tied 0-0 and without a backup goalkeeper on the bench. The game ended in a 4-0 Seattle victory. Zawadzki recorded 2 saves. |
| 18 January 2025 | Marreta | Sampaio Corrêa (RJ) | 4 minutes | In the match against Botafogo, valid for the 2025 Campeonato Carioca. |
| 13 March 2025 | Panagiotis Retsos | Olympiacos F.C. | 10 minutes | In the second leg of the knockout phase of the 2024–25 UEFA Europa League against FK Bodø/Glimt, on the 88th minute, Konstantinos Tzolakis was shown the red card after committing a professional foul. P. Retsos had to take Tzolakis' place as all substitutions were exhausted. The game ended in a 2-1 Olympiacos victory, but a 4-2 Bodø/Glimt victory on aggregate. |
| 31 August 2025 | Jarleysom | Portimonense | | Both played in goal in the match against Benfica B, after the goalkeepers Sébastien Cibois and Douglas Friedrich were sent off. Heitor played until the end of the first half and Jarleysom during the second half, standing out for his performance and being infamous elected the best player of the match. Portimonense won by 2–1 with nine players most of the time. |
| 31 August 2025 | Heitor | Portimonense | | Both played in goal in the match against Benfica B, after the goalkeepers Sébastien Cibois and Douglas Friedrich were sent off. Heitor played until the end of the first half and Jarleysom during the second half, standing out for his performance and being infamous elected the best player of the match. Portimonense won by 2–1 with nine players most of the time. |
| 22 August 2026 | Bobby Faulkner | Tranmere Rovers | 55 minutes | Tranmere Goalkeeper Harrison Male pulled up with a back injury in the 46th minute of an EFL League One match away at Port Vale F.C. and could not continue. No substitute goalkeeper was on the bench, so defender Bobby Faulkner went in goal. Faulkner kept a clean sheet with an assured performance and Tranmere who had trailed 1-0 at the time of the injury secured a 1-1 draw with a goal from Tom Ince |

== See also ==
- List of goalscoring goalkeepers
- Two-way player
