= 2025–26 UC AlbinoLeffe season =

Italian football club season 2025-26

UC AlbinoLeffe
2025–26 season
- Manager: Giovanni Lopez
- Stadium: AlbinoLeffe Stadium
- Serie C Group A: 16th
- Coppa Italia Serie C: First round
- Biggest defeat: AlbinoLeffe 0–3 Pro Vercelli

The 2025–26 season, the 28th season in the history of Unione Calcio AlbinoLeffe, will see the club compete in Serie C for the seventh consecutive year and participate in the Coppa Italia Serie C. The competitions are scheduled to begin on 16 August 2025.

== Squad ==
=== Transfers In ===
Pos.	Player	Transferred from	Fee	Date	Source
FW	(Canada) Dante Lomangino	(Italy) Portogruaro	Loan return	30 June 2025	
FW	(Albania) Rrok Toma	(Albania) KF Teuta	Loan return	30 June 2025	
MF	(Italy) Andrea Mandelli	(Italy) Carpi	Free	3 July 2025	
FW	(Italy) Sebastiano Svidercoschi	(Italy) Legnago Salus	Free	4 July 2025	
GK	(Italy) Gabriele Baldi	(Italy) Cosenza	Undisclosed	25 July 2025	
DF	(Italy) Alessandro Garattoni	(Italy) Virtus Entella	Undisclosed	5 August 2025	
GK	(Italy) Salvatore Di Chiara	(Italy) Olbia	Undisclosed	13 August 2025	
FW	(Senegal) Amadou Sarr	(Italy) Inter U23	Undisclosed	20 August 2025	
FW	(Italy) Andrea De Paoli	(Italy) Giugliano	Undisclosed	1 September 2025	

=== Transfers Out ===
Pos.	Player	Transferred to	Fee	Date	Source
MF	(Italy) Mattia Mustacchio	(Italy) Piacenza	Contract terminated	30 June 2025	
FW	(Italy) Salvatore Longo	(Italy) AlbinoLeffe	Free	3 July 2025	
MF	(Italy) Tommaso Vinzioli	(Italy) Trevigliese	Free	24 July 2025	
MF	(Italy) Davide Munari	(Italy) Cavese	Free	8 August 2025	
MF	(Italy) Tommaso Ricordi	(Italy) Pro Patria	Free	14 August 2025	
FW	(Italy) Mohamed Alì Zoma	(Germany) 1. FC Nürnberg	Undisclosed	19 August 2025	
MF	(Italy) Matteo Zanini	(Italy) Siracusa	Free	25 August 2025	
DF	(Italy) Francesco Zambelli	(Italy) Lemine Almenno	Free	26 August 2025	
DF	(Italy) Lorenzo Bosia	(Italy) ACR Messina	Loan	31 August 2025	
FW	(Albania) Rrok Toma	(Albania) FK Partizani	Free	2 September 2025	

== Friendlies ==
26 July 2025	AlbinoLeffe	2–0	Nuova Sondrio	Zanica
18:00				Stadium: AlbinoLeffe Stadium

30 July 2025	Monza	2–0	AlbinoLeffe	Monza
				Stadium: Centro Sportivo Silvio e Luigi Berlusconi-Monzello

2 August 2025	Juventus Next Gen	2–2	AlbinoLeffe	Vinovo
17:00				Stadium: Allianz Training Center

== Competitions ==
=== Overall record ===
Competition	First match	Last match	Starting round	Final position	Record							
Competition	First match	Last match	Starting round	Final position	Pld	W	D	L	GF	GA	GD	Win %
Serie C	23 August 2025	26 April 2026	Matchday 1		5	1	2	2	9	10	−1	20.00
Coppa Italia Serie C	16 August 2025		First round	First round	1	0	0	1	0	3	−3	0.00
Total					6	1	2	3	9	13	−4	16.67

Last updated: 21 September 2025
Source: Competitions

=== Serie C ===
Group A

==== Results summary ====
Overall								Home						Away					
Pld	W	D	L	GF	GA	GD	Pts	W	D	L	GF	GA	GD	W	D	L	GF	GA	GD
5	1	2	2	9	10	−1	5	1	1	1	6	6	0	0	1	1	3	4	−1

Last updated: 21 September 2025.

==== Results by round ====
Round	1	2	3	4	5
Ground	H	A	H	A	H
Result	D	L	L	D	W
Position	8	15			

Updated to match(es) played on 21 September 2025. Source:
A = Away; H = Home; W = Win; D = Draw; L = Loss

==== Matches ====
The competition draw was held on 28 July 2025.

23 August 2025 1	AlbinoLeffe	2–2	Dolomiti Bellunesi	Zanica
21:00 UTC+2	Svidercoschi 20' (pen.); Lombardi 74'		Toci 44'; Agosti 45+6'	Stadium: AlbinoLeffe Stadium; Attendance: 635; Referee: Dario Acquafredda

29 August 2025 2	Pro Vercelli	2–1	AlbinoLeffe	Vercelli
21:00 UTC+2	Comi 29'; Coccolo 84'		Mandelli 60'	Stadium: Stadio Silvio Piola; Attendance: 1,364; Referee: Lorenzo Maccarini

6 September 2025 3	AlbinoLeffe	2–3	Renate	Zanica
15:00 UTC+2	Parlati 77'; De Paoli 90+6' (pen.)		Kolaj 3'; Ruiz Giraldo 57'; Spalluto 79'	Stadium: AlbinoLeffe Stadium; Referee: Deborah Bianchi

14 September 2025 4	Trento	2–2	AlbinoLeffe	Trento
15:00 UTC+2	Dalmonte 56'; Muça 79'		Garattoni 1'; Parlati 26'	Stadium: Stadio Briamasco; Attendance: 900; Referee: Antonio Di Reda

21 September 2025 5	AlbinoLeffe	2–1	Cittadella	Zanica
20:30 UTC+2	Mandelli 11'; Sali 89'		Pavan 75'	Stadium: AlbinoLeffe Stadium; Referee: Francesco D'Eusanio

=== Coppa Italia Serie C ===
16 August 2025 First round	AlbinoLeffe	0–3	Pro Vercelli	Zanica
18:00			Sow 19'; Rutigliano 54'; Comi 90+1'	Stadium: AlbinoLeffe Stadium; Referee: Carlo Esposito
