= William Mellor =

William Mellor could refer to:

- Bill Mellor (1874–1940), American baseball player
- Bill Mellor (footballer), (1886–1938), English football goalkeeper
- Chip Mellor (full name William H. Mellor) (1950–2024), American lawyer and political activist
- Will Mellor (born 1976), (British actor)
- William Mellor (journalist) (1888–1942), British journalist and left-wing political activist
- William Mellor (footballer), English footballer
- William C. Mellor (1903–1963), American cinematographer
- William Frederick Mellor, English missionary

== See also ==
- Billy Mellors (born 1975), Scottish indoor and lawn bowler
- Jack Mellor (footballer, born 1896), English footballer
- John William Mellor (1835–1911), English lawyer
- Joseph William Mellor (1868–1938), English chemist
