= John King (Scottish footballer) =

Scottish footballer

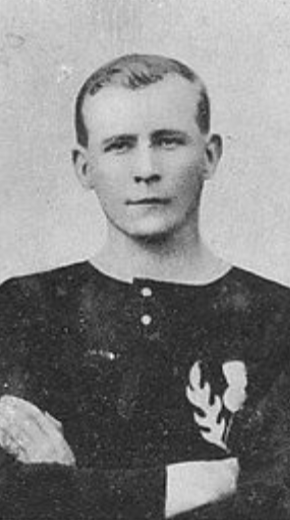
- King while a Partick Thistle player.

Personal information
- Full name: John King
- Date of birth: 25 November 1888
- Place of birth: Dykehead, Scotland
- Date of death: 9 August 1984 (aged 95)
- Place of death: Law, Scotland
- Height: 5 ft 7 in (1.70 m)
- Position: Inside right

Senior career*
Years	Team	Apps	(Gls)
- Renfrew
–1910	Shotts United		
1910–1913	Partick Thistle	78	(11)
1913–1915	Newcastle United	33	(6)
1915–1916	Dykehead		
1915–1916	→ Third Lanark (loan)	14	(2)
1916–1917	Motherwell	29	(3)
1917	→ Newcastle United (guest)		
1917–1918	Partick Thistle	30	(4)
1918–1920	Hibernian	11	(2)
1920–1921	Newcastle United	21	(2)
1921–1922	Dykehead		
1921–1922	→ Clydebank (loan)		
1922	Clydebank		
1922–1923	Dykehead		
1923–1926	Clydebank		

International career
1910	Scotland Juniors	1	(0)
1912	Scottish League XI	1	(0)
- * Club domestic league appearances and goals

John King (25 November 1888 – 9 August 1984) was a Scottish professional footballer who played as an inside right in the Scottish League and the Football League, most notably for Partick Thistle and Newcastle United respectively.

== Career ==
An inside right, King had a long career in the Scottish and the English leagues and played top-division football for Partick Thistle (two spells), Newcastle United (two spells), Third Lanark, Motherwell, Hibernian and Clydebank. In 1915 he played a full league match for Newcastle as goalkeeper after regular Bill Mellor was injured, keeping a clean sheet.

At international level, King was capped by Scotland Juniors and came into consideration for a full cap, evidenced by his selection for the Home Scots v Anglo-Scots trial match in 1913. He made one appearance for the Scottish League XI in 1912.

== Personal life ==
King served as a private on home service with the Cameronians (Scottish Rifles) during the First World War. His brother Alex (17 years older, leading him to be mistakenly described as an uncle) was a Scottish international footballer. Both had several short spells with hometown team Dykehead between engagements with more prominent clubs.

== Career statistics ==
Appearances and goals by club, season and competition
Club	Season	League			National Cup		Total	
Club	Season	Division	Apps	Goals	Apps	Goals	Apps	Goals
Partick Thistle	1909–10	Scottish Division One	3	0	0	0	3	0
Partick Thistle	1910–11	Scottish Division One	21	3	1	0	22	3
Partick Thistle	1911–12	Scottish Division One	22	6	2	0	24	6
Partick Thistle	1912–13	Scottish Division One	32	2	2	0	34	2
Partick Thistle	Total		78	11	5	0	83	11
Newcastle United	1913–14	First Division	15	1	0	0	15	1
Newcastle United	1914–15	First Division	18	5	7	2	25	7
Newcastle United	Total		33	6	7	2	40	8
Third Lanark (loan)	1915–16	Scottish Division One	14	2	—		14	2
Motherwell	1916–17	Scottish Division One	29	3	—		29	3
Partick Thistle	1917–18	Scottish Division One	30	4	—		30	4
Partick Thistle	Total		108	15	5	0	113	15
Hibernian	1918–19	Scottish Division One	11	2	—		11	2
Newcastle United	1919–20	First Division	9	0	—		9	0
Newcastle United	1920–21	First Division	12	2	0	0	12	2
Newcastle United	Total		54	8	7	2	61	10
Clydebank	1921–22	Scottish Division One	22	4	—		22	4
Career total			238	34	12	2	250	36
