= Alexander King (footballer) =

Scottish footballer

Alex King
Personal information
- Full name: Alexander King
- Date of birth: 27 July 1871
- Place of birth: Shotts, Scotland
- Date of death: 12 December 1957 (aged 86)
- Place of death: Shotts, Scotland
- Positions: Left half; inside left

Senior career*
Years	Team	Apps	(Gls)
–	Dykehead		
1893	Airdrieonians		
1893	Albion Rovers		
1893–1894	Wishaw Thistle		
1894–1895	Darwen		
1895	Dykehead		
1895	→ Rangers (guest)	0	(0)
1895–1896	Heart of Midlothian	16	(11)
1896–1900	Celtic	56	(17)
1900	Dykehead		
1900–1901	St Bernard's	9	(0)
1901–1903	Dykehead		
1903–1904	Airdrieonians	23	(0)
1904	Dykehead		

International career
1896–1899	Scotland	6	(1)
1896–1898	Scottish League XI	4	(2)
- * Club domestic league appearances and goals

Alexander King (27 July 1871 – 12 December 1957) was a Scottish footballer who played for clubs including Heart of Midlothian and Celtic. He scored one of the goals for Hearts as they won the 1896 Scottish Cup Final by 3–1 against Hibernian, and continued his success with Celtic, winning the Scottish Football League title in 1897–98 and the Scottish Cup in 1899.

King represented Scotland six times and played for the Scottish Football League XI four times.

His brother John King (17 years younger, leading him to be mistakenly described as a nephew) was also a footballer whose clubs included Partick Thistle and Newcastle United. Both had several short spells with hometown team Dykehead between engagements with more prominent clubs.

== See also ==
- Played for Celtic and Rangers
