= 2020–21 SS Lazio season =

Lazio
2020–21 season
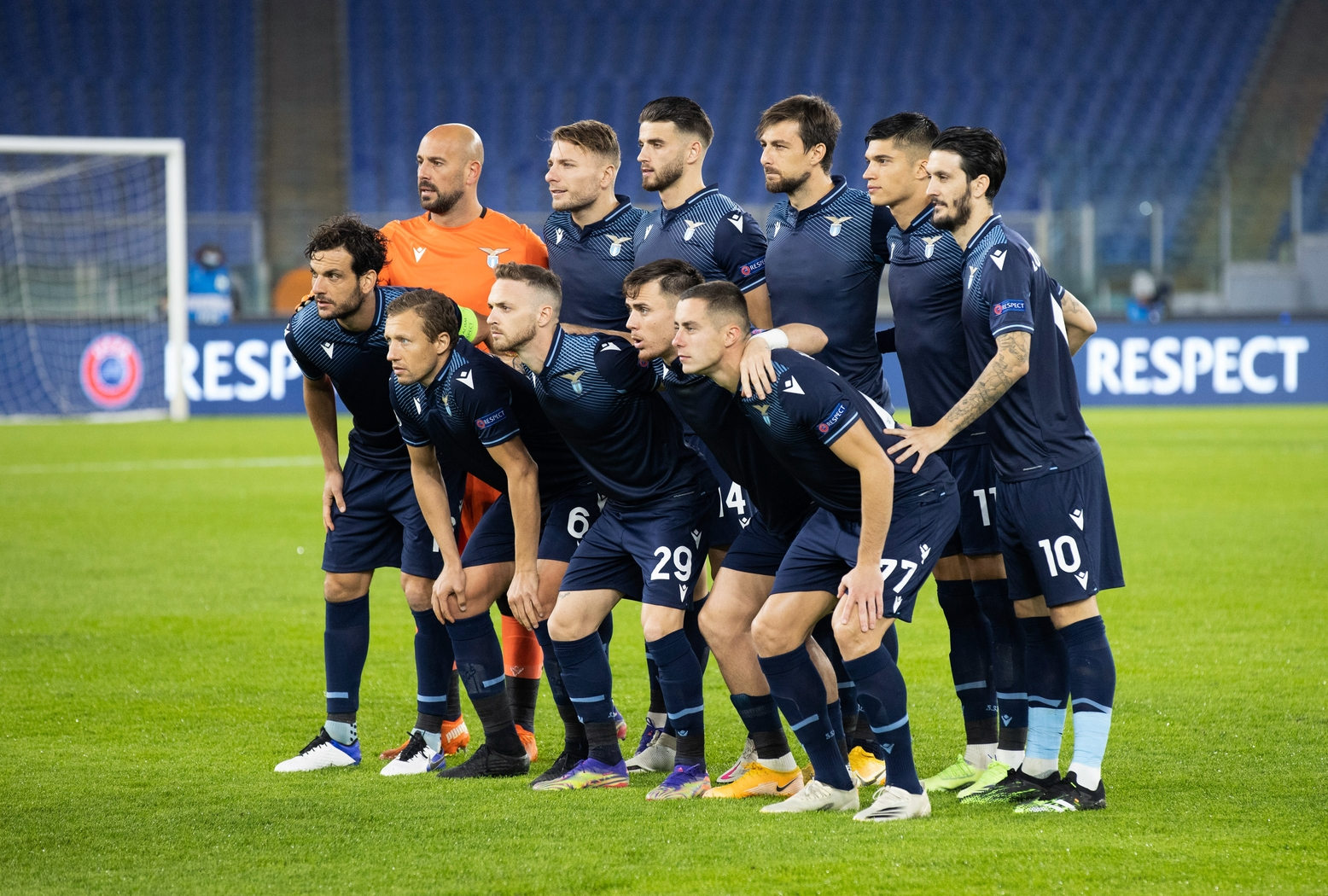
- Lazio players lining up before a UEFA Champions League match against Zenit Saint Petersburg in November 2020
- Owner: Claudio Lotito
- Chairman: Claudio Lotito
- Head coach: Simone Inzaghi
- Stadium: Stadio Olimpico
- Serie A: 6th
- Coppa Italia: Quarter-finals
- UEFA Champions League: Round of 16
- Top goalscorer: League: Ciro Immobile (20); All: Ciro Immobile (25)
- Biggest win: 3–0 vs Roma; 3–0 vs Milan
- Biggest defeat: 1–4 vs Atalanta; 1–4 vs Bayern Munich; 2–5 vs Napoli
Home colours	Away colours	Third colours

The 2020–21 season was the 120th season in the existence of SS Lazio and the club's 33rd consecutive season in the top flight of Italian football. In addition to the domestic league, Lazio participated in this season's editions of the Coppa Italia and also participated in the UEFA Champions League. The season covered the period from 2 August 2020 to 30 June 2021.

== Players ==
=== First-team squad ===
As of 2 February 2021.

Note: Flags indicate national team as defined under FIFA eligibility rules; some limited exceptions apply. Players may hold more than one non-FIFA nationality.

No.	Pos.	Nation	Player
1	GK	ALB	Thomas Strakosha
3	DF	BRA	Luiz Felipe
4	MF	ESP	Patric
6	MF	BRA	Lucas Leiva
7	MF	BRA	Andreas Pereira (on loan from Manchester United)
8	MF	NED	Djavan Anderson
10	FW	ESP	Luis Alberto
11	FW	ARG	Joaquín Correa
13	DF	ITA	Nicolò Armini
14	DF	NED	Wesley Hoedt (on loan from Southampton)
16	MF	ITA	Marco Parolo (vice-captain)
17	FW	ITA	Ciro Immobile
18	MF	ARG	Gonzalo Escalante
19	MF	BIH	Senad Lulić (captain)

No.	Pos.	Nation	Player
20	FW	ECU	Felipe Caicedo
21	MF	SRB	Sergej Milinković-Savić
25	GK	ESP	Pepe Reina
26	DF	ROU	Ștefan Radu
29	MF	ITA	Manuel Lazzari
32	MF	ITA	Danilo Cataldi
33	DF	ITA	Francesco Acerbi
37	DF	ARG	Mateo Musacchio
53	MF	POL	Szymon Czyż
71	GK	ALB	Marco Alia
77	MF	MNE	Adam Marušić
92	MF	CIV	Jean-Daniel Akpa Akpro
94	FW	KOS	Vedat Muriqi
96	MF	ALG	Mohamed Farès

=== Other players under contract ===
As of 11 February 2021.

Note: Flags indicate national team as defined under FIFA eligibility rules; some limited exceptions apply. Players may hold more than one non-FIFA nationality.

No. / Pos. / Nation / Player; 66 / MF / FIN / Abukar Mohamed	No. / Pos. / Nation / Player; — / MF / CMR / Joseph Minala

=== Out on loan ===
As of 2 February 2021.

Note: Flags indicate national team as defined under FIFA eligibility rules; some limited exceptions apply. Players may hold more than one non-FIFA nationality.

No.	Pos.	Nation	Player
—	GK	LTU	Marius Adamonis (at Salernitana until 30 June 2021)
—	DF	GRE	Nikos Baxevanos (at (Romania) Politehnica Iași until 30 June 2021)
—	DF	ARG	Tiago Casasola (at Salernitana until 30 June 2021)
—	DF	DEN	Riza Durmisi (at Salernitana until 30 June 2021)
—	DF	ALB	Sergio Kalaj (at Grosseto until 30 June 2021)
—	DF	ITA	Luca Falbo (at Viterbese until 30 June 2021)
—	DF	BEL	Jordan Lukaku (at (Belgium) Antwerp until 30 June 2021)
—	DF	POR	Jorge Silva (at (Portugal) Boavista until 30 June 2021)
—	DF	SVK	Denis Vavro (at (Spain) Huesca until 30 June 2021)
—	MF	ITA	André Anderson (at Salernitana until 30 June 2021)
—	MF	ITA	Emanuele Cicerelli (at Salernitana until 30 June 2021)

No.	Pos.	Nation	Player
—	MF	POL	Patryk Dziczek (at Salernitana until 30 June 2021)
—	MF	ESP	Jony (at (Spain) Osasuna until 30 June 2021)
—	MF	MAR	Sofian Kiyine (at Salernitana until 30 June 2021)
—	MF	ITA	Cristiano Lombardi (at Salernitana until 30 June 2021)
—	MF	ITA	Fabio Maistro (at Pescara until 30 June 2021)
—	MF	ITA	Biagio Morrone (at Foggia until 30 June 2021)
—	FW	NED	Bobby Adekanye (at (Netherlands) ADO Den Haag until 30 June 2021)
—	FW	CIV	Cedric Gondo (at Salernitana until 30 June 2021)
—	FW	ITA	Simone Palombi (at Pisa until 30 June 2021)
—	FW	ITA	Alessandro Rossi (at Viterbese until 30 June 2021)

== Transfers ==
=== In ===
Date	Pos.	Player	Age	Moving from	Fee	Notes	Source
27 August 2020	GK	(Spain) Pepe Reina	37	(Italy) Milan	Free		
1 September 2020	MF	(Argentina) Gonzalo Escalante	27	Free agent	Free	Contract with Eibar expired	
15 September 2020	FW	(Kosovo) Vedat Muriqi	26	(Turkey) Fenerbahçe	€17,500,000		
18 September 2020	MF	(Ivory Coast) Jean-Daniel Akpa Akpro	27	(Italy) Salernitana	Undisclosed		
1 October 2020	MF	(Algeria) Mohamed Farès	24	(Italy) SPAL	€10,000,000		
27 January 2021	DF	(Argentina) Mateo Musacchio	30	(Italy) Milan	€1,000,000		

==== Loans in ====
Date	Pos.	Player	Age	Moving from	Fee	Notes	Source
2 October 2020	MF	(Brazil) Andreas Pereira	24	(England) Manchester United	Loan	Loan with an option to buy	
5 October 2020	DF	(Netherlands) Wesley Hoedt	26	(England) Southampton	Loan	Loan with an option to buy	

=== Out ===
Date	Pos.	Player	Age	Moving to	Fee	Notes	Source
9 July 2020	MF	(Kosovo) Valon Berisha	27	(France) Reims	€5,000,000		
1 September 2020	GK	(Italy) Guido Guerrieri	24	(Italy) Salernitana	Undisclosed		
16 September 2020	MF	(Croatia) Milan Badelj	31	(Italy) Genoa	Undisclosed		
30 September 2020	DF	(Brazil) Wallace	25	(Turkey) Yeni Malatyaspor	Undisclosed		
22 October 2020	DF	(Angola) Bastos	28	(Saudi Arabia) Al-Ain	€800,000		
30 January 2021	DF	(Cyprus) Andreas Karo	24	(Portugal) Marítimo	Undisclosed	Originally intended as loan, but was then purchased	
31 January 2021	MF	(Italy) Davide Di Gennaro	32	(Italy) Cesena	Undisclosed		
31 January 2021	GK	(Belgium) Silvio Proto	37	Retired	N/A	Contract terminated	

==== Loans out ====
Date	Pos.	Player	Age	Moving to	Fee	Notes	Source
6 September 2020	DF	(Portugal) Jorge Silva	21	(Portugal) Boavista	N/A		
14 September 2020	MF	(Italy) Fabio Maistro	22	(Italy) Pescara	N/A		
18 September 2020	DF	(Argentina) Tiago Casasola	25	(Italy) Salernitana	N/A		
18 September 2020	DF	(Cyprus) Andreas Karo	24	(Italy) Salernitana	N/A		
18 September 2020	MF	(Italy) Cristiano Lombardi	25	(Italy) Salernitana	N/A		
19 September 2020	FW	(Italy) Alessandro Rossi	23	(Italy) Viterbese	N/A		
20 September 2020	MF	(Spain) Jony	29	(Spain) Osasuna	N/A	Loan with an option to buy	
24 September 2020	FW	(Italy) Simone Palombi	24	(Italy) Pisa	N/A		
2 October 2020	DF	(Italy) Luca Falbo	20	(Italy) Viterbese	N/A		
5 October 2020	GK	(Lithuania) Marius Adamonis	23	(Italy) Salernitana	N/A		
5 October 2020	FW	(Brazil) André Anderson	21	(Italy) Salernitana	N/A		
5 October 2020	MF	(Poland) Patryk Dziczek	22	(Italy) Salernitana	N/A		
5 October 2020	DF	(Belgium) Jordan Lukaku	26	(Belgium) Antwerp	N/A		
5 October 2020	FW	(Netherlands) Bobby Adekanye	21	(Spain) Cádiz	N/A		
22 January 2021	DF	(Denmark) Riza Durmisi	27	(Italy) Salernitana	N/A		
28 January 2021	MF	(Morocco) Sofian Kiyine	23	(Italy) Salernitana	N/A		
28 January 2021	FW	(Netherlands) Bobby Adekanye	21	(Netherlands) ADO Den Haag	N/A	Loaned after Cádiz stint was terminated six months early	
1 February 2021	DF	(Slovakia) Denis Vavro	24	(Spain) Huesca	N/A		

== Pre-season and friendlies ==
Win Draw Loss

29 August 2020 Friendly	Lazio (Italy)	2–2	(Italy) Triestina	Auronzo di Cadore, Italy
16:00 CEST (UTC+2)	Acerbi 3'; Parolo 60'	Report	Gómez 38', 42'	Stadium: Stadio Rodolfo Zandegiacomo; Attendance: 410; Referee: Francesco Zago

1 September 2020 Friendly	Lazio (Italy)	1–0	(Italy) Padova	Auronzo di Cadore, Italy
17:00 CEST (UTC+2)	Fazzi 88' (o.g.)	Report		Stadium: Stadio Rodolfo Zandegiacomo; Referee: Dario Duzel

4 September 2020 Friendly	Lazio (Italy)	3–2	(Italy) Vicenza	Auronzo di Cadore, Italy
16:00 CEST (UTC+2)	Lazzari 13'; Luis Alberto 44' (pen.), 60'	Report	Giacomelli 21'; Gori 25'	Stadium: Stadio Rodolfo Zandegiacomo; Referee: Sergio Palmieri

12 September 2020 Friendly	Frosinone (Italy)	0–1	(Italy) Lazio	Frosinone, Italy
18:00 CEST (UTC+2)		Report	Correa 63'	Stadium: Stadio Benito Stirpe; Attendance: 0 Referee: Claudio Campobasso

19 September 2020 Friendly	Lazio (Italy)	0–0	(Italy) Benevento	Rome, Italy
18:00 CEST (UTC+2)		Report		Stadium: Stadio Olimpico; Referee: Fabrizio Pasqua

== Competitions ==
=== Overview ===
Competition	First match	Last match	Starting round	Final position	Record							
Competition	First match	Last match	Starting round	Final position	Pld	W	D	L	GF	GA	GD	Win %
Serie A	26 September 2020	23 May 2021	Matchday 1	6th	38	21	5	12	61	55	+6	55.26
Coppa Italia	21 January 2021	27 January 2021	Round of 16	Quarter-finals	2	1	0	1	4	4	+0	50.00
Champions League	20 October 2020	17 March 2021	Group stage	Round of 16	8	2	4	2	13	13	+0	25.00
Total					48	24	9	15	78	72	+6	50.00

Source: Soccerway

=== Serie A ===
==== League table ====
Pos	Team	Pld	W	D	L	GF	GA	GD	Pts	Qualification or relegation
4	Juventus	38	23	9	6	77	38	+39	78 (Note: Atalanta finished ahead of Juventus on head-to-head points: Juventus 1–1 Atalanta, Atalanta 1–0 Juventus.)	Qualification for Champions League group stage
5	Napoli	38	24	5	9	86	41	+45	77	Qualification for Europa League group stage (Note: Since the winners of the 2020–21 Coppa Italia, Juventus, qualified for the Champions League, the Europa League berth awarded to the Coppa Italia winners was passed to the sixth-placed team, and the Europa Conference League berth awarded to the sixth-placed team was passed to the seventh-placed team.)
6	Lazio	38	21	5	12	61	55	+6	68	Qualification for Europa League group stage
7	Roma	38	18	8	12	68	58	+10	62	Qualification for Conference League play-off round
8	Sassuolo	38	17	11	10	64	56	+8	62	

Source: Serie A, Soccerway
Rules for classification: 1) Points; 2) Head-to-head points; 3) Head-to-head goal difference; 4) Goal difference; 5) Goals scored; 6) Draw. (Note: Head-to-head record is used only after all the matches between the teams in question have been played)

==== Results summary ====
Overall								Home						Away					
Pld	W	D	L	GF	GA	GD	Pts	W	D	L	GF	GA	GD	W	D	L	GF	GA	GD
38	21	5	12	61	55	+6	68	13	3	3	36	23	+13	8	2	9	25	32	−7

Source: Serie A

==== Results by round ====
Round	1	2	3	4	5	6	7	8	9	10	11	12	13	14	15	16	17	18	19	20	21	22	23	24	25	26	27	28	29	30	31	32	33	34	35	36	37	38
Ground	H	A	H	A	H	A	H	A	H	A	H	A	H	A	A	H	A	H	H	A	H	A	H	A	H	A	H	A	H	A	H	A	H	H	A	H	A	A
Result	L	W	D	L	W	W	D	W	L	W	L	D	W	L	D	W	W	W	W	W	W	L	W	L	D	L	W	W	W	W	W	L	W	W	L	W	L	L
Position	12	10	9	15	12	10	9	8	9	7	9	9	8	8	9	8	8	7	7	6	5	7	6	7	7	7	7	7	6	6	6	6	6	6	6	6	6	6

Source: Serie A
A = Away; H = Home; W = Win; D = Draw; L = Loss

==== Matches ====
The league fixtures were announced on 2 September 2020.

26 September 2020 2	Cagliari	0–2	Lazio	Cagliari
18:00 CEST (UTC+2)	Marin (yellow card) 51'	Report	Lazzari 4'; Lucas (yellow card) 61'; Immobile 74'	Stadium: Sardegna Arena; Referee: Davide Massa

30 September 2020 1	Lazio	1–4	Atalanta	Rome
20:45 CEST (UTC+2)	Marušić (yellow card) 12'; Luis Alberto (yellow card) 26'; Lucas (yellow card) 40'; Caicedo 57', (yellow card) 75'; Cataldi (yellow card) 70'; Acerbi (yellow card) 72'; Immobile (yellow card) 90+4'	Report	Gosens 10'; Djimsiti (yellow card) 17'; Freuler (yellow card) 26'; Hateboer 32'; Gómez 41', 61'	Stadium: Stadio Olimpico; Referee: Fabio Maresca
Note: The match was originally scheduled for 20 September 2020, but was postponed due to Atalanta's involvement in the knockout phase of the UEFA Champions League.

4 October 2020 3	Lazio	1–1	Internazionale	Rome
15:00 CEST (UTC+2)	Farès (yellow card) 37'; Milinković-Savić 55'; Immobile (red card) 70'; Lazzari (yellow card) 79'; Patric (yellow card) 87'	Report	Martínez 30'; Lukaku (yellow card) 42'; Vidal (yellow card) 70'; Young (yellow card) 78'; Sensi (red card) 87'; Barella (yellow card) 90+3'	Stadium: Stadio Olimpico; Referee: Marco Guida

17 October 2020 4	Sampdoria	3–0	Lazio	Genoa
18:00 CEST (UTC+2)	Quagliarella 32'; Augello 41'; Ramírez (yellow card) 43'; Thorsby (yellow card) 64'; Damsgaard 74'	Report	Parolo (yellow card) 12'; Caicedo (yellow card) 44'	Stadium: Stadio Luigi Ferraris; Referee: Daniele Orsato

24 October 2020 5	Lazio	2–1	Bologna	Rome
20:45 CEST (UTC+2)	Acerbi (yellow card) 30'; Luis Alberto 54'; Hoedt (yellow card) 60'; Akpa Akpro (yellow card) 70'; Immobile 76'	Report	Danilo (yellow card) 55'; Tomiyasu (yellow card) 58'; Svanberg (yellow card) 66'; De Silvestri 90+1'	Stadium: Stadio Olimpico; Referee: Massimiliano Irrati

1 November 2020 6	Torino	3–4	Lazio	Turin
15:00 CET (UTC+1)	Bremer 19'; Belotti 24' (pen.); Lukić 87'; Nkoulou (yellow card) 90+5'; Rincón (yellow card) 90+7'	Report	Pereira 15', (yellow card) 44'; Milinković-Savić 49'; Hoedt (yellow card) 86'; Immobile (yellow card) 88', (goal) 90+5' (pen.); Caicedo 90+8', (yellow card) 90+9'	Stadium: Stadio Olimpico Grande Torino; Attendance: 0 Referee: Daniele Chiffi

8 November 2020 7	Lazio	1–1	Juventus	Rome
12:30 CET (UTC+1)	Cataldi (yellow card) 45+1'; Akpa Akpro (yellow card) 78'; Caicedo 90+5'	Report	Ronaldo 15'; Bentancur (yellow card) 51'; Cuadrado (yellow card) 84'	Stadium: Stadio Olimpico; Attendance: 0 Referee: Davide Massa

21 November 2020 8	Crotone	0–2	Lazio	Crotone
15:00 CET (UTC+1)	Rispoli (yellow card) 10'; Marrone (yellow card) 25'; Cuomo (yellow card) 56'	Report	Immobile 21'; Farès (yellow card) 26'; Parolo (yellow card) 45+1'; Correa 58'; Lucas (yellow card) 86'; Luis Alberto (yellow card) 90'	Stadium: Stadio Ezio Scida; Attendance: 0 Referee: Juan Luca Sacchi

29 November 2020 9	Lazio	1–3	Udinese	Rome
12:30 CET (UTC+1)	Farès (yellow card) 45'; Immobile 74' (pen.); Lucas (yellow card) 77'; Akpa Akpro (yellow card) 90+3'	Report	Arslan 18', (yellow card) 32'; Pereyra (yellow card) 45'; Samir (yellow card) 45+3'; Pussetto 45+3'; Forestieri 71'; Musso (yellow card) 73'	Stadium: Stadio Olimpico; Attendance: 0 Referee: Gianluca Aureliano

5 December 2020 10	Spezia	1–2	Lazio	Cesena
15:00 CET (UTC+1)	Bastoni (yellow card) 23'; Terzi (yellow card) 32'; Nzola 64'; Ricci (yellow card) 82'	Report	Immobile 15'; Milinković-Savić 33'; Akpa Akpro (yellow card) 84'	Stadium: Stadio Dino Manuzzi; Attendance: 0 Referee: Daniele Chiffi

12 December 2020 11	Lazio	1–2	Hellas Verona	Rome
20:45 CET (UTC+1)	Caicedo 56', (yellow card) 64'; Akpa Akpro (yellow card) 59'; Reina (yellow card) 68'; Marušić (yellow card) 79'; Farès (yellow card) 87'	Report	Lazzari 45' (o.g.); Tameze 67'; Salcedo (yellow card) 74'; Magnani (yellow card) 78'; Colley (yellow card) 90'	Stadium: Stadio Olimpico; Attendance: 0 Referee: Rosario Abisso

15 December 2020 12	Benevento	1–1	Lazio	Benevento
20:45 CET (UTC+1)	Tuia (yellow card) 23'; Lapadula (yellow card) 30'; Schiattarella 45', (red card) 90+3'	Report	Immobile 25'; Luiz Felipe (yellow card) 54'; Patric (yellow card) 90+4'	Stadium: Stadio Ciro Vigorito; Attendance: 0 Referee: Luca Pairetto

20 December 2020 13	Lazio	2–0	Napoli	Rome
20:45 CET (UTC+1)	Immobile 9', (yellow card) 43'; Hoedt (yellow card) 11'; Escalante (yellow card) 24'; Luis Alberto 56'; Lazzari (yellow card) 90+1'	Report	Lozano (yellow card) 13'; Koulibaly (yellow card) 30'; Lobotka (yellow card) 75'	Stadium: Stadio Olimpico; Attendance: 0 Referee: Daniele Orsato

23 December 2020 14	Milan	3–2	Lazio	Milan
20:45 CET (UTC+1)	Rebić 10'; Çalhanoğlu 17' (pen.); Krunić (yellow card) 41'; Hernandez (yellow card) 78', (goal) 90+2'	Report	Immobile (penalty missed) 28', 59'; Luis Alberto 28', (yellow card) 64'; Escalante (yellow card) 39'; Akpa Akpro (yellow card) 80'; Muriqi (yellow card) 88'	Stadium: San Siro; Attendance: 0 Referee: Marco Di Bello

3 January 2021 15	Genoa	1–1	Lazio	Genoa
15:00 CET (UTC+1)	Destro 58', (yellow card) 59'; Czyborra (yellow card) 63'	Report	Immobile 15' (pen.); Patric (yellow card) 43'; Milinković-Savić (yellow card) 60'; Lucas (yellow card) 69'; Escalante (yellow card) 90+3'	Stadium: Stadio Luigi Ferraris; Attendance: 0 Referee: Gianpaolo Calvarese

6 January 2021 16	Lazio	2–1	Fiorentina	Rome
15:00 CET (UTC+1)	Caicedo 6'; Luiz Felipe (yellow card) 43'; Escalante (yellow card) 45'; Immobile 75'; Hoedt (yellow card) 88'	Report	Castrovilli (yellow card) 82'; Vlahović 88' (pen.)	Stadium: Stadio Olimpico; Attendance: 0 Referee: Rosario Abisso

10 January 2021 17	Parma	0–2	Lazio	Parma
15:00 CET (UTC+1)	Busi (yellow card) 23'; Brugman (yellow card) 28'; Hernani (yellow card) 63'; Balogh (yellow card) 66'	Report	Luis Alberto 55'; Caicedo 67'; Akpa Akpro (yellow card) 69'	Stadium: Stadio Ennio Tardini; Attendance: 0 Referee: Luca Pairetto

15 January 2021 18	Lazio	3–0	Roma	Rome
20:45 CET (UTC+1)	Milinković-Savić (yellow card) 11'; Immobile 14'; Radu (yellow card) 20'; Luis Alberto 23', 67'; Acerbi (yellow card) 45+3'; Luiz Felipe (yellow card) 62'; Lucas (yellow card) 63'	Report	Mancini (yellow card) 34'; Smalling (yellow card) 60'; Pedro (yellow card) 71'; Mkhitaryan (yellow card) 90'	Stadium: Stadio Olimpico; Attendance: 0 Referee: Daniele Orsato

24 January 2021 19	Lazio	2–1	Sassuolo	Rome
18:00 CET (UTC+1)	Milinković-Savić 25'; Patric (yellow card) 59'; Immobile 71'; Lucas (yellow card) 75'	Report	Caputo 6'; Marlon (yellow card) 65'; Obiang (yellow card) 68'; Ferrari (yellow card) 90+2'	Stadium: Stadio Olimpico; Attendance: 0 Referee: Antonio Giua

31 January 2021 20	Atalanta	1–3	Lazio	Bergamo
15:00 CET (UTC+1)	Pašalić 79'	Report	Marušić 3'; Patric (yellow card) 23'; Correa 51'; Musacchio (yellow card) 58'; Muriqi 82'	Stadium: Gewiss Stadium; Attendance: 0 Referee: Daniele Chiffi

7 February 2021 21	Lazio	1–0	Cagliari	Rome
20:45 CET (UTC+1)	Immobile 61'; Correa (yellow card) 69'; Parolo (yellow card) 87'	Report	Nández (yellow card) 31'; João Pedro (yellow card) 82'	Stadium: Stadio Olimpico; Attendance: 0 Referee: Massimiliano Irrati

14 February 2021 22	Internazionale	3–1	Lazio	Milan
20:45 CET (UTC+1)	Lukaku 22' (pen.), 45', (yellow card) 26'; Hakimi (yellow card) 59'; Martínez 64'	Report	Hoedt (yellow card) 20'; Milinković-Savić 61'	Stadium: San Siro; Attendance: 0 Referee: Michael Fabbri

20 February 2021 23	Lazio	1–0	Sampdoria	Rome
15:00 CET (UTC+1)	Luis Alberto 24'; Lulić (yellow card) 45'; Marušić (yellow card) 82'; Escalante (yellow card) 89'; Patric (yellow card) 90+4'	Report	Silva (yellow card) 35'; Ekdal (yellow card) 60'; Colley (yellow card) 74'	Stadium: Stadio Olimpico; Attendance: 0 Referee: Davide Massa

27 February 2021 24	Bologna	2–0	Lazio	Bologna
18:00 CET (UTC+1)	Danilo (yellow card) 9'; Mbaye 19'; Sansone 64'	Report	Immobile (penalty missed) 17'; Patric (yellow card) 40'; Hoedt (yellow card) 81'	Stadium: Stadio Renato Dall'Ara; Attendance: 0 Referee: Piero Giacomelli

6 March 2021 26	Juventus	3–1	Lazio	Turin
20:45 CET (UTC+1)	Rabiot 39'; Morata 57', 60' (pen.)	Report	Correa 14'; Acerbi (yellow card) 80'	Stadium: Allianz Stadium; Attendance: 0 Referee: Davide Massa

12 March 2021 27	Lazio	3–2	Crotone	Rome
15:00 CET (UTC+1)	Milinković-Savić 14'; Luis Alberto 39'; Caicedo 84'	Report	Simy 29', 50' (pen.); Djidji (yellow card) 53'; Rispoli (yellow card) 78'; Petriccione (yellow card) 83'	Stadium: Stadio Olimpico; Attendance: 0 Referee: Antonio Rapuano

21 March 2021 28	Udinese	0–1	Lazio	Udine
15:00 CET (UTC+1)	Molina (yellow card) 58'	Report	Marušić 37'; Patric (yellow card) 82'; Musacchio (yellow card) 87'; Pereira (yellow card) 90+2'	Stadium: Stadio Friuli; Attendance: 0 Referee: Fabio Maresca

3 April 2021 29	Lazio	2–1	Spezia	Rome
15:00 CEST (UTC+2)	Pereira (yellow card) 30'; Lazzari 56', (red card) 90+6'; Correa (yellow card) 77' (yellow-red card) 90+8'; Caicedo 88' (pen.)	Report	Chabot (yellow card) 20'; Verde 73'; Nzola (yellow card) 90+4'; Agudelo (yellow card) 90+6'	Stadium: Stadio Olimpico; Attendance: 0 Referee: Antonio Giua

11 April 2021 30	Hellas Verona	0–1	Lazio	Verona
15:00 CEST (UTC+2)		Report	Caicedo (yellow card) 49'; Luis Alberto (yellow card) 72'; Milinković-Savić 90+2'	Stadium: Stadio Marcantonio Bentegodi; Attendance: 0 Referee: Daniele Chiffi

18 April 2021 31	Lazio	5–3	Benevento	Rome
15:00 CEST (UTC+2)	Depaoli 10' (o.g.); Immobile 20', 90+6', (penalty missed) 55'; Correa 36' (pen.); Montipò 48' (o.g.); Akpa Akpro (yellow card) 70'; Parolo (yellow card) 90+3'	Report	Montipò (yellow card) 35'; Sau 45'; Schiattarella (yellow card) 50'; Glik (yellow card) 53', (goal) 85'; Viola 62' (pen.)	Stadium: Stadio Olimpico; Attendance: 0 Referee: Davide Ghersini

22 April 2021 32	Napoli	5–2	Lazio	Naples
20:45 CEST (UTC+2)	Insigne 7' (pen.), 53'; Politano 12'; Manolas (yellow card) 15'; Fabián (yellow card) 42'; Mertens (yellow card) 45+1', (goal) 65'; Di Lorenzo (yellow card) 73'; Osimhen 80'	Report	Milinković-Savić (yellow card) 6', (goal) 74'; Lucas (yellow card) 30'; Immobile (yellow card) 48', (goal) 70'; Pereira (yellow card) 75'	Stadium: Stadio San Paolo; Attendance: 0 Referee: Marco Di Bello

26 April 2021 33	Lazio	3–0	Milan	Rome
20:45 CEST (UTC+2)	Correa 2', 51'; Acerbi (yellow card) 19'; Milinković-Savić (yellow card) 57'; Immobile 87'	Report		Stadium: Stadio Olimpico; Attendance: 0 Referee: Daniele Orsato

2 May 2021 34	Lazio	4–3	Genoa	Rome
12:30 CEST (UTC+2)	Correa 30', 56'; Immobile 43' (pen.); Lucas (yellow card) 45'; Luis Alberto 48'; Cataldi (yellow card) 79'; Farès (yellow card) 81'	Report	Biraschi (yellow card) 32'; Radovanović (yellow card) 43'; Marušić 47' (o.g.); Masiello (yellow card) 70'; Scamacca 80' (pen.); Shomurodov 81'; Cassata (yellow card) 90+2'	Stadium: Stadio Olimpico; Attendance: 0 Referee: Piero Giacomelli

8 May 2021 35	Fiorentina	2–0	Lazio	Florence
20:45 CEST (UTC+2)	Venuti (yellow card) 5'; Vlahović 32', 89', (yellow card) 44'; Pezzella (yellow card) 58'; Cáceres (yellow card) 90+2'	Report	Acerbi (yellow card) 28'; Lucas (yellow card) 60'; Radu (yellow card) 66'; Luiz Felipe (yellow card) 74'; Pereira (yellow card) 77' (yellow-red card) 90+5'; Cataldi (yellow card) 90+1'; Akpa Akpro (yellow card) 90+6'	Stadium: Stadio Artemio Franchi; Attendance: 0 Referee: Fabio Maresca

12 May 2021 36	Lazio	1–0	Parma	Rome
20:45 CEST (UTC+2)	Acerbi (yellow card) 90'; Immobile 90+5'	Report	Brunetta (yellow card) 10'; Gagliolo (yellow card) 49'; Hernani (yellow card) 90+2'	Stadium: Stadio Olimpico; Attendance: 0 Referee: Federico Dionisi

15 May 2021 37	Roma	2–0	Lazio	Rome
20:45 CEST (UTC+2)	Peres (yellow card) 16'; Mkhitaryan 42'; Santon (yellow card) 47'; Pedro 78'	Report	Acerbi (yellow card) 23' (yellow-red card) 87'	Stadium: Stadio Olimpico; Attendance: 0 Referee: Luca Pairetto

18 May 2021 25	Lazio	0–0	Torino	Rome
20:30 CEST (UTC+2)	Strakosha (yellow card) 28'; Luis Alberto (yellow card) 50'; Luiz Felipe (yellow card) 61'; Pereira (yellow card) 81'; Immobile (penalty missed) 84'	Report		Stadium: Stadio Olimpico; Attendance: 0 Referee: Michael Fabbri
Note: The match was originally scheduled for 2 March 2021, but was abandoned after Torino were banned from travelling to Rome, as they were under a quarantine order from the Turin health authority after eight Torino players tested positive for COVID-19 amid its pandemic in Italy. On 24 April, the match was rescheduled to 18 May 2021.

23 May 2021 38	Sassuolo	2–0	Lazio	Reggio Emilia
20:45 CEST (UTC+2)	Kyriakopoulos 10', (yellow card) 50' (yellow-red card) 61'; Berardi 78' (pen.)	Report	Parolo (yellow card) 90+3'	Stadium: Mapei Stadium; Attendance: 0 Referee: Alessandro Prontera

=== Coppa Italia ===
21 January 2021 Round of 16	Lazio	2–1	Parma	Rome
21:15 CET (UTC+1)	Parolo 23'; Colombi 90' (o.g.)	Report	Mihăilă 83'	Stadium: Stadio Olimpico; Referee: Giovanni Ayroldi

27 January 2021 Quarter-finals	Atalanta	3–2	Lazio	Bergamo
17:45 CET (UTC+1)	Djimsiti 7'; Romero (yellow card) 11'; Malinovskyi (yellow card) 16', (goal) 37'; Palomino (red card) 53'; Miranchuk 57'; Zapata (penalty missed) 66'	Report	Muriqi 17'; Patric (yellow card) 22'; Farès (yellow card) 22'; Acerbi 34'; Escalante (yellow card) 57'	Stadium: Gewiss Stadium; Referee: Luca Pairetto

=== UEFA Champions League ===
==== Group stage ====
The group stage draw was held on 1 October 2020.

Pos	Team	Pld	W	D	L	GF	GA	GD	Pts	Qualification	DOR	LAZ	BRU	ZEN
1	(Germany) Borussia Dortmund	6	4	1	1	12	5	+7	13	Advance to knockout phase	—	1–1	3–0	2–0
2	(Italy) Lazio	6	2	4	0	11	7	+4	10	Advance to knockout phase	3–1	—	2–2	3–1
3	(Belgium) Club Brugge	6	2	2	2	8	10	−2	8	Transfer to Europa League	0–3	1–1	—	3–0
4	(Russia) Zenit Saint Petersburg	6	0	1	5	4	13	−9	1		1–2	1–1	1–2	—

Source: UEFA
Rules for classification: Group stage tiebreakers

20 October 2020 1	Lazio (Italy)	3–1	(Germany) Borussia Dortmund	Rome, Italy
21:00 CEST (UTC+2)	Immobile 6'; Hitz 23' (o.g.); Luis Alberto (yellow card) 42'; Akpa Akpro 76'; Strakosha (yellow card) 84'	Report	Reyna (yellow card) 62'; Delaney (yellow card) 62'; Haaland 71'	Stadium: Stadio Olimpico; Attendance: 1,000; Referee: Clément Turpin (France)

28 October 2020 2	Club Brugge (Belgium)	1–1	(Italy) Lazio	Bruges, Belgium
21:00 CET (UTC+1)	Diatta (yellow card) 32'; Vanaken 42' (pen.); Dennis (yellow card) 69'; Rits (yellow card) 88'	Report	Correa 14'; Farès (yellow card) 35'; Patric (yellow card) 40'; Hoedt (yellow card) 45'; Akpa Akpro (yellow card) 59'; Czyż (yellow card) 76'	Stadium: Jan Breydel Stadium; Attendance: 0 (Note: Due to the COVID-19 pandemic in Europe, the match was played behind closed doors.); Referee: Anthony Taylor (England)

4 November 2020 3	Zenit Saint Petersburg (Russia)	1–1	(Italy) Lazio	Saint Petersburg, Russia
18:55 CET (UTC+1)	Kuzyayev (yellow card) 7'; Yerokhin 32'; Barrios (yellow card) 78'; Lovren (yellow card) 85'; Krugovoy (yellow card) 86'	Report	Akpa Akpro (yellow card) 5'; Milinković-Savić (yellow card) 59'; Caicedo (yellow card) 78', (goal) 82'; Reina (yellow card) 85'	Stadium: Krestovsky Stadium; Attendance: 17,427; Referee: Artur Soares Dias (Portugal)

24 November 2020 4	Lazio (Italy)	3–1	(Russia) Zenit Saint Petersburg	Rome, Italy
21:00 CET (UTC+1)	Immobile 3', 55' (pen.); Parolo 22'; Acerbi (yellow card) 89'	Report	Dzyuba 25'; Barrios (yellow card) 38'; Lovren (yellow card) 48'; Rakitskiy (yellow card) 76'	Stadium: Stadio Olimpico; Attendance: 0 Referee: Michael Oliver (England)

2 December 2020 5	Borussia Dortmund (Germany)	1–1	(Italy) Lazio	Dortmund, Germany
21:00 CET (UTC+1)	Guerreiro 44'	Report	Immobile 67' (pen.)	Stadium: Westfalenstadion; Attendance: 0 Referee: Antonio Mateu Lahoz (Spain)

8 December 2020 6	Lazio (Italy)	2–2	(Belgium) Club Brugge	Rome, Italy
18:55 CET (UTC+1)	Correa 12'; Immobile 27' (pen.); Hoedt (yellow card) 36'; Marušić (yellow card) 90'	Report	Sobol (yellow card) 2' (yellow-red card) 39'; Vormer 15'; Vanaken 76'	Stadium: Stadio Olimpico; Attendance: 0 Referee: Cüneyt Çakır (Turkey)

==== Knockout phase ====
===== Round of 16 =====
The draw for the round of 16 was held on 14 December 2020.

23 February 2021 First leg	Lazio (Italy)	1–4	(Germany) Bayern Munich	Rome, Italy
21:00 CET (UTC+1)	Luis Alberto (yellow card) 28'; Correa 49', (yellow card) 57'; Lucas (yellow card) 51'; Marušić (yellow card) 65'; Escalante (yellow card) 69'	Report	Lewandowski 9'; Musiala 24'; Sané 42'; Acerbi 47' (o.g.); Kimmich (yellow card) 72'; Coman (yellow card) 75'	Stadium: Stadio Olimpico; Attendance: 0 Referee: Orel Grinfeld (Israel)

17 March 2021 Second leg	Bayern Munich (Germany)	2–1 (6–2 agg.)	(Italy) Lazio	Munich, Germany
21:00 CET (UTC+1)	Lewandowski 33' (pen.); Goretzka (yellow card) 48'; Choupo-Moting 73'	Report	Radu (yellow card) 26'; Acerbi (yellow card) 31'; Milinković-Savić (yellow card) 39'; Correa (yellow card) 70'; Parolo 82'	Stadium: Allianz Arena; Attendance: 0 Referee: István Kovács (Romania)

== Statistics ==
=== Appearances and goals ===
No.	Pos	Nat	Player	Total		Serie A		Coppa Italia		Champions League	
No.	Pos	Nat	Player	Apps	Goals	Apps	Goals	Apps	Goals	Apps	Goals
Goalkeepers
1	GK	(Albania) ALB	Thomas Strakosha	11	0	9	0	1	0	1	0
25	GK	(Spain) ESP	Pepe Reina	36	0	29	0	1	0	6	0
71	GK	(Albania) ALB	Marco Alia	0	0	0	0	0	0	0	0
Defenders
3	DF	(Brazil) BRA	Luiz Felipe	18	1	10+4	0	0	0	2+2	1
4	DF	(Spain) ESP	Patric	33	0	18+7	0	1+1	0	6	0
13	DF	(Italy) ITA	Nicolò Armini	1	0	0+1	0	0	0	0	0
14	DF	(Netherlands) NED	Wesley Hoedt	26	0	10+7	0	2	0	5+2	0
26	DF	(Romania) ROU	Ștefan Radu	32	0	30+1	0	0	0	0+1	0
33	DF	(Italy) ITA	Francesco Acerbi	41	0	32	0	2	0	7	0
37	DF	(Argentina) ARG	Mateo Musacchio	5	0	2+2	0	0	0	1	0
77	DF	(Montenegro) MNE	Adam Marušić	45	2	33+3	2	1+1	0	7	0
Midfielders
6	MF	(Brazil) BRA	Lucas Leiva	37	0	30+2	0	0	0	5	0
7	MF	(Brazil) BRA	Andreas Pereira	32	1	3+23	1	2	0	0+4	0
8	MF	(Netherlands) NED	Djavan Anderson	4	0	1+2	0	0+1	0	0	0
10	MF	(Spain) ESP	Luis Alberto	39	9	33+1	9	0	0	5	0
16	MF	(Italy) ITA	Marco Parolo	24	2	7+11	0	1+1	1	3+1	1
18	MF	(Argentina) ARG	Gonzalo Escalante	29	1	4+20	1	2	0	0+3	0
19	MF	(Bosnia and Herzegovina) BIH	Senad Lulić	19	0	8+8	0	0+2	0	0+1	0
21	MF	(Serbia) SRB	Sergej Milinković-Savić	40	8	32	8	2	0	6	0
29	MF	(Italy) ITA	Manuel Lazzari	38	2	30+2	2	1+1	0	3+1	0
32	MF	(Italy) ITA	Danilo Cataldi	22	0	4+15	0	0	0	0+3	0
50	MF	(Italy) ITA	Marco Bertini	1	0	0+1	0	0	0	0	0
53	MF	(Poland) POL	Szymon Czyż	1	0	0	0	0	0	0+1	0
92	MF	(Ivory Coast) CIV	Jean-Daniel Akpa Akpro	41	1	6+26	0	2	0	2+5	1
96	MF	(Algeria) ALG	Mohamed Farès	28	0	12+9	0	2	0	4+1	0
Forwards
11	FW	(Argentina) ARG	Joaquín Correa	37	11	25+3	8	0+2	0	7	3
17	FW	(Italy) ITA	Ciro Immobile	41	25	34+1	20	0+1	0	5	5
20	FW	(Ecuador) ECU	Felipe Caicedo	30	9	9+16	8	0	0	1+4	1
65	FW	(Spain) ESP	Raul Moro	1	0	0+1	0	0	0	0	0
94	FW	(Kosovo) KOS	Vedat Muriqi	33	2	7+20	1	2	1	1+3	0
Players transferred out during the season
15	DF	(Angola) ANG	Bastos	2	0	0+2	0	0	0	0	0
24	GK	(Belgium) BEL	Silvio Proto	0	0	0	0	0	0	0	0
80	MF	(Morocco) MAR	Sofian Kiyine	0	0	0	0	0	0	0	0
93	DF	(Slovakia) SVK	Denis Vavro	1	0	0+1	0	0	0	0	0

Last updated: 23 May 2021
Source: Competitions

=== Goalscorers ===
As of 12 May 2021

Rank	No.	Pos.	Nat.	Name	Serie A	Coppa Italia	Champions League	Total
1	17	FW	(Italy)	Ciro Immobile	20	0	5	25
2	11	FW	(Argentina)	Joaquín Correa	8	0	3	11
3	10	FW	(Spain)	Luis Alberto	9	0	0	9
3	20	FW	(Ecuador)	Felipe Caicedo	8	0	1	9
5	21	MF	(Serbia)	Sergej Milinković-Savić	8	0	0	8
6	16	MF	(Italy)	Marco Parolo	0	1	2	3
7	29	MF	(Italy)	Manuel Lazzari	2	0	0	2
7	77	MF	(Montenegro)	Adam Marušić	2	0	0	2
7	94	FW	(Kosovo)	Vedat Muriqi	1	1	0	2
10	7	MF	(Brazil)	Andreas Pereira	1	0	0	1
10	33	DF	(Italy)	Francesco Acerbi	0	1	0	1
10	92	MF	(Ivory Coast)	Jean-Daniel Akpa Akpro	0	0	1	1
Own goals					2	1	1	4
Totals					56	4	13	73
