= Samuele Parlati =

Italian footballer (born 1997)

Personal information
- Date of birth: 5 February 1997 (age 29)
- Place of birth: Gallipoli, Italy
- Height: 1.74 m (5 ft 9 in)
- Position: Midfielder

Team information
- Current team: Alcione Milano
- Number: 21

Youth career
- Taviano
- –2011: Gallipoli
- 2011–2015: Lecce
- 2015–2016: Ascoli

Senior career*
Years	Team	Apps	(Gls)
2014–2015	Lecce	0	(0)
2016–2019	Ascoli	5	(1)
2016–2017	→ Paganese (loan)	18	(1)
2019	→ Bisceglie (loan)	17	(1)
2019–2021	Fano	45	(7)
2021	Catanzaro	7	(0)
2021–2024	Monterosi	103	(5)
2024–2026	AlbinoLeffe	68	(12)
2026–	Alcione Milano	1	(0)
- * Club domestic league appearances and goals as of 21 August 2026

Samuele Parlati (born 5 February 1997) is an Italian professional footballer who plays as a midfielder for Serie C Group A club Alcione Milano.

In February 2023, during a Serie C game against Giugliano, he became one of the several outfield players to have ever saved a penalty kick while playing in goal.

== Club career ==
=== Early career and Ascoli ===
Born in Gallipoli, Parlati started his playing career at local clubs Taviano and Gallipoli, before entering the youth sector of Lecce in 2011, and then joining Ascoli in 2015. The following year, he took part with Ascoli's under-19 squad in the Torneo di Viareggio.

==== Paganese (loan) ====
After signing a pre-contract with Ascoli, in August 2016 Parlati was sent out on a season-long loan to Lega Pro side Paganese. He made his league debut for the club on 4 September 2016, starting in a 2–1 loss to Matera. On 19 April 2017, he scored his first professional goal, coming off the bench and rounding up a 0–4 league win over Taranto.

At the end of the season, in May 2017, he signed his first professional contract with Ascoli, penning a three-year deal.

==== Return to Ascoli ====
On 28 October 2017, Parlati made his debut for Ascoli, starting and playing 90 minutes in a 3–0 Serie B defeat to Bari. On 4 November, he scored his first goal for the club in a 4–2 league defeat to Carpi.

In the evening of 11 March 2018, following a 1–0 league loss to Venezia, he was attacked and threatened, together with team-mate Vincenzo Venditti, by a group of Ascoli ultras. Both players received support from the AIC, as well as local authorities, including Bishop of Ascoli Piceno Giovanni D'Ercole.

==== Bisceglie (loan) ====
Having found limited game time at Ascoli, on 10 January 2019 Parlati joined Serie C side Bisceglie on loan until the end of the 2018–19 season. The club would eventually get relegated to Serie D, after losing the last play-out match to Lucchese on penalties.

=== Fano and Catanzaro ===
On 26 July 2019, he joined fellow third-tier club Fano on a permanent deal, signing a two-year contract. Since the 2019–20 season was cut short due to the COVID-19 pandemic, his side was involved in a relegation play-off against Ravenna: Parlati scored in the first leg, which was won by Fano (2–0), as the team went on to win the second leg, as well (0–1), thus avoiding relegation from the third tier.

On 1 February 2021, Parlati joined Serie C side Catanzaro on a permanent deal, as part of a swap deal that saw Francesco Urso go in the opposite direction. He went on to make his debut for the club on 7 March, coming on as a substitute during the second half of a goalless league draw against Teramo.

=== Monterosi ===
On 27 July 2021, he signed permanently for newly promoted Serie C side Monterosi. He then made his debut for the club on 28 August, starting in a goalless league draw against Foggia, which was his side's first ever game in a professional league. In his first league campaign at the club, Monterosi reached the promotional play-offs, although they were eliminated in the first round, following a 2–2 draw with Virtus Francavilla, which went through due to their better ranking in the regular season.

Having featured regularly in his first two seasons at Monterosi, Parlati extended his contract with the club in January 2023, signing a new deal until 2026. On 12 February of the same year, in the injury time of a league match against Giugliano, the midfielder volunteered to play in goal, after goalkeeper Marco Alia had been sent off; he managed both to save the subsequent penalty kick by Francesco Salvemini and keep a clean sheet, as his side eventually gained a 2–0 victory through a last-minute goal by Filippo Tolomello.

Parlati left the club at the end of the 2023–24 season, following their relegation to Serie D.

=== AlbinoLeffe ===
On 6 July 2024, Parlati joined Serie C club AlbinoLeffe on a free transfer.

== International career ==
In 2011, Parlati took part in a training camp with the staff of the Italian under-15 national team.

== Career statistics ==
=== Club ===
As of match played 19 May 2024

Club	Season	League			Coppa Italia		Other		Total	
Club	Season	Division	Apps	Goals	Apps	Goals	Apps	Goals	Apps	Goals
Lecce	2014–15	Lega Pro	0	0	0	0	0	0	0	0
Ascoli	2015-16	Serie B	0	0	0	0	0	0	0	0
Ascoli	2016-17	Serie B	0	0	0	0	0	0	0	0
Ascoli	2017-18	Serie B	4	1	0	0	0	0	4	1
Ascoli	2018-19	Serie B	1	0	1	0	0	0	2	0
Ascoli	Total		5	1	1	0	0	0	6	1
Paganese (loan)	2016-17	Lega Pro	17	1	—		2 (Note: Appearance(s) in the Coppa Italia Serie C and promotion play-offs.)	0	19	1
Bisceglie (loan)	2018-19	Serie C	14	0	—		3 (Note: Appearance(s) in relegation play-offs.)	1	17	1
Fano	2019–20	Serie C	25	4	—		4 (Note: Appearance(s) in the Coppa Italia Serie C and relegation play-offs.)	1	29	5
Fano	2020–21	Serie C	18	2	—		0	0	18	2
Fano			43	6	0	0	4	1	47	7
Catanzaro	2020–21	Serie C	4	0	—		2 (Note: Appearance(s) in promotion play-offs.)	0	6	0
Monterosi	2021–22	Serie C	32	2	—		2	0	34	2
Monterosi	2022–23	Serie C	34	1	—		0	0	34	1
Monterosi	2023–24	Serie C	34	2	—		2	0	36	2
Monterosi	Total		100	3	0	0	4	0	104	5
Career total			183	13	1	0	15	2	199	15
