= Szymon Czyż =

Polish footballer (born 2001)

Personal information
- Full name: Szymon Czyż
- Date of birth: 8 July 2001 (age 25)
- Place of birth: Puck, Poland
- Height: 1.76 m (5 ft 9 in)
- Position: Midfielder

Team information
- Current team: Widzew Łódź
- Number: 55

Youth career
- 2010–2015: Arka Gdynia
- 2015–2018: Lech Poznań
- 2018–2020: Lazio

Senior career*
Years	Team	Apps	(Gls)
2020–2021	Lazio	0	(0)
2021–2022	Warta Poznań	15	(0)
2022–2025	Raków Częstochowa	16	(0)
2023	Raków Częstochowa II	1	(0)
2023–2024	→ Górnik Zabrze (loan)	24	(4)
2025–	Widzew Łódź	29	(0)

International career
2017–2018	Poland U17	5	(1)
2019	Poland U19	3	(0)
2021	Poland U20	3	(0)
2021	Poland U21	2	(0)
- * Club domestic league appearances and goals as of 17:09, 29 May 2026 (UTC)

Szymon Czyż (born 8 July 2001) is a Polish professional footballer who plays as a midfielder for Ekstraklasa club Widzew Łódź.

== Professional career ==
A youth product of Arka Gdynia and Lech Poznań, Czyż signed with Lazio in 2018. Czyż made his professional debut with Lazio in a 1–1 UEFA Champions League draw against Club Brugge on 28 October 2020. He moved on a permanent transfer to Warta Poznań in the summer of 2021.

On 10 January 2022, he was transferred to Raków Częstochowa, signing a three-and-a-half-year deal. On 11 September 2022, shortly after obtaining a regular spot in Raków's starting line-up, he suffered an anterior cruciate ligament tear in a 4–0 league win against Legia Warsaw, ruling him out for at least six months.

On 26 August 2023, he joined Górnik Zabrze on a one-year loan. After re-establishing himself as a regular for Górnik in April 2024, who were at the time the team with the most league points earned since the start of the year, Czyż suffered another ACL tear, this time in the first half of a 5–0 away loss to Cracovia on 3 May.

On 24 February 2025, Czyż moved to another Ekstraklasa side Widzew Łódź on an eighteen-month contract with an option for another season. In late January 2026, he tore his ACL for the third time. On 29 January, despite his injury, Widzew exercised their option to extend Czyż's contract until June 2027.

== Career statistics ==
As of match played 6 December 2025

Appearances and goals by club, season and competition
Club	Season	League			National cup (Note: Includes Polish Cup)		Continental		Other		Total	
Club	Season	Division	Apps	Goals	Apps	Goals	Apps	Goals	Apps	Goals	Apps	Goals
Lazio	2020–21	Serie A	0	0	0	0	1 (Note: Appearance in UEFA Champions League)	0	—		1	0
Warta Poznań	2021–22	Ekstraklasa	15	0	1	0	—		—		16	0
Raków Częstochowa	2021–22	Ekstraklasa	8	0	1	0	—		—		9	0
Raków Częstochowa	2022–23	Ekstraklasa	8	0	0	0	6 (Note: Appearances in UEFA Europa Conference League)	0	1 (Note: Appearance in Polish Super Cup)	0	15	0
Raków Częstochowa	2023–24	Ekstraklasa	0	0	0	0	1	0	0	0	1	0
Raków Częstochowa	2024–25	Ekstraklasa	0	0	0	0	—		—		0	0
Raków Częstochowa	Total		16	0	1	0	7	0	1	0	24	0
Raków Częstochowa II	2023–24	III liga, group III	1	0	—		—		—		1	0
Górnik Zabrze (loan)	2023–24	Ekstraklasa	24	4	2	0	—		—		26	4
Widzew Łódź	2024–25	Ekstraklasa	11	0	—		—		—		11	0
Widzew Łódź	2025–26	Ekstraklasa	18	0	2	0	—		—		20	0
Widzew Łódź	Total		29	0	2	0	—		—		31	0
Career total			85	4	6	0	8	0	1	0	100	4

== Honours ==
Raków Częstochowa

- Ekstraklasa: 2022–23
- Polish Cup: 2021–22
- Polish Super Cup: 2022
