= Rrok Toma =

Albanian footballer (born 2004)

Personal information
- Date of birth: 27 February 2004 (age 22)
- Place of birth: Lezhë, Albania
- Height: 1.84 m (6 ft 0 in)
- Position: Centre-forward

Team information
- Current team: Vllaznia Shkodër
- Number: 25

Youth career
- 2013–2018: Brians
- 2018–2019: Lombardia Uno
- 2019–2021: Torino
- 2021–2023: AlbinoLeffe

Senior career*
Years	Team	Apps	(Gls)
2022–2025	AlbinoLeffe	6	(0)
2024–2025	→ Teuta (loan)	32	(2)
2025–	Partizani	32	(5)
2026–	→ Vllaznia Shkodër (loan)	0	(0)

International career^{‡}
2018–2019	Albania U15	5	(1)
2020	Albania U16	2	(0)
2020	Albania U17	1	(2)
2022	Albania U19	7	(3)
2023–	Albania U21	7	(0)
- * Club domestic league appearances and goals as of 13 May 2026 ‡ National team caps and goals as of 12 November 2025

Rrok Toma (born 27 February 2004) is an Albanian professional footballer who plays as a centre-forward for Albanian club Partizani.
