= Marco Alia =

Albanian footballer (born 2000)

Personal information
- Full name: Marco Alia
- Date of birth: 26 April 2000 (age 26)
- Place of birth: Genzano di Roma, Italy
- Height: 1.82 m (6 ft 0 in)
- Position: Goalkeeper

Team information
- Current team: Skënderbeu Korçë
- Number: 71

Youth career
- –2015: Nuova Tor Tre Teste
- 2015–2020: Lazio

Senior career*
Years	Team	Apps	(Gls)
2020–2022	Lazio	0	(0)
2021–2022	→ Monterosi (loan)	26	(0)
2022–2023	Monterosi	20	(0)
2023–	Skënderbeu Korçë	76	(0)

International career^{‡}
2018	Albania U19	6	(0)
2021	Albania U21	2	(0)
- * Club domestic league appearances and goals as of 8 November 2025 ‡ National team caps and goals as of 4 September 2021

Marco Alia (Albanian: Marko Alia, Albanian pronunciation: [ˈmarko aˈlia]; born 26 April 2000) is a professional footballer who plays as a goalkeeper for Skënderbeu Korçë in the Kategoria e Parë.

Born in Genzano di Roma, Italy, Alia began his career in the youth academy of Nuova Tor Tre Teste before joining the Lazio youth system, where he progressed through all age categories and eventually earned promotion to the senior squad. He later played for Monterosi in Serie C, before moving to Albania to join Skënderbeu Korçë in 2024.

== Club career ==
=== Early career and Lazio ===
Alia began playing football with local amateur side Nuova Tor Tre Teste, a club known for developing young talent in the Rome area. His performances at youth level caught the attention of Lazio, who recruited him into their academy around 2015. He progressed through the club's youth ranks and became the starting goalkeeper for the Primavera team. In 2020, Alia was promoted to Lazio's senior squad, serving as third-choice goalkeeper behind Pepe Reina and his compatriot Thomas Strakosha. He was officially part of the first-team squad during the 2020–21 Serie A season, although he did not make a competitive appearance, but featured regularly in training sessions under coach Simone Inzaghi and was included on the bench for several Serie A and Coppa Italia matches.

=== Monterosi ===
On 21 July 2021, Alia renewed his contract with Lazio and joined newly promoted Monterosi on a season-long loan in Serie C. He became a regular starter, making 26 appearances across all competitions. His consistent performances led Monterosi to secure his permanent transfer from Lazio ahead of the 2022–23 season, during which he made a further 20 appearances.

=== Skënderbeu Korçë ===
In June 2023, Alia completed a move to Skënderbeu Korçë in the Kategoria Superiore, signing a contract valid until 2026.

Alia quickly became the club's starting goalkeeper and one of its most influential players, noted for his leadership and consistency. He made his competitive debut for the club on 26 August 2023, in the Kategoria Superiore opening match against Egnatia, keeping a clean sheet in a 1–0 away win, although receiving a yellow card in stoppage time.

He followed that with another clean sheet in the following match, a 1–0 home victory over Dinamo City, once again earning a late yellow card for time-wasting.

On 1 October 2023, in the seventh round of the league, Alia was named man of the match in Skënderbeu's 1–0 home win over Partizani Tirana, producing several decisive saves and earning praise in the Albanian media.

Throughout the season, Alia played every match except for week 22, when she was suspended for yellow card accumulation, completing the remaining 35 league games. He recorded 12 clean sheets in total, playing a decisive role in Skënderbeu's strong campaign that saw the club finish fourth in the standings with 51 points — one ahead of rivals Tirana and Teuta Durrës — securing qualification for the Final Four championship phase. In the Final Four held in mid-May 2024, Alia played both matches in full 90-minutes, and Skënderbeu were narrowly defeated 1–0 by Partizani Tirana in the semi-finals, but secured third place after a 3–2 victory over Vllaznia Shkodër in the placement match.

During the same season, Alia also featured in the Albanian Cup, where he was sent off in the round of 16 match against Teuta Durrës on 24 January 2024 for a reckless challenge in the 41st minute, with Skënderbeu eventually losing 2–0 and being eliminated from the competition.

In the following 2024–25 Kategoria Superiore season, Alia remained ever-present between the posts, making 35 league appearances and keeping seven clean sheets. Despite his consistency, Skënderbeu endured a difficult campaign and finished second from bottom in the table, suffering relegation to the Kategoria e Parë.

Following the departure of Elvis Prençi, he was appointed team captain ahead of the 2025–26 season under coach Ernest Gjoka.

By late 2025, Alia had accumulated over 70 appearances in all competitions for the club, becoming a cornerstone of Skënderbeu's lineup.

== International career ==
Alia was born in Genzano di Roma to Albanian parents and holds both Italian and Albanian citizenship. He has represented Albania at various Albania youth levels, making six appearances for the Albania U19 in 2018 during the UEFA Euro 2019 qualification campaign. He later earned two caps for the U21 side in 2021 during the UEFA Euro 2023 qualification, continuing his involvement with the national setup.

== Style of play ==
Alia is 1.82 m tall and an agile goalkeeper, known for his shot-stopping, reflexes, and command of the penalty area. He is comfortable with the ball at his feet and shows good distribution skills. In a 2021 interview with the Albanian Football Federation, he stated that, while he has no specific idol, he models his game after German goalkeeper Manuel Neuer.

== Career statistics ==
=== Club ===
As of match played 27 April 2025

Appearances and goals by club, season and competition
Club	Season	League			Cup		Other		Total	
Club	Season	Division	Apps	Goals	Apps	Goals	Apps	Goals	Apps	Goals
Lazio	2018–19	Serie A	0	0	0	0	—		0	0
Lazio	2019–20	Serie A	0	0	0	0	—		0	0
Lazio	2020–21	Serie A	0	0	0	0	—		0	0
Lazio	Total		0	0	0	0	—		0	0
Monterosi (loan)	2021–22	Serie C – Group C	27	0	0	0	—		27	0
Monterosi	2022–23	Serie C – Group C	20	0	0	0	—		20	0
Monterosi	Total		47	0	0	0	—		47	0
Skënderbeu Korçë	2023–24	Kategoria Superiore	35	0	0	0	2 (Note: Appearance(s) in Kategoria Superiore final four round)	0	37	0
Skënderbeu Korçë	2024–25	Kategoria Superiore	35	0	0	0	—		35	0
Skënderbeu Korçë	2025–26	Kategoria e Parë	4	0	0	0	—		4	0
Skënderbeu Korçë	Total		74	0	0	0	2	0	76	0
Career total			121	0	0	0	2	0	123	0
