= Bill Mellor (footballer) =

English association & rugby league footballer

Personal information
- Full name: William Gladstone Mellor
- Date of birth: 3 April 1886
- Place of birth: Stockport, England
- Date of death: 21 July 1938 (aged 52)
- Place of death: Barrow-in-Furness, England
- Position: Goalkeeper

Senior career*
Years	Team	Apps	(Gls)
1908–1910	Carlisle United		
1910–1914	Norwich City		
1914–1920	Newcastle United	23	(0)
Rugby league career
Playing information
Club
Years	Team	Pld	T	G	FG	P
190?–08	Barrow
- * Club domestic league appearances and goals

William Gladstone Mellor (3 April 1886 — 21 July 1938) was an English footballer who played as a goalkeeper.

== Career ==
Mellor began his sporting career in rugby league, playing for Barrow. In 1908, Mellor made the switch to football, signing for Carlisle United. In 1910, Mellor joined Norwich City. In January 1914, Mellor signed for Newcastle United for a fee of £765. At Newcastle, Mellor made 25 appearances in all competitions, appearing 23 times in the First Division.

== Later life and death ==
Mellor late emigrated to New Zealand in 1924, before returning to England six years later. On 21 July 1938, Mellor died in Barrow-in-Furness.
