= 2019–20 SS Lazio season =

Lazio
2019–20 season
- President: Claudio Lotito
- Manager: Simone Inzaghi
- Stadium: Stadio Olimpico
- Serie A: 4th
- Coppa Italia: Quarter-finals
- Supercoppa Italiana: Winners
- UEFA Europa League: Group stage
- Top goalscorer: League: Ciro Immobile (36); All: Ciro Immobile (39)
- Biggest win: 4–0 vs Genoa; 4–0 vs Torino; 5–1 vs Sampdoria; 5–1 vs SPAL; 5–1 vs Hellas Verona
- Biggest defeat: 0–3 vs Milan
Home colours	Away colours	Third colours

The 2019–20 season was the 119th season in Società Sportiva Lazio's history and their 32nd consecutive season in the top-flight of Italian football.

Lazio won their fifth Supercoppa Italiana title by a score of 3–1 over Juventus. Ciro Immobile was the top goalscorer in Serie A, winning the European Golden Shoe and tying the all-time league record with 36 goals.

== Players ==
=== Squad information ===
As of 29 February 2020

No.	Name	Nat	Position(s)	Date of birth (age)	Signed from	Signed in	Contract ends	Apps.	Goals	Notes
Goalkeepers
1	Thomas Strakosha	(Albania)	GK	19 March 1995 (age 31)	(Italy) Youth Sector	2013	2022	120	0	
23	Guido Guerrieri	(Italy)	GK	25 February 1996 (age 30)	(Italy) Youth Sector	2014	2021	1	0	
24	Silvio Proto	(Belgium)	GK	23 May 1983 (age 43)	(Greece) Olympiacos	2018	2021	2	0	
Defenders
2	Wallace	(Brazil)	CB	14 October 1994 (age 31)	(Portugal) Braga	2016	2021	54	1	
3	Luiz Felipe	(Brazil)	CB	22 March 1997 (age 29)	(Brazil) Ituano	2016	2022	54	2	
4	Patric	(Spain)	RB / RWB / RM / CM	17 April 1993 (age 33)	(Spain) Barcelona	2015	2022	66	0	
5	Jordan Lukaku	(Belgium)	LB / LWB / LM	25 July 1994 (age 32)	(Belgium) Oostende	2016	2019	55	1	
15	Bastos	(Angola)	CB	27 March 1991 (age 35)	(Russia) Rostov	2016	2020	58	6	
26	Ștefan Radu	(Romania)	LB / CB	22 October 1986 (age 39)	(Romania) Dinamo București	2008	2021	300	5	
33	Francesco Acerbi	(Italy)	CB	10 February 1988 (age 38)	(Italy) Sassuolo	2018	2023	61	5	
77	Adam Marušić	(Montenegro)	RB / RWB / RM	17 October 1992 (age 33)	(Belgium) Oostende	2017	2022	68	6	
93	Denis Vavro	(Slovakia)	CB	10 April 1996 (age 30)	(Denmark) Copenhagen	2019	2024	5	0	
Midfielders
6	Lucas Leiva	(Brazil)	DM	9 January 1987 (age 39)	(England) Liverpool	2017	2020	85	2	
10	Luis Alberto	(Spain)	AM / SS / LW	28 September 1992 (age 33)	(England) Liverpool	2016	2022	95	20	
11	Joaquín Correa	(Argentina)	AM / LW / ST	13 August 1994 (age 32)	(Spain) Sevilla	2018	2023	56	12	
16	Marco Parolo	(Italy)	CM	25 January 1985 (age 41)	(Italy) Parma	2014	2020	181	26	Vice-captain
19	Senad Lulić	(Bosnia and Herzegovina)	LM / LB / LWB	18 January 1986 (age 40)	(Switzerland) Young Boys	2011	2020	266	28	Captain
21	Sergej Milinković-Savić	(Serbia)	CM / AM	27 February 1995 (age 31)	(Belgium) Genk	2015	2022	150	26	
22	Jony	(Spain)	LW / LM	9 July 1991 (age 35)	(Spain) Málaga	2019	2023	15	0	
28	André Anderson	(Brazil)	AM / SS	23 September 1999 (age 26)	(Brazil) Santos Reserves and Academy	2018	2023	2	0	
29	Manuel Lazzari	(Italy)	RM / RW / RB	29 November 1993 (age 32)	(Italy) SPAL	2019	2024	21	0	
32	Danilo Cataldi	(Italy)	CM / DM	6 August 1994 (age 32)	(Italy) Youth Sector	2013	2020	73	5	
Forwards
17	Ciro Immobile	(Italy)	ST	20 February 1990 (age 36)	(Spain) Sevilla	2016	2022	120	96	
20	Felipe Caicedo	(Ecuador)	ST	5 September 1988 (age 38)	(Spain) Espanyol	2017	2020	71	19	
34	Bobby Adekanye	(Nigeria)	RW / LW / AM	14 February 1999 (age 27)	(England) Liverpool	2019	2022	3	1	
Players transferred during the season
7	Valon Berisha	(Kosovo)	CM	7 February 1993 (age 33)	(Austria) Red Bull Salzburg	2017	2021	11	0	
14	Riza Durmisi	(Denmark)	LB / LWB	8 January 1994 (age 32)	(Spain) Real Betis	2018	2023	10	0	

== Transfers ==
=== In ===
Date	Pos.	Player	Age	Moving from	Fee	Notes	Source
3 July 2019	FW	(Netherlands) Bobby Adekanye	20	(England) Liverpool	Free		
4 July 2019	DF	(Slovakia) Denis Vavro	23	(Denmark) Copenhagen	€10.5M	€10.5M with €9M paid up front	
12 July 2019	MF	(Italy) Manuel Lazzari	25	(Italy) SPAL	€10M	€10M + Alessandro Murgia	
12 July 2019	DF	(Cyprus) Andreas Karo	22	(Cyprus) Apollon Limassol	Undisclosed		
17 July 2019	DF	(Albania) Angelo Ndrecka	17	(Italy) Chievo	Undisclosed		
17 July 2019	MF	(Morocco) Sofian Kiyine	21	(Italy) Chievo	Undisclosed		
23 July 2019	MF	(Spain) Jony	28	(Spain) Málaga	€2.5M		
3 August 2019	MF	(Italy) Fabio Maistro	21	(Italy) Rieti	Undisclosed		
23 August 2019	MF	(Poland) Patryk Dziczek	21	(Poland) Piast Gliwice	Undisclosed		
2 September 2019	FW	(Ivory Coast) Cedric Gondo	22	(Italy) Rieti	Undisclosed		
17 January 2020	MF	(Italy) Andrea Marino	18	(Italy) Salernitana	Undisclosed		
30 January 2020	FW	(Italy) Emanuele Cicerelli	25	(Italy) Salernitana	Undisclosed		

==== Loans in ====
Date	Pos.	Player	Age	Moving from	Fee	Notes	Source
30 July 2019	DF	(Brazil) Gustavo Cipriano	18	(Brazil) Santos U20	Loan	Loan with an option to buy	
31 January 2020	DF	(Italy) Ludovico Ricci	18	(Italy) Viterbese Castrense	Loan	Loan with an option to buy	

=== Out ===
Date	Pos.	Player	Age	Moving to	Fee	Notes	Source
10 July 2019	DF	(Italy) Giorgio Spizzichino	19	(Italy) Pro Patria	Undisclosed		
12 July 2019	MF	(Italy) Alessandro Murgia	22	(Italy) SPAL	Free	Manuel Lazzari deal	
17 July 2019	FW	(Italy) Cristiano Lombardi	23	(Italy) Salernitana	Undisclosed		
2 August 2019	MF	(Portugal) Bruno Jordão	20	(England) Wolverhampton	Undisclosed		
2 August 2019	FW	(Portugal) Pedro Neto	19	(England) Wolverhampton	Undisclosed		
11 August 2019	FW	(Spain) Mamadou Tounkara	23	(Italy) Viterbese Castrense	Undisclosed		
30 August 2019	DF	(Uruguay) Martín Cáceres	32	(Italy) Fiorentina	Free		

==== Loans out ====
Date	Pos.	Player	Age	Moving to	Fee	Notes	Source
9 July 2019	FW	(Italy) Simone Palombi	23	(Italy) Cremonese	None		
17 July 2019	MF	(Morocco) Sofian Kiyine	21	(Italy) Salernitana	None		
17 July 2019	FW	(Italy) Cristiano Lombardi	24	(Italy) Salernitana	Loan	Loan until the end of the 2020–21 season	
19 July 2019	DF	(Cyprus) Andreas Karo	22	(Italy) Salernitana	None		
19 July 2019	FW	(Italy) Alessandro Rossi	22	(Italy) Juve Stabia	None		
24 July 2019	DF	(Italy) Davide Di Gennaro	31	(Italy) Juve Stabia	None		
31 July 2019	GK	(Lithuania) Marius Adamonis	22	(Italy) Catanzaro	None		
3 August 2019	MF	(Italy) Fabio Maistro	21	(Italy) Salernitana	None		
5 August 2019	MF	(Croatia) Milan Badelj	30	(Italy) Fiorentina	€700,000	Loan with an option to buy for €4.3M	
28 August 2019	MF	(Poland) Patryk Dziczek	21	(Italy) Salernitana	None		
2 September 2019	DF	(Brazil) Wallace	24	(Portugal) Braga	None		
2 September 2019	FW	(Ivory Coast) Cedric Gondo	22	(Italy) Salernitana	None		
6 December 2019	DF	(Denmark) Riza Durmisi	25	(France) Nice	None		
30 January 2020	DF	(Argentina) Tiago Casasola	24	(Italy) Cosenza	None		
30 January 2020	MF	(Kosovo) Valon Berisha	26	(Germany) Fortuna Düsseldorf	None		
31 January 2020	FW	(Italy) Emanuele Cicerelli	25	(Italy) Salernitana	Loan	Loan until the end of the 2020–2021 season	

== Pre-season and friendlies ==
Win Draw Loss

14 July 2019 Friendly	Lazio	18–0	Auronzo	Auronzo di Cadore, Italy
17:00 CEST (UTC+2)	Correa 6', 31', 40'; Parolo 11', 54'; Lucas 13'; Caicedo 23', 29'; Acerbi 33', 70'; Luis Alberto 46', 56', 72'; Anderson 56'; Patric 66', 78'; Adekanye 74', 75'	Report		Stadium: Stadio Rodolfo Zandegiacomo; Referee: Alberto Gaz

17 July 2019 Friendly	Lazio	12–0	Top 11 Radio Club 103	Auronzo di Cadore, Italy
17:00 CEST (UTC+2)	Cataldi 16'; Immobile 24', 37'; Caicedo 28'; Adekanye 43'; Correa 49', 51', 63' (pen.), 65'; Jony 56' (pen.); Anderson 75', 80'	Report		Stadium: Stadio Rodolfo Zandegiacomo; Referee: Ivano Dikollari

21 July 2019 Friendly	Lazio	5–2	Triestina	Auronzo di Cadore, Italy
17:00 CEST (UTC+2)	Immobile 8'; Correa 13' (pen.); Milinković-Savić 29'; Caicedo 50', 67'	Report	Codromaz 46'; Marzola 86'	Stadium: Stadio Rodolfo Zandegiacomo; Referee: Dario Duzel

24 July 2019 Friendly	Lazio	5–0	Virtus Entella	Auronzo di Cadore, Italy
17:00 CEST (UTC+2)	Luis Alberto 8'; Correa 39', 60'; Patric 46', 75'	Report		Stadium: Stadio Rodolfo Zandegiacomo; Referee: Bogdan Sfira

27 July 2019 Friendly	Lazio	4–0	Mantova	Auronzo di Cadore, Italy
16:00 CEST (UTC+2)	André 28'; Immobile 37'; Milinković-Savić 43'; Caicedo 58'	Report		Stadium: Stadio Rodolfo Zandegiacomo; Referee: Andrea Dal Col

2 August 2019 Friendly	Bournemouth (England)	3–4	(Italy) Lazio	Bournemouth, England
19:45 BST (UTC+1)	Lerma 20'; Solanke 31'; Stacey 82'	Report	Correa 14', 75'; Luis Alberto 48'; Parolo 55'	Stadium: Dean Court; Referee: Peter Bankes (England)

3 August 2019 Friendly	SC Paderborn (Germany)	2–4	(Italy) Lazio	Paderborn, Germany
16:00 CEST (UTC+2)	Antwi-Adjei 67'; Cauly 88'	Report	Caicedo 19'; Cataldi 33'; Jans 42' (o.g.); Lulić 89'	Stadium: Benteler-Arena; Attendance: 5,809; Referee: Sven Watsdritzki

7 August 2019 Friendly	Lazio (Italy)	5–1	(Saudi Arabia) Al-Shabab	Marienfeld, Germany
10:00 CEST (UTC+2)	Caicedo 7'; Jony 19'; Correa 41'; Immobile 58'; Adekanye 73'	Report	Sebá 30'	Stadium: Hotel-Residence Klosterpforte; Referee: René Gimmler

10 August 2019 Trofeo Memorial Quinocho	Celta Vigo (Spain)	1–2	(Italy) Lazio	Vigo, Spain
20:00 CEST (UTC+2)	Beltrán 39'	Report	Immobile 7', 25'	Stadium: Balaídos; Referee: Pablo González Fuertes (Spain)

20 June 2020 Friendly	Lazio	7–2	Ternana	Auronzo di Cadore, Italy
18:30 CEST (UTC+2)	Milinković-Savić 6'; Caicedo 9'; Immobile 20', 60'; Vavro 61', 75'; Falbo 90'	Report	Vantaggiato 10'; Verna 50'	Stadium: Stadio Rodolfo Zandegiacomo; Attendance: 0

== Competitions ==
=== Supercoppa Italiana ===
22 December 2019	Juventus	1–3	Lazio	Riyadh, Saudi Arabia
19:45 AST	Matuidi (yellow card) 9'; Dybala 45'; Bentancur (yellow card) 48' (yellow-red card) 90+3'	Report	Luis Alberto 16', (yellow card) 58'; Lucas (yellow card) 35'; Lulić 73'; Cataldi (yellow card) 90+2', (goal) 90+4'	Stadium: King Saud University Stadium; Attendance: 23,361; Referee: Gianpaolo Calvarese

=== Serie A ===
==== League table ====
Pos	Team	Pld	W	D	L	GF	GA	GD	Pts	Qualification or relegation
2	Internazionale	38	24	10	4	81	36	+45	82	Qualification for the Champions League group stage
3	Atalanta	38	23	9	6	98	48	+50	78 (Note: Atalanta finished ahead of Lazio on head-to-head points: Lazio 3–3 Atalanta, Atalanta 3–2 Lazio.)	Qualification for the Champions League group stage
4	Lazio	38	24	6	8	79	42	+37	78	Qualification for the Champions League group stage
5	Roma	38	21	7	10	77	51	+26	70	Qualification for the Europa League group stage
6	Milan	38	19	9	10	63	46	+17	66	Qualification for the Europa League second qualifying round

Source: Serie A, Soccerway
Rules for classification: 1) Points; 2) Head-to-head points; 3) Head-to-head goal difference; 4) Goal difference; 5) Goals scored; 6) Draw. (Note: Head-to-head record is used only after all the matches between the teams in question have been played)

==== Results summary ====
Overall								Home						Away					
Pld	W	D	L	GF	GA	GD	Pts	W	D	L	GF	GA	GD	W	D	L	GF	GA	GD
38	24	6	8	79	42	+37	78	14	3	2	46	17	+29	10	3	6	33	25	+8

Last updated: 1 August 2020.
Source: Competitive matches

==== Results by round ====
Round	1	2	3	4	5	6	7	8	9	10	11	12	13	14	15	16	17	18	19	20	21	22	23	24	25	26	27	28	29	30	31	32	33	34	35	36	37	38
Ground	A	H	A	H	A	H	A	H	A	H	A	H	A	H	H	A	H	A	H	H	A	H	A	H	A	H	A	H	A	H	A	H	A	A	H	A	H	A
Result	W	D	L	W	L	W	D	D	W	W	W	W	W	W	W	W	D	W	W	W	D	W	W	W	W	W	L	W	W	L	L	L	D	L	W	W	W	L
Position	2	4	9	5	9	6	6	7	6	5	4	3	3	3	3	3	3	3	3	3	3	3	3	2	2	2	2	2	2	2	2	3	4	4	4	4	4	4

Updated to match(es) played on 1 August 2020. Source: Competitive matches
A = Away; H = Home; W = Win; D = Draw; L = Loss

==== Matches ====
25 August 2019 1	Sampdoria	0–3	Lazio	Genoa
20:45 CEST (UTC+02:00)	Ekdal (yellow card) 25'; Murru (yellow card) 59'	Report	Lazzari (yellow card) 21'; Immobile 37', 62'; Acerbi (yellow card) 43'; Correa 56'	Stadium: Stadio Luigi Ferraris; Attendance: 19,500; Referee: Gianluca Rocchi

1 September 2019 2	Lazio	1–1	Roma	Rome
18:00 CEST (UTC+02:00)	Luiz Felipe (yellow card) 25'; Immobile (yellow card) 55'; Luis Alberto 59'; Radu (yellow card) 63'; Acerbi (yellow card) 76'	Report	Kolarov 17' (pen.); Zaniolo (yellow card) 31'; Florenzi (yellow card) 70'; Santon (yellow card) 84'	Stadium: Stadio Olimpico; Attendance: 50,000; Referee: Marco Guida

15 September 2019 3	SPAL	2–1	Lazio	Ferrara
15:00 CEST (UTC+02:00)	Tomović (yellow card) 16'; Missiroli (yellow card) 51'; Petagna 63'; Espeto (yellow card) 64'; Felipe (yellow card) 85'; Kurtić 90+2'; Di Francesco (yellow card) 90+6'	Report	Immobile 17' (pen.); Patric (yellow card) 26'; Radu (yellow card) 79'; Acerbi (yellow card) 89'	Stadium: Stadio Paolo Mazza; Attendance: 13,650; Referee: Gianpaolo Calvarese

22 September 2019 4	Lazio	2–0	Parma	Rome
20:45 CEST (UTC+02:00)	Immobile 8'; Lucas (yellow card) 47'; Marušić 67'	Report	Kulusevski (yellow card) 24'; Barillà (yellow card) 61'; Iacoponi (yellow card) 90+1'	Stadium: Stadio Olimpico; Attendance: 20,000; Referee: Rosario Abisso

25 September 2019 5	Internazionale	1–0	Lazio	Milan
21:00 CEST (UTC+02:00)	D'Ambrosio 23', (yellow card) 45+2'; Martínez (yellow card) 90'	Report	Luis Alberto (yellow card) 31'; Bastos (yellow card) 73'; Parolo (yellow card) 81'	Stadium: San Siro; Attendance: 56,175; Referee: Fabio Maresca

29 September 2019 6	Lazio	4–0	Genoa	Rome
15:00 CEST (UTC+02:00)	Milinković-Savić 7'; Radu 40'; Caicedo 59', (yellow card) 90+1'; Immobile 78'	Report	El Yamiq (yellow card) 29'; Sanabria (yellow card) 74'	Stadium: Stadio Olimpico; Attendance: 22,000; Referee: Luca Pairetto

6 October 2019 7	Bologna	2–2	Lazio	Bologna
15:00 CEST (UTC+02:00)	Krejčí 21', (yellow card) 27'; Palacio 31', (yellow card) 89'; Sansone (yellow card) 63'; Danilo (yellow card) 64'; Medel (red card) 70'; Bani (yellow card) 75'	Report	Luiz Felipe (yellow card) 20'; Immobile 23', 39'; Lucas (yellow card) 51' (yellow-red card) 60'; Lulić (yellow card) 79'	Stadium: Stadio Renato Dall'Ara; Attendance: 22,052; Referee: Daniele Orsato

19 October 2019 8	Lazio	3–3	Atalanta	Rome
15:00 CEST (UTC+02:00)	Marušić (yellow card) 27'; Parolo (yellow card) 33'; Lulić (yellow card) 49'; Immobile 69' (pen.), 90+3' (pen.), (yellow card) 90+3'; Correa 70'; Milinković-Savić (yellow card) 80'	Report	Muriel 23', 28'; Gómez 37'; Gollini (yellow card) 58'; Toloi (yellow card) 60'	Stadium: Stadio Olimpico; Attendance: 30,000; Referee: Gianluca Rocchi

27 October 2019 9	Fiorentina	1–2	Lazio	Florence
20:45 CET (UTC+01:00)	Chiesa 28'; Ranieri (yellow card) 41' (yellow-red card) 90+6'; Castrovilli (yellow card) 68'; Pulgar (yellow card) 73'; Pezzella (yellow card) 90+2'; Ribéry (red card) 90+7'	Report	Correa 22'; Luis Alberto (yellow card) 43'; Lulić (yellow card) 45+2'; Immobile 89'; Parolo (yellow card) 90+4'; Vavro (red card) 90+8'	Stadium: Stadio Artemio Franchi; Attendance: 33,281; Referee: Marco Guida
Note: Franck Ribéry and Denis Vavro were sent off for fighting after the end of the match.

30 October 2019 10	Lazio	4–0	Torino	Rome
21:00 CET (UTC+01:00)	Acerbi 25', (yellow card) 55'; Immobile 33', 70' (pen.); Marušić (yellow card) 67'; Belotti 90' (o.g.)	Report	Nkoulou (yellow card) 21' (yellow-red card) 68'	Stadium: Stadio Olimpico; Attendance: 20,500; Referee: Daniele Orsato

3 November 2019 11	Milan	1–2	Lazio	Milan
20:45 CET (UTC+01:00)	Bastos 28' (o.g.); Duarte (yellow card) 51'; Krunić (yellow card) 55'; Bennacer (yellow card) 87'	Report	Immobile 25'; Milinković-Savić (yellow card) 43'; Parolo (yellow card) 64'; Radu (yellow card) 64'; Lucas (yellow card) 70'; Correa 83'; Cataldi (yellow card) 88'	Stadium: San Siro; Attendance: 41,000; Referee: Gianpaolo Calvarese

10 November 2019 12	Lazio	4–2	Lecce	Rome
15:00 CET (UTC+01:00)	Correa 30', 80'; Lucas (yellow card) 34'; Milinković-Savić 62'; Immobile (yellow card) 69', (goal) 78' (pen.)	Report	Mancosu (yellow card) 4'; Lapadula 40', (yellow card) 59'; Lucioni (yellow card) 69'; La Mantia 85'	Stadium: Stadio Olimpico; Attendance: 35,000; Referee: Gianluca Manganiello

24 November 2019 13	Sassuolo	1–2	Lazio	Reggio Emilia
15:00 CET (UTC+01:00)	Peluso (yellow card) 16'; Caputo 45'	Report	Lulić (yellow card) 24'; Immobile 34'; Luiz Felipe (yellow card) 44'; Bastos (yellow card) 79'; Caicedo 90+1'	Stadium: Mapei Stadium – Città del Tricolore; Attendance: 10,000; Referee: Daniele Chiffi

1 December 2019 14	Lazio	3–0	Udinese	Rome
15:00 CET (UTC+01:00)	Immobile 9', 36' (pen.); Luis Alberto 45+1' (pen.)	Report	Troost-Ekong (yellow card) 36'	Stadium: Stadio Olimpico; Attendance: 20,000; Referee: Marco Di Bello

7 December 2019 15	Lazio	3–1	Juventus	Rome
20:45 CET (UTC+01:00)	Luis Alberto (yellow card) 6'; Luiz Felipe 45+1'; Lazzari (yellow card) 63'; Milinković-Savić 74'; Lucas (yellow card) 86'; Caicedo 90+5', (yellow card) 90+6'	Report	Pjanić (yellow card) 11'; Ronaldo 25'; Dybala (yellow card) 37'; Cuadrado (red card) 69'; Szczęsny (yellow card) 77'	Stadium: Stadio Olimpico; Attendance: 65,000; Referee: Michael Fabbri

16 December 2019 16	Cagliari	1–2	Lazio	Cagliari
20:45 CET (UTC+01:00)	Simeone 8'; Nández (yellow card) 21'; Klavan (yellow card) 32'; Ioniță (yellow card) 46'; Pisacane (yellow card) 56'	Report	Luis Alberto (yellow card) 20', (goal) 90+3'; Cataldi (yellow card) 69'; Caicedo 90+8', (yellow card) 90+9'	Stadium: Sardegna Arena; Attendance: 16,299; Referee: Fabio Maresca

5 January 2020 18	Brescia	1–2	Lazio	Brescia
12:30 CET (UTC+01:00)	Balotelli 18', (yellow card) 47'; Cistana (yellow card) 35', (red card) 40'; Tonali (yellow card) 43'; Bisoli (yellow card) 57'; Chancellor (yellow card) 86'	Report	Immobile 42' (pen.), 90+1'; Radu (yellow card) 56'; Parolo (yellow card) 57'; Jony (yellow card) 65'; Cataldi (yellow card) 72'	Stadium: Stadio Mario Rigamonti; Attendance: 14,370; Referee: Gianluca Manganiello

11 January 2020 19	Lazio	1–0	Napoli	Rome
18:00 CET (UTC+01:00)	Lazzari (yellow card) 27'; Lulić (yellow card) 41'; Immobile 82'	Report	Manolas (yellow card) 38'; Mário Rui (yellow card) 85'	Stadium: Stadio Olimpico; Attendance: 40,000; Referee: Daniele Orsato

18 January 2020 20	Lazio	5–1	Sampdoria	Rome
15:00 CET (UTC+01:00)	Caicedo 7'; Immobile 17' (pen.), 20', 65' (pen.); Bastos 54'; Adekanye (yellow card) 69'	Report	Vieira (yellow card) 31'; Colley (yellow card) 62'; Linetty 70'; Chabot (red card) 74'	Stadium: Stadio Olimpico; Attendance: 30,000; Referee: Daniele Chiffi

26 January 2020 21	Roma	1–1	Lazio	Rome
18:00 CET (UTC+01:00)	Džeko 26', (yellow card) 53'; Kolarov (yellow card) 87'	Report	Acerbi 34'; Luiz Felipe (yellow card) 40'; Milinković-Savić (yellow card) 64'; Lulić (yellow card) 82'; Immobile (yellow card) 90+3'	Stadium: Stadio Olimpico; Attendance: 59,902; Referee: Gianpaolo Calvarese

2 February 2020 22	Lazio	5–1	SPAL	Rome
15:00 CET (UTC+01:00)	Immobile 3', 29'; Caicedo 16', 38'; Milinković-Savić (yellow card) 44'; Adekanye 58'	Report	Di Francesco (yellow card) 61'; Missiroli 65', (yellow card) 80'	Stadium: Stadio Olimpico; Attendance: 40,000; Referee: Antonio Giua

5 February 2020 17	Lazio	0–0	Hellas Verona	Rome
20:45 CET (UTC+01:00)	Milinković-Savić (yellow card) 29'; Jony (yellow card) 77'; Radu (yellow card) 80'	Report	Kumbulla (yellow card) 23'; Rrahmani (yellow card) 87'	Stadium: Stadio Olimpico; Attendance: 40,000; Referee: Rosario Abisso
Note: Match was originally postponed to 8 January because of Lazio's participation in the 2019 Supercoppa Italiana, and was further postponed to 5 February.

9 February 2020 23	Parma	0–1	Lazio	Parma
18:00 CET (UTC+01:00)	Kucka (yellow card) 35'; Caprari (yellow card) 67'; Alves (yellow card) 90+1'	Report	Caicedo 41', (yellow card) 56'; Lucas (yellow card) 58'	Stadium: Stadio Ennio Tardini; Attendance: 17,859; Referee: Marco Di Bello

16 February 2020 24	Lazio	2–1	Internazionale	Rome
20:45 CET (UTC+01:00)	Immobile 50' (pen.); Lucas (yellow card) 51'; Luiz Felipe (yellow card) 58'; Milinković-Savić 69', (yellow card) 90+4'; Lazzari (yellow card) 90'	Report	Young 44'; De Vrij (yellow card) 48'; Godín (yellow card) 79'	Stadium: Stadio Olimpico; Attendance: 61,000; Referee: Gianluca Rocchi

23 February 2020 25	Genoa	2–3	Lazio	Genoa
12:30 CET (UTC+01:00)	Masiello (yellow card) 28'; Cassata 57'; Soumaoro (yellow card) 69'; Criscito 89' (pen.)	Report	Marušić 2'; Lucas (yellow card) 20'; Immobile 51'; Cataldi 71'; Strakosha (yellow card) 75'	Stadium: Stadio Luigi Ferraris; Attendance: 24,032; Referee: Fabio Maresca

29 February 2020 26	Lazio	2–0	Bologna	Rome
15:00 CET (UTC+01:00)	Luis Alberto 18'; Correa 21'; Radu (yellow card) 83'	Report	Bani (yellow card) 4'; Schouten (yellow card) 11'; Danilo (yellow card) 54'; Santander (yellow card) 64'	Stadium: Stadio Olimpico; Attendance: 45,000; Referee: Rosario Abisso

24 June 2020 27	Atalanta	3–2	Lazio	Bergamo
21:45 CEST (UTC+02:00)	Gosens 38'; Toloi (yellow card) 52'; De Roon (yellow card) 56'; Malinovskyi 66'; Palomino 80'	Report	De Roon 5' (o.g.); Milinković-Savić 11', (yellow card) 72'; Patric (yellow card) 85'	Stadium: Stadio Atleti Azzurri d'Italia; Attendance: 0 Referee: Daniele Orsato
Note: Match was postponed to 15 March, then to 24 June, from its original date of 7 March due to schedule shuffling to allow for previous postponements to be played due to concerns over the COVID-19 pandemic. On 9 March, all sports events in Italy were suspended until 3 April. This was the first match played since the COVID-19 pandemic lockdown in Italy.

27 June 2020 28	Lazio	2–1	Fiorentina	Rome
21:45 CEST (UTC+02:00)	Parolo (yellow card) 7'; Milinković-Savić (yellow card) 24'; Bastos (yellow card) 45'; Jony (yellow card) 55'; Immobile 67' (pen.); Radu (yellow card) 79'; Luis Alberto 83'	Report	Dalbert (yellow card) 5'; Ribéry 25'; Milenković (yellow card) 32'; Vlahović (red card) 90+5'	Stadium: Stadio Olimpico; Attendance: 0 Referee: Michael Fabbri

30 June 2020 29	Torino	1–2	Lazio	Turin
19:30 CEST (UTC+02:00)	Belotti 5' (pen.); Verdi (yellow card) 45'	Report	Immobile (yellow card) 4', (goal) 48'; Caicedo (yellow card) 29'; Parolo 73'; Lukaku (yellow card) 74'	Stadium: Stadio Olimpico Grande Torino; Attendance: 0 Referee: Davide Massa

4 July 2020 30	Lazio	0–3	Milan	Rome
21:45 CEST (UTC+02:00)	Lukaku (yellow card) 78'	Report	Çalhanoğlu 23'; Ibrahimović 34' (pen.); Rebić 59'; Paquetá (yellow card) 82'	Stadium: Stadio Olimpico; Attendance: 0 Referee: Gianpaolo Calvarese

7 July 2020 31	Lecce	2–1	Lazio	Lecce
19:30 CEST (UTC+02:00)	Babacar 30'; Donati (yellow card) 43'; Lucioni 47'; Gabriel (yellow card) 56'; Petriccione (yellow card) 65'	Report	Caicedo 5', (yellow card) 22'; Radu (yellow card) 43'; Immobile (yellow card) 81'; Patric (red card) 90+3'	Stadium: Stadio Via del Mare; Attendance: 0 Referee: Fabio Maresca

11 July 2020 32	Lazio	1–2	Sassuolo	Rome
17:15 CEST (UTC+02:00)	Parolo (yellow card) 23'; Luis Alberto 33'; Immobile (yellow card) 42'; Bastos (yellow card) 75'; Lucas (yellow card) 85'	Report	Müldür (yellow card) 51'; Raspadori 52'; Ferrari (yellow card) 83'; Caputo 90+1'	Stadium: Stadio Olimpico; Attendance: 0 Referee: Marco Di Bello

15 July 2020 33	Udinese	0–0	Lazio	Udine
21:45 CEST (UTC+02:00)	Okaka (yellow card) 3'; Stryger Larsen (yellow card) 45+1'	Report	Caicedo (yellow card) 16'; Luiz Felipe (yellow card) 39'; Luis Alberto (yellow card) 84'	Stadium: Dacia Arena; Attendance: 0 Referee: Rosario Abisso

20 July 2020 34	Juventus	2–1	Lazio	Turin
21:45 CEST (UTC+02:00)	Ronaldo 51' (pen.), 54'; Alex Sandro (yellow card) 60'; Bonucci (yellow card) 82'; Danilo (yellow card) 88'	Report	Anderson (yellow card) 37'; Immobile 83' (pen.)	Stadium: Allianz Stadium; Attendance: 0 Referee: Daniele Orsato

23 July 2020 35	Lazio	2–1	Cagliari	Rome
21:45 CEST (UTC+02:00)	Jony (yellow card) 45+1'; Milinković-Savić 47'; Lazzari (yellow card) 50'; Immobile 60'; Parolo (yellow card) 90'	Report	Simeone 45'; Klavan (yellow card) 87'	Stadium: Stadio Olimpico; Attendance: 0 Referee: Marco Piccinini

26 July 2020 36	Hellas Verona	1–5	Lazio	Verona
19:30 CEST (UTC+02:00)	Amrabat 38' (pen.); Rrahmani (yellow card) 45+2'; Radunović (yellow card) 90+3'	Report	Immobile 45+6' (pen.), 84', 90+4' (pen.); Milinković-Savić 56'; Correa 62'; Marušić (yellow card) 67'; Strakosha (yellow card) 86'	Stadium: Stadio Marc'Antonio Bentegodi; Attendance: 0 Referee: Manuel Volpi

29 July 2020 37	Lazio	2–0	Brescia	Rome
19:30 CEST (UTC+02:00)	Correa 17'; Lazzari (yellow card) 42'; Immobile 83'	Report	Papetti (yellow card) 51'; Tonali (yellow card) 54'	Stadium: Stadio Olimpico; Attendance: 0 Referee: Luca Massimi

1 August 2020 38	Napoli	3–1	Lazio	Naples
20:45 CEST (UTC+02:00)	Fabián 9'; Koulibaly (yellow card) 15'; Insigne 54' (pen.); Mário Rui (yellow card) 69'; Politano 90+3'; Elmas (yellow card) 90+5'	Report	Immobile 22', (yellow card) 72'; Milinković-Savić (yellow card) 90+4'	Stadium: Stadio San Paolo; Attendance: 0 Referee: Gianpaolo Calvarese

=== Coppa Italia ===
14 January 2020 Round of 16	Lazio	4–0	Cremonese	Rome
17:00 CET (UTC+01:00)	Patric 10'; Parolo 26'; Luiz Felipe (yellow card) 46'; Immobile 58' (pen.); Bastos 89'	Report	Caracciolo (yellow card) 64'; Deli (yellow card) 82'	Stadium: Stadio Olimpico; Attendance: 7,789; Referee: Lorenzo Maggioni

21 January 2020 Quarter-finals	Napoli	1–0	Lazio	Naples
20:45 CET (UTC+01:00)	Insigne 2'; Hysaj (yellow card) 8' (yellow-red card) 19'	Report	Acerbi (yellow card) 14'; Lucas (yellow card) 25', (red card) 25'	Stadium: Stadio San Paolo; Attendance: 24,377; Referee: Davide Massa

=== UEFA Europa League ===
==== Group stage ====
Pos	Team	Pld	W	D	L	GF	GA	GD	Pts	Qualification	CEL	CLJ	LAZ	REN
1	(Scotland) Celtic	6	4	1	1	10	6	+4	13	Advance to knockout phase	—	2–0	2–1	3–1
2	(Romania) CFR Cluj	6	4	0	2	6	4	+2	12	Advance to knockout phase	2–0	—	2–1	1–0
3	(Italy) Lazio	6	2	0	4	6	9	−3	6		1–2	1–0	—	2–1
4	(France) Rennes	6	1	1	4	5	8	−3	4		1–1	0–1	2–0	—

Source: UEFA
Rules for classification: Group stage tiebreakers

19 September 2019 1	CFR Cluj (Romania)	2–1	(Italy) Lazio	Cluj-Napoca, Romania
18:55 CEST (UTC+02:00)	Deac 41' (pen.); Omrani 75'; Arlauskis (yellow card) 85'; Cestor (yellow card) 90+2'	Report	Bastos 25'; Lucas (yellow card) 40'; Cataldi (yellow card) 70'; Milinković-Savić (yellow card) 83'	Stadium: Stadionul Dr. Constantin Rădulescu; Attendance: 9,222; Referee: Daniel Stefański (Poland)

3 October 2019 2	Lazio (Italy)	2–1	(France) Rennes	Rome, Italy
21:00 CEST (UTC+02:00)	Cataldi (yellow card) 9'; Milinković-Savić 64'; Immobile 75'	Report	Gnagnon (yellow card) 41'; Morel 55'	Stadium: Stadio Olimpico; Attendance: 13,072; Referee: Serhiy Boyko (Ukraine)

24 October 2019 3	Celtic (Scotland)	2–1	(Italy) Lazio	Glasgow, Scotland
21:00 CEST (UTC+02:00)	Elyounoussi (yellow card) 63'; Christie 67'; Jullien (yellow card) 77', (goal) 89'; Ajer (yellow card) 90+4'	Report	Lazzari 40'; Bastos (yellow card) 76'; Cataldi (yellow card) 87'	Stadium: Celtic Park; Attendance: 56,172; Referee: Ivan Bebek (Croatia)

7 November 2019 4	Lazio (Italy)	1–2	(Scotland) Celtic	Rome, Italy
18:55 CET (UTC+01:00)	Immobile 7'; Caicedo (yellow card) 42'	Report	Forrest 38'; Brown (yellow card) 51'; Ntcham 90+5'	Stadium: Stadio Olimpico; Attendance: 26,155; Referee: Tobias Stieler (Germany)

28 November 2019 5	Lazio (Italy)	1–0	(Romania) CFR Cluj	Rome, Italy
21:00 CET (UTC+01:00)	Correa 24'; Adekanye (yellow card) 57'	Report	Djoković (yellow card) 45+3'; Traoré (yellow card) 68'	Stadium: Stadio Olimpico; Attendance: 7,604; Referee: Ali Palabıyık (Turkey)

12 December 2019 6	Rennes (France)	2–0	(Italy) Lazio	Rennes, France
18:55 CET (UTC+01:00)	Gnagnon 31', 87'; Nyamsi (yellow card) 47'; Salin (yellow card) 58'	Report	Luis Alberto (yellow card) 58'; Jony (yellow card) 84'; Cataldi (yellow card) 89'	Stadium: Roazhon Park; Attendance: 25,082; Referee: Srđan Jovanović (Serbia)

== Statistics ==
=== Appearances and goals ===
No.	Pos	Nat	Player	Total		Serie A		Supercoppa Italiana		Coppa Italia		Europa League	
No.	Pos	Nat	Player	Apps	Goals	Apps	Goals	Apps	Goals	Apps	Goals	Apps	Goals
Goalkeepers
1	GK	(Albania) ALB	Thomas Strakosha	44	0	38	0	1	0	1	0	4	0
23	GK	(Italy) ITA	Guido Guerrieri	0	0	0	0	0	0	0	0	0	0
24	GK	(Belgium) BEL	Silvio Proto	3	0	0	0	0	0	1	0	2	0
Defenders
3	DF	(Brazil) BRA	Luiz Felipe	30	1	24+2	1	1	0	2	0	1	0
4	DF	(Spain) ESP	Patric	24	1	19+2	0	0	0	1+1	1	0+1	0
5	DF	(Belgium) BEL	Jordan Lukaku	13	0	1+12	0	0	0	0	0	0	0
8	DF	(Netherlands) NED	Djavan Anderson	7	0	2+4	0	0	0	0+1	0	0	0
13	DF	(Italy) ITA	Nicolò Armini	1	0	0+1	0	0	0	0	0	0	0
15	DF	(Angola) ANG	Bastos	22	3	6+10	1	0	0	1	1	5	1
26	DF	(Romania) ROU	Ștefan Radu	31	1	28+1	1	1	0	1	0	0	0
33	DF	(Italy) ITA	Francesco Acerbi	45	2	36	2	1	0	2	0	6	0
52	DF	(Italy) ITA	Luca Falbo	2	0	0+1	0	0	0	0	0	0+1	0
77	DF	(Montenegro) MNE	Adam Marušić	15	2	10+5	2	0	0	0	0	0	0
93	DF	(Slovakia) SVK	Denis Vavro	17	0	1+10	0	0	0	0	0	6	0
Midfielders
6	MF	(Brazil) BRA	Lucas Leiva	30	0	23+2	0	1	0	1	0	3	0
10	MF	(Spain) ESP	Luis Alberto	41	7	36	6	1	1	0	0	2+2	0
11	MF	(Argentina) ARG	Joaquín Correa	35	10	22+8	9	1	0	0+1	0	3	1
16	MF	(Italy) ITA	Marco Parolo	37	2	17+12	1	0+1	0	2	1	5	0
19	MF	(Bosnia and Herzegovina) BIH	Senad Lulić	27	1	20	0	1	1	1	0	1+4	0
21	MF	(Serbia) SRB	Sergej Milinković-Savić	43	8	35+2	7	1	0	1	0	3+1	1
22	MF	(Spain) ESP	Jony	32	0	14+10	0	0	0	1+1	0	5+1	0
28	MF	(Brazil) BRA	André Anderson	7	0	0+6	0	0	0	0+1	0	0	0
29	MF	(Italy) ITA	Manuel Lazzari	40	1	29+3	0	1	0	1	0	6	1
32	MF	(Italy) ITA	Danilo Cataldi	28	2	3+18	1	0+1	1	1	0	3+2	0
34	MF	(Netherlands) NED	Bobby Adekanye	15	1	0+11	1	0	0	1	0	1+2	0
Forwards
17	FW	(Italy) ITA	Ciro Immobile	44	39	36+1	36	1	0	2	1	3+1	2
20	FW	(Ecuador) ECU	Felipe Caicedo	38	9	18+12	9	0+1	0	1	0	5+1	0
65	FW	(Spain) ESP	Raúl Moro	1	0	0+1	0	0	0	0	0	0	0
Players transferred out during the season
2	DF	(Brazil) BRA	Wallace	0	0	0	0	0	0	0	0	0	0
7	MF	(Kosovo) KOS	Valon Berisha	8	0	0+3	0	0	0	1	0	2+2	0
14	DF	(Denmark) DEN	Riza Durmisi	0	0	0	0	0	0	0	0	0	0
58	MF	(Cameroon) CMR	Joseph Minala	1	0	0	0	0	0	0+1	0	0	0

Last updated: 2 August 2020
Source: Competitions

=== Goalscorers ===
As of 2 August 2020

Rank	No.	Pos	Nat	Name	Serie A	Supercoppa	Coppa Italia	UEFA EL	Total
1	17	FW	(Italy)	Ciro Immobile	36	0	1	2	39
2	11	MF	(Argentina)	Joaquín Correa	9	0	0	1	10
3	20	FW	(Ecuador)	Felipe Caicedo	9	0	0	0	9
4	21	MF	(Serbia)	Sergej Milinković-Savić	7	0	0	1	8
5	10	MF	(Spain)	Luis Alberto	6	1	0	0	7
6	15	DF	(Angola)	Bastos	1	0	1	1	3
7	32	MF	(Italy)	Danilo Cataldi	1	1	0	0	2
7	33	DF	(Italy)	Francesco Acerbi	2	0	0	0	2
7	77	DF	(Montenegro)	Adam Marušić	2	0	0	0	2
7	16	MF	(Italy)	Marco Parolo	1	0	1	0	2
11	3	DF	(Brazil)	Luiz Felipe	1	0	0	0	1
11	4	DF	(Spain)	Patric	0	0	1	0	1
11	19	MF	(Bosnia and Herzegovina)	Senad Lulić	0	1	0	0	1
11	26	DF	(Romania)	Ștefan Radu	1	0	0	0	1
11	29	MF	(Italy)	Manuel Lazzari	0	0	0	1	1
11	34	MF	(Netherlands)	Bobby Adekanye	1	0	0	0	1
Own goal					2	0	0	0	2
Totals					79	3	4	6	92

Last updated: 1 August 2020.

=== Clean sheets ===
Rank	No.	Pos	Nat	Name	Serie A	Supercoppa	Coppa Italia	UEFA EL	Total
1	1	GK	(Albania)	Thomas Strakosha	9	0	0	0	9
2	24	GK	(Belgium)	Silvio Proto	0	0	1	1	2
Totals					9	0	1	1	11

Last updated: 29 February 2020

=== Disciplinary record ===
No.	Pos	Nat	Name	Serie A			Supercoppa			Coppa Italia			UEFA EL			Total		
No.	Pos	Nat	Name	Booked	(yellow card) (yellow-red card)	Sent off (straight red)	Booked	(yellow card) (yellow-red card)	Sent off (straight red)	Booked	(yellow card) (yellow-red card)	Sent off (straight red)	Booked	(yellow card) (yellow-red card)	Sent off (straight red)	Booked	(yellow card) (yellow-red card)	Sent off (straight red)
1	GK	(Albania)	Thomas Strakosha	1	0	0	0	0	0	0	0	0	0	0	0	1	0	0
3	DF	(Brazil)	Luiz Felipe	5	0	0	0	0	0	1	0	0	0	0	0	6	0	0
4	DF	(Spain)	Patric	1	0	0	0	0	0	0	0	0	0	0	0	1	0	0
15	DF	(Angola)	Bastos	2	0	0	0	0	0	0	0	0	1	0	0	3	0	0
26	DF	(Romania)	Ștefan Radu	6	0	0	0	0	0	0	0	0	0	0	0	6	0	0
33	DF	(Italy)	Francesco Acerbi	4	0	0	0	0	0	1	0	0	0	0	0	5	0	0
77	DF	(Montenegro)	Adam Marušić	2	0	0	0	0	0	0	0	0	0	0	0	2	0	0
93	DF	(Slovakia)	Denis Vavro	0	0	1	0	0	0	0	0	0	0	0	0	0	0	1
6	MF	(Brazil)	Lucas Leiva	7	1	0	1	0	0	1	0	1	1	0	0	10	1	1
10	MF	(Spain)	Luis Alberto	4	0	0	1	0	0	0	0	0	1	0	0	6	0	0
16	MF	(Italy)	Marco Parolo	5	0	0	0	0	0	0	0	0	0	0	0	5	0	0
19	MF	(Bosnia and Herzegovina)	Senad Lulić	6	0	0	0	0	0	0	0	0	0	0	0	6	0	0
21	MF	(Serbia)	Sergej Milinković-Savić	5	0	0	0	0	0	0	0	0	1	0	0	6	0	0
22	MF	(Spain)	Jony	2	0	0	0	0	0	0	0	0	1	0	0	3	0	0
29	MF	(Italy)	Manuel Lazzari	4	0	0	0	0	0	0	0	0	0	0	0	4	0	0
32	MF	(Italy)	Danilo Cataldi	3	0	0	1	0	0	0	0	0	4	0	0	8	0	0
34	MF	(Netherlands)	Bobby Adekanye	1	0	0	0	0	0	0	0	0	0	0	0	1	0	0
17	FW	(Italy)	Ciro Immobile	4	0	0	0	0	0	0	0	0	0	0	0	4	0	0
20	FW	(Ecuador)	Felipe Caicedo	4	0	0	0	0	0	0	0	0	1	0	0	5	0	0
Totals				66	1	1	3	0	0	3	0	1	10	0	0	82	1	2

Last updated: 29 February 2020
