= Guido Guerrieri =

Italian footballer

Personal information
- Date of birth: 25 February 1996 (age 30)
- Place of birth: Rome, Italy
- Height: 1.87 m (6 ft 1 1/2 in)
- Position: Goalkeeper

Team information
- Current team: Fano

Youth career
- Lazio

Senior career*
Years	Team	Apps	(Gls)
2012–2020	Lazio	1	(0)
2016–2017	→ Trapani (loan)	17	(0)
2020–2022	Salernitana	0	(0)
2022	Tsarsko Selo	2	(0)
2022–2023	Sambenedettese	14	(0)
2023–2024	Fano	22	(0)
- * Club domestic league appearances and goals as of 28 April 2024

Guido Guerrieri (born 25 February 1996) is an Italian professional footballer who plays as a goalkeeper for Eccellenza Marche club Fano.

== Club career ==
Guerrieri made his professional debut in the Serie B for Trapani on 28 August 2016 in a game against Novara. On 30 November 2017, he signed a contract with Lazio until 2021.

He made his only first-team appearance for Lazio on 20 May 2019 in a 3–3 Serie A draw with Bologna, remaining a backup for the rest of his years with the club.

On 1 September 2020 he joined Salernitana on a 2-year contract. On 18 February 2022, Guerreri's contract with Salernitana was terminated by mutual consent.

On 19 February 2022 he joined Bulgarian club Tsarko Selo.

On 24 August 2022 he joined AS Sambenedettese on a 1-year contract.

== Career statistics ==
=== Club ===
As of match played 28 April 2024

Appearances and goals by club, season and competition
Club	Season	League			Cup		Europe		Other		Total	
Club	Season	Division	Apps	Goals	Apps	Goals	Apps	Goals	Apps	Goals	Apps	Goals
Lazio	2012–13	Serie A	0	0	0	0	0	0	—		40	11
Lazio	2013–14	Serie A	0	0	0	0	0	0	—		40	11
Lazio	2014–15	Serie A	0	0	0	0	—		—		40	11
Lazio	2015–16	Serie A	0	0	0	0	0	0	0	0	0	0
Lazio	2017–18	Serie A	0	0	0	0	0	0	0	0	0	0
Lazio	2018–19	Serie A	1	0	0	0	0	0	—		1	0
Lazio	2019–20	Serie A	0	0	0	0	0	0	0	0	0	0
Lazio	Total		1	0	0	0	0	0	0	0	1	0
Trapani (loan)	2016–17	Serie B	17	0	2	0	—		—		19	0
Salernitana	2020–21	Serie B	0	0	0	0	—		—		0	0
Salernitana	2021–22	Serie A	0	0	0	0	—		—		0	0
Salernitana	Total		0	0	0	0	—		—		0	0
Tsarsko Selo	2021–22	First League	2	0	—		—		—		2	0
Sambenedettese	2022–23	Serie D	14	0	0	0	—		—		14	0
Fano	2023–24	Serie D	22	0	1	0	—		—		23	0
Career total			56	0	3	0	0	0	0	0	59	0

== Honours ==
Lazio

- Coppa Italia: 2018–19
- Supercoppa Italiana: 2017, 2019
