= Silvio Proto =

Belgian footballer (born 1983)

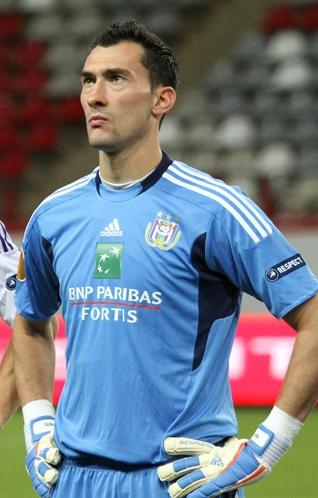
- Proto with Anderlecht in 2011

Personal information
- Full name: Silvestro Proto
- Date of birth: 23 May 1983 (age 43)
- Place of birth: Charleroi, Belgium
- Height: 1.83 m (6 ft 0 in)
- Position: Goalkeeper

Youth career
- 1989–1996: Couillet
- 1996–1999: Olympic Charleroi

Senior career*
| Years | Team | Apps | (Gls) |
| 1999–2005 | La Louvière | 115 | (0) |
| 2005–2016 | Anderlecht | 246 | (0) |
| 2008–2009 | → Germinal Beerschot (loan) | 29 | (1) |
| 2016–2017 | KV Oostende | 26 | (0) |
| 2017–2018 | Olympiacos | 23 | (0) |
| 2018–2021 | Lazio | 2 | (0) |
| Total | | 441 | (1) |

International career
| 2001 | Belgium U18 | 5 | (0) |
| 2002 | Belgium U19 | 1 | (0) |
| 2003–2005 | Belgium U21 | 9 | (0) |
| 2004–2011 | Belgium | 13 | (0) |
- * Club domestic league appearances and goals

Silvestro "Silvio" Proto (born 23 May 1983) is a Belgian former professional footballer who played as a goalkeeper.

== Club career ==
Proto spent the majority of his career with Anderlecht, for whom he made over 300 appearances, won 13 trophies and served as captain for two seasons between 2005 and 2016. His other previous clubs include R.A.C.S. Couillet, Olympic Charleroi, La Louvière, Germinal Beerschot, KV Oostende and Olympiacos.

On 28 September 2008, while playing for Germinal Beerschot, he scored a last minute equalizer in the 2–2 draw with Gent for the Belgian First Division. This goal was later awarded as Goal of the Season for 2008.

== International career ==
He has also represented the Belgium national team, earning 13 caps between 2004 and 2011. He was called up as a replacement for the injured Koen Casteels for Belgium's 2014 FIFA World Cup squad. However, he himself got injured and was then replaced by Sammy Bossut.

== Personal life ==
Proto is of part Sicilian descent and practises ventriloquism.

== Career statistics ==
=== Club ===
Appearances and goals by club, season and competition
| Club | Season | League | | | Cup | | Europe | | Other | | Total | |
| Club | Season | Division | Apps | Goals | Apps | Goals | Apps | Goals | Apps | Goals | Apps | Goals |
|---|---|---|---|---|---|---|---|---|---|---|---|---|
| Anderlecht | 2005–06 | First Division | 27 | 0 | 0 | 0 | 4 | 0 | 0 | 0 | 27 | 0 |
| Anderlecht | 2006–07 | First Division | 2 | 0 | 0 | 0 | 0 | 0 | 0 | 0 | 2 | 0 |
| Anderlecht | 2007–08 | First Division | 0 | 0 | 0 | 0 | 0 | 0 | 0 | 0 | 0 | 0 |
| Anderlecht | 2008–09 | Belgian Pro League | 0 | 0 | 0 | 0 | 0 | 0 | 0 | 0 | 0 | 0 |
| Anderlecht | 2009–10 | Belgian Pro League | 36 | 0 | 1 | 0 | 13 | 0 | 0 | 0 | 50 | 0 |
| Anderlecht | 2010–11 | Belgian Pro League | 37 | 0 | 0 | 0 | 12 | 0 | 0 | 0 | 49 | 0 |
| Anderlecht | 2011–12 | Belgian Pro League | 38 | 0 | 0 | 0 | 10 | 0 | 0 | 0 | 48 | 0 |
| Anderlecht | 2012–13 | Belgian Pro League | 39 | 0 | 5 | 0 | 10 | 0 | 0 | 0 | 54 | 0 |
| Anderlecht | 2013–14 | Belgian Pro League | 31 | 0 | 1 | 0 | 3 | 0 | 0 | 0 | 35 | 0 |
| Anderlecht | 2014–15 | Belgian Pro League | 36 | 0 | 4 | 0 | 7 | 0 | 0 | 0 | 47 | 0 |
| Anderlecht | 2015–16 | Belgian Pro League | 37 | 0 | 0 | 0 | 10 | 0 | 3 | 0 | 47 | 0 |
| Anderlecht | Total | | 246 | 0 | 11 | 0 | 69 | 0 | 3 | 0 | 329 | 0 |
| Germinal Beerschot (loan) | 2008–09 | First Division | 29 | 1 | 0 | 0 | 0 | 0 | 0 | 0 | 29 | 1 |
| KV Oostende | 2016–17 | Belgian Pro League | 21 | 0 | 1 | 0 | 0 | 0 | 0 | 0 | 22 | 0 |
| KV Oostende | 2017–18 | First Division | 5 | 0 | 0 | 0 | 2 | 0 | 0 | 0 | 7 | 0 |
| KV Oostende | Total | | 26 | 0 | 1 | 0 | 2 | 0 | 0 | 0 | 29 | 1 |
| Olympiacos | 2017–18 | Super League Greece | 23 | 0 | 2 | 0 | 5 | 0 | 0 | 0 | 30 | 0 |
| Lazio | 2018–19 | Serie A | 2 | 0 | 0 | 0 | 4 | 0 | 0 | 0 | 6 | 0 |
| Lazio | 2019–20 | Serie A | 0 | 0 | 1 | 0 | 2 | 0 | 0 | 0 | 3 | 0 |
| Lazio | 2020–21 | Serie A | 0 | 0 | 0 | 0 | 0 | 0 | 0 | 0 | 0 | 0 |
| Lazio | Total | | 2 | 0 | 1 | 0 | 6 | 0 | 0 | 0 | 9 | 0 |
| Career total | | | 326 | 1 | 15 | 0 | 82 | 0 | 3 | 0 | 426 | 1 |

== Honours ==
La Louvière

- Belgian Cup: 2002–03

Anderlecht

- Belgian First Division (6): 2005–06, 2006–07, 2009–10, 2011–12, 2012–13, 2013–14
- Belgian Cup: 2007–08
- Belgian Supercup (6): 2006, 2007, 2010, 2012, 2013, 2014

Lazio

- Coppa Italia: 2018–19
- Supercoppa Italiana: 2019

Individual

- Belgian Professional Goalkeeper of the Season: 2004–05, 2011–12, 2012-13
- Goal of the Season: 2008
- Belgian Bronze Shoe: 2012, 2013
- Belgian Goalkeeper of the Year: 2013
- DH The Best RSC Anderlecht Team Ever: 2020
