= Luis Alberto (footballer, born 1992) =

Spanish footballer

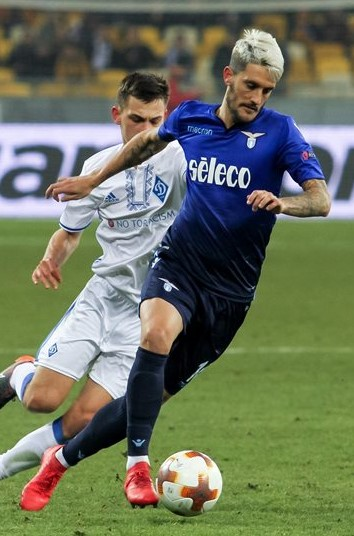
- Luis Alberto with Lazio in 2018

Personal information
- Full name: Luis Alberto Romero Alconchel
- Date of birth: 28 September 1992 (age 34)
- Place of birth: San José del Valle, Spain
- Height: 1.82 m (6 ft 0 in)
- Position: Attacking midfielder

Team information
- Current team: Al-Wakrah
- Number: 32

Youth career
- Xerez
- 2004–2009: Sevilla

Senior career*
Years	Team	Apps	(Gls)
2009–2010	Sevilla C	20	(7)
2009–2012	Sevilla B	77	(25)
2011–2013	Sevilla	7	(0)
2012–2013	→ Barcelona B (loan)	38	(11)
2013–2016	Liverpool	9	(0)
2014–2015	→ Málaga (loan)	15	(2)
2015–2016	→ Deportivo La Coruña (loan)	29	(6)
2016–2024	Lazio	242	(47)
2024–2026	Al Duhail	31	(7)
2026–	Al-Wakrah	5	(0)

International career
2010–2011	Spain U18	2	(0)
2011–2012	Spain U19	3	(1)
2013	Spain U21	1	(0)
2017	Spain	1	(0)
- * Club domestic league appearances and goals as of 04:48, 1 March 2026 (UTC)

Luis Alberto Romero Alconchel (Spanish pronunciation: [lwis alˈβeɾto roˈmeɾo]; (Note: In isolation, Luis and Alberto are pronounced [lwis] and [alˈβeɾto] respectively.) born 28 September 1992), known as Luis Alberto, is a Spanish professional footballer who plays as an attacking midfielder for Qatar Stars League club Al-Wakrah.

After coming through Sevilla's youth system, he signed with Liverpool in 2013 from Barcelona B, being loaned to Málaga and Deportivo during his contract. In August 2016 he joined Lazio for €4 million, going on to spend eight seasons in Serie A with the club while totalling 307 competitive appearances and 52 goals, winning two Supercoppa Italiana and the 2019 Coppa Italia.

Luis Alberto made his senior debut for Spain in 2017.

== Club career ==
=== Sevilla ===
A product of Sevilla FC, Luis Alberto was born in San José del Valle, Province of Cádiz, and he spent his first three seasons as a senior with the reserves in the Segunda División B, scoring 15 goals in the second. On 16 April 2011 he made his first-team – and La Liga – debut for the Andalusians, replacing another club youth graduate, Rodri, in the second half of a 1–0 away loss against Getafe CF.

=== Barcelona B ===
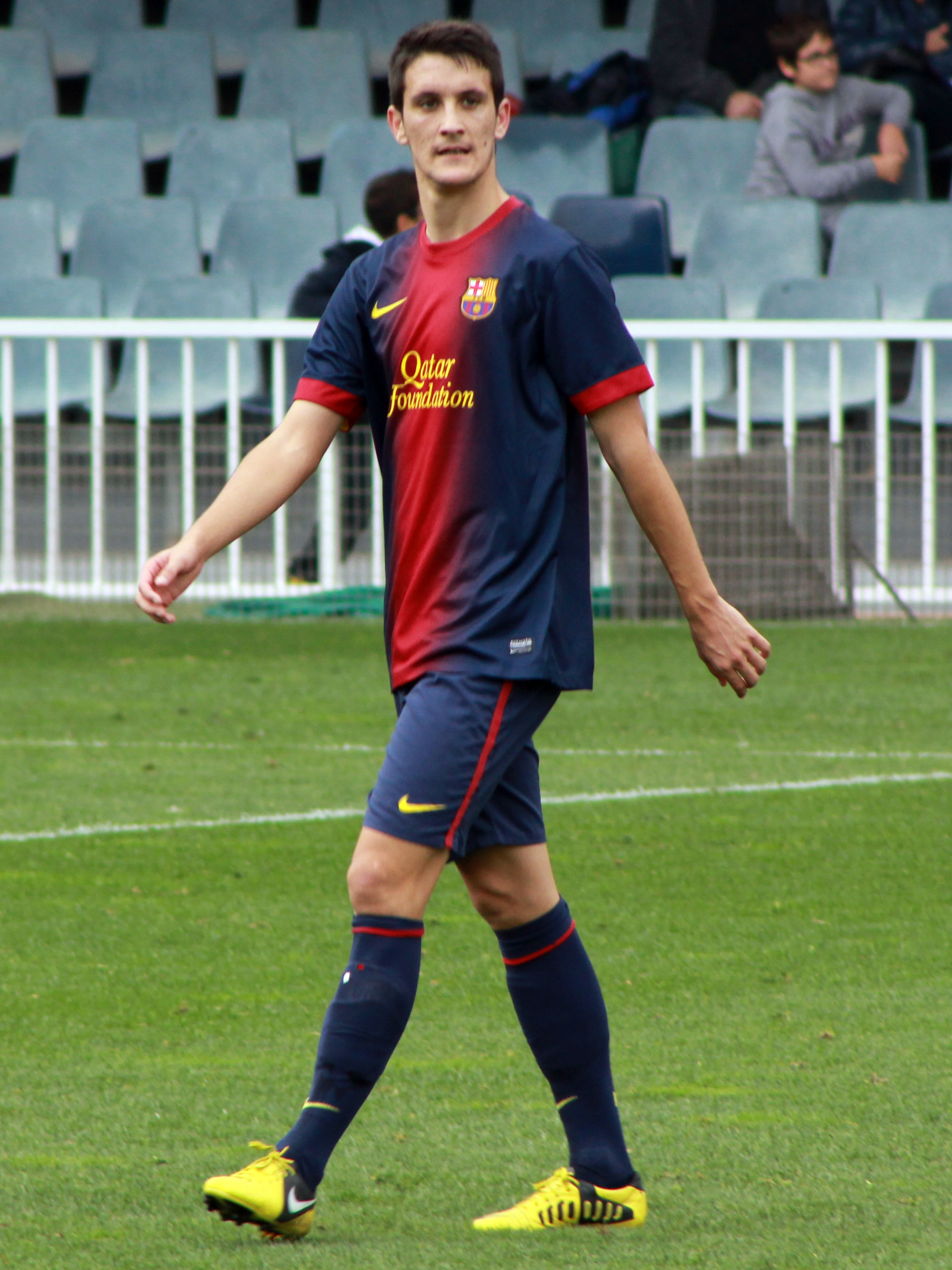
Luis Alberto playing for Barcelona B in 2012

In August 2012, Luis Alberto was loaned to FC Barcelona Atlètic in a one-year deal, with the Catalans having the option to make the move permanent at the end of the season. He made his official debut on 2 September by playing two minutes in a 2–0 home win over CE Sabadell FC, and finished the campaign as second top scorer in the squad, only behind Gerard Deulofeu.

=== Liverpool ===
On 20 June 2013, Sevilla received a £6.8 million offer from Liverpool for Luis Alberto, which was accepted. The signing was completed two days later subject to international clearance, and he made his debut for the English club on 13 July in a 4–0 pre-season friendly win against Preston North End.

Luis Alberto made his Premier League debut on 1 September 2013, playing the last seven minutes in a 1–0 home victory over Manchester United in place of Philippe Coutinho. On 15 December, shortly after having scored a hat-trick in an under-21 match with the Reds, he provided an assist for Luis Suárez in the 5–0 away demolition of Tottenham Hotspur.

On 26 June 2014, Luis Alberto was loaned to Málaga CF in a season-long move. In the league opener, on 23 August, he scored the only goal in a home defeat of Athletic Bilbao.

On 5 July 2015, Luis Alberto agreed a loan move to Deportivo de La Coruña subject to a medical the following day. There, he linked up with manager Víctor Sánchez, who was previously in Sevilla's coaching staff.

=== Lazio ===
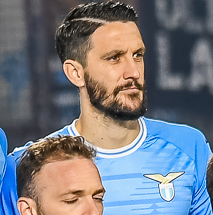
Luis Alberto at Lazio in 2023

On 31 August 2016, Luis Alberto signed for Italian club SS Lazio for a fee of €4 million. He played only nine Serie A matches in his first season, but became an undisputed starter for the Simone Inzaghi-led side from there onwards.

Luis Alberto scored 12 goals in all competitions in the 2017–18 campaign, and added 18 assists. In October 2020, he tested positive for COVID-19.

In April 2024, during an interview for DAZN, Luis Alberto revealed that he wanted to leave Lazio at the end of the season.

=== Qatar ===
On 11 June 2024, it was announced that Luis Alberto would join Al Duhail SC of the Qatar Stars League on a three-year deal from 1 July; the transfer reportedly commanded a €12 million fee, plus add-ons and a 25% sell-on clause in favour of Liverpool. On 20 December, he started as his team won the QSL Cup after defeating Al-Arabi SC 2–1.

Luis Alberto moved to Al-Wakrah SC on 14 January 2026.

== International career ==
Luis Alberto earned his only cap for the Spain under-21 team on 5 February 2013, coming on for Valencia CF's Paco Alcácer midway through the second half of a 1–1 friendly draw in Belgium. He first appeared with the full side on 11 November 2017, playing the last 16 minutes in a 5–0 friendly win against Costa Rica.

== Style of play ==
A talented and versatile playmaker, Luis Alberto usually plays either in a central role as an attacking midfielder or as a left winger, a position which allows him to cut inside and shoot on goal with his stronger right foot. He is also capable of playing in several other attacking positions including second striker, or even in a deeper role as an offensive minded central midfielder, known as the mezzala in Italian football jargon. Although he lacks physicality, he is known for his awareness, technical qualities, ball control and dribbling skills, as well as his passing, crossing and vision, which allow him to create chances and provide assists for teammates.

Moreover, he is an accurate set piece taker who possesses an eye for goal, and has a penchant for shooting from distance. Beyond his offensive qualities, he is also known for his defensive work-rate.

== Personal life ==
Luis Alberto married his longtime girlfriend Patricia Venegas in 2014, fathering daughter Martina (born 2016) and son Lucas (2018).

On 19 January 2021, Luis Alberto underwent a successful emergency surgery in Rome to treat appendicitis.

== Career statistics ==
=== Club ===
As of match played 18 April 2025

Appearances and goals by club, season and competition
Club	Season	League			National cup (Note: Includes Copa del Rey, FA Cup, Coppa Italia)		League cup (Note: Includes Football League Cup, Qatari Stars Cup)		Continental		Other		Total	
Club	Season	Division	Apps	Goals	Apps	Goals	Apps	Goals	Apps	Goals	Apps	Goals	Apps	Goals
Sevilla B	2009–10	Segunda División B	15	3	—		—		—		—		15	3
Sevilla B	2010–11	Segunda División B	31	15	—		—		—		3 (Note: Appearances in Segunda División B play-offs)	1	34	16
Sevilla B	2011–12	Segunda División B	31	7	—		—		—		—		31	7
Sevilla B	Total		77	25	—		—		—		3	1	80	26
Sevilla	2010–11	La Liga	2	0	1	0	—		—		—		3	0
Sevilla	2011–12	La Liga	5	0	1	0	—		—		—		6	0
Sevilla	Total		7	0	2	0	—		—		—		9	0
Barcelona B (loan)	2012–13	Segunda División	38	11	—		—		—		—		38	11
Liverpool	2013–14	Premier League	9	0	2	0	1	0	—		—		12	0
Málaga (loan)	2014–15	La Liga	15	2	5	0	—		—		—		20	2
Deportivo La Coruña (loan)	2015–16	La Liga	29	6	2	0	—		—		—		31	6
Lazio	2016–17	Serie A	9	1	1	0	—		—		—		10	1
Lazio	2017–18	Serie A	34	11	3	0	—		9 (Note: Appearances in UEFA Europa League)	1	1 (Note: Appearance in Supercoppa Italiana)	0	47	12
Lazio	2018–19	Serie A	27	4	5	1	—		5	1	—		37	6
Lazio	2019–20	Serie A	36	6	0	0	—		4	0	1	1	41	7
Lazio	2020–21	Serie A	34	9	0	0	—		6 (Note: Appearances in UEFA Champions League)	0	—		40	9
Lazio	2021–22	Serie A	34	5	2	0	—		8	0	—		44	5
Lazio	2022–23	Serie A	35	6	2	0	—		7 (Note: Four appearances and one goal in UEFA Europa League, three appearances in UEFA Europa Conference League)	1	—		44	7
Lazio	2023–24	Serie A	33	5	2	0	—		8	0	1	0	44	5
Lazio	Total		242	47	15	1	—		47	3	3	1	307	52
Al Duhail	2024–25	Qatar Stars League	21	2	—		7	2	—		—		28	4
Career total			438	93	26	1	8	2	47	3	6	2	525	101

=== International ===
Appearances and goals by national team and year
National team	Year	Apps	Goals
Spain	2017	1	0
Total		1	0

== Honours ==
Lazio

- Coppa Italia: 2018–19
- Supercoppa Italiana: 2017, 2019

Al Duhail

- QSL Cup: 2024–25

Individual

- Serie A Team of the Year: 2019–20
- Serie A Player of the Month: February 2020
