= Luca Falbo =

Italian professional footballer

Personal information
- Date of birth: 21 February 2000 (age 26)
- Place of birth: Chivasso, Italy
- Height: 1.84 m (6 ft 0 in)
- Position: Left-back

Team information
- Current team: Ravenna
- Number: 3

Youth career
- –2017: Roma
- 2017–2019: Lazio

Senior career*
Years	Team	Apps	(Gls)
2019–2022	Lazio	1	(0)
2020–2021	→ Viterbese (loan)	19	(0)
2022–2023	Monopoli	24	(3)
2023–2024	Avellino	8	(0)
2024	→ Brindisi (loan)	12	(1)
2024–2025	Rimini	26	(2)
2025–	Ravenna	19	(0)
- * Club domestic league appearances and goals as of 30 April 2026

Luca Falbo (born 21 February 2000) is an Italian professional footballer who plays as a left-back for Serie C Group B club Ravenna.

== Professional career ==
On 1 July 2017, Falbo joined the youth academy of Lazio from Roma. Falbo made his professional debut with Lazio in a 2–0 UEFA Europa League loss to Rennes on 12 December 2019. He made his Serie A debut for Lazio on 20 July 2020 as an 89th-minute substitute for Luiz Felipe in a 1–2 away loss to Juventus.

On 2 October 2020 he joined Serie C club Viterbese on loan.

On 25 July 2022, Falbo moved to Monopoli on a one-season deal.

On 14 July 2023, Falbo signed a contract with Avellino for one year with an option to renew. On 10 January 2024, Falbo moved on loan to Brindisi.
