= Valon Berisha =

Kosovan footballer (born 1993)

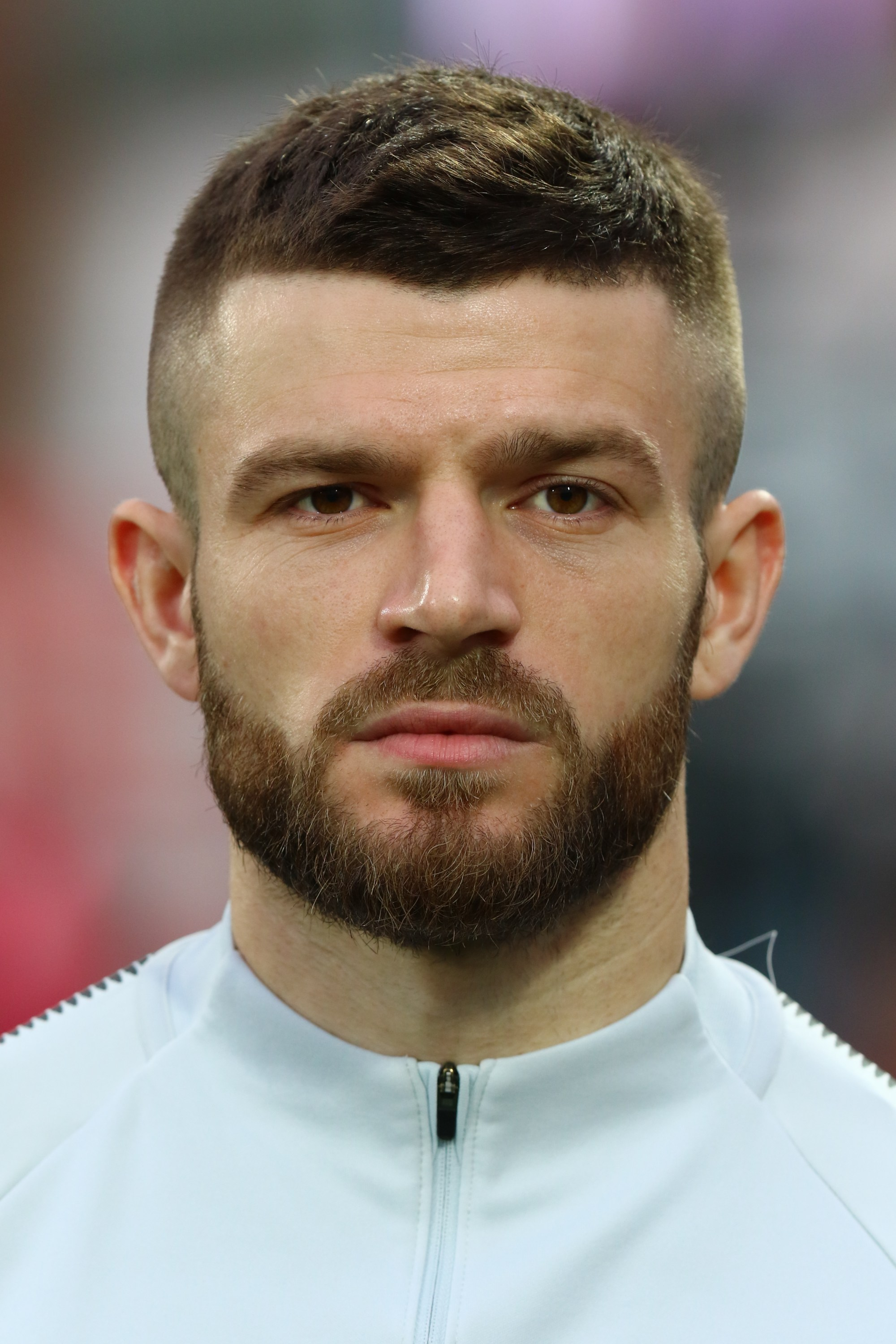
- Berisha in 2018

Personal information
- Date of birth: 7 February 1993 (age 33)
- Place of birth: Malmö, Sweden
- Height: 1.76 m (5 ft 9 in)
- Position: Midfielder

Team information
- Current team: Zürich
- Number: 23

Youth career
- 1998–2009: Egersund

Senior career*
Years	Team	Apps	(Gls)
2009	Egersund	31	(11)
2009–2012	Viking	56	(4)
2012–2018	Red Bull Salzburg	167	(31)
2018–2020	Lazio	11	(0)
2020	→ Fortuna Düsseldorf (loan)	13	(0)
2020–2023	Reims	37	(0)
2022	Reims B	3	(0)
2022–2023	→ Melbourne City (loan)	27	(1)
2024–2026	LASK	46	(3)
2026–	Zürich	17	(1)

International career
2010	Norway U15	4	(0)
2009	Norway U16	10	(2)
2010	Norway U17	8	(0)
2010	Norway U18	7	(0)
2011	Norway U19	8	(0)
2011–2014	Norway U21	18	(3)
2013	Norway U23	1	(1)
2012–2016	Norway	20	(0)
2016–2025	Kosovo	52	(4)
Medal record
Representing Norway
European Under-21 Championship
Bronze medal – third place	2013 Israel	U-21
- * Club domestic league appearances and goals as of 28 September 2026

Valon Berisha (born 7 February 1993) is a professional footballer who plays as a midfielder for Swiss Super League club Zürich and the Kosovo national team. Born in Sweden and raised in Norway, he previously represented Norway at youth and full international level.

== Club career ==
=== Early years ===
Berisha was born in Malmö, Sweden, to Albanian immigrants from Podujevë, Kosovo. But grew up in Norway, living in Egersund, a town south of Stavanger. He spent his early years at local club Egersunds IK.

Berisha spent three trial periods with Premier League side Chelsea between the ages of 14 and 15, whilst also spending time with Manchester City and Aston Villa. The latter two clubs offered him a contract, both of which he turned down in favour of staying in Norway. On 20 June 2008, at the age of just 15 years, Berisha made his senior debut for EIK against Staal Jørpeland IL in the Norwegian Third Division.

=== Viking ===
Berisha signed for Viking FK in March 2009. He made his Tippeligaen debut against Brann on 21 March 2010, coming on for Vidar Nisja in the 85th minute. He started twelve league appearances that season, four in the starting line-up and all on the left wing. It was from the left that he scored his first professional goal on 31 October in a 1–1 draw against Lillestrøm. The goal, which showcased a 20-yard in-field dribble and shot 25 yards from goal, was nominated for Tippeligaen 2010 Goal of the Season. Berisha kept his place in the side for the season ender against Kongsvinger, where his man of the match performance inspired Viking to a 3–1 come back.

Before Tippeligaen 2011, Viking manager Åge Hareide talked up Berisha as one of the best players he had coached, and in May, he won the Statoil Talent Prize, an award handed to outstanding young Norwegian footballers each month. Each winner is given the opportunity to donate a scholarship of 50,000 Norwegian kroner to the club he or she thought had the most importance to their development; Berisha chose to give the money to his first club, Egersunds IK.

As with 2010, one of his season's highlights was a goal scored from an almost replicate 25-yard shot against Lillestrøm on 3 July 2011. Throughout that year, Berisha duly became a guaranteed starter for Viking, playing 88% of possible playing time. Despite continuing to play on the left wing for most of that time, Berisha became more prominent in his favoured central attacking midfield position as the season went on, something Stig Torbjørnsen, one of Norway's most famous talent scouts, wished for prior to the season start. On 19 June 2011, Valon and his brother Veton became the first brothers to play together for Viking in 22 years since Jan and Egil Fjetland played against Molde in the 1989 Norwegian Cup final. Despite both moving to Viking from Egersund, it was the first time the Berisha brothers had played a senior game together.

On 15 February 2012, the day after Berisha was called up by Egil Olsen to play Northern Ireland, his agent Jim Solbakken told Stavanger Aftenblad: "We are already in talks with several clubs that have Valon Berisha high or at the very top of their list when the international transfer market opens this summer ... Now we just need to find the club that fits Berisha and who will pay a lot for him." To this, Berisha said, "I must be much better before I am ready for the league I aim to. I see [my next club] as an intermediate step, such as in the Netherlands [in Eredivisie] which focuses on young players."

=== Red Bull Salzburg ===
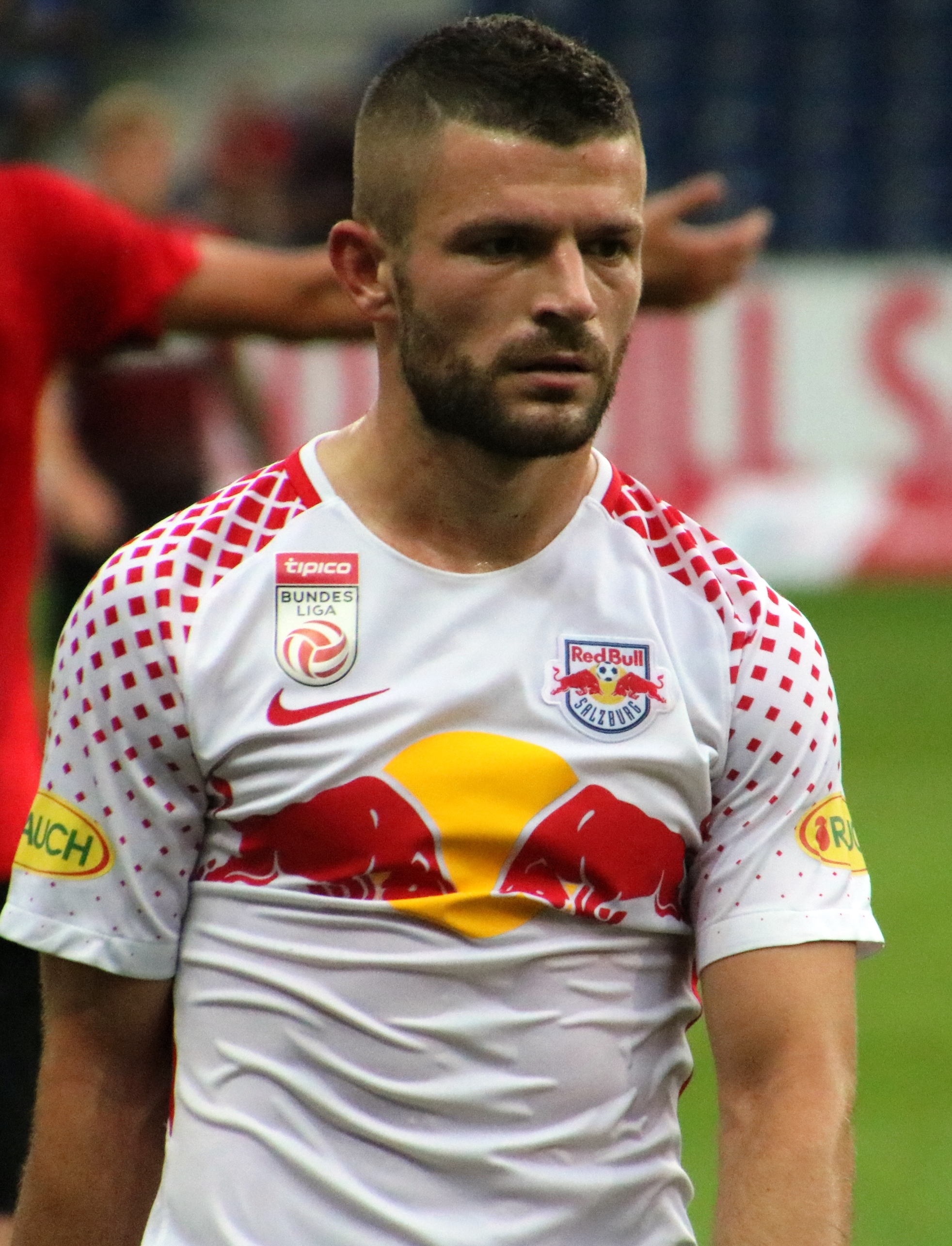
Berisha in action with Red Bull Salzburg in 2017

In July 2012, Berisha signed a deal with Red Bull Salzburg, joining the club at the same time as fellow Norwegian Håvard Nielsen After a brief illness, he made his debut against Admira on 18 August 2012. He twice assisted his compatriot Nielsen, and was involved in what was his hat trick goal in a 4–4 draw. He scored his first goal for Red Bull the next week in the 1–1 draw against Wiener Neustadt, and scored another in the 4–0 victory against Wacker Innsbruck on 1 September. Of his 27 Goals for Red Bull Salzburg in the Austrian Bundesliga 14 of those strikes have come from outside of the box.

During the 2017–18 season Salzburg had their best ever European campaign. They finished top of their Europa League group, for a record fourth time, before beating Real Sociedad and Borussia Dortmund thus making their first ever appearance in the UEFA Europa League semi-final. On 3 May 2018, he played in the Europa League semi-finals as Olympique de Marseille played out a 1–2 away loss but a 3–2 aggregate win to secure a place in the 2018 UEFA Europa League Final

=== Lazio ===
On 3 July 2018, Berisha joined Serie A side Lazio, on a five-year contract. Lazio reportedly paid a €7.5 million transfer fee. On 4 October 2018, he made his debut with Lazio in the group stage of 2018–19 UEFA Europa League against the German side Eintracht Frankfurt after coming on as a substitute at 64th minute in place of Sergej Milinković-Savić. Three days later, he made his first Serie A appearance by entering in the 85th minute of the 1–0 home win over Fiorentina in place of Ciro Immobile.

==== Loan at Fortuna Düsseldorf ====
On 30 January 2020, Berisha joined Bundesliga side Fortuna Düsseldorf, on a six-month-long loan. Two days later, he made his debut in a 1–1 home draw against Eintracht Frankfurt after being named in the starting line-up.

=== Reims ===
On 9 July 2020, Berisha signed a four-year contract with Ligue 1 club Reims and receiving squad number 14. Reims reportedly paid a €5 million transfer fee. On 23 August 2020, he made his debut in a 2–2 away draw against Monaco after coming on as a substitute at 56th minute in place of Dereck Kutesa.

==== Loan at Melbourne City ====
On 7 September 2022, Berisha was sent on a one-year loan to Australian club Melbourne City in the A-League. He received the number 14 ahead of the season. A month later, Berisha made his league debut in a 2–1 home win over defending champions Western United. On 11 February 2023, he scored his first goal for the club, from a penalty kick, in a 4–2 win against Perth Glory at Macedonia Park. Berisha started in the 2023 A-League Grand Final, but was replaced by Richard van der Venne in the 22nd minute due to a collision with Danny Vukovic. City lost 6–1 to Central Coast Mariners. On 9 June, after contributing 7 assists and 1 goal during his loan spell, Berisha returned to Reims.

On 1 September 2023, Reims had announced that Berisha's contract had been terminated by mutual agreement.

=== LASK ===
On 8 January 2024, Berisha returned to the Austrian Bundesliga, signing a two-and-a-half-year contract with LASK.

== International career ==
=== Norway ===
Berisha has amounted over forty appearances for all of Norway's age-specific national sides. He has played in all four of Norway under-21s' four games during the 2013 European Under-21 Championship qualification campaign. He scored Norway's only goal in the 2–1 loss against England under-21 side.

On 23 November 2011, Berisha was called up to mostly domestic-based Norway squad for the 2012 King's Cup in Thailand. He was one of fourteen players who made their international debut at the friendly tournament which ran from 15 January until 21 January. Berisha made his debut for the national team when he replaced Alexander Søderlund as a 62nd-minute substitute in a 1–1 friendly draw against Denmark League XI on 15 January 2012. He started the remaining two games of the tournament against Thailand and South Korea U23. When asked whether he agreed with the plaudits he had gained from the press and coaches at the tournament, Berisha said, "I am very happy ... I've tried to show that I can work hard both ways, that I can take initiative with or without the ball, in challenge and with speed – I feel I've managed well."

On 14 February 2012, Berisha was called up to play Northern Ireland on 29 February 2012. He was one of seven players to keep their place in the national side following the King's Cup, and the only player to be called up for the first time to a squad that also contains expatriate players.

=== Kosovo ===
At a meeting in December 2012, FIFA voted to allow Kosovo to take part in friendly matches against its members. Ahead of the team's first match, in March 2014, Stavanger Aftenblad reported that Berisha had been approached by Kosovo, but he had not made a decision as to whether he would switch allegiance. In 2016, after Kosovo became a FIFA member, he elected to play for them and was granted clearance. He scored on his debut for Kosovo on 5 September as his 60th-minute penalty earned a 1–1 draw against Finland in a 2018 FIFA World Cup qualification match.

== Personal life ==
Berisha's younger brother, Veton, is also a professional footballer and Norway international.

== Career statistics ==
=== Club ===
As of match played 1 November 2025

Appearances and goals by club, season and competition
Club	Season	League			National Cup		Continental		Total	
Club	Season	Division	Apps	Goals	Apps	Goals	Apps	Goals	Apps	Goals
Viking	2010	Tippeligaen	12	1	1	0	—		13	1
Viking	2011	Tippeligaen	28	3	3	0	—		31	3
Viking	2012	Tippeligaen	16	0	2	0	—		18	0
Viking	Total		56	4	6	0	—		62	4
Red Bull Salzburg	2012–13	Austrian Bundesliga	30	6	3	0	—		33	6
Red Bull Salzburg	2013–14	Austrian Bundesliga	32	5	3	3	12	0	47	8
Red Bull Salzburg	2014–15	Austrian Bundesliga	14	4	3	0	2	0	19	4
Red Bull Salzburg	2015–16	Austrian Bundesliga	33	5	6	1	4	0	43	6
Red Bull Salzburg	2016–17	Austrian Bundesliga	34	7	3	0	9	1	46	8
Red Bull Salzburg	2017–18	Austrian Bundesliga	24	4	3	2	18	7	45	13
Red Bull Salzburg	Total		167	31	21	6	45	8	233	45
Lazio	2018–19	Serie A	8	0	1	0	5	0	14	0
Lazio	2019–20	Serie A	3	0	1	0	4	0	8	0
Lazio	Total		11	0	2	0	9	0	22	0
Fortuna Düsseldorf (loan)	2019–20	Bundesliga	13	0	0	0	—		13	0
Reims	2020–21	Ligue 1	24	0	1	0	2	1	27	1
Reims	2021–22	Ligue 1	13	0	1	0	—		14	0
Reims	Total		37	0	2	0	2	1	41	1
Reims II	2021–22	CFA 2	2	0	—		—		2	0
Reims II	2022–23	CFA 2	1	0	—		—		1	0
Reims II	Total		3	0	—		—		3	0
Melbourne City (loan)	2022–23	A-League Men	27	1	0	0	0	0	27	1
LASK	2023–24	Austrian Bundesliga	15	0	1	0	0	0	16	0
LASK	2024–25	Austrian Bundesliga	21	3	3	1	7	2	31	6
LASK	2025–26	Austrian Bundesliga	10	0	2	0	0	0	12	0
LASK	Total		46	3	6	1	7	2	59	6
Career total			360	39	37	7	63	11	460	57

=== International ===
Appearances and goals by national team and year
National team	Year	Apps	Goals
Norway	2012	8	0
Norway	2013	3	0
Norway	2014	2	0
Norway	2015	3	0
Norway	2016	4	0
Norway	Total	20	0
Kosovo	2016	4	1
Kosovo	2017	6	0
Kosovo	2018	4	0
Kosovo	2019	6	2
Kosovo	2020	6	0
Kosovo	2021	5	0
Kosovo	2022	5	1
Kosovo	2023	4	0
Kosovo	2024	8	0
Kosovo	2025	4	0
Kosovo	Total	52	4
Career total		72	4

Scores and results list Kosovo's goal tally first, score column indicates score after each Berisha goal.

List of international goals scored by Valon Berisha
No.	Date	Venue	Opponent	Score	Result	Competition	Ref.
1.	5 September 2016	Veritas Stadion, Turku, Finland	Finland	1–1	1–1	2018 FIFA World Cup qualification	
2.	10 September 2019	St Mary's Stadium, Southampton, England	England	1–0	3–5	UEFA Euro 2020 qualifying	
3.	10 September 2019	St Mary's Stadium, Southampton, England	England	2–5	3–5	UEFA Euro 2020 qualifying	
4.	2 June 2022	AEK Arena – Georgios Karapatakis, Larnaca, Cyprus	Cyprus	1–0	2–0	2022–23 UEFA Nations League C	

== Honours ==
Red Bull Salzburg

- Austrian Bundesliga: 2013–14, 2014–15, 2015–16, 2016–17, 2017–18
- Austrian Cup: 2013–14, 2014–15, 2015–16, 2016–17

Lazio

- Coppa Italia: 2018–19
- Supercoppa Italiana: 2019

Melbourne City

- A-League Men Premiership: 2022–23

Norway U21

- UEFA European Under-21 Championship bronze: 2013

Individual

- Austrian Bundesliga Player of the Year: 2017–18
- Austrian Bundesliga top assist provider: 2016–17
- Austrian Bundesliga Team of the Year: 2016–17, 2017–18
