= Jony Rodríguez =

Spanish footballer (born 1991)

Jony
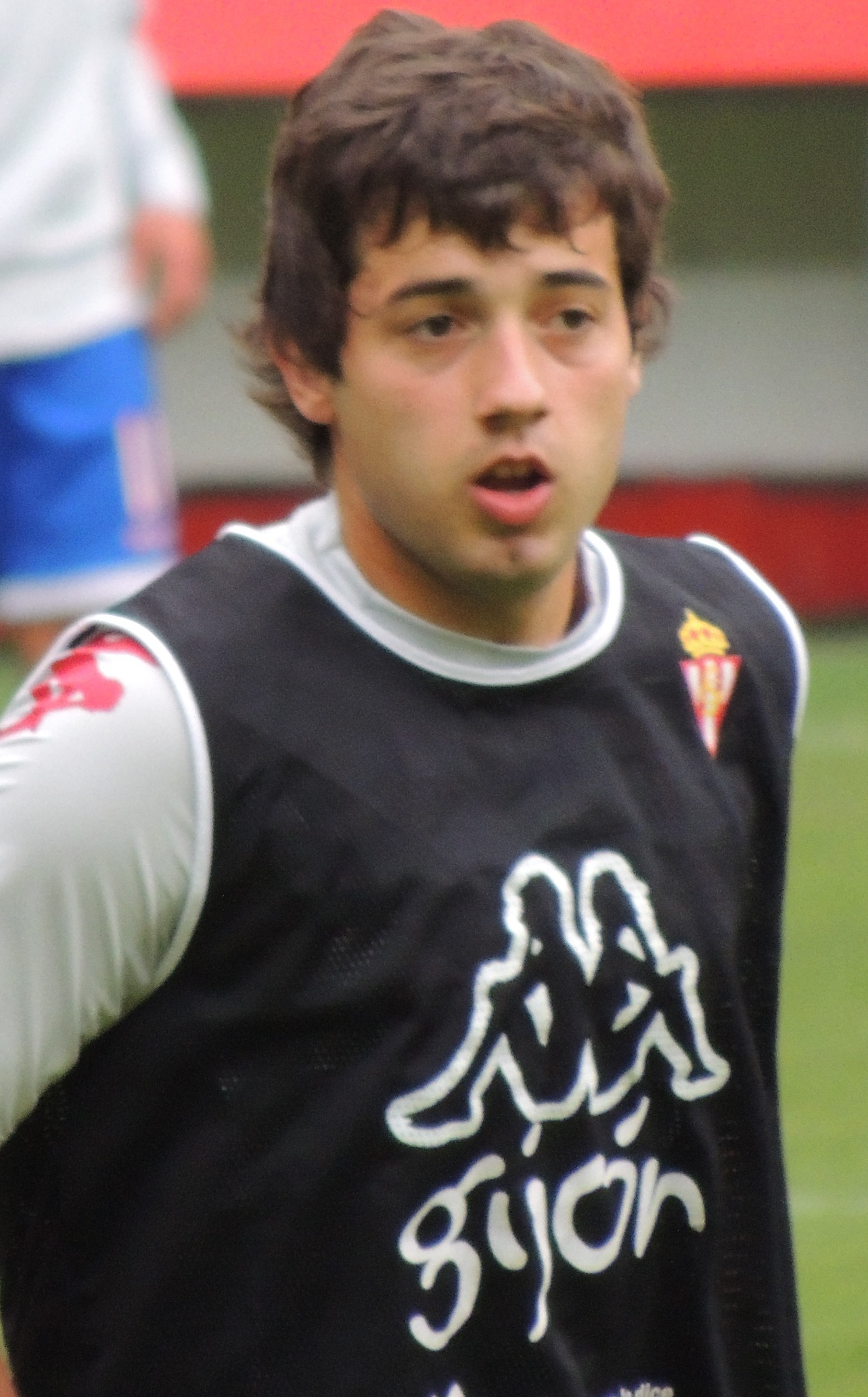
- Jony warming up for Sporting Gijón in 2014

Personal information
- Full name: Jonathan Rodríguez Menéndez
- Date of birth: 9 July 1991 (age 35)
- Place of birth: Cangas del Narcea, Spain
- Height: 1.79 m (5 ft 10 in)
- Position: Winger

Youth career
- 1997–2006: Narcea
- 2006–2008: Oviedo
- 2008–2010: Barcelona

Senior career*
Years	Team	Apps	(Gls)
2010–2011	Oviedo B	24	(4)
2010–2011	Oviedo	1	(0)
2011–2012	Marino	32	(5)
2012–2013	Getafe B	8	(1)
2013	Avilés	16	(0)
2013–2014	Sporting Gijón B	31	(8)
2014–2016	Sporting Gijón	82	(14)
2016–2019	Málaga	29	(2)
2018	→ Sporting Gijón (loan)	21	(5)
2018–2019	→ Alavés (loan)	36	(5)
2019–2023	Lazio	24	(0)
2020–2021	→ Osasuna (loan)	22	(0)
2022–2023	→ Sporting Gijón (loan)	17	(1)
2023–2024	Cartagena	2	(0)
- * Club domestic league appearances and goals as of 14 December 2023

Jonathan Rodríguez Menéndez (born 9 July 1991), commonly known as Jony, is a Spanish professional footballer who plays as a left winger.

== Club career ==
=== Early years ===
Born in Cangas del Narcea, Asturias, Jony finished his youth career with FC Barcelona after a period with local Real Oviedo. He made his senior debut with the latter's reserves in the 2010–11 season, in the Tercera División.

In June 2011, Jony moved to Segunda División B club Marino de Luanco. He continued competing at that level the following years, representing Getafe CF B, Real Avilés Industrial CF and Sporting Atlético.

=== Sporting Gijón ===
Jony signed a new two-year deal with the latter's first team on 7 May 2014. He played his first match as a professional three days later, starting and scoring the first goal in a 2–1 home win over Hércules CF in the Segunda División.

In the 2014–15 campaign, Jony contributed seven goals in 41 appearances as the Rojiblancos returned to La Liga after a three-year absence. He made his debut in the competition on 23 August 2015, starting the 0–0 home draw against Real Madrid.

Jony scored his first goal in the Spanish top flight on 23 September, but in a 2–1 loss at Rayo Vallecano.

=== Málaga ===
On 23 June 2016, Jony signed a four-year contract with fellow top-division club Málaga CF after his contract with Sporting expired. On 12 January 2018, he returned to Sporting on loan until the end of the second-tier season. In April, he was named Player of the Month for the previous month.

On 17 June 2018, following Málaga's top-flight relegation, Jony was loaned to Deportivo Alavés of the same division for one year.

=== Lazio ===
Jony joined SS Lazio on 23 July 2019. His maiden Serie A appearance took place on 1 September, when he came on as a 78th-minute substitute in the 1–1 home draw with AS Roma.

On 20 September 2020, Jony moved to CA Osasuna on loan until 30 June 2021 with an option to buy. On 30 January 2022, he returned to Sporting on another loan; the move was extended at the latter in July for another year.

=== Cartagena ===
On 1 September 2023, Jony signed a one-year contract with FC Cartagena after terminating his link with Lazio. The following January, having totalled just 66 competitive minutes, he was released.

== Career statistics ==
As of match played 17 January 2021

Appearances and goals by club, season and competition
Club	Season	League			National Cup		Continental		Other		Total	
Club	Season	Division	Apps	Goals	Apps	Goals	Apps	Goals	Apps	Goals	Apps	Goals
Oviedo	2010–11	Segunda División B	1	0	0	0	—		—		1	0
Marino	2011–12	Segunda División B	32	5	2	0	—		—		34	5
Getafe B	2012–13	Segunda División B	8	1	—		—		—		8	1
Avilés	2012–13	Segunda División B	16	0	0	0	—		—		16	0
Sporting Gijón B	2013–14	Segunda División B	31	8	—		—		—		31	8
Sporting Gijón	2013–14	Segunda División	5	2	0	0	—		2 (Note: Appearances in La Liga play-offs)	0	7	2
Sporting Gijón	2014–15	Segunda División	41	7	1	1	—		—		42	8
Sporting Gijón	2015–16	La Liga	36	5	0	0	—		—		36	5
Sporting Gijón	Total		82	14	1	1	0	0	2	0	85	15
Málaga	2016–17	La Liga	24	2	2	0	—		—		26	2
Málaga	2017–18	La Liga	5	0	2	0	—		—		7	0
Málaga	Total		29	2	4	0	0	0	0	0	33	2
Sporting Gijón (loan)	2017–18	Segunda División	21	5	0	0	—		2	1	23	6
Alavés (loan)	2018–19	La Liga	36	5	1	0	—		—		37	5
Lazio	2019–20	Serie A	24	0	2	0	6 (Note: Appearances in UEFA Europa League)	0	—		32	0
Osasuna (loan)	2020–21	La Liga	22	0	2	0	—		—		24	0
Career total			303	39	12	1	6	0	4	1	324	42

== Honours ==
Lazio

- Supercoppa Italiana: 2019

Individual

- Segunda División Player of the Month: March 2018
