= 2019 Supercoppa Italiana =

- Event: Supercoppa Italiana
Juventus	Lazio
Serie A	Coppa Italia
1	3
- Date: 22 December 2019
- Venue: King Saud University Stadium, Riyadh, Saudi Arabia
- Referee: Gianpaolo Calvarese
- Attendance: 23,361

The 2019 Supercoppa Italiana (branded as the Coca-Cola Supercup for sponsorship reasons) was the 32nd edition of the Supercoppa Italiana. It was played on 22 December 2019 by defending champions Juventus, the winners of the 2018–19 Serie A championship, and Lazio, the winners of the 2018–19 Coppa Italia. The match was held at the King Saud University Stadium in Riyadh, Saudi Arabia. Lazio won the match 3–1 and claimed their fifth Supercoppa title.

== Background ==
The match was the fifth meeting between the two teams in the Supercoppa Italiana, and is now the most frequent pairing in the history of the competition, surpassing Inter Milan and Roma who have met four times. In the previous four match-ups, each club had won twice, with Juventus lifting the trophy in 2013 and 2015, and Lazio in 1998 and 2017.

== Venue ==
Location of the host city of the 2019 Supercoppa Italiana.	City	Stadium
Location of the host city of the 2019 Supercoppa Italiana.	Riyadh	King Saud University Stadium
Location of the host city of the 2019 Supercoppa Italiana.	Capacity: 25,000	

== Match ==
=== Details ===
22 December 2019
19:45 AST

Juventus	1–3	Lazio
Dybala 45'	Report	Luis Alberto 16'; Lulić 73'; Cataldi 90+4'

King Saud University Stadium, Riyadh (Saudi Arabia)
Attendance: 23,361
Referee: Gianpaolo Calvarese

Juventus	Lazio

GK	1	(Poland) Wojciech Szczęsny
RB	2	(Italy) Mattia De Sciglio		(substituted off) 55'
CB	19	(Italy) Leonardo Bonucci (c)
CB	28	(Turkey) Merih Demiral
LB	12	(Brazil) Alex Sandro
CM	30	(Uruguay) Rodrigo Bentancur	(yellow card) 48' (yellow-red card) 90+3'
CM	5	(Bosnia and Herzegovina) Miralem Pjanić
CM	14	(France) Blaise Matuidi	(yellow card) 9'	(substituted off) 76'
AM	10	(Argentina) Paulo Dybala
CF	21	(Argentina) Gonzalo Higuaín		(substituted off) 66'
CF	7	(Portugal) Cristiano Ronaldo
Substitutes:
GK	31	(Italy) Carlo Pinsoglio
GK	77	(Italy) Gianluigi Buffon
DF	4	(Netherlands) Matthijs de Ligt
DF	13	(Brazil) Danilo
DF	24	(Italy) Daniele Rugani
MF	8	(Wales) Aaron Ramsey		(substituted on) 66'
MF	23	(Germany) Emre Can
MF	25	(France) Adrien Rabiot
FW	11	(Brazil) Douglas Costa		(substituted on) 76'
FW	16	(Colombia) Juan Cuadrado		(substituted on) 55'
FW	20	(Croatia) Marko Pjaca
FW	33	(Italy) Federico Bernardeschi
Manager:
(Italy) Maurizio Sarri			(yellow card) 90'

GK	1	(Albania) Thomas Strakosha
CB	3	(Brazil) Luiz Felipe
CB	33	(Italy) Francesco Acerbi
CB	26	(Romania) Ștefan Radu
DM	6	(Brazil) Lucas Leiva	(yellow card) 35'	(substituted off) 64'
CM	21	(Serbia) Sergej Milinković-Savić
CM	10	(Spain) Luis Alberto	(yellow card) 58'	(substituted off) 67'
RW	29	(Italy) Manuel Lazzari
LW	19	(Bosnia and Herzegovina) Senad Lulić (c)
CF	17	(Italy) Ciro Immobile		(substituted off) 82'
CF	11	(Argentina) Joaquín Correa
Substitutes:
GK	23	(Italy) Guido Guerrieri
GK	24	(Belgium) Silvio Proto
DF	4	(Spain) Patric
DF	15	(Angola) Bastos
DF	77	(Montenegro) Adam Marušić
MF	7	(Kosovo) Valon Berisha
MF	16	(Italy) Marco Parolo		(substituted on) 67'
MF	22	(Spain) Jony
MF	28	(Italy) André Anderson
MF	32	(Italy) Danilo Cataldi	(yellow card) 90+2'	(substituted on) 64'
FW	20	(Ecuador) Felipe Caicedo		(substituted on) 82'
FW	34	(Netherlands) Bobby Adekanye
Manager:
(Italy) Simone Inzaghi

Assistant referees:
Alessandro Costanzo
Giorgio Peretti
Fourth official:
Fabio Maresca
Reserve assistant referee:
Stefano Alassio
Video assistant referee:
Paolo Mazzoleni
Assistant video assistant referees:
Piero Giacomelli

Match rules

- 90 minutes.
- 30 minutes of extra time if necessary.
- Penalty shoot-out if scores still level.
- Twelve named substitutes, of which up to three may be used.

== See also ==
- 2019–20 Serie A
- 2019–20 Coppa Italia
- 2019–20 Juventus FC season
- 2019–20 SS Lazio season
