= Luiz Felipe (footballer, born March 1997) =

Italian footballer (born 1997)

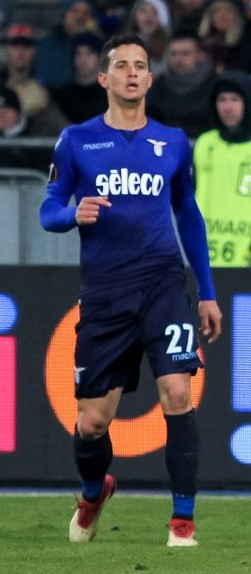
- Luiz Felipe playing for Lazio in 2018

Personal information
- Full name: Luiz Felipe Ramos Marchi
- Date of birth: 22 March 1997 (age 29)
- Place of birth: Colina, São Paulo, Brazil
- Height: 1.87 m (6 ft 2 in)
- Position: Centre-back

Team information
- Current team: Rayo Vallecano
- Number: 5

Senior career*
Years	Team	Apps	(Gls)
2015–2016	Ituano	17	(0)
2016–2022	Lazio	106	(2)
2016–2017	→ Salernitana (loan)	7	(1)
2022–2023	Betis	27	(0)
2023–2025	Al-Ittihad	19	(0)
2025	Marseille	4	(0)
2025–	Rayo Vallecano	10	(0)

International career^{‡}
2017	Brazil U20	2	(0)
2019	Brazil U23	2	(0)
2022	Italy	1	(0)
- * Club domestic league appearances and goals as of 17:42, 8 May 2026 (UTC) ‡ National team caps and goals as of 14 June 2022

Luiz Felipe Ramos Marchi (born 22 March 1997) is a professional footballer who plays as a centre-back for La Liga club Rayo Vallecano. Born in Brazil, he played for the Italy national team.

== Club career ==
=== Early years ===
Luiz Felipe began his football journey in the youth ranks of Colina Atlético, a team from his hometown, Colina, in the interior of the state of São Paulo. At the age of 13, during a trial, he played for 15 minutes in a friendly match against older players from the Ituano U20 team. Juninho Paulista, who was then the coordinator of the Ituano youth academy, was impressed by Luiz's performance and integrated him into Ituano's youth setup.

=== Ituano ===
After impressing in the youth ranks and being regarded as a prospect for the first team, Luiz Felipe made his senior debut for Ituano in a 0–0 draw against Primavera in Indaiatuba, during the sixth round of the 2015 Copa Paulista.

=== Lazio ===
On 26 August 2016, Luiz Felipe traveled to Rome to undergo medical tests and sign a five-year contract with Lazio. Lazio paid a fee of €500,000 for the transfer.

==== Loan to Salernitana ====
After being signed by Lazio, Luiz Felipe was loaned to Salernitana, a club in Italy's second division, Serie B, to gain experience. He made his debut for Salernitana on 10 September 2016 in a 2–1 win over Benevento, scoring the winning goal.

==== Return to Lazio ====
Following a strong stint with Salernitana, Luiz Felipe was recalled by Lazio coach Simone Inzaghi and gradually became a key player for the team. He scored his first goal for Lazio on 26 December 2018 in a 2–0 victory against Bologna in the 18th round of the 2018-19 Serie A. His second goal came in a 3–1 win against Juventus on 7 December 2019, ending Lazio's 16-year winless streak against Juventus at the Stadio Olimpico in Rome. On 15 January 2021, Luiz Felipe reached the milestone of 100 appearances for Lazio during the 18th round of the 2020–21 Serie A against AS Roma, a match that Lazio won 3–0. In March 2022, he announced he would not renew his contract with Lazio, seeking a new challenge in his career. In total, he played 144 matches and scored three goals during his five seasons at Lazio.

=== Betis ===
On 5 July 2022, Luiz Felipe signed a five-year contract with Real Betis, joining the La Liga side on a free transfer after leaving Lazio.

=== Al-Ittihad ===
On 7 September 2023, Luiz Felipe moved to Saudi Arabia to sign for Pro League club Al-Ittihad. Al-Ittihad paid Betis a reported €22,000,000 to sign him, and he penned a four-year deal.

=== Marseille ===
On 7 January 2025, Luiz Felipe signed for French club Marseille on a free transfer following a mutual agreement between him and Al-Ittihad to terminate his contract.

=== Rayo Vallecano ===
On 7 July 2025, Luiz Felipe returned to Spain after joining Rayo Vallecano.

== International career ==
On 16 March 2019, Luiz Felipe was called up by the head coach of the Italy national under-21 team, Luigi Di Biagio. Felipe would reject the call as a sign of his loyalty to his native Brazil; Luis Felipe would debut with Brazil national under-23 team in 2019.

On 24 January 2022, Luiz Felipe accepted a call-up by Italy national team manager Roberto Mancini to join the Azzurri for a three-day training camp in Coverciano.

On 18 March 2022, Luiz Felipe was selected by Roberto Mancini to join the Italy national team for a World Cup Qualifier match against North Macedonia national team on 24 March 2022, making this his first call up to the Italian senior level for a match.

== Personal life ==
Luiz Felipe was born and raised in Colina, São Paulo, his given name being a homage to Brazilian football manager Luiz Felipe Scolari.

He possesses Italian citizenship through jus sanguinis, through an Italian great-grandfather of his, originally from Vicenza but who subsequently settled in Brazil.

== Career statistics ==
=== Club ===
As of match played 16 April 2026

Appearances and goals by club, season and competition
Club	Season	League			State league (Note: Includes Campeonato Paulista)		National cup (Note: Includes Copa do Brasil, Coppa Italia, Copa del Rey, King's Cup)		Continental		Other		Total	
Club	Season	Division	Apps	Goals	Apps	Goals	Apps	Goals	Apps	Goals	Apps	Goals	Apps	Goals
Ituano	2015		—		—		0	0	—		3 (Note: Appearances in Copa Paulista)	0	3	0
Ituano	2016	Série D	9	0	8	0	—		—		1	0	18	0
Ituano	Total		9	0	8	0	0	0	—		4	0	21	0
Salernitana (loan)	2016–17	Serie B	7	1	—		—		—		—		7	1
Lazio	2017–18	Serie A	18	0	—		3	0	10 (Note: Appearances in UEFA Europa League)	0	0	0	31	0
Lazio	2018–19	Serie A	17	1	—		3	0	5	0	—		25	1
Lazio	2019–20	Serie A	26	1	—		1	0	2	0	1 (Note: Appearance in Supercoppa Italiana)	0	30	1
Lazio	2020–21	Serie A	14	0	—		0	0	4 (Note: Appearances in UEFA Champions League)	0	—		18	0
Lazio	2021–22	Serie A	31	0	—		2	0	7	0	—		40	0
Lazio	Total		106	3	—		9	0	28	0	1	0	144	3
Real Betis	2022–23	La Liga	23	0	—		1	0	5	0	1 (Note: Appearance in Supercopa de España)	0	30	0
Real Betis	2023–24	La Liga	4	0	—		—		—		—		4	0
Real Betis	Total		27	0	—		1	0	5	0	1	0	34	0
Al-Ittihad	2023–24	Saudi Pro League	18	0	—		2	0	5 (Note: Appearances in AFC Champions League)	0	2 (Note: Appearances in Saudi Super Cup)	0	27	0
Al-Ittihad	2024–25	Saudi Pro League	1	0	—		0	0	—		—		1	0
Al-Ittihad	Total		19	0	—		2	0	5	0	2	0	28	0
Marseille	2024–25	Ligue 1	4	0	—		—		—		—		4	0
Rayo Vallecano	2025–26	La Liga	10	0	—		1	0	6 (Note: Appearances in UEFA Conference League)	0	—		17	0
Career total			182	3	8	0	13	0	44	0	8	0	255	3

=== International ===
As of match played 14 June 2022

Appearances and goals by national team and year
National team	Year	Apps	Goals
Italy	2022	1	0
Total		1	0

== Honours ==
Lazio

- Coppa Italia: 2018–19
- Supercoppa Italiana: 2017, 2019
