= Gustavo Cipriano =

Brazilian footballer (born 2001)

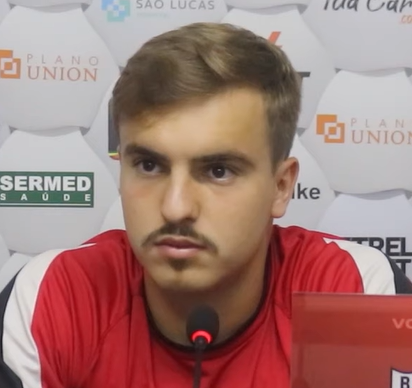
- Cipriano in 2022

Personal information
- Full name: Gustavo Cipriano de Azevedo
- Date of birth: 26 February 2001 (age 25)
- Place of birth: Santos, Brazil
- Height: 1.85 m (6 ft 1 in)
- Position: Centre back

Team information
- Current team: Internacional de Lages

Youth career
- 2006–2021: Santos
- 2019–2020: → Lazio (loan)

Senior career*
Years	Team	Apps	(Gls)
2021–2022	Ponte Preta	2	(0)
2023	Botafogo-SP	1	(0)
2023–	Internacional de Lages		
- * Club domestic league appearances and goals as of 3 July 2023

Gustavo Cipriano de Azevedo (born 26 February 2001) is a Brazilian footballer who plays as a central defender for Internacional de Lages.

== Club career ==
Born in Santos, São Paulo, Cipriano joined Santos' youth setup at the age of five. On 9 May 2018, he signed his first professional contract, agreeing to a three-year deal until April 2021.

On 26 July 2019, Cipriano moved to Serie A side Lazio on loan for one year, with a buyout clause; he was initially assigned to the Primavera squad. He returned in July of the following year, and left Peixe on 30 April 2021, as his contract expired.

On 30 June 2021, Cipriano signed a contract with Série B side Ponte Preta until May 2022. He made his professional debut on 20 November, coming on as a late substitute for Yago in a 1–0 away win over Confiança.

Cipriano played a further match for Ponte before spending the entire 2022 campaign with the under-23 team. On 8 December of that year, he was announced at Botafogo-SP for the upcoming season.

== Career statistics ==
As of 29 March 2023

Club	Season	League			State League		Cup		Continental		Other		Total	
Club	Season	Division	Apps	Goals	Apps	Goals	Apps	Goals	Apps	Goals	Apps	Goals	Apps	Goals
Ponte Preta	2021	Série B	2	0	—		—		—		—		2	0
Ponte Preta	2022	Série B	0	0	0	0	0	0	—		—		0	0
Ponte Preta	Total		2	0	0	0	0	0	—		—		2	0
Botafogo-SP	2023	Série B	0	0	1	0	0	0	—		—		1	0
Career total			2	0	1	0	0	0	0	0	0	0	3	0
